= 1972 Democratic Party presidential primaries =

Selection of the Democratic Party nominee

- January 24 to June 20, 1972

3,014 delegates to the Democratic National Convention 1,508 (majority) votes needed to win

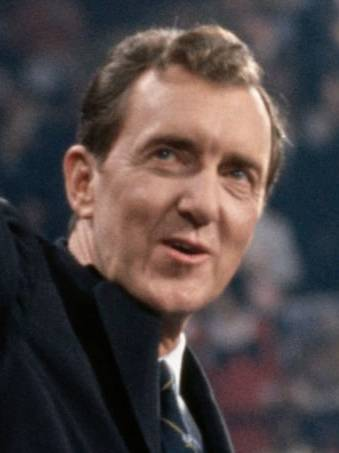

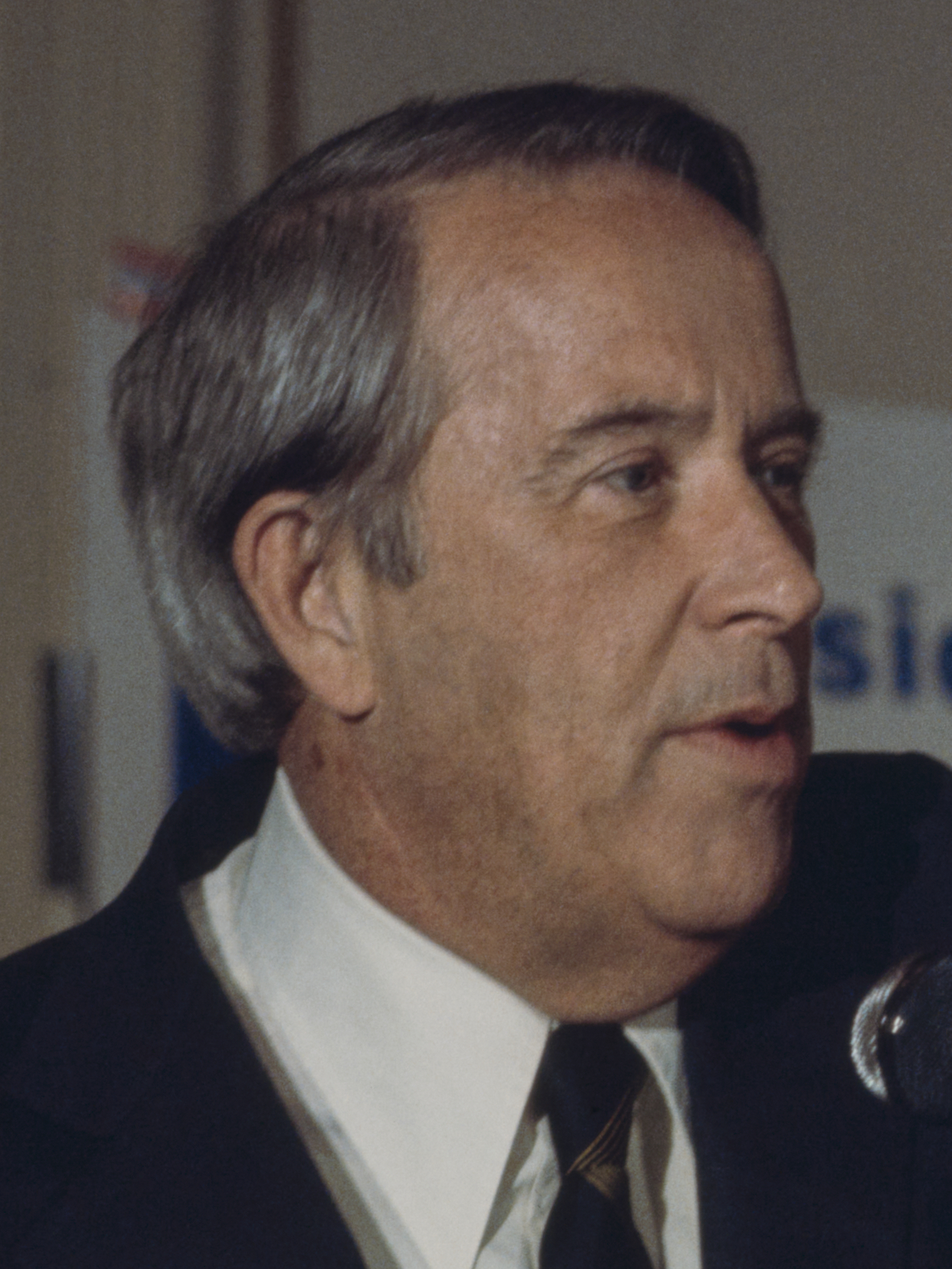

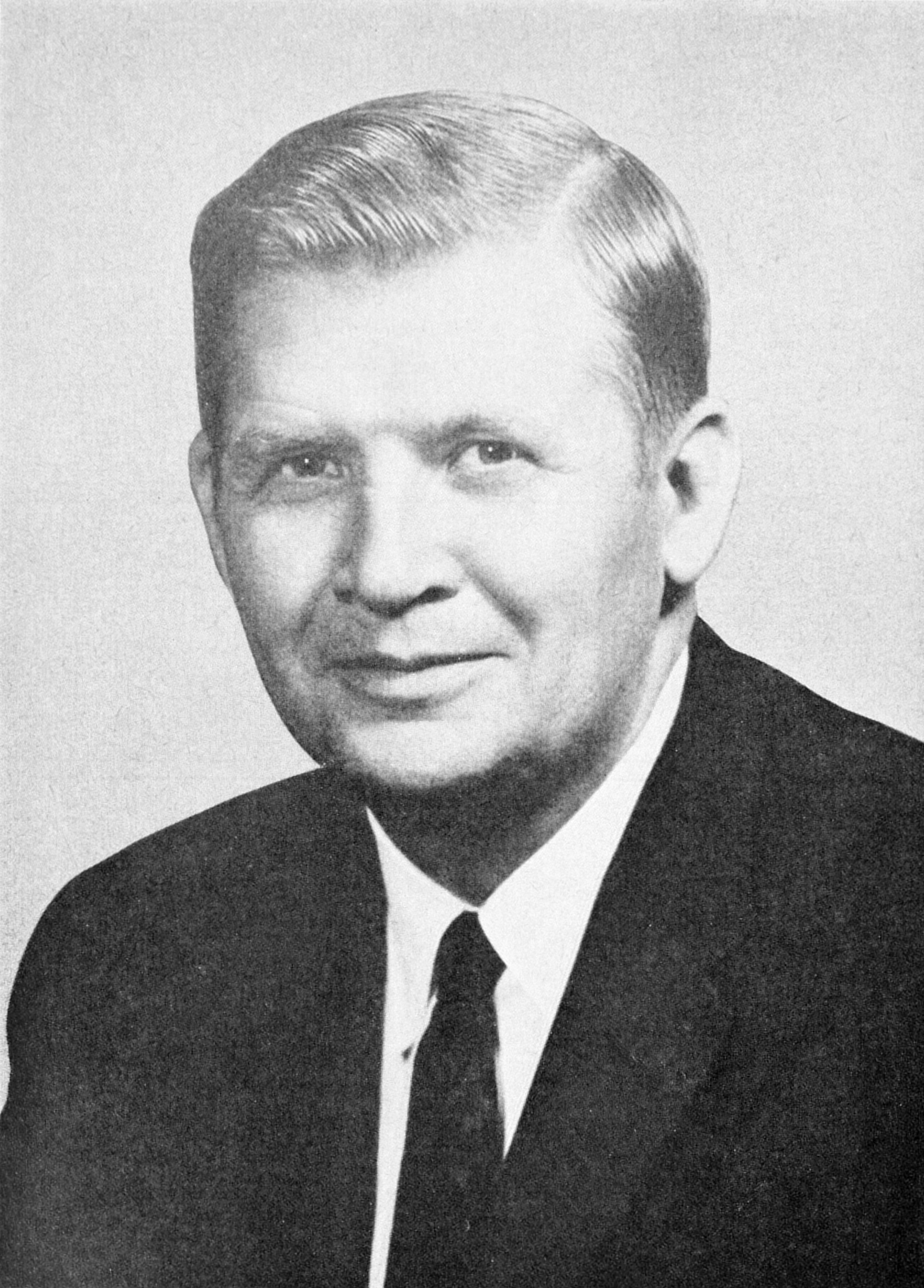

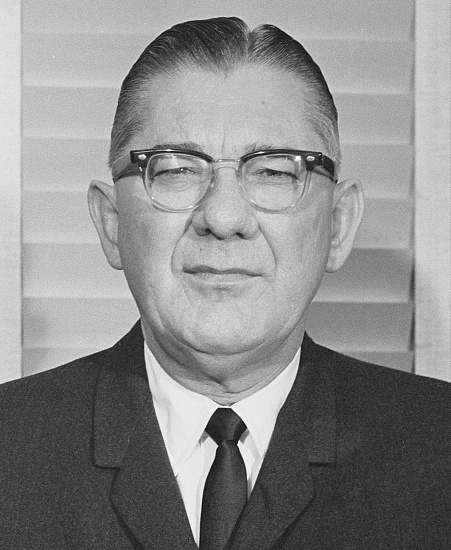

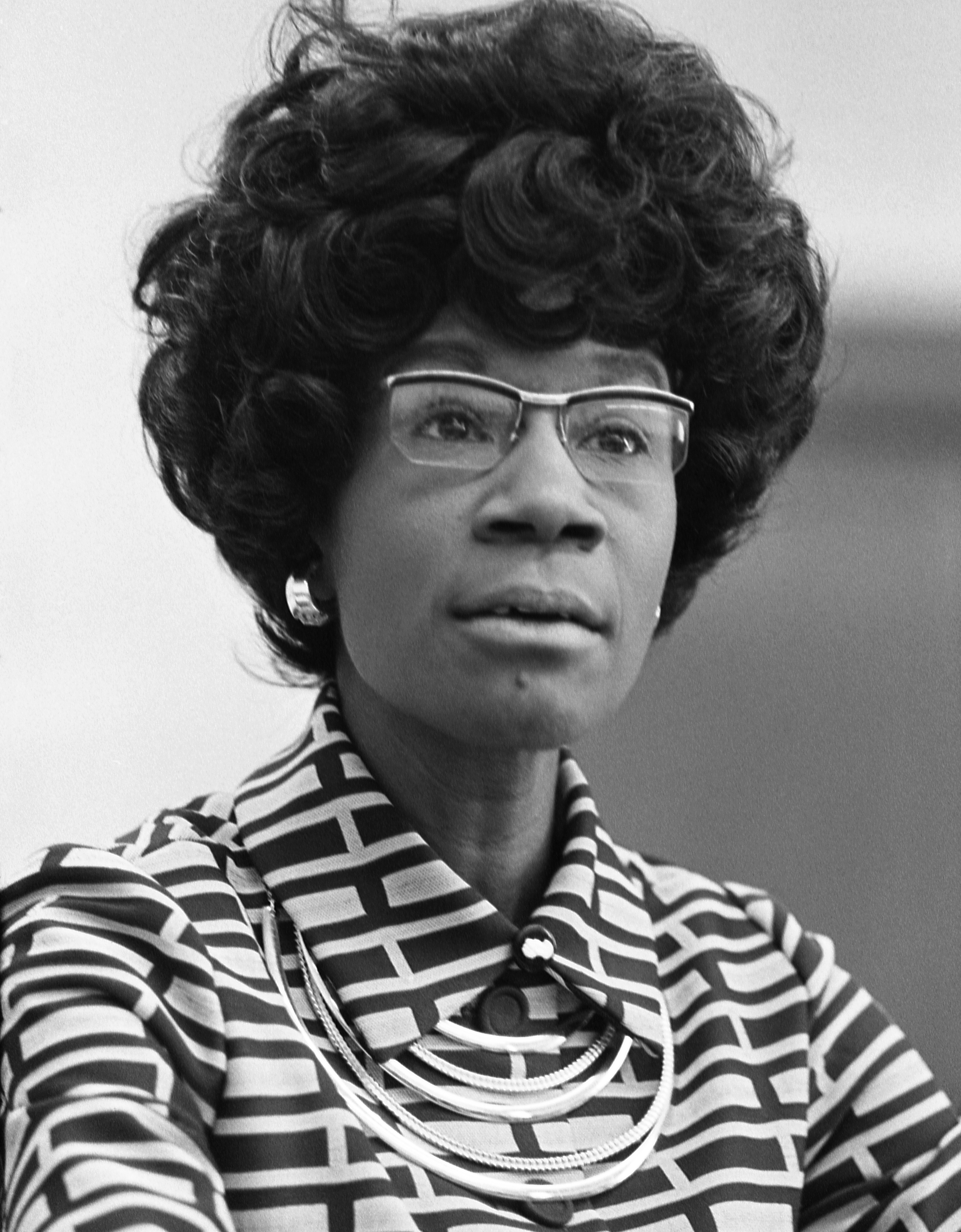
Candidate	George McGovern	George Wallace	Hubert Humphrey
Home state	South Dakota	Alabama	Minnesota
Delegate count	1,319.55	371	345.85
Contests won	16	7	5
Popular vote	4,053,451	3,755,424	4,121,372
Percentage	25.00%	23.17%	25.42%
Candidate	Edmund Muskie	Henry M. Jackson	Terry Sanford
Home state	Maine	Washington	North Carolina
Delegate count	172.5	52	28
Contests won	5	1	0
Popular vote	1,840,217	505,198	331,415
Percentage	11.34%	3.11%	2.04%
Candidate	Wilbur Mills	Shirley Chisholm
Home state	Arkansas	New York
Delegate count	28	22
Contests won	1	1
Popular vote	37,401	430,703
Percentage	0.23%	2.66%
- McGovern Humphrey Wallace Muskie; Jackson Mills Chisholm Uncommitted
Previous Democratic nominee
Hubert Humphrey
Democratic nominee
George McGovern

From January 24 to June 20, 1972, voters of the Democratic Party chose its nominee for president in the 1972 United States presidential election. Senator George McGovern of South Dakota was selected as the nominee through a series of primary elections, caucuses, and state party conventions, culminating in the 1972 Democratic National Convention held from July 10 to July 13, 1972, in Miami, Florida.

== Background ==
=== 1968 election ===
The 1968 election was one of the most eventful and influential in the history of the Democratic Party. The primaries were contested by President Lyndon B. Johnson, Senator Eugene McCarthy, and Senator Robert F. Kennedy. In a shock, McCarthy forced the incumbent president out of the race early by his strong showing in the New Hampshire primary. Kennedy joined the race soon thereafter, and the two ran on their opposition to Johnson's handling of the Vietnam War. They traded primary victories until Kennedy was assassinated in June.

Although Kennedy and McCarthy contested the popular elections, most of the delegates in 1968 were not popularly elected. Thus, with Kennedy dead and McCarthy lacking support from the party establishment, Johnson's vice president Hubert H. Humphrey was easily nominated on the first ballot at the 1968 Democratic National Convention. Humphrey's nomination, the continuing Vietnam War, and the generally closed nature of the nomination process drew massive protests to Chicago; the convention was generally seen as a major embarrassment for the party, and Humphrey was narrowly defeated in the general election by Richard Nixon.

=== McGovern-Fraser Commission ===
In response to the 1968 debacle, party leadership established a twenty-eight member committee selected by Senator Fred R. Harris to reform the presidential nomination process for 1972. The committee was led by Senator George McGovern and Representative Donald M. Fraser. After less than nine months, the committee delivered its guidelines.

The committee focused on two main principles: uniformity and equity. Guidelines required states adopt uniform, explicit delegate selection rules and weight the delegate allocation in favor of politically marginalized groups (women, blacks and those under the age of 30), including the use of quotas.

In general, the state parties complied with the McGovern-Fraser guidelines by adopting the use of primary elections, rather than delegate selection caucuses or conventions. Thus, the 1972 Democratic nomination is typically considered the first modern presidential primary campaign. Harris and McGovern, having played a direct role in the reforms and having a detailed knowledge of their impact, were seen to gain an advantage as potential candidates for the nomination.

=== Nixon administration and 1970 midterm elections ===
As 1972 approached, President Richard Nixon faced uncertain re-election prospects. Nixon had been elected on a platform to end American involvement in Vietnam, but his strategy of gradual "Vietnamization" had proceeded more slowly than planned. The Paris Peace Talks had bogged down, dimming hopes for a negotiated settlement to the war. In fact, Nixon had widened the conflict by invading Cambodia in 1970, a move that ignited criticism in the press and Congress and widespread disorder on college campuses, including the Kent State shootings in May 1970.

On the domestic front, a sharp recession had shaken investor confidence, and Nixon's plan to control inflation with wage and price controls had failed to meet its objective. The administration's attempt to steer a middle course on desegregation busing and affirmative action had displeased liberals and conservatives alike.

In the 1970 midterm elections, Democrats gained a dozen seats in the House, although their Senate majority was reduced by three seats. Their main success was not in Congress, however, but the states. Eleven different Democratic governors were elected to seats held by Republicans and not a single incumbent Democrat lost re-election.

=== Pre-primary maneuvering ===
Given Nixon's apparent weakness and the novel use of the primary system, a large field of credible Democratic challengers emerged. 14 Democrats sought their party's nomination (Note: This number does not include Walter Fauntroy, Wayne Hays, and Carl Stokes, who were considered to be favorite sons.) the largest field of candidates until it was surpassed by 16 candidates in the 2016 Republican presidential primaries and then 29 candidates in the 2020 Democratic presidential primaries.

Early speculation surrounded Senator Ted Kennedy, the brother of the late Senator Robert F. Kennedy who had contested the 1968 nomination. He ruled himself out early in 1971, but nevertheless continued to lead in opinion polling. In the event of a brokered convention, some believed Kennedy could emerge as the consensus nominee. Kennedy supporters took key positions on a number of presidential campaigns, strengthening his odds of gaining the candidates' support in the event they could not secure the required delegates.

With Kennedy out, the establishment favorite for the Democratic nomination was Edmund Muskie, a moderate senator who had acquitted himself well as Humphrey's running mate in 1968. In August 1971 polling amid a growing economic crisis, Muskie led Nixon.

U.S. Representative Shirley Chisholm from Queens, New York, announced her candidacy in January 1972, making her the first black candidate to contest a major party's nomination for president. (Note: Channing Phillips had previously been placed in nomination at the 1968 convention and won the Washington D.C. delegation but was not a contender for national support.) Chisholm was also the first woman to run for the Democratic presidential nomination; she was later joined by Patsy Mink of Hawaii. (Note: Senator Margaret Chase Smith had previously contested the Republican nomination in 1964.)

== Candidates ==
The following politicians stood as candidates for the 1972 Democratic presidential nomination:

=== Nominee ===
Candidate	Most recent office	Home state	Campaign Withdrawal date	Popular vote	Contests won	Running mate	Ref.
George McGovern	U.S. Senator from South Dakota (1963–1981)	South Dakota	(Campaign); Secured nomination: July 13, 1972	4,053,451 (25.3%)	14	Sargent Shriver (Note: Replacing Thomas Eagleton)	

=== Other major candidates ===
These candidates participated in multiple state primaries or were included in multiple major national polls.

Candidate		Most recent office	Home state	Campaign Withdrawal date	Ref.
Hubert Humphrey		U.S. Senator from Minnesota (1949–1964; 1971–1978); Vice President of the United States (1965–1969)	Minnesota	(Campaign); Declared: January 10, 1972	
George Wallace		Governor of Alabama (1963–1967; 1971–1979; 1983–1987)	Alabama	(Campaign); Declared: January 13, 1972	
Edmund Muskie		U.S. Senator from Maine (1959–1980)	Maine	(Campaign); Declared: January 4, 1972; Suspended campaign: April 27, 1972	
Henry M. Jackson	Scoop_Jackson_campaigning_in_1976_(cropped)	U.S. Senator from Washington (1953–1983)	Washington	(Campaign); Declared: November 19, 1971; Suspended campaign: May 2, 1972	
Wilbur Mills		U.S. Representative from Arkansas (1939–1977)	Arkansas	(Campaign); Declared: February 11, 1972	
Shirley Chisholm		U.S. Representative from New York (1969–1983)	New York	(Campaign); Declared: January 25, 1972	
Terry Sanford		Governor of North Carolina (1961–1965)	North Carolina	(Campaign); Declared: March 8, 1972	
John Lindsay		Mayor of New York City (1966–1973)	New York	(Campaign); Declared: December 28, 1971; Withdrew: April 4, 1972	
Eugene McCarthy		U.S. Senator from Minnesota (1959–1971)	Minnesota	(Campaign); Declared: December 17, 1971	
Sam Yorty		Mayor of Los Angeles (1961–1973)	California	(Campaign); Declared: November 16, 1971; Withdrew: June 5, 1972 (endorsed Humphrey)	
Vance Hartke		U.S. Senator from Indiana (1964–1973)	Indiana	(Campaign); Declared: January 3, 1972; Withdrew: March 26, 1972 (endorsed Humphrey)	
Patsy Mink		U.S. Representative from Hawaii (1965–1977)	Hawaii	(Campaign); Declared: October 19, 1971; Withdrew: May 24, 1972	
Fred Harris		U.S. Senator from Oklahoma (1964–1973)	Oklahoma	(Campaign); Declared: September 24, 1971; Withdrew: November 10, 1971 (endorsed McGovern on April 27)	

=== Declined ===
- Birch Bayh, U.S. senator from Indiana (declined October 12, 1971)
- Harold Hughes, U.S. senator from Iowa (declined July 15, 1971)
- William Proxmire, U.S. senator from Wisconsin (declined November 6, 1971; endorsed McGovern on March 31)

=== Favorite sons ===
- Walter Fauntroy, delegate to the U.S. House of Representatives from the District of Columbia
- Wayne Hays, U.S. representative from Ohio
- Carl Stokes, mayor of Cleveland

== Polling ==
=== National polling ===
View source data.

Poll source	Publication	Birch Bayh	Shirley Chisholm	J. William Fulbright	Fred Harris	Harold Hughes	Hubert Humphrey	John Lindsay	Scoop Jackson	Ted Kennedy	Mike Mansfield	Eugene McCarthy	George McGovern	Wilbur Mills	Edmund Muskie	William Proxmire	George Wallace	Sam Yorty
Gallup	Jan. 1969	—	—	—	—	—	21%	—	—	45%	—	15%	3%	—	17%	—	—	—
Gallup	Oct. 1969	—	—	—	—	—	29%	—	—	27%	—	10%	5%	—	24%	—	—	—
Gallup	May. 1970	—	—	—	1%	1%	16%	10%	—	17%	—	9%	3%	—	23%	—	—	—
Gallup	Nov. 1970	—	—	—	—	—	16%	4%	—	31%	1%	6%	2%	—	33%	2%	—	—
Gallup	Feb. 1971	—	—	—	—	—	21%	5%	—	25%	—	4%	5%	—	26%	—	—	—
Gallup	Apr. 1971	1%	—	1%	—	1%	18%	4%	2%	29%	2%	3%	5%	1%	21%	2%	—	—
Gallup	Apr. 1971	1%	—	1%	—	1%	18%	4%	2%	29%	2%	3%	5%	1%	21%	2%	—	—
Gallup	Jul. 1971	2%	—	1%	—	1%	18%	3%	2%	22%	1%	6%	5%	1%	22%	1%	—	—
Gallup	Aug. 1971	—	—	—	—	—	13%	6%	—	26%	—	4%	6%	—	22%	—	—	—
Harris	Sep. 1971	—	—	—	1%	—	16%	7%	2%	26%	—	5%	4%	2%	19%	1%	—	—
Harris	Sep. 1971	—	—	—	1%	—	27%	11%	2%	—	—	7%	5%	2%	27%	2%	—	—
Gallup	Nov. 1971	—	—	—	—	—	19%	4%	6%	29%	—	5%	6%	—	24%	—	—	—
Harris	Nov. 1971	—	—	—	—	—	15%	9%	2%	25%	—	3%	5%	1%	22%	1%	—	1%
Harris	Nov. 1971	—	—	—	—	—	25%	12%	2%	—	—	4%	6%	2%	27%	2%	—	1%
Gallup	Dec. 1971	—	—	—	—	—	19%	4%	4%	32%	—	4%	5%	—	25%	—	—	1%
Gallup	Dec. 1971	—	—	—	—	—	34%	8%	5%	—	—	5%	8%	—	31%	—	—	1%
Gallup	Jan. 1972	—	2%	—	—	—	17%	5%	2%	27%	—	5%	3%	—	32%	—	—	2%
Gallup	Jan. 1972	—	2%	—	—	—	29%	7%	3%	—	—	8%	3%	—	39%	—	—	2%
Harris	Jan. 1972	—	3%	—	—	—	23%	7%	5%	—	—	6%	5%	—	30%	—	—	1%
Gallup	Feb. 1972	—	2%	—	—	—	23%	2%	3%	24%	—	3%	5%	—	29%	—	—	1%
Gallup	Feb. 1972	—	3%	—	—	—	32%	5%	4%	—	—	4%	6%	—	35%	—	—	1%
Harris	Feb. 1972	—	5%	—	—	—	18%	6%	4%	15%	—	5%	5%	—	22%	—	11%	1%
Harris	Feb. 1972	—	6%	—	—	—	21%	7%	3%	—	—	5%	8%	—	28%	—	12%	1%
Gallup	Mar. 1972	—	2%	—	—	—	31%	7%	3%	—	—	5%	6%	2%	23%	—	15%	*
Gallup	Mar. 1972	—	3%	—	—	—	35%	8%	5%	—	—	6%	7%	2%	28%	—	—	1%
Gallup	Mar. 1972	—	4%	—	—	—	31%	5%	5%	—	—	4%	5%	1%	22%	—	17%	*
Gallup	Apr. 1972	—	5%	—	—	—	30%	—	4%	—	—	3%	17%	1%	17%	—	19%	1%
Gallup	May 1972	—	3%	—	—	—	35%	—	3%	—	—	3%	20%	2%	11%	—	18%	—
Gallup	May 1972	—	—	—	—	—	26%	—	—	—	—	—	25%	—	—	—	26%	—
Gallup	Jun. 1972	—	3%	—	—	—	27%	—	3%	—	—	2%	30%	1%	6%	—	25%	—

== Primary campaign ==
Hubert Humphrey made another run at the nomination, in an era when previous nominees were considered legitimate contenders even after losing a general election (Adlai Stevenson had been successful at being re-nominated by Democrats in 1956, and Nixon by the GOP in 1968). He fell just short in delegates, despite winning the popular vote in the 24 states and the District of Columbia which held preference primary and caucus elections open to the rank and file Democratic voter. His bid to contest the results of the California winner-take-all primary failed. Humphrey, like Senator Henry "Scoop" Jackson, was considered the favorite of the party establishment after Muskie's withdrawal.

Alabama governor George Wallace, with his "outsider" image, did well in the South (he won every county in the Florida primary with the exception of Miami-Dade) and among alienated and dissatisfied voters. What might have become a forceful campaign was cut short when Wallace was shot while campaigning, and left paralyzed in an assassination attempt by Arthur Bremer.

Chairman of the House Ways and Means Committee Wilbur Mills was drafted by friends and fellow Congressmen to make himself available as a candidate for the primaries. To position himself to appeal to senior citizens during the 1972 presidential campaign, Mills championed the automatic Cost Of Living Adjustment (COLA) to Social Security. He was not strong in the primaries, and won 33 votes for president from the delegates at the 1972 Democratic National Convention, which nominated Senator George McGovern.

Washington Senator Scoop Jackson was little known nationally when he first ran for president in 1972. McGovern accused Jackson of racism for his opposition to busing. Jackson's high point in the campaign was a distant third in the early Florida primary, but he failed to stand out of the pack of better-known rivals, and only made real news later in the campaign as part of the "Anybody but McGovern" coalition, that raised what would be known as the "Acid, Amnesty and Abortion" questions about McGovern. Jackson suspended active campaigning in May after a weak showing in the Ohio primary. Jackson did re-emerge at the August Democratic convention after runner-up Humphrey dropped out of the race. Jackson's name was placed in nomination by Georgia Governor Jimmy Carter, and he finished second in the delegate roll call, well behind nominee McGovern.

=== March 7: New Hampshire ===
Prior to the New Hampshire primary, the "Canuck Letter" was published in the Manchester Union-Leader. The letter (later revealed to have been forged as part of the "dirty tricks" campaign by Nixon staffers) claimed that Muskie had made disparaging remarks about French-Canadians. The paper subsequently published an attack on Muskie's wife Jane, reporting that she drank and used off-color language. Muskie made an emotional defense of his wife in a speech outside the newspaper's offices during a snowstorm. Though Muskie later stated that what had appeared to be tears were actually melted snowflakes, the press reported that Muskie broke down and cried. Muskie did worse than expected in the primary, while McGovern came in a surprisingly close second. McGovern now had the momentum, which was well orchestrated by his campaign manager, Gary Hart.

=== May 15–16: Attempted Wallace assassination, Maryland, and Michigan ===
While campaigning in Laurel, Maryland, on May 15, 1972, Wallace was shot five times by Arthur Bremer. Three others wounded in the shooting also survived. Bremer's diary, published after his arrest as a book titled An Assassin's Diary, showed that Bremer's assassination attempt was not motivated by politics, but by a desire for fame, and that President Nixon had been a possible target. The assassination attempt left Wallace paralyzed for the rest of his life, as one of the bullets had lodged in his spinal column.

As a result of the shooting, President Nixon dispatched Secret Service protection to Representatives Shirley Chisholm and Wilbur Mills (two candidates who had not been assigned Secret Service details up to then) as well as Senator Ted Kennedy (though not running, because of his brothers John and Robert having been assassinated).

Following the shooting, Wallace won the May 16 primaries in Maryland and Michigan. Wallace spoke at the Democratic National Convention from his wheelchair in Miami on July 11, 1972. Bremer was sentenced to 53 years in prison for the shooting. He served 35 years of the sentence and was released on parole on November 9, 2007.

In a widely noted 1992 article, journalist Seymour Hersh claimed that secret recordings of Nixon prove that, within hours of the assassination attempt, the president and a top aide dispatched a political operative, E. Howard Hunt, who rushed to Milwaukee with plans to surreptitiously enter Bremer's apartment and plant the campaign literature of Democratic contender George McGovern. According to Hersh, Hunt aborted the operation because the FBI had sealed off Bremer's apartment prior to his arrival. However, a 2007 analysis of the Nixon tapes by the History News Network did not turn up any evidence of the clandestine operation described by Hersh. While the tapes did show that Nixon had instructed presidential aide Charles W. Colson to anonymously spread the false rumor that there was "unmistakable evidence" that Bremer had been "a supporter of McGovern and Kennedy", there was no apparent trace of Nixon tasking subordinates with entering Bremer's apartment to plant Democratic campaign materials.

== Endorsements ==
George McGovern

McGovern received endorsements from:

Executive branch officials

Department of State officials

- John Galbraith, U.S. ambassador to India (1961–1963)

U.S. senators

Current

- Fred R. Harris, U.S. senator for Oklahoma (1964–1973)
- William Proxmire, U.S. senator for Wisconsin (1957–1989)
- Abraham Ribicoff, U.S. senator for Connecticut (1963–1981)

Former

- Ernest Gruening, U.S. senator for Alaska (1959–1969)

U.S. representatives

Current

- James Abourezk, U.S. representative for SD-02 (1971–1973)
- John Conyers, (Note: Endorsed McGovern in the Ohio presidential primary) U.S. representative for MI-01 (1965–1993)
- Ron Dellums, U.S. representative for CA-07 (1971–1975)
- Frank Denholm, U.S. representative for SD-01 (1971–1975)
- Robert Drinan, U.S. representative for MA-03 (1971–1973)
- Pete McCloskey, U.S. representative for CA-11 (Republican) (1967–1973)

Former

- Richard Ottinger, U.S. representative for NY-25 (1965–1971)

Governors

Current

- Richard Kneip, governor of South Dakota (1971–1978)

State executive officials

Current

Lieutenant governors

- William Dougherty, lieutenant governor of South Dakota (1971–1975)

Treasurers

- Charles Smith, state treasurer of Wisconsin

State representatives

Current

California

- Willie Brown, 18th District (1965–1974)
- Kenneth Cory, 69th District (1967–1974)
- Robert Crown, 14th District (1957–1973)
- John Dunlap, 5th District (1967–1974)
- Kenneth A. Meade, 16th District (1971–1974)
- John Vasconcellos, 24th District (1967–1974)

Florida

- Sandy D'Alemberte, 98th District (1967–1972)

Georgia

- Julian Bond, 111th District (1965–1973)

New York

- Oliver Koppell, 84th District (1970–1982)

Local and county officials

Current

Executive officials

- Robert Abrams, Bronx borough president

Legislative officials

- Eldon Clingan, New York City councilman, at-large district (1970–1973)
- Matthew Troy, New York City councilman, 5th District (1964–1977)

Party officials

Current

State party officials

- James Guffey, chair of the South Dakota Democratic Party
- Cliff Larson, chair of the Iowa Democratic Party

Former

State party officials

- Alfred Catalfo, chair of the New Hampshire Democratic Party

Business leaders

- Robert Bernstein, president of Random House
- Max Palevsky, venture capitalist
- Eli Sagan, president of New York Girl Coat Co.
- Robert Townsend, former president of Avis

Political operatives

- Patrick Caddell
- Gary Hart
- Frank Mankiewicz

Actors

- Jack Albertson, actor, comedian and singer
- Alan Arkin, actor and director
- Polly Bergen, actress
- Red Buttons, actor and comedian
- Mike Connors, actor
- Tony Curtis, actor
- Britt Ekland, actress
- Jane Fonda, actress
- Anthony Franciosa, actor
- Ben Gazzara, actor and director
- Elliott Gould, actor
- Tammy Grimes, actress
- Gene Hackman, actor
- Julie Harris, actress
- Goldie Hawn, actress
- Dustin Hoffman, actor
- Marsha Hunt, actress
- James Earl Jones, actor
- Elia Kazan, director
- Sally Kellerman, actress
- Gene Kelly, actor and singer
- Eartha Kitt, actress
- Jack Klugman, actor
- Burt Lancaster, actor
- Jack Lemmon, actor
- Shirley MacLaine, actress
- Karl Malden, actor
- Fredric March, actor
- Walter Matthau, actor, director and comedian
- Elaine May, actress, comedian and playwright
- Vera Miles, actress
- Rita Moreno, actress and singer
- Robert Morse, actor
- Paul Newman, actor and director
- Mike Nichols, actor and director
- Jack Nicholson, actor
- Leonard Nimoy, actor
- Ryan O'Neal, actor
- Tom Poston, actor
- Hal Prince, director
- Tony Randall, actor
- Janice Rule, actress and psychotherapist
- Barbara Rush, actress
- Robert Ryan, actor
- Eva Marie Saint, actress
- Tom Smothers, actor, comedian, musician
- Rod Steiger, actor
- Marlo Thomas, actress
- Lily Tomlin, actress, comedian and singer
- Robert Vaughn, actor
- Jon Voight, actor
- Eli Wallach, actor
- Dennis Weaver, actor
- Raquel Welch, actress
- Gene Wilder, actor, comedian and filmmaker
- Joanne Woodward, actress

Musicians

- Ed Ames, singer and actor
- Sonny Bono, singer
- Dave Brubeck, jazz pianist and composer
- Cher, singer and actress
- Judy Collins, singer
- Peter Duchin, pianist
- Cass Elliot, singer
- Quincy Jones, composer and conductor
- Carole King, singer
- Tom Lehrer, singer and satirist
- Alan Lerner, lyricist and librettist
- Henry Mancini, composer and conductor
- Herbie Mann, jazz flutist
- Joni Mitchell, singer and multi-instrumentalist
- Michelle Phillips, singer
- Artie Shaw, clarinetist, composer, actor and director
- Carly Simon, singer, memoirist, author
- Paul Simon, singer
- Barbra Streisand, singer
- James Taylor, singer and guitarist
- Mary Travers, singer
- Ruth Warrick, singer and actress
- Andy Williams, singer

Academics

- Thomas Adams, president of the Massachusetts Historical Society
- Stephen Birmingham, author
- Mary Bunting, bacterial geneticist
- Owen Chamberlain, physicist
- Salvador Luria, microbiologist
- Arthur M. Schlesinger Jr., historian
- Neil Simon, playwright and author
- Albert Szent-Györgyi, biochemist
- Richard Clement Wade, historian
- George Wald, scientist

Sports figures

- Arthur Ashe, tennis player
- Shelley Mann, swimmer and Olympic medalist
- Paul Warfield, NFL wide receiver

Religious figures

- Ralph Abernathy, Baptist minister

Activists and public figures

- Helen Emmerich, freelance writer
- Jerome Grossman
- Abbie Hoffman
- Jesse Jackson, president of PUSH (1971–1984)
- Kathleen Kennedy
- Coretta Scott King
- George Plimpton, writer and journalist
- Victor G. Reuther, labor organizer
- Jerry Rubin
- Richard Stearns

Newspapers

- The Miami News
- The Palm Beach Post

George Wallace

Wallace received endorsements from:

U.S. senators

Current

- James Allen, U.S. senator from Alabama

Governors

Former

- Ross Barnett, governor of Mississippi

State executive officials

Current

Lieutenant governors

- Lester Maddox, lieutenant governor of Georgia

Secretaries of state

- Mabel Amos, secretary of state of Alabama

Treasurers

- Agnes Baggett, state treasurer of Alabama

Auditors

- Melba Till Allen, state auditor of Alabama

Agriculture commissioners

- Richard Beard, agriculture commissioner of Alabama

Public service commissioners

- Juanita McDaniel, member of the Alabama Public Service Commission
- Jack Owen, member of the Alabama Public Service Commission

State senators

Current

Florida

- William Barrow, 3rd District (1966–1972)

Georgia

- Hugh Carter, 14th District (1967–1981)

Local and county officials

Current

Mayors

- John McKinney, mayor of Talladega, Alabama
- Ronnie Thompson, mayor of Macon, Georgia (Republican) (1967–1975)

Business leaders

- Bill France Sr., founder and CEO of NASCAR

Actors

- Chill Wills, actor and singer

Musicians

- Billy Grammer, singer and guitarist
- George Jones, singer
- Grandpa Jones, banjo player and singer
- Ferlin Husky, singer
- Stonewall Jackson, singer
- Hank Snow, guitarist and singer
- Tammy Wynette, singer

Activists and public figures

- Robert Shelton, Imperial Wizard of the United Klans of America
- Tom Turnipseed, attorney

Organizations

State political parties

- American Party of South Carolina
- Independent Party of South Carolina

Hubert Humphrey

Humphrey received endorsements from:

Executive branch officials

Cabinet level officials

- Orville Freeman, U.S. secretary of agriculture (1961–1969)

Department of State officials

- John Gronouski, U.S. ambassador to Poland (1965–1968)

U.S. senators

Current

- Walter Mondale, U.S. senator from Minnesota

Governors

Former

- Haydon Burns, governor of Florida (1965–1967)
- Charley Johns, governor of Florida (1953–1955)

State senators

Former

Florida

- Edwin Fraser (1961–1963)

State representatives

Current

Ohio

- C. J. McLin, 36th District (1967–1988)

State representatives

Former

Florida

- Maurice Ferré, 91st District (1967–1968)

Local and county officials

Current

Mayors

- Joseph Alioto, mayor of San Francisco, California (1968–1976)
- Ted Berry, mayor of Cincinnati, Ohio (1972–1976)
- Alfonso Cervantes, mayor of St. Louis, Missouri (1965–1973)
- Chuck Hall, mayor of Miami Beach, Florida (1971–1974)
- David T. Kennedy, mayor of Miami, Florida (1970–1973)
- James McGee, mayor of Dayton, Ohio (1970–1982)

Former

Mayors

- Maynard Abrams, mayor of Hollywood, Florida

Business leaders

- Dwayne Andreas, CEO of ADM
- Joseph Cole, president of Cole National Corp.
- Joseph Danzansky, head of Giant Foods Inc.
- Harrison Dogole, chairman of Globe Security Systems
- Harold Greenwood, president of Midwest Federal Savings & Loan
- Carl Pohlad, president of Marquette National Bank

Actors

- Edie Adams, actress, comedian and singer
- Jimmy Durante, actor, comedian and singer
- Eva Gabor, actress
- Lorne Greene, actor and singer
- Phyllis Kirk, actress
- Dick Shawn, actor and comedian

Musicians

- Ray Charles, singer and pianist
- Billy Daniels, singer
- Percy Faith, composer and conductor
- Robert Goulet, singer and actor
- Trini Lopez, singer, guitarist and actor
- The New Christy Minstrels, folk music group

Sports figures

- Alan Page, NFL defensive tackle

Activists and public figures

- I. W. Abel, president of United Steelworkers
- Peter Bommarito, president of United Rubber Workers of America
- Revels Cayton
- ~~Harry Davis~~ (endorsed Chisholm March 23)
- John Jay Hooker, attorney
- Eugene Wyman, attorney

Organizations

Labor unions

- Retail Clerks International Union
- United Rubber Workers of America

Newspapers

- Cocoa Today
- The Daytona Beach News-Journal
- St. Petersburg Independent

Edmund Muskie (to April 27, 1972)

Muskie received endorsements from:

Executive branch officials

Department of State officials

- Raúl Héctor Castro, U.S. ambassador to Bolivia (1968–1969)

U.S. senators

Current

- Quentin Burdick, U.S. senator for North Dakota (1960–1992)
- Frank Church, U.S. senator for Idaho (1957–1981)
- Thomas Eagleton, U.S. senator for Missouri (1968–1987)
- Mike Gravel, U.S. senator
- Philip Hart, U.S. senator for Michigan (1959–1976)
- Harold Hughes, U.S. senator for Iowa (1969–1975)
- Thomas McIntyre, U.S. senator for New Hampshire (1962–1979)
- Lee Metcalf, U.S. senator for Montana (1961–1978)
- Frank Moss, U.S. senator for Utah (1959–1977)
- Adlai Stevenson III, U.S. senator for Illinois (1970–1981)
- Stuart Symington, U.S. senator for Missouri (1953–1976)
- John Tunney, U.S. senator for California (1971–1977)
- Harrison Williams, U.S. senator for New Jersey (1959–1982)

Former

- Albert Gore Sr., U.S. senator for Tennessee (1953–1971)
- Joseph Tydings, U.S. senator for Maryland (1965–1971)

U.S. representatives

Current

- Dante Fascell, U.S. representative for FL-12 (1967–1973)
- Sam Gibbons, U.S. representative for FL-06 (1967–1973)
- Tip O'Neill, U.S. representative for MA-08 (1963–1987)
- Thomas M. Rees, U.S. representative for CA-26 (1971–1975)
- James V. Stanton, U.S. representative for OH-20 (1971–1977)
- Mo Udall, U.S. representative for AZ-02 (1961–1991)
- Lionel Van Deerlin, U.S. representative for CA-37 (1963–1981)
- Charles Vanik, U.S. representative for OH-22 (1955–1981)

Former

- Franklin D. Roosevelt Jr., U.S. representative for NY-20 (1949–1955)

Governors

Current

- Wendell Ford, governor of Kentucky (1971–1974)
- John Gilligan, governor of Ohio (1971–1975)
- Warren Hearnes, governor of Missouri (1965–1973)
- Cal Rampton, governor of Utah (1965–1977)

Former

- Buford Ellington, governor of Tennessee (1967–1971)
- Samuel Goddard Jr., governor of Arizona (1965–1967)

State executive officials

Current

Secretary of state

- Jerry Brown, secretary of state of California (1971–1975)
- John Davoren, secretary of state of Massachusetts (1967–1974)

Attorneys general

- Robert H. Quinn, attorney general of Massachusetts (1969–1975)

Treasurers

- Robert Q. Crane, state treasurer of Massachusetts (1964–1991)
- Tom Wiseman, state treasurer of Tennessee

Auditors

- Thaddeus M. Buczko, state auditor of Massachusetts (1969–1975)

State senators

Current

Arizona

- Sam Lenoard Lena, 12-Pima (1971–1975)

California

- James Mills, 40th District (president pro tempore) (1963–1974)
- George Zenovich, 16th District (1971–1974)

Florida

- Lynwood Arnold, 9th District (1970–1972)
- Louis de la Parte, 26th District (1967–1972)
- Bob Graham, 48th District (1970–1972)
- Bill Gunter, 18th District (1966–1972)
- Ray Knopke, 23rd District (1966–1972)
- Ken Myers, 45th District (1968–1972)
- Dan Scarborough, ? District (?)

Massachusetts

- Kevin Harrington, 2nd Essex District (1959–1978) (Senate president)

Former

Florida

- John E. Mathews, ? District (?)

State representatives

Current

California

- Mike Cullen, 44th District (1967–1974)
- Joe Gonsalves, 44th District (1963–1974)
- John Quimby, 72nd District (1963–1974)

Florida

- George Baumgartner, 107th District (1968–1972)
- Dick Clark, 93rd District (1968–1976)
- Murray Dubbin, 95th District (1963–1974)
- Harold Featherstone, 101st District (1967–1972)
- Jeff Gautier, 109th District (1968–1972)
- Joe Lang Kershaw, 105th District (1968–1982)
- Elvin Martinez, ? District (1966–1998)
- Richard Pettigrew, 97th District (1963–1972)
- Carl Singleton, 103rd District (1968–1972)
- Guy Spicola, 62nd District (1971–1973)
- Edward Trombetta, 89th District (1970–1972)
- Ralph Turlington, ? District (1950–1974)
- Louis Wolfson, ? District (1963–1973)

Massachusetts

- David Bartley, 7th Hampden District (1963–1976) (House speaker)

Former

Florida

- Frederick Schultz, ? District (1963–1970)

Local and county officials

Current

Mayors

- Hans Tanzler, mayor of Jacksonville, Florida (1971–1974)
- Kevin White, mayor of Boston, Massachusetts (1968–1984)

Former

Mayors

- Joseph Casdin, mayor of Worcester, Massachusetts (1967–1968)

Party officials

Former

State party officials

- Rogert Kent, chair of the California Democratic Party

Business leaders

- Sumner Redstone, CEO of National Amusements

Actors

- Jim Backus, actor
- Gene Barry, actor
- Jackie Cooper, actor and director
- Richard Crenna, actor
- Henry Fonda, actor
- Peter Fonda, actor
- Rosey Grier, actor and singer
- Jack Lemmon, actor
- Darren McGavin, actor
- Greg Morris, actor
- Ryan O'Neal, actor
- Edward G. Robinson, actor
- Leslie Uggams, actress and singer
- Shelley Winters, actress
- Natalie Wood, actress

Musicians

- Peter Duchin, pianist
- Dionne Warwick, singer

Sports figures

- Hank Aaron, professional baseball right fielder and designated hitter
- Bobby Murcer, professional baseball outfielder

Activists and public figures

- Alcee Hastings, attorney
- Emily Kimbrough, author and journalist
- Gilbert Merritt Jr., attorney

Scoop Jackson (to May 2, 1972)

Jackson received endorsements from:

U.S. senators

Current

- Sam Ervin, U.S. senator for North Carolina (1954–1974)
- Warren Magnuson, U.S. senator for Washington (1944–1981)

Former

- Spessard Holland, U.S. senator for Florida (1946–1971)

U.S. representatives

Current

- Charles Bennett, U.S. representative for FL-03 (1967–1993)
- Bill Chappell, U.S. representative for FL-04 (1969–1989)
- Tom Foley, U.S. representative for WA-05 (1965–1995)
- Edith Green, U.S. representative for OR-03 (1955–1974)
- James Haley, U.S. representative for FL-07 (1969–1989)
- Floyd Hicks, U.S. representative for WA-06 (1965–1977)
- Mike McCormack, U.S. representative for WA-04 (1971–1981)
- Lloyd Meeds, U.S. representative for WA-02 (1965–1979)
- Bob Sikes, U.S. representative for FL-01 (1945–1979)

Governors

Former

- Farris Bryant, governor of Florida (1961–1965)

State executive officials

Current

Treasurers

- Thomas O'Malley Jr., state treasurer of Florida

Others

- Floyd Christian, commissioner of education of Florida
- Fred Dickinson, state comptroller of Florida

State senators

Former

Florida

- Ben Hill Griffin Jr.
- George Tapper, 25th District (1953–1956)

State representatives

Current

Florida

- George Firestone, ? District (1966–1972)
- Sherman Winn, 105th District (1970–1972)

Tennessee

- Edward Clarence Bank II
- James Roberson

Former

Florida

- Robert Brake, ? District (1966–1967)

Local and county officials

Current

Mayors

- Robert Carl Anderson, mayor of Everett, Washington (Republican)
- Avery Garrett, mayor of Renton, Washington (1969–1976)
- Gordon Johnston, mayor of Tacoma, Washington
- Wesley Uhlman, mayor of Seattle, Washington (1969–1978)

Business leaders

- Monford Orloff, president of Evans Products
- Stephen W. H. Yih, president of Wah Chang Corp.

Political operatives

- Hyman Raskin
- Ben Wattenberg

Academics

- Reid Buckley

Newspapers

- Fort Myers News-Press
- Palm Beach Times

Shirley Chisholm

Chisholm received endorsements from:

U.S. representatives

Current

- John Conyers, (Note: Endorsed Chisholm in the Michigan presidential primary) U.S. representative for MI-01 (1965–1993)
- ~~Ron Dellums, U.S. representative for CA-07~~ (Note: Switched to McGovern on July 9.) (1971–1975)
- Parren Mitchell, U.S. representative for MD-07 (1971–1987)

State representatives

Current

Florida

- Gwen Cherry, 106th District (1970–1979)

Local and county officials

Current

Mayors

- Richard Hatcher, mayor of Gary, Indiana (1968–1988)

Executive officials

- Maynard Jackson, deputy mayor of Atlanta, Georgia (1970–1974)
- Percy Sutton, Manhattan borough president

Actors

- Godfrey Cambridge, actor and comedian
- Diahann Carroll, actress and singer
- Ossie Davis, actor and director
- Ruby Dee, actress and playwright
- Sidney Poitier, actor

Musicians

- Harry Belafonte, singer and actor
- Roberta Flack, singer
- Lena Horne, singer and actress

Academics

- Susan Welch, political scientist

Religious figures

- Ralph Abernathy, head of the SCLC

Activists and public figures

- Harry Davis
- Betty Friedan, president of NOW (1966–1970)
- John Harper II, chairman of the UCP
- LaDonna Harris
- Jesse Jackson, president of PUSH (1971–1984)
- Florynce Kennedy
- Gary Miller, gay rights activist
- Huey P. Newton, leader of the Black Panther Party
- Paul O'Dwyer, attorney
- Jerry Rubin
- Bobby Seale
- Gloria Steinem, chairman of WAA (1971–1978)
- Geraldine Travis

Organizations

Political parties

- Black Panther Party
- Feminist Party

State political parties

- United Citizens Party

Terry Sanford

Sanford received endorsements from:

Executive branch officials

Cabinet-level officials

- Luther Hodges, U.S. secretary of commerce (1961–1965)

U.S. senators

Current

- B. Everett Jordan, U.S. senator for North Carolina (1958–1973)

U.S. representatives

Current

- Nick Galifianakis, U.S. representative for NC-04 (1969–1973)

Former

- Brooks Hays, U.S. representative for AR-05 (1943–1959)

Governors

Current

- Robert Scott, governor of North Carolina (1969–1973)

State executive officials

Current

Attorney generals

- Andrew Miller, attorney general of Virginia (1970–1977)
- Robert Morgan, attorney general of North Carolina (1969–1974)

Activists and public figures

- Anne Cannon Forsyth
- Wilbur Hobby, labor unionist

John Lindsay (to April 4, 1972)

Lindsay received endorsements from:

Executive branch officials

Cabinet level officials

- Elizabeth Gatov, treasurer of the United States (1961–1962)

State senators

Current

Florida

- Edmond Gong, 40th District (1966–1972)

New York

- Antonio Olivieri, 66th District (1971–1974)
- Leonard Simon, 66th District (1967–1973)

Wisconsin

- Dennis Conta, Milwaukee - 3rd District (1968–1976)
- James Wahner, Milwaukee - 15th District (1971–1980)
- Terry Willkom, Chippewa (?)

Former

Florida

- Frederick Karl, 14th District (1968–1971)

Local and county officials

Current

Mayors

- Charles Evers, mayor of Fayette, Mississippi (1969–1981)

Local and county executive officials

- Jerome Kretchmer, New York City EPA administrator
- Norman Levy, head of the New York City Tax Commission
- Eleanor Holmes Norton, chairman of the New York City Human Rights Commission
- Ken Patton, New York City economic development administrator

Local and county officials

Former

Local and county executive officials

- Richard Aurelio, deputy mayor of New York City (?–1971)
- Richard Kellerman, deputy police commissioner of New York City (1969–1970)

Party officials

Former

State party officials

- John J. Burns, chair of the Democratic Party of New York (1965–1971)

Business leaders

- David Garth, president of Garth Associates, Inc.

Political operatives

- Sidney Davidoff, senior advisor (1966–1973)
- Ronnie Eldridge, special mayoral assistant to Lindsay (?–1971)

Actors

- Sherri Finkbine, actress
- Carroll O'Connor, actor

Activists and public figures

- Jeff Greenfield, journalist and writer (1969–1970)
- Dan Paul, attorney
- Leonard Ross, professor at Columbia Law School

Fred Harris (to November 10, 1971)

Harris received endorsements from:

Executive branch officials

Department of State officials

- Jack H. Vaughn, U.S. ambassador to Colombia (1969–1970) (campaign manager)

Business leaders

- Herbert Allen Jr., president of Allen & Company
- Eli Timoner, president of Griffin Industries

Birch Bayh (to October 12, 1971)

Bayh received endorsements from:

State senators

Current

California

- Al Alquist, 13th District (1967–1976)

State representatives

Current

California

- March Fong Eu, 15th District (1967–1974)

== Schedule and results ==
Tablemaker's note: (Note: This should not be taken as a finalized list of results. While a significant amount of research was done, there were a number of delegates who were not bound by the instruction, or "pledged" to a candidate, and to simplify the data these delegates were considered "Uncommitted". Many states also held primaries for the delegate positions, and these on occasion were where slates or candidates pledged to a certain candidate might be elected; however, as these elections allowed for a single person to vote for multiple candidates, as many as the number of positions being filled, it is difficult to determine how many people actually voted in these primaries. For this reason, while such results may be found, they are not included in the popular vote summaries at the bottom of the table.)

Date	Total pledged delegates	Contest and total popular vote	Delegates won and popular vote														
Date	Total pledged delegates	Contest and total popular vote	George McGovern	Hubert Humphrey	George Wallace	Edmund Muskie	Henry Jackson	Wilbur Mills	Shirley Chisholm	Terry Sanford	John Lindsay	Eugene McCarthy	Sam Yorty	Vance Hartke	Patsy Mink	Walter Fauntroy	Other(s) Unpledged
January 25	0 (of 44)	Iowa caucuses (Note: Technically this is only a partial result; over two dozen counties did not hold caucuses when these results were announced, accounting for around (12%) of the expected number of caucusgoers. However, a full tabulation including these counties was not found. Only percentages were found in terms of the number of delegates elected per candidate, not their number nor their total allotment.)	(22.60%)	(1.62%)	-	(35.50%)	(1.06%)	-	(1.33%)	-	-	(1.41%)	-	-	-	-	(35.80%)
January 29	0 (of 25)	Arizona caucuses 500 SDs	102 SDs (20.40%)	2 SDs (0.40%)	-	189 SDs (37.80%)	2 SDs (0.40%)	-	1 SDs (0.20%)	-	118 SDs (23.60%)	-	-	1 SDs (0.20%)	-	-	85 SDs (Note: All were Uncommitted.) (17.00%)
February 12	25 (of 25)	Arizona state convention	5 del.	-	-	9 del.	-	-	-	-	6 del.	-	-	-	-	-	5 del. (Note: Both were Uncommitted.)
February 26	0 (of 44)	Iowa county conventions 3,641 SDs	983 SDs (27.00%)	-	-	1,409 SDs (38.70%)	-	-	-	-	-	-	-	-	-	-	1,249 SDs (Note: 1,176 SDs were Uncommitted at 32.30%, and 73 SDs were for other candidates at 2.00%.) (34.30%)
February 27	25 (of 25)	Mississippi state convention (Note: Two rival delegate slates were named, as the Mississippi Democratic Party was severely divided between White-led Regulars and Black-led Loyalists, with their contests being held at different dates. As the Loyalists were the ones seated at the national convention, it is their slate and nomination date that is presented here.)	-	-	-	-	-	-	-	-	-	-	-	-	-	-	25 del. (Note: All were Uncommitted.)
March 7	20 (of 20)	New Hampshire primary 88,854	6 del. 33,007 (37.15%)	348 WI (0.39%)	175 WI (0.20%)	14 del. 41,235 (46.41%)	197 WI (0.22%)	3,563 WI (4.01%)	-	-	-	-	5,401 (6.08%)	2,417 (2.72%)	-	-	2,511 (Note: Includes 954 write-in votes for Senator Edward Kennedy at 1.07%, 854 write-in votes for President Richard Nixon at 0.96%, 280 votes for Edward T. Coll at 0.32%, 133 write-in votes for Congressman Pete McCloskey at 0.15%, 27 write-in votes for Congressman John Ashbrook at 0.03%, and 19 write-in votes for Comedian Pat Paulsen at 0.02%) (2.83%)
March 11	40 (of 40)	Georgia district conventions	4 Del.	-	-	-	-	1 del.	5 del.	-	-	-	-	-	-	-	30 del. (Note: All were Uncommitted.)
March 14	81 (of 81)	Florida primary 1,264,554	78,232 (6.19%)	6 del. 234,658 (18.56%)	75 del. 526,651 (41.65%)	112,523 (8.90%)	170,156 (13.46%)	4,539 (0.36%)	43,989 (3.48%)	-	82,386 (6.52%)	5,847 (0.46%)	2,564 (0.20%)	3,009 (0.24%)	-	-	-
March 21	0 (of 160)	Illinois pres. primary 1,225,144	3,687 WI (0.30%)	1,476 WI (0.12%)	7,017 WI (0.57%)	766,914 (62.60%)	442 WI (0.04%)	-	777 WI (0.06%)	-	118 WI (0.01%)	444,260 (36.26%)	-	-	-	-	453 (Note: Includes 242 write-in votes for Senator Edward Kennedy at 0.02%.) (0.04%)
March 21	160 (of 160)	Illinois del. primary	14 del.	-	-	59 del.	-	-	-	-	-	-	-	-	-	-	87 del. (Note: All were Uncommitted.)
March 25	34 (of 44)	Iowa district conventions	12 del.	-	-	14 del.	-	-	-	-	-	-	-	-	-	-	8 del. (Note: All were Uncommitted.)
March 29	32 (of 32)	South Carolina state convention	-	-	-	-	-	-	-	-	-	-	-	-	-	-	32 del. (Note: Both were Uncommitted.)
April 4	67 (of 67)	Wisconsin primary 1,128,584	54 del. 333,528 (29.55%)	13 del. 233,748 (20.71%)	248,676 (22.03%)	115,811 (10.26%)	88,068 (7.80%)	913 (0.08%)	9,198 (0.82%)	-	75,579 (6.70%)	15,543 (1.38%)	2,349 (0.21%)	766 (0.07%)	1,213 (0.11%)	-	3,009 (Note: Includes 2,450 votes for "None of the Names Shown" at 0.22%.) (0.27%)
April 17	0 (of 17)	Idaho caucuses 425 SDs	191 SDs (44.94%)	21 SDs (4.94%)	4 SDs (0.94%)	76 SDs (17.88%)	5 SDs (1.18%)	-	20 SDs (4.71%)	-	-	-	-	-	1 SDs (0.24%)	-	107 SDs (Note: All were Uncommitted.) (25.18%)
April 20	0 (of 12)	Vermont caucuses 1,146 SDs	504 SDs (43.98%)	18 SDs (1.57%)	1 SDs (0.09%)	309 SDs (26.96%)	1 SDs (0.09%)	2 SDs (0.17%)	2 SDs (0.17%)	-	-	-	-	-	-	-	165 SDs (Note: All were Uncommitted except two, which were pledged to Senator Edward Kennedy.) (14.40%)
April 25	102 (of 102)	Massachusetts primary 618,516	102 del. 325,673 (52.65%)	48,929 (7.91%)	45,807 (7.41%)	0 del. (Note: Technically won seven delegates, but these delegates were required to vote for McGovern on the first ballot.); 131,709 (21.29%)	8,499 (1.37%)	19,441 (3.14%)	0 del. (Note: Technically won five delegates; these delegates were technically required to vote for McGovern on the first ballot.); 22,398 (3.62%)	-	2,107 (0.34%)	8,736 (1.41%)	646 (0.10%)	874 (0.14%)	-	-	0 del. (Note: Technically Uncommmited won one delegate, but they were required to vote for McGovern on the first ballot.)3,697 (Note: Includes 2,348 write-in votes for Senator Edward Kennedy at 0.38%, and 589 votes for Edward T. Coll at 0.10%.) (0.60%)
April 25	0 (of 182)	Pennsylvania pres. primary 1,374,894	280,861 (20.43%)	481,900 (35.05%)	292,437 (21.27%)	279,983 (20.36%)	38,767 (2.82%)	-	336 WI (0.02%)	-	-	-	-	-	-	-	610 (Note: Includes 262 write-in votes for President Richard Nixon, at 0.02%.) (0.04%)
April 25	182 (Note: 45 delegates were technically named later, in mid-June, 27 by the elected delegates and 18 by the Democratic State Committee.) (of 182)	Pennsylvania del. primary	54 del. (Note: 14 delegates were named later, in June.)	74 del. (Note: 19 delegates were named later, in June.)	2 del.	40 del. (Note: 11 delegates were named later, in June.)	-	-	-	-	-	-	-	-	-	-	12 del. (Note: All were Uncommitted.) (Note: One delegate was named later, in June.)
April 28–30	11 (of 11)	Nevada state convention	4.95 del.	1.65 del.	-	-	-	-	-	-	-	-	-	-	-	-	4.40 del. (Note: All were Uncommitted.)
April 29	0 (of 47)	Kentucky caucuses 1,944 SDs	381 SDs (19.60%)	6 SDs (0.31%)	22 SDs (1.13%)	59 SDs (3.03%)	-	-	-	-	-	-	-	-	-	-	1,526 SDs (Note: All were Uncommitted bar one, who was pledged to Senator Edward Kennedy.) (78.50%)
May 2	29 (of 37)	Alabama del. convention	-	-	23 del.	-	-	-	-	-	-	-	-	-	-	-	6 del. (Note: All were part of an anti-Wallace slate.)
May 2	76 (of 76)	Indiana primary 751,458	-	49 del. 354,244 (47.14%)	27 del. 309,495 (41.19%)	87,719 (11.67%)	-	-	-	-	-	-	-	-	-	-	-
May 2	145 (of 153)	Ohio primary 1,205,194	66 del. 478,434 (39.70%)	74 del. 497,538 (41.28%)	-	105,903 (8.79%)	97,896 (8.12%)	-	-	-	-	25,423 (2.11%)	-	-	-	-	13 del. (Note: A slate of eight delegates supporting Cleveland Mayor Carl Stokes was elected in the 21st District, and a slate of five delegates supporting Congressman Wayne Hays was elected in the 18th District.)
May 2	20 (of 20)	Washington D.C. primary 29,560	-	-	-	-	-	-	-	-	-	-	-	-	-	20 del. 21,217 (71.78%)	8,343 (28.22%) (Note: All were Uncommitted.)
May 4	49 (of 49)	Tennessee primary 751,458	35,551 (7.22%)	78,350 (15.90%)	49 del. 335,858 (68.16%)	9,634 (1.96%)	5,896 (1.20%)	2,543 (0.52%)	18,809 (3.82%)	-	1,476 (0.30%)	2,267 (0.46%)	692 (0.14%)	1,621 (0.33%)	-	-	24 (0.01%)
May 5 (Note: Some district conventions were held earlier, in April.)	51 (of 64)	Minnesota district conventions	14 del.	26 del.	-	-	-	-	6 del.	-	-	-	-	-	-	-	-
May 6	57 (of 57)	North Carolina primary 821,410	-	-	37 del. 413,518 (50.34%)	30,739 (3.74%)	9,416 (1.15%)	-	61,723 (7.51%)	27 del. 306,014 (37.26%)	-	-	-	-	-	-	-
May 9	22 (of 22)	Nebraska primary 192,137	18 del. 79,309 (41.28%)	4 del. 65,968 (34.33%)	23,912 (12.45%)	6,886 (3.58%)	5,276 (2.75%)	377 (0.20%)	1,763 (0.92%)	-	1,244 (0.65%)	3,194 (1.66%)	3,459 (1.80%)	249 (0.13%)	-	-	500 (Note: Includes 293 write-in votes for Senator Edward Kennedy, at 0.15%.) (0.26%)
May 9	0 (of 35)	West Virginia pres. primary 368,484	-	246,596 (66.92%)	121,888 (33.08%)	-	-	-	-	-	-	-	-	-	-	-	-
May 9	35 (of 35)	West Virginia del. primary	7 del. (Note: Uncommitted by state law.)	14 del. (Note: Uncommitted by state law.)	-	5 del. (Note: Uncommitted by state law)	-	-	-	-	-	-	-	-	-	-	9 del. (Note: All were Uncommitted.)
May 12	11 (of 11)	Wyoming state convention	0.55 del.	-	-	-	-	-	-	-	-	-	-	-	-	-	10.45 del. (Note: All were Uncommitted.)
May 13	3 (of 3)	Canal Zone territorial convention	2.5 del.	-	-	-	-	-	-	-	-	-	-	-	-	-	0.5 del. (Note: All were Uncommitted.)
May 13	30 (of 35)	Kansas district conventions	12 del.	-	-	-	-	-	-	-	-	-	-	-	-	-	18 del. (Note: All were Uncommitted.)
May 13	44 (Note: Four delegates were picked on May 20.)(of 44)	Louisiana district conventions	10 del.	-	3 del.	-	-	-	-	-	-	-	-	-	-	-	32 del. (Note: All were Uncommitted.)
May 16	53 (of 53)	Maryland primary 568,131	6 del. 126,978 (22.35%)	6 del. 151,981 (26.75%)	41 del. 219,687 (38.67%)	13,363 (2.35%)	17,728 (3.12%)	4,776 (0.84%)	12,602 (2.22%)	-	2,168 (0.38%)	4,691 (0.83%)	13,584 (2.39%)	-	573 (0.10%)	-	-
May 16	132 (of 132)	Michigan primary 1,588,073	38 del. 425,694 (26.81%)	27 del. 249,798 (15.73%)	67 del. 809,239 (50.96%)	38,701 (2.44%)	6,938 (0.44%)	-	44,090 (2.78%)	-	-	-	-	2,862 (0.18%)	-	-	10,751 (Note: 10,700 votes were for an Uncommitted slate, at 0.67%.) (0.68%)
May 19	20 (of 20)	Maine state convention	-	-	-	20 del.	-	-	-	-	-	-	-	-	-	-	-
May 19–21	17 (of 17)	Hawaii state convention	1.5 del.	-	-	-	-	-	-	-	-	-	-	-	1.5 del.	-	14 del. (Note: All were Uncommitted.)
May 20	10 (of 44)	Iowa state convention	5 del.	-	-	3 del.	-	-	-	-	-	-	-	-	-	-	2 del. (Note: Both were Uncommitted.)
May 20	12 (of 12)	Vermont state convention	9 del.	-	-	3 del.	-	-	-	-	-	-	-	-	-	-	-
May 20	46 (of 52)	Washington district conventions	0 del. (Note: McGovern won eight delegates in these contests, but they were later replaced by Jackson delegates at the state convention.)	-	-	-	46 del.	-	-	-	-	-	-	-	-	-	-
May 23	55 (of 73)	Missouri district conventions	11 del.	-	-	-	-	-	-	-	-	-	-	-	-	-	44 del. (Note: All were Uncommitted.)
May 23	34 (of 34)	Oregon primary 408,644	34 del. 205,328 (50.25%)	51,163 (12.52%)	81,868 (20.03%)	10,244 (2.51%)	22,042 (5.39%)	1,208 (0.30%)	2,975 (0.73%)	-	5,082 (1.24%)	8,943 (2.19%)	-	-	6,500 (1.59%)	-	13,291 (Note: Includes 12,673 votes for Senator Edward Kennedy at 3.10%, and 480 write-in votes for President Richard Nixon at 0.12%.) (3.25%)
May 23	22 (of 22)	Rhode Island primary 37,864	22 del. 15,603 (41.21%)	7,701 (20.34%)	5,802 (15.32%)	7,838 (20.70%)	138 (0.36%)	41 (0.11%)	-	-	-	245 (0.65%)	6 (0.02%)	-	-	-	490 (Note: All votes were for an Uncommitted slate.) (1.29%)
May 26	10 (of 10)	Alaska state convention	-	-	-	-	-	-	-	-	-	-	-	-	-	-	10 del. (Note: All were Uncommitted.)
May 27	3 (of 3)	Guam territorial convention	1 del.	1.5 del.	-	0.5 del.	-	-	-	-	-	-	-	-	-	-	-
May 27	3 (of 3)	Virgin Islands territorial convention	-	-	-	-	-	-	-	-	-	-	-	-	-	-	3 del.
June 2	38 (of 51)	Connecticut district conventions	15 del.	-	-	-	-	-	-	-	-	-	-	-	-	-	23 del. (Note: All were Uncommitted.)
June 2	35 (of 47)	Kentucky district conventions	7 del.	-	-	-	-	-	-	-	-	-	-	-	-	-	28 del. (Note: All were Uncommitted.)
June 3	12 (of 47)	Kentucky state convention	3 del.	-	-	-	-	-	-	-	-	-	-	-	-	-	9 del. (Note: All were Uncommitted.)
June 3	30 (of 39)	Oklahoma district conventions	10 del.	-	-	-	-	-	-	-	-	-	-	-	-	-	20 del. (Note: All were Uncommitted.)
June 6	271 (of 271)	California primary 3,564,518	271 del. 1,550,652 (43.50%)	1,375,064 (38.58%)	268,551 WI (7.53%)	72,701 (2.04%)	28,901 (0.81%)	-	157,435 (4.42%)	-	26,246 (0.74%)	34,203 (0.96%)	50,745 (1.42%)	-	-	-	20 WI (1.59%)
June 6	17 (of 17)	South Dakota primary 28,017	17 del. 28,017 (100.00%)	-	-	-	-	-	-	-	-	-	-	-	-	-	-
June 6	0 (of 109)	New Jersey pres. primary 76,834	-	-	-	-	-	-	51,433 (66.94%)	25,401 (33.06%)	-	-	-	-	-	-	-
June 6	109 (of 109)	New Jersey del. primary	72 del.	10 del.	-	-	-	-	-	-	-	-	-	-	-	-	27 del. (Note: All were Uncommitted.)
June 6	18 (of 18)	New Mexico primary 153,293	10 del. 51,011 (33.28%)	39,768 (25.94%)	8 del. 44,843 (29.25%)	6,411 (4.18%)	4,236 (2.76%)	-	3,205 (2.09%)	-	-	-	-	-	-	-	3,819 (Note: All votes were for an Uncommitted slate.) (2.49%)
June 9	13 (of 64)	Minnesota state convention	5 del.	7 del.	-	-	-	-	1 del.	-	-	-	-	-	-	-	-
June 9	41 (of 53)	Virginia district conventions	18 del.	2 del.	-	1 del.	-	-	-	1 del.	-	-	-	-	-	-	19 del. (Note: All were Uncommitted.)
June 10	5 (of 35)	Kansas state convention	-	-	-	-	-	-	-	-	-	-	-	-	-	-	5 del. (Note: All were Uncommitted.)
June 10	18 (of 73)	Missouri state convention	-	-	-	-	-	-	-	-	-	-	-	-	-	-	18 del. (Note: All were Uncommitted.)
June 10	9 (of 39)	Oklahoma state convention	3 del. (Note: This was suspected, not confirmed.)	-	-	-	-	-	-	-	-	-	-	-	-	-	6 del. (Note: All were Uncommitted.)
June 10	12 (of 53)	Virginia state convention	9 del.	1 del.	-	-	-	-	2 del.	-	-	-	-	-	-	-	-
June 13	130 (of 130)	Texas state convention	34 del.	21 del.	42 del.	-	-	-	-	-	-	-	-	-	-	-	33 del. (Note: All were Uncommitted.)
June 16	27 (of 36)	Colorado district conventions	17 del.	6 del.	-	-	-	-	1 del.	-	-	-	-	-	-	-	13 del. (Note: All were Uncommitted.)
June 16	13 (of 51)	Connecticut state convention	5 del.	-	-	-	-	-	-	-	-	-	-	-	-	-	8 del. (Note: All were Uncommitted.)
June 16	17 (of 17)	Idaho state convention	7 del.	1 del.	-	3 del.	-	-	2 del.	-	-	-	-	-	-	-	4 del. (Note: All were Uncommitted.)
June 16	14 (of 14)	North Dakota state convention	7.7 del.	4.2 del.	-	-	-	-	-	-	-	-	-	-	-	-	2.1 del. (Note: All were Uncommitted.)
June 16	19 (of 19)	Utah state convention	11 del.	-	-	-	-	-	-	-	-	-	-	-	-	-	8 del. (Note: All were Uncommitted.)
June 17	17 (of 17)	Montana state convention	14.5 del.	-	-	-	-	-	1 del.	-	-	-	-	-	-	-	1.5 del. (Note: All were Uncommitted.)
June 17	7 (of 7)	Puerto Rico local convention	6 del.	0.5 del.	-	-	-	-	-	-	-	-	-	-	-	-	0.5 del. (Note: All were Uncommitted.)
June 18	9 (of 36)	Colorado state convention	7 del.	1 del.	-	-	-	-	-	-	-	-	-	-	-	-	1 del. (Note: Was Uncommitted.)
June 20	278 (Note: 30 were named on June 25 by the Democratic State Committee.)(of 278)	New York del. primary	251 del.	-	-	1 del.	-	-	4 del.	-	-	-	-	-	-	-	22 del. (Note: All were Uncommitted.)
June 23	6 (of 52)	Washington state convention	-	-	-	-	6 del.	-	-	-	-	-	-	-	-	-	-
June 24	27 (of 27)	Arkansas state convention	-	-	-	-	-	27 del.	-	-	-	-	-	-	-	-	-
June 24	13 (of 13)	Delaware state convention	5.85 del.	-	-	-	-	-	-	-	-	-	-	-	-	-	7.15 del. (Note: All were Uncommitted.)
Total; 3,016 pledged delegates 16,207,757 votes			1319.55 4,051,565 (25.00%)	345.85 4,119,230 (25.42%)	371 3,755,424 (23.17%)	172.5 1,838,314 (11.34%)	52 504,596 (3.11%)	28 37,401 (0.23%)	22 430,733 (2.66%)	28 331,415 (2.04%)	6 196,406 (1.21%)	0 553,352 (3.41%)	0 79,446 (0.49%)	0 11,798 (0.07%)	1.5 8,286 (0.05%)	20 20,717 (0.13%)	618.6 47,518 (0.29%)
Suspected delegate count as of June 27			1,466.15 (48.61%)	385.50 (12.78%)	377 (12.50%)	208.85 (6.92%)	53.75 (1.78%)	30.55 (1.01%)	23.65 (0.78%)	27 (0.90%)	0 (0.00%)	0 (0.00%)	0 (0.00%)	0 (0.00%)	0 (0.00%)	0 (0.00%)	441.25 (Note: Includes one delegate supporting Louisiana Governor Edward Edwards, and five delegates supporting Congressman Wayne Hays of Ohio.) (14.63%)

=== Results by county ===
1972 Democratic primary results by county popular vote (Note: In Iowa, the results by county were not recorded; results were recorded by congressional district.) McGovern: McGovern—20–30%; McGovern—30–40%; McGovern—40–50%; McGovern—50–60%; McGovern—60–70%; McGovern—70–80%; McGovern—90–100%; Humphrey: Humphrey—20–30%; Humphrey—30–40%; Humphrey—40–50%; Humphrey—50–60%; Humphrey—60–70%; Humphrey—70–80%; Wallace: Wallace—20–30%; Wallace—30–40%; Wallace—40–50%; Wallace—50–60%; Wallace—60–70%; Wallace—70–80%; Wallace—80–90%; Muskie: Muskie—30–40%; Muskie—40–50%; Muskie—50–60%; Muskie—60–70%; Muskie—70–80%; Muskie—80–90%; Chisholm: Chisholm—50–60%; Chisholm—60–70%; Chisholm—70–80%; Chisholm—80–90%; Sanford: Sanford—30–40%; Sanford—40–50%; Sanford—50–60%; Sanford—60–70%; McCarthy: McCarthy—40–50%; Fauntroy: Fauntroy—70–80%; Uncommitted: Uncommitted—30–40%; Tie: Tie—50%

1972 Democratic primary results by county popular vote: George McGovern (red) Hubert Humphrey (blue) George Wallace (green) / Edmund Muskie (brown) Eugene McCarthy (black) Shirley Chisholm (gold) / Terry Sanford (orange) Scoop Jackson (pink) Uncommitted (yellow)

=== Total primaries popular vote ===
1972 Democratic Party presidential primaries
Candidate	Votes	%
Hubert H. Humphrey	4,121,372	25.8
George S. McGovern	4,053,451	25.3
George C. Wallace	3,755,424	23.5
Edmund S. Muskie	1,840,217	11.5
Eugene J. McCarthy	553,955	3.5
Henry M. Jackson	505,198	3.2
Shirley A. Chisholm	430,703	2.7
James T. Sanford	331,415	2.1
John V. Lindsay	196,406	1.2
Sam W. Yorty	79,446	0.5
Wilbur D. Mills	37,401	0.2
Walter E. Fauntroy	21,217	0.1
Unpledged delegates	19,533	0.1
Edward M. Kennedy	16,693	0.1
Rupert V. Hartke	11,798	0.1
Patsy M. Mink	8,286	0.1
"None of the names shown"	6,269	0
Others	5,181	0
Total votes	15,993,965	100

=== Analysis ===
In the end, McGovern succeeded in winning the nomination by winning primaries through grass-roots support in spite of establishment opposition. He had led a commission to redesign the Democratic nomination system after the messy and confused nomination struggle and convention of 1968. The fundamental principle of the McGovern-Fraser Commission—that the Democratic primaries should determine the winner of the Democratic nomination—lasted throughout every subsequent nomination contest. However, the new rules angered many prominent Democrats whose influence was marginalized, and those politicians refused to support McGovern's campaign (some even supporting Nixon instead), leaving the McGovern campaign at a significant disadvantage in funding compared to Nixon.

== See also ==
- 1972 Republican Party presidential primaries
