= Biscayne Point =

Coordinates: 25.865557°N 80.129213°W

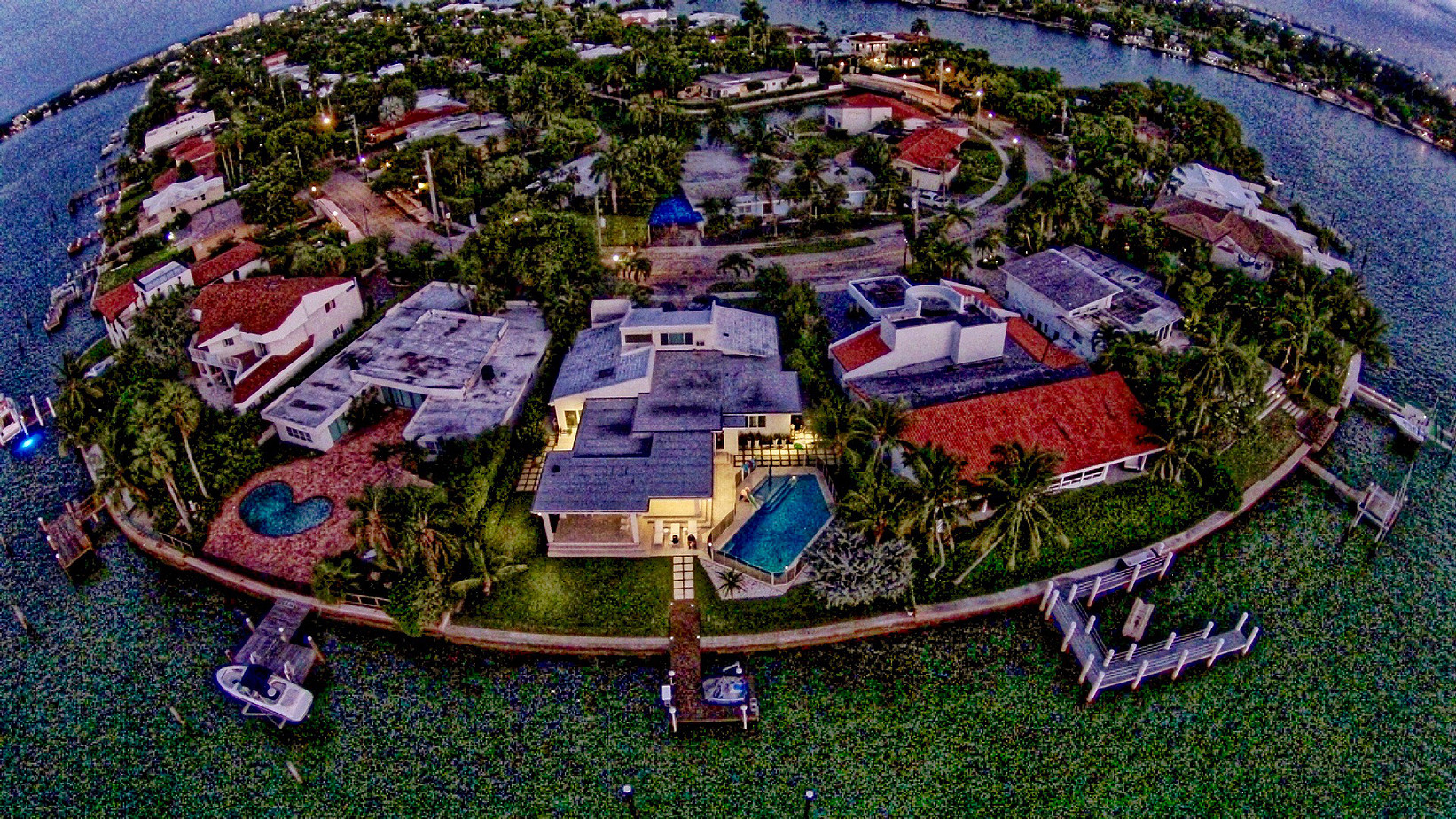
Biscayne Point Biscayne Point at dusk
- Neighborhood of Miami Beach
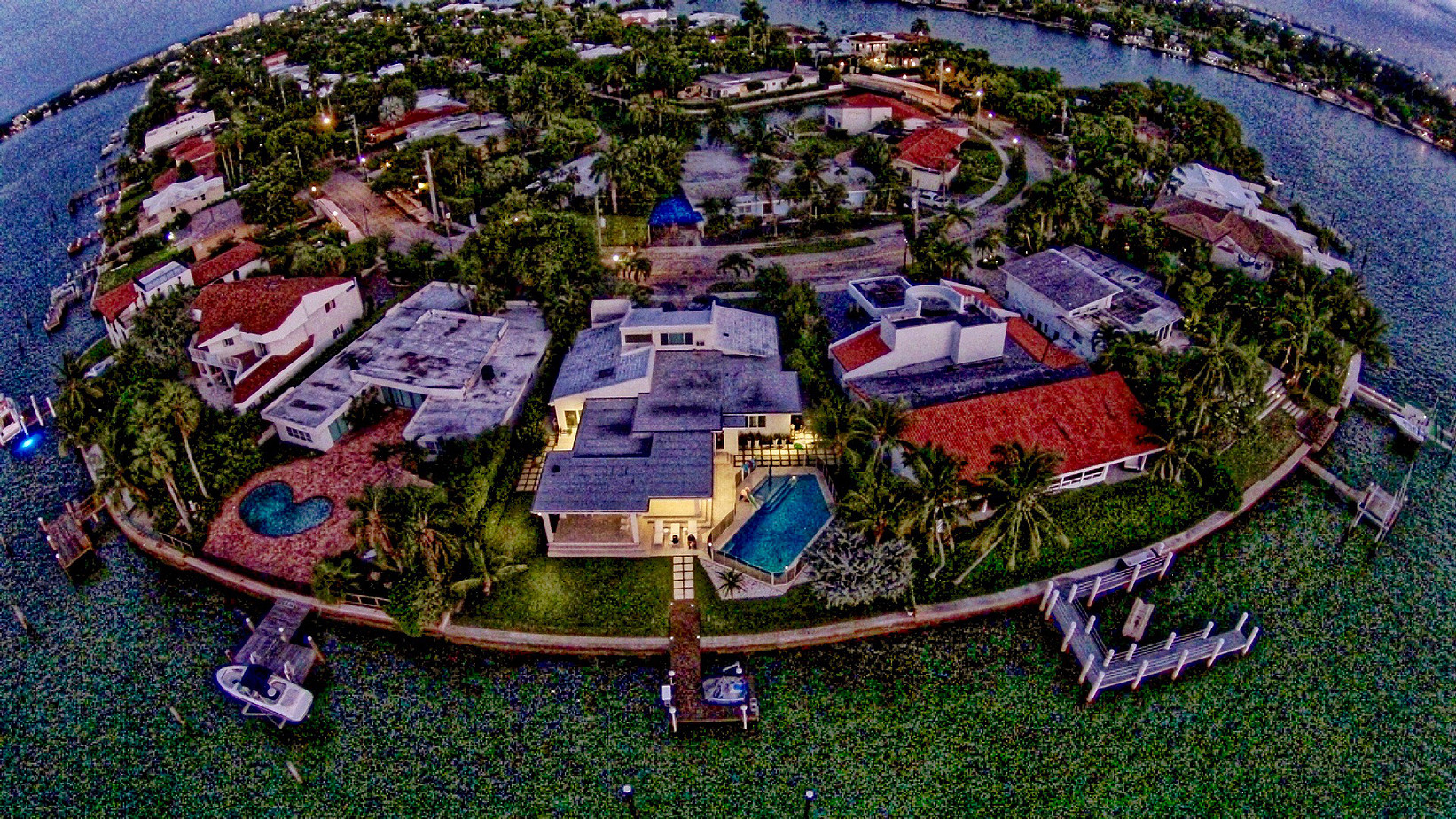
- Interactive map of Biscayne Point Biscayne Point at dusk
- Country: United States
- State: Florida
- County: Miami-Dade County
- City: Miami Beach

Government
  - Miami Beach Mayor: Dan Gelber
  - Miami-Dade County Commissioner: Sally Heyman
  - House of Representatives: David Richardson
  - State Senate: Gwen Margolis (D)
  - U.S. House: Debbie Wasserman Schultz (D)

Area
  - Total: 0.392 sq mi (1.02 km^{2})
- Elevation: 3 ft (0.91 m)

Population (2010)
  - Total: 4,513
- Time zone: UTC-05 (EST)
- ZIP Code: 33141
- Area codes: 305, 786

Biscayne Point is a neighborhood of North Beach in the city of Miami Beach, Florida. It is located just west of the main island that the city occupies, in the area of the city referred to as North Beach. It is actually on three islands, just north of Normandy Shores. Bridges connect the three islands which are accessible from 77th Street and from 85th Street by vehicles and from a pedestrian bridge at 80th Street.

Two public parks are available. The northern one is Stillwater Park and the southern is Crespi Park.

== Education ==
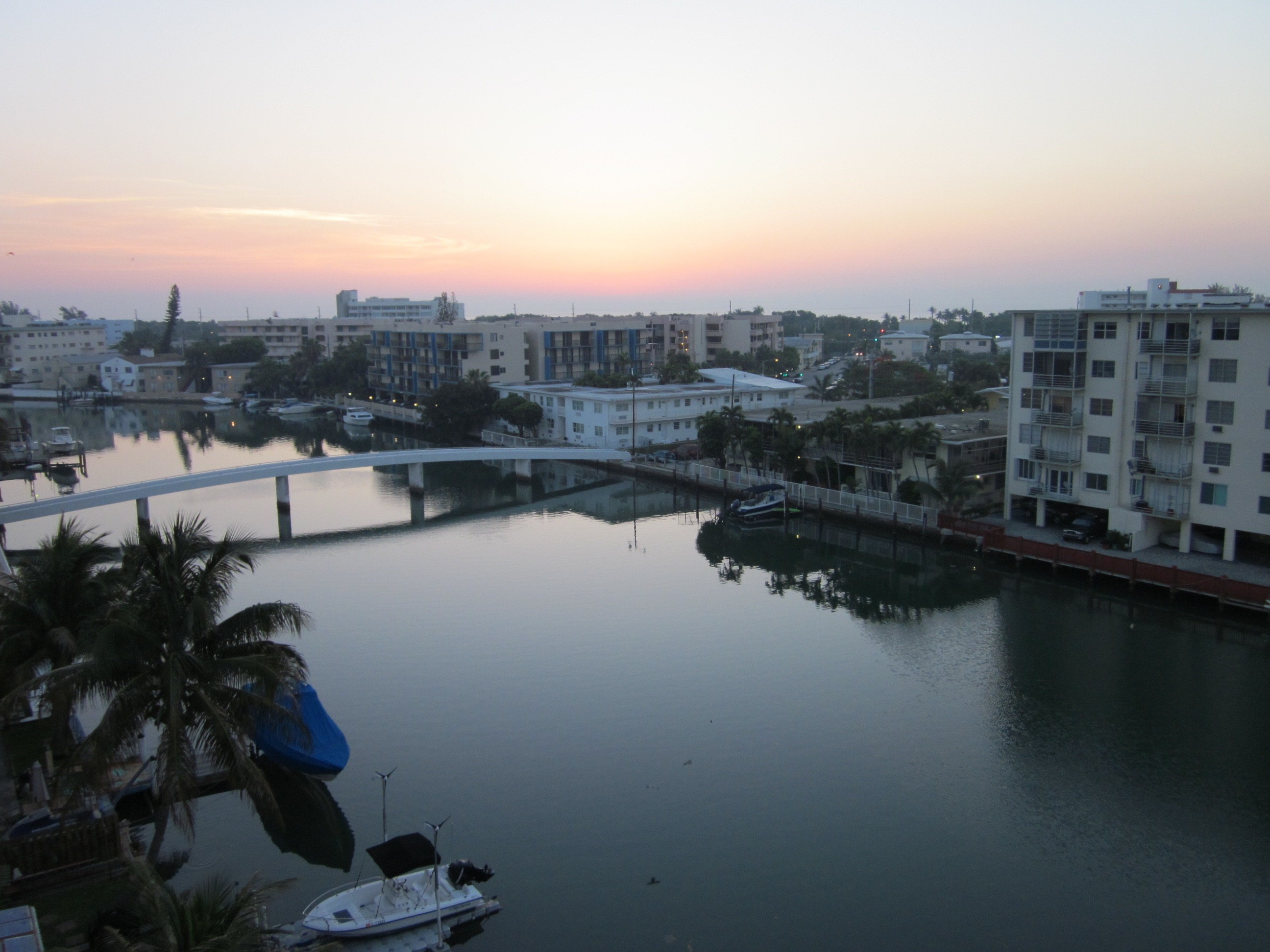
Pedestrian Bridge at 80th

Miami-Dade County Public Schools is the local school district. Biscayne Beach Elementary School is the local elementary school. Miami Beach Nautilus Middle School and Miami Beach Senior High School serve North Bay Village.
