= Bayshore (Miami Beach) =

Coordinates: 25.807464°N 80.132217°W

- Neighborhood of Miami Beach
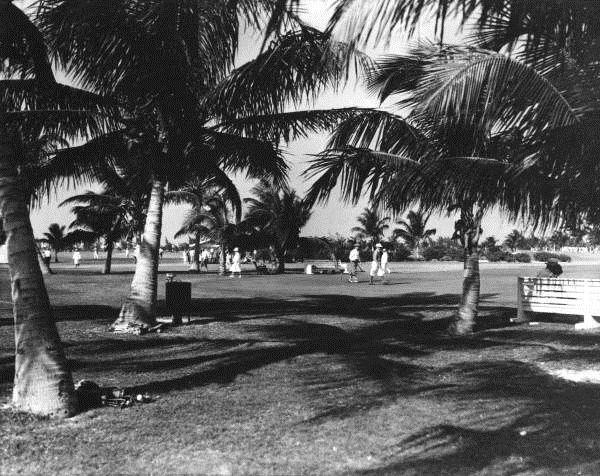
- Golf course in Bayshore, 1928
- Interactive map of Bayshore
- Country: United States
- State: Florida
- County: Miami-Dade County
- City: Miami Beach

Government
  - Miami Beach Mayor: Dan Gelber
  - Miami-Dade County Commissioner: Sally Heyman
  - House of Representatives: Cynthia Stafford (D)
  - State Senate: Gwen Margolis (D)
  - U.S. House: Debbie Wasserman Schultz (D)

Area
  - Total: 1.626 sq mi (4.21 km^{2})
- Elevation: 3 ft (0.91 m)

Population (2010)
  - Total: 5,790
  - Density: 3,562/sq mi (1,375/km^{2})
- Time zone: UTC-05 (EST)
- ZIP Code: 33139, 33140
- Area codes: 305, 786

Bayshore is a neighborhood of Mid-Beach in the city of Miami Beach, Florida, United States. It is located in the center portion of the main island that the city occupies. Originally built around Carl Fisher's Bayshore Golf and Country Club, with a course designed by H.C. Tippet which opened in 1923, the area is roughly bound by the Collins Canal to the south, 41st Street to the north, Indian Creek to the east, and Biscayne Bay to the west. The neighborhood is characterized largely by single family homes and municipal uses (Miami Beach Golf Club, Miami Beach High School, Scott Rakow Youth Center).
