= Normandy Shores =

Normandy Shores is an island and neighborhood within the city of Miami Beach in Miami-Dade County, Florida, United States. It is located just west of the main island that the city occupies, in the area of the city referred to as North Beach. It is located just north of and separated from the Isle of Normandy by a canal. A bridge connects the two islands. Its ZIP code is 33141.

== Geography ==
It is located at 25.86°N 80.139°W, with an elevation 3 feet (0.91 m).
