= Senator Steinberg =

Senator Steinberg may refer to:

- Cathey Steinberg (born 1942), Georgia State Senate
- Darrell Steinberg (born 1959), California State Senate
- Melvin Steinberg (1933–2026), Maryland State Senate
- Paul B. Steinberg (born 1940), Florida State Senate

== See also ==
- Bob Steinburg (born 1948), North Carolina State Senate
