= Florida's 105th House of Representatives district =

American legislative district

Florida's 105th State House of Representatives district
Representative
Marie Woodson; D–Hollywood
- Registration: 75.8% Democratic; 23.2% Republican; 1.1% No party preference
- Demographics: 18.6% White; 40.3% Black; 39.7% Hispanic; 3.4% Asian; 1.6% Native American; 0.2% Hawaiian/Pacific Islander
- Population (2020) • Voting age: 183,727; 18

Florida's 105th House district elects one member of the Florida House of Representatives. The district is represented by Marie Woodson.

The district covers parts of Broward and Miami-Dade counties.

As of the 2020 census, the district's population is 183,727.

== Representatives from 1967 – present ==
Representatives	Party	Years of service	Hometown	Notes
Bob Graham	Democratic	1967 – November 3, 1970		Elected to State Senate
Sherman Winn	Democratic	November 3, 1970 – November 7, 1972		Elected to the State Senate
Joe Lang Kershaw	Democratic	November 7, 1972 – November 2, 1982		First African-American legislator in the state of Florida since the reconstruction era.
Harold Spaet	Democratic	November 2, 1982 – November 6, 1984		
Alberto Gutman	Republican	November 6, 1984 – November 3, 1992		
Mike Abrams	Democratic	November 3, 1992 – November 8, 1994		
Sally Heyman	Democratic	November 8, 1994 – 2002		elected to Miami-Dade Commissioner
Kenneth Gottlieb	Democratic	November 5, 2002 – November 7, 2006		
Joseph Gibbons	Democratic	November 7, 2006 – November 6, 2012		
Carlos Trujillo	Republican	November 6, 2012 – November 6, 2018		Resigned to become United States Ambassador to the Organization of American States
Ana Maria Rodriguez	Republican	November 6, 2018 – November 3, 2020		Elected to the State Senate
David Borrero	Republican	November 3, 2020 – November 9, 2022		
Marie Woodson	Democratic	November 9, 2022 – Present	Hollywood	
