= Alberto Gutman =

Cuban-American politician (1959–2019)

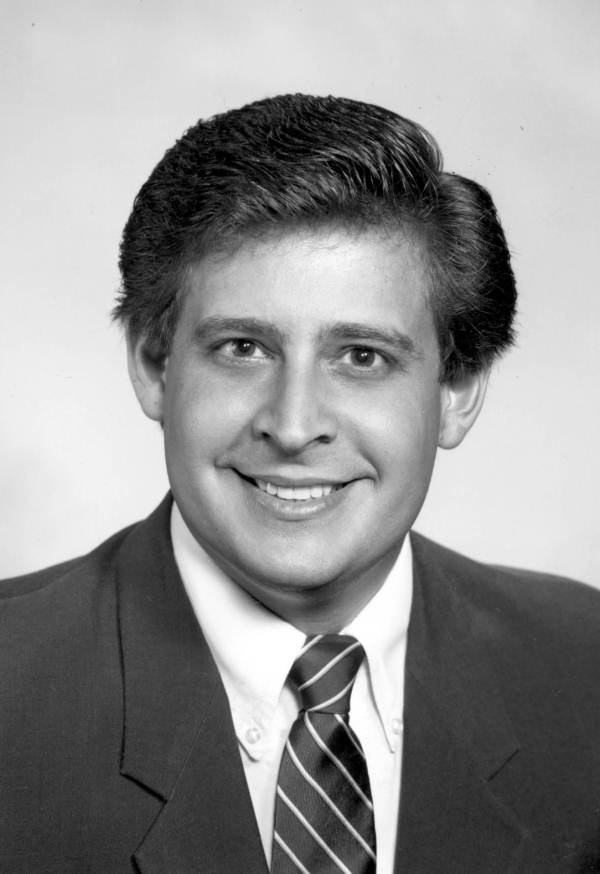

Member of the Florida Senate from the 34th district
- In office November 3, 1992 – October 27, 1999
- Preceded by: Lincoln Díaz-Balart
- Succeeded by: Alex Díaz de la Portilla

Member of the Florida House of Representatives from the 105th district
- In office November 6, 1984 – November 3, 1992
- Preceded by: Harold Spaet
- Succeeded by: Mike Abrams

Personal details
- Born: January 4, 1959 Havana, Cuba
- Died: February 16, 2019 (aged 60) Miami, Florida, U.S.
- Party: Republican
- Spouse: Marci Rabinowitz
- Children: 2
- Education: Miami Dade College (AA); University of Miami (BBA)

Alberto Gutman (January 4, 1959 – February 16, 2019) was a Cuban-American politician. Born to a Jewish family in Havana, Cuba, he moved to the United States when he was 6 years old.

== Early life ==
He lived and went to school in Miami Beach, Florida.

He entered politics and became a member of the Republican Party. He was elected Member of Florida House of Representatives, 1984–92; member of Florida Senate 34th District, 1992–99.

He was a member of the Freemasons, B'nai B'rith, Phi Kappa Phi, and Phi Theta Kappa.

He was married and had two daughters.

== Career ==
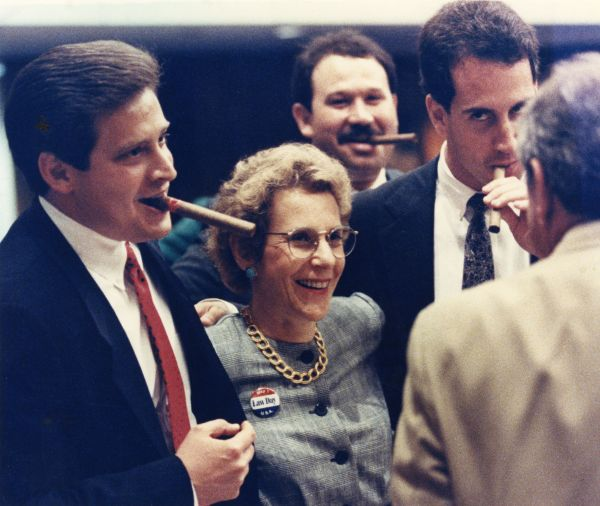
Gutman smoking cigars with members of the Florida House of Representatives

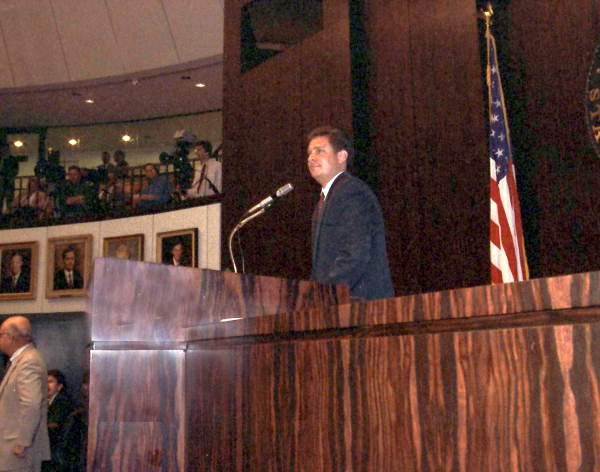
Gutman addressing his colleagues in the Senate chamber

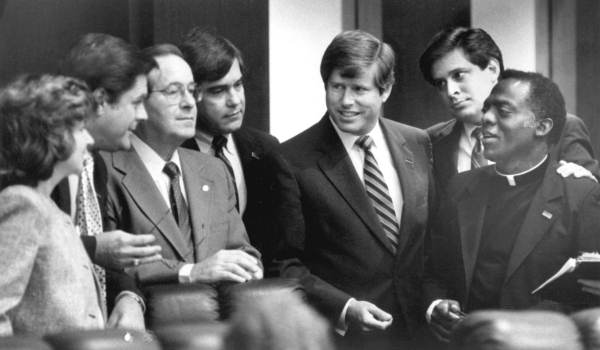
Gutman listening to Father Sergio Carrillo of St.John the Apostle Church in Hialeah, Florida, along with other members of the Florida House of Representatives

In 1992 he won his first election to the Florida Senate defeating Democrat Kendall Coffey.

Gutman accused his opponent in the 1998 senatorial election of using voodoo against him after Santería paraphernalia was tossed at him and scattered on his vehicle by his opponent's supporters; Gutman won the election.

== Resignation and Conviction ==
He was indicted on 32 counts for benefiting from a fake health care company that he had set up to defraud Medicare of $15,000,000. Gutman then resigned his post as Chairman of the Florida Senate Health Care Committee over alleged improprieties in brokering a Medicaid health plan during his term as vice chairman of the committee.

He was charged with conspiracy, money laundering, and witness tampering. He was found guilty and sentenced to five years in prison with three year’s probation, ordered to pay victims $98,175 in restitution and fined $50,000 in 1999.

== Death ==
Gutman died on February 16, 2019, at his home in Miami, Florida.

== Electoral history ==
Date	Position	Status	Opponent	Result	Vote share	Top-opponent vote share
1984	State Representative	Incumbent	Harold W. Spaet (D)	Elected	58.01%	41.99%
1986	State Representative	Incumbent	A. J. Daoud (D)	Re-elected	63.40%	36.60%
1988	State Representative	Incumbent	Ran unopposed	Re-elected	100.00%	0%
1990	State Representative	Incumbent	Steve Leifman (D)	Re-elected	58.89%	41.11%
1992	State Senator	Open-seat	Kendall Coffey (D)	Elected	56.68%	43.32%
1994	State Senator	Incumbent	Ran unopposed	Re-elected	100.00%	0%
1998	State Senator	Incumbent	Agustin "Gus" Garcia (D)	Re-elected	50.23%	49.77%

Florida House of Representatives
Preceded by Harold Spaet	Member of the Florida House of Representatives from the 105th district 1984–1992	Succeeded by Mike Abrams
Florida Senate
Preceded by Lincoln Díaz-Balart	Member of the Florida Senate from the 34th district 1992–1999	Succeeded by Alex Díaz de la Portilla
