= North Beach (Miami Beach) =

Coordinates: 25.8594°N 80.1281°W

- Neighborhood of Miami Beach
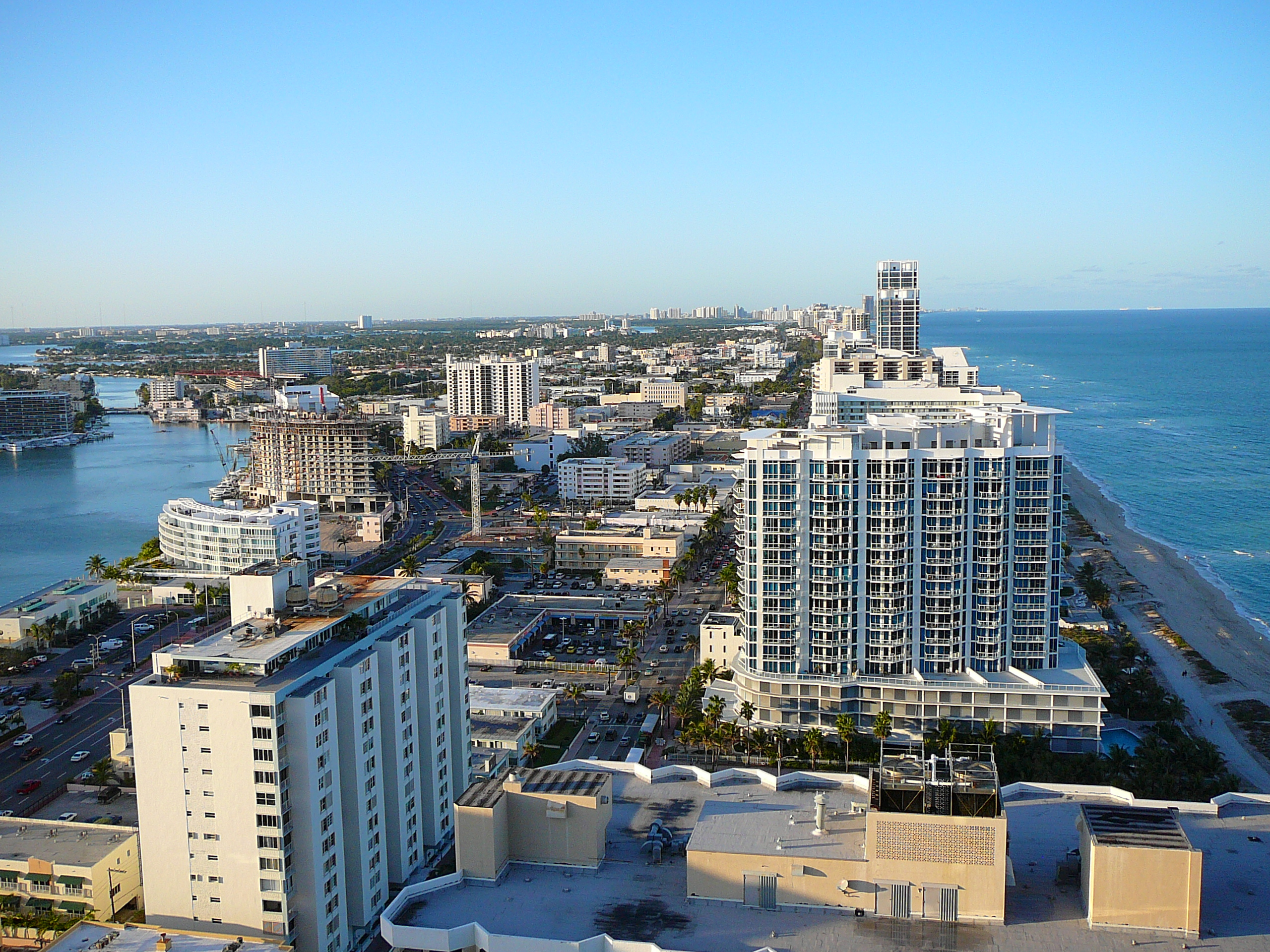
- Most of the North Beach area as seen from the Akoya Condominiums facing north, 2008
- Interactive map of North Beach
- Country: United States
- State: Florida
- County: Miami-Dade County
- City: Miami Beach
- Subdistricts of North Beach: Neighborhoods list: Biscayne Point; Isle of Normandy; La Gorce

Government
  - Miami Beach Mayor: Steven Meiner
  - Miami-Dade County Commissioner: Sally Heyman
  - Florida House of Representatives: Michael Grieco (D)
  - State Senate: Jason Pizzo (D)
  - U.S. House: Maria Elvira Salazar (R)

Population (2010)
  - Total: 27,563
- Time zone: UTC-05 (EST)
- ZIP Code: 33140, 33141
- Area codes: 305, 786

North Beach is a neighborhood of the city of Miami Beach, Florida. It is the northernmost section of the city, roughly bound by 63rd Street and Indian Creek Drive to the south and 87th Terrace to the north. It collectively refers to neighborhoods including Isles of Normandy, Biscayne Point, and La Gorce.

According to the 2013 census, North Beach is home to more than 43,250 people of which 49.9% are foreign born persons. 65.5% speak languages other than English at home. The median household income in North Beach is estimated to be $40,775 between 2009 and 2013.

The total estimated land area of North Beach is estimated to be 4.83 square miles, with a population density of approximately 8,602.2 people per square mile according to the 2010 census.

Public transportation includes the North Beach Loop of Miami Beach's road trolley system.

== See also ==
- Mid-Beach
- South Beach
