= Mid-Beach =

- Neighborhood of Miami Beach
- Interactive map of Mid-Beach
- Country: United States
- State: Florida
- County: Miami-Dade County
- City: Miami Beach
- Subdistricts of Mid-Beach: Neighborhoods list: Bayshore; Nautilus

Government
  - Miami Beach Mayor: Steven Meiner
  - Miami-Dade County Commissioner: Micky Steinberg
  - House of Representatives: Ashley Gantt (D)
  - State Senate: Shevrin Jones (D)
  - U.S. House: Debbie Wasserman Schultz (D)

Population (2010)
  - Total: 9,794
- Time zone: UTC-05 (EST)
- ZIP Code: 33139, 33140
- Area codes: 305, 786

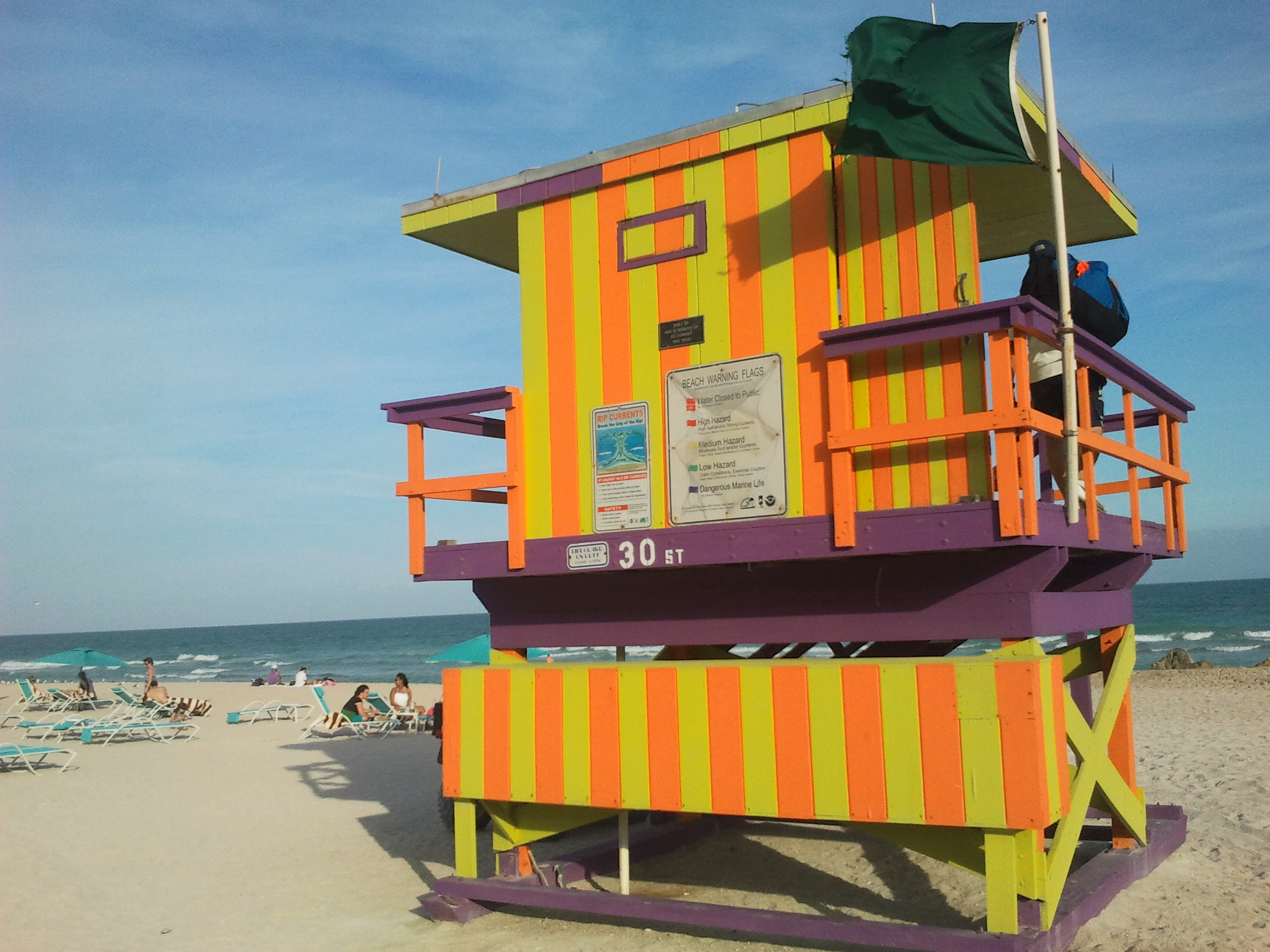
Baywatch at 30th Street

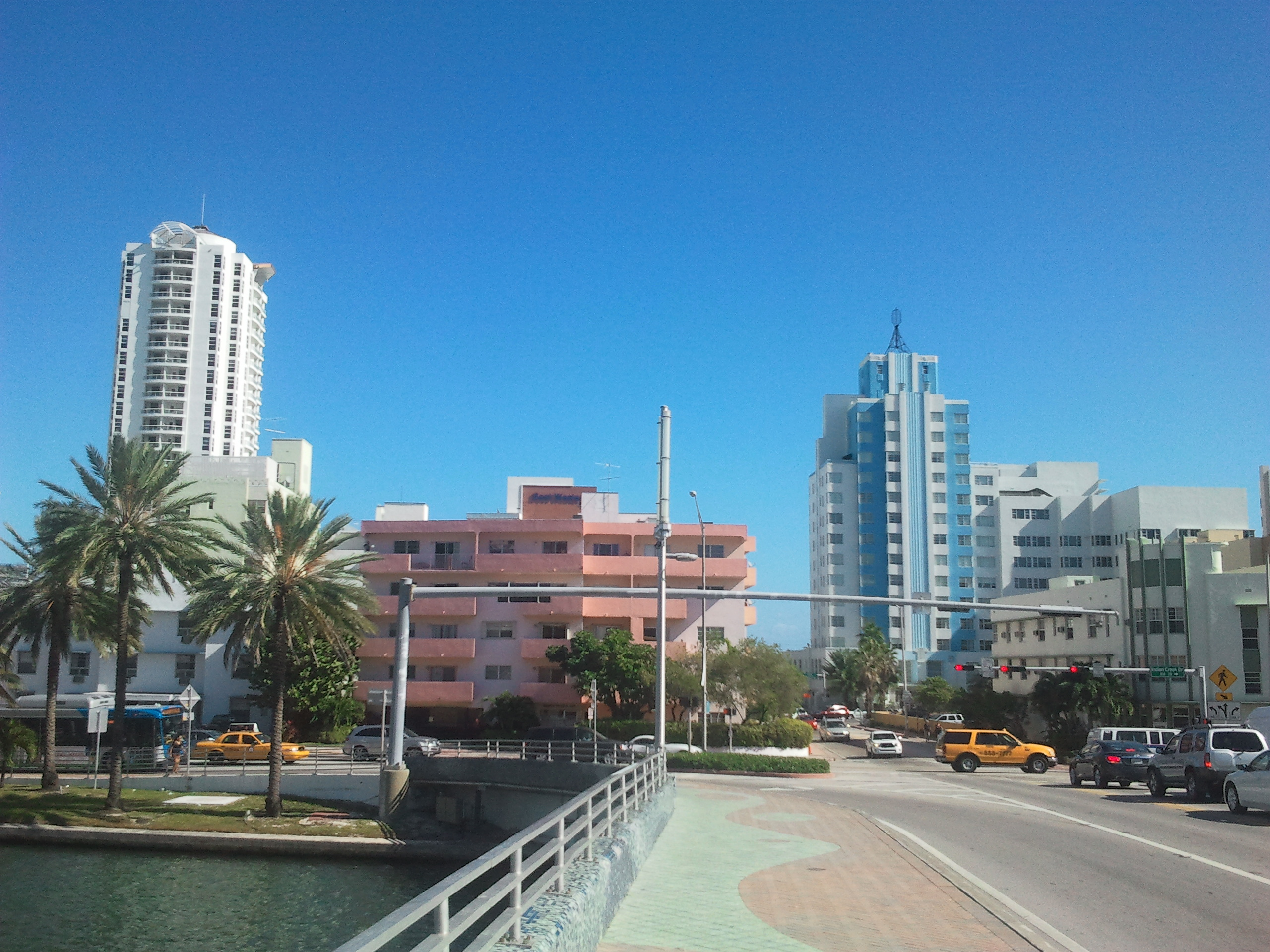
Bridge over Indian Creek at 41st Street

Mid-Beach is a neighborhood in Miami Beach, Florida.

Famous buildings in the Oceanfront neighborhood are the Fontainebleau Hotel, the Eden Roc, Faena Hotel Miami Beach, Faena Forum, the Ocean Spray Hotel, and the Blue and Green Diamond.

The historic Collins Waterfront Architectural District is part of Mid-Beach.

== See also ==
- South Beach
- North Beach
