= Isle of Normandy =

Neighborhood of Miami Florida, United States

- Neighborhood of Miami Beach
- Interactive map of Isle of Normandy
- Country: United States
- State: Florida
- County: Miami-Dade County
- City: Miami Beach

Government
  - Miami Beach Mayor: Dan Gelber
  - Miami-Dade County Commissioner: Sally Heyman
  - State House: Michael Grieco (D)
  - State Senate: Jason Pizzo (D)
  - U.S. House: Donna Shalala (D)
- Elevation: 3 ft (0.91 m)

Population (2010)
  - Total: 8,841
- Time zone: UTC-05 (EST)
- ZIP Code: 33141
- Area codes: 305, 786

Isle of Normandy or Normandy Island or Normandy Isles or Normandy Isle is a neighborhood of North Beach in the city of Miami Beach, Florida. It is located along the eastern shore of Biscayne Bay.

== Geography ==
It is located at 25.853°N 80.135°W, with an elevation 3 feet (0.91 m).

== History ==
After building a chain of movie theaters in Cincinnati, Alsace native Henri Levi (or Levy) moved to Miami Beach in 1922. In 1926 he undertook a 2-year period of 24-hour-a-day dredging to create Normandy Isle from the natural swampy land mass in Biscayne Bay west of 71st street theretofore called Warner-Meade Island. Levy was also instrumental in the construction of the 79th Street Causeway.

== Streets ==
Most streets on Normandy Isle were named after French cities and architectural landmarks.

East-West

- Bay Drive
- Biarritz Drive
- Biarritz Court
- 71st Street (originally Everglades Concourse)
- Maimonides Street
- Everglades Court (alley)
- Normandy Drive
- Normandy Court
- Marseille Drive
- Calais Drive

North-South

- Brest Esplanade
- Rue Vendome
- Vendome Court
- Rue Versailles
- Versailles Court
- Vichy Drive
- Rue Notre Dame
- Rue Bordeaux
- Trouville Esplanade
- Rue Granville
- Verdun Drive

== Education ==
Miami-Dade County Public Schools is the local school district. Treasure Island Elementary School in North Bay Village serves Normandy Island. Miami Beach Nautilus Middle School and Miami Beach Senior High School serve Normandy Island.

== Notable residents ==
- Joan Field, concert violinist
- Roy Firestone, sportscaster and entertainer
- Andy Garcia, actor
- David M. Gersten, appeals court judge
- Bob Mover, jazz saxophonist
- Clifford S. Perlman, restaurateur
- Daniel Schechter, psychiatrist and author
