= Robert M. Brake =

American politician

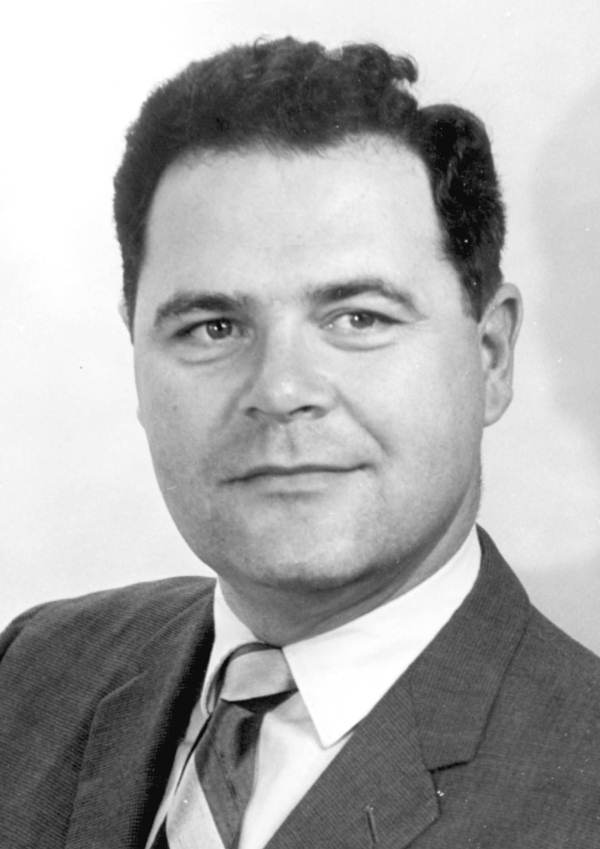
- Brake in 1966

Member of the Florida House of Representatives from Dade County
- In office 1966–1967

Personal details
- Died: March 1, 2000 (aged 73)
- Party: Democratic
- Education: University of Chicago Law School; University of Michigan Law School

Robert M. Brake (died March 1, 2000) was an American politician. He served as a Democratic member of the Florida House of Representatives.

== Life and career ==
Brake attended the University of Chicago Law School and the University of Michigan Law School. He practiced law at the Turner, Hendrick, Fascell & Brake law firm before starting his own practice.

Brake was a Dade County commissioner from 1962 to 1964 and had also been the Coral Gables Commissioner.

He served in the United States Army during World War II as well as the Korean conflict retiring from the Air Force at the rank of Colonel.

In 1966, Brake was elected to the Florida House of Representatives, serving until 1967.

Brake was opposed to abortion stating "Roe vs. Wade has poisoned American life". He was also against gay rights and led the flight to repeal Dade's 1977 anti-gay discrimination ordinance.

Brake died on March 1, 2000, at the age of 73. He had been fighting melanoma for 32 years. He was survived by his wife Eileen and five children.
