= Harold Spaet =

American politician (1944–2023)

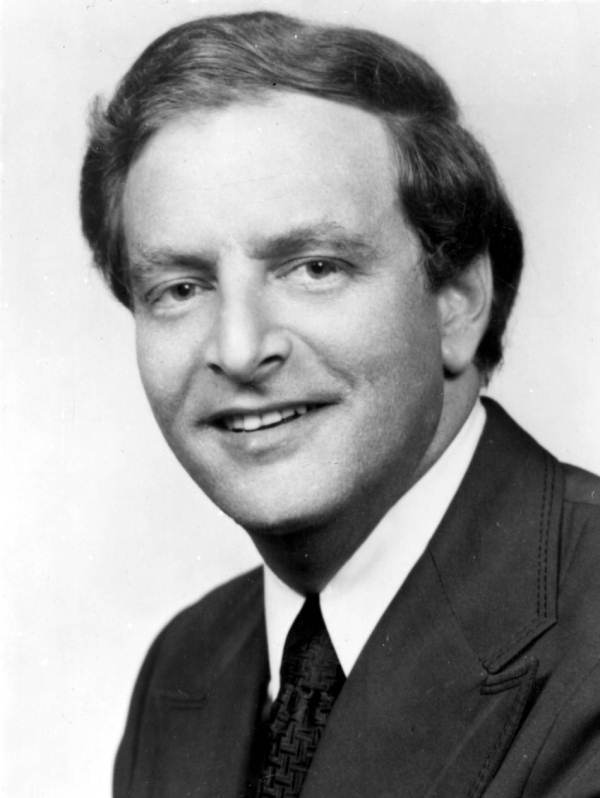

Member of the Florida House of Representatives
- In office November 7, 1978 – November 6, 1984
- Preceded by: Paul B. Steinberg
- Succeeded by: Alberto Gutman
- Constituency: 101st district (1978–1982); 105th district (1982–1984)

Personal details
- Born: August 1, 1944 Miami Beach, Florida
- Died: May 30, 2023 (aged 78) Miami Beach, Florida
- Party: Democratic
- Education: University of Miami (B.A., J.D.)
- Occupation: Attorney

Harold W. Spaet (August 1, 1944 – May 30, 2023) was an American politician. He served as a Democratic member for the 101st and 105th district of the Florida House of Representatives.

Spaet attended the University of Miami, where he earned a bachelor's degree in 1966, and the University of Miami School of Law, where he earned a Juris Doctor in 1969. In 1978, Spaet was elected for the 101st district of the Florida House of Representatives, succeeding Paul B. Steinberg. In 1982, Spaet was succeeded by Mike Abrams in the 101st District and elected for the 105th district. He was succeeded by Alberto Gutman in 1984.
