= Joe Lang Kershaw =

American politician

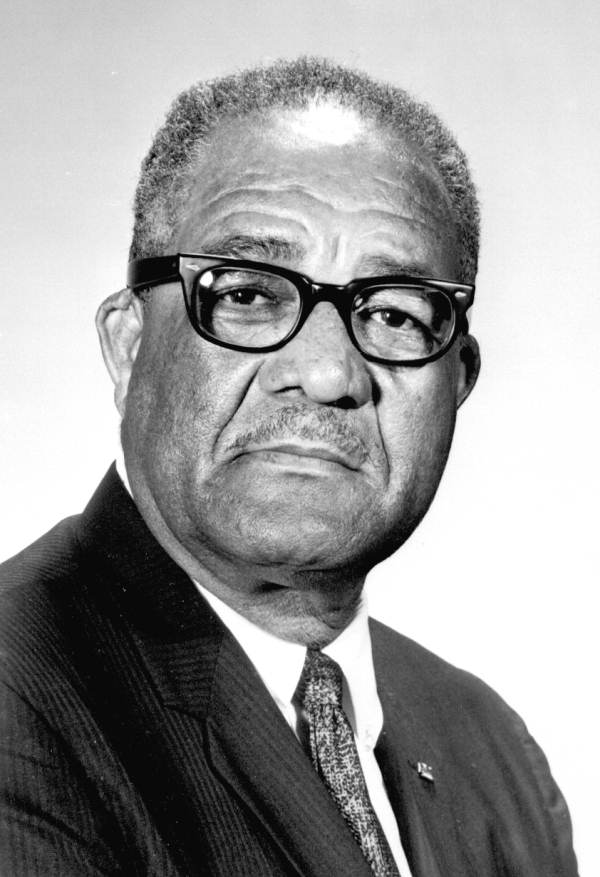

Member of the Florida House of Representatives from the 105th district
- In office 1968–1982
- Preceded by: Sherman Winn
- Succeeded by: Harold Spaet

Personal details
- Born: June 27, 1911 Live Oak, Florida
- Died: November 7, 1999 (aged 88) Miami, Florida
- Party: Democratic
- Spouse: Mamie Newton
- Children: Joseph Lang Kershaw, Jr.
- Education: Florida A&M University (BA); Florida A&M University (MA)
- Nickname: Cane Pole

Joe Lang Kershaw, Sr. (June 27, 1911 – November 7, 1999) was an American politician, civics teacher, and a graduate of Florida A&M University. Kershaw is the first African-American legislator in the state of Florida since the reconstruction era.

== Education ==
While attending Florida A&M University in the early 1930s, Kershaw worked part time at the Florida Capitol complex as a janitor. Sometimes after hours he would stand on the Speaker's podium and pretend he was addressing the Florida House of Representatives. While attending Florida A&M University he became a lifelong member of the Kappa Alpha Psi fraternity. He graduated with a degree in history in 1935.

== Career ==
After graduating, Kershaw taught civics at a Coral Gables junior high school in Dade County, renamed Miami-Dade County in 1997. In 1955 he earned his Master of Education degree from Florida A&M University. While living in Miami, he served on the Miami Economic Advisory Board, and was a member of the Knights of Columbus and the Holy Name Society.

Kershaw was elected to the Florida House of Representatives in November 1968, to represent the Florida 99th district, which at the time covered mostly Dade County. Upon being elected, he became the first African-American legislator in the state of Florida since Reconstruction. Kershaw served as chairman of the Elections Committee and introduced legislation that lead to the formation of the Florida Human Rights Commission. In 1971, Kershaw maneuvered Florida Statute 241.477 through the legislature, which lead to the creation of the Black Archives at Florida A&M University. He was known in the Florida House of Representatives as "Cane Pole," due to his ongoing battle to exclude cane pole fishing from requiring a license. The requirement was finally abolished in 1976, allowing people to fish in their own county with a cane pole, a common practice among poor African American people in Florida. He served in the Florida House of Representatives for 14 years until 1982.

== Death ==
He died of heart failure at a hospital in 1999.

== Legacy ==
One of his legal assistants, Arthenia Joyner went on to her own career as a legislator later she graduated from Florida A&M University.
