= Mike Abrams (politician) =

American politician (born 1947)

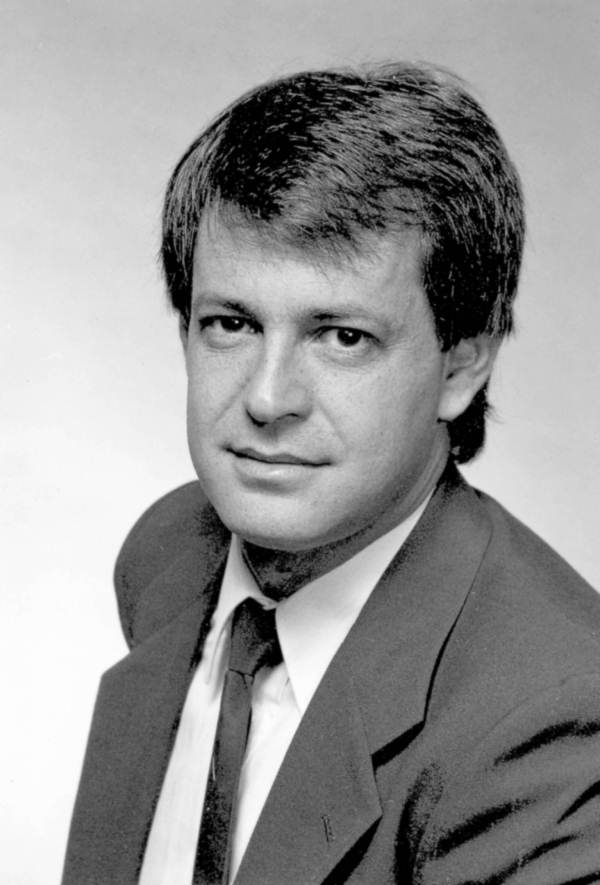

Member of the Florida House of Representatives
- In office November 2, 1982 – November 8, 1994
- Preceded by: Harold Spaet
- Succeeded by: Sally Heyman
- Constituency: 101st district (1982–1992); 105th district (1992–1994)

Personal details
- Born: December 7, 1947 (age 78) New York City, U.S.
- Party: Democratic
- Spouse: Diane Ambers
- Children: 2
- Education: University of Miami (B.A.)
- Occupation: Lobbyist, insurance salesman

Michael I. Abrams (born December 7, 1947) is an American politician. He served as a Democratic member for the 101st and 105th district of the Florida House of Representatives.

Abrams was born in New York. Abrams moved to Florida for which he attended at the University of Miami, graduating in 1965. In 1983, Abrams was elected for the 101st district of the Florida House of Representatives. In 1992 Abrams was elected for the 105th district, serving until 1994. Abrams was chairman of Florida's health care committee.
