= Sherman Winn =

American politician

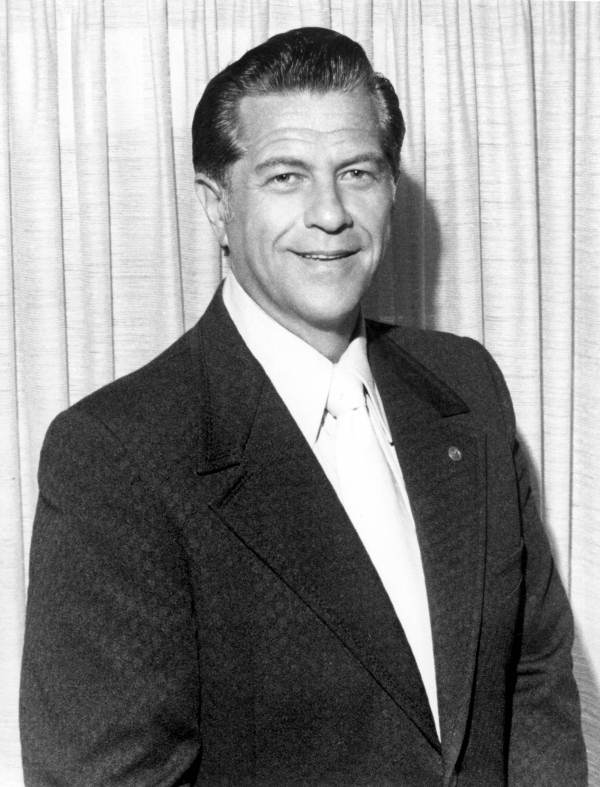
- Winn in 1972

Member of the Florida House of Representatives from the 105th district
- In office November 3, 1970 – November 7, 1972
- Preceded by: Bob Graham
- Succeeded by: Joe Lang Kershaw

Member of the Florida Senate from the 34th district
- In office 1972–1981
- Succeeded by: Joe Gersten

Member of the Metro-Dade County Commission from the 4th district
- In office 1984–1993
- Preceded by: Ruth Shack
- Succeeded by: Gwen Margolis

Personal details
- Born: February 18, 1923 Brooklyn, New York, U.S.
- Died: June 2, 2008 (aged 85)
- Party: Democratic
- Spouse: Roselyn Winn
- Children: 4

Sherman S. Winn (February 18, 1923 – June 2, 2008) was an American politician. He served as a Democratic member for the 34th district of the Florida Senate. and for the 105th district of the Florida House of Representatives.

Winn was born in Brooklyn, New York, and served in the United States Army during World War II. By 1956 he had settled in Miami-Dade County, Florida. In 1965 Winn was elected to the North Miami city council, also becoming mayor as he had received the most votes. He was re-elected as mayor in 1967. In 1970, he was elected for the 105th district of the Florida House of Representatives, succeeding Bob Graham. In 1972 he was elected as member of the Florida Senate for the 34th district, being re-elected in 1974 and 1978, and serving until his resignation in 1981. He was vice-chairman of the Senate Commerce Committee for eight years, chairman of the Senate Executive Business Committee 1978 to 1980, and president pro tempore of the Senate 1977 to 1978.

In 1982 Winn was elected to the Miami-Dade County Commission, on which be served for eleven years. In 1983 he was honored by the Florida State Legislature, having a bridge at Sunny Isles Beach named after him.

Winn died in June 2009 of a brain tumor, at the age of 85.
