= Eli Sagan =

American businessman

Eli Sagan (March 3, 1927 – January 4, 2015) was an American businessman who headed one of the nation's largest manufacturers of outerwear for young women, an autodidact in cultural sociology who wrote several widely reviewed books on the subject and a political activist who served on the national finance committee for George McGovern's 1972 presidential campaign, a role that earned him a spot on Richard Nixon's Enemies List in 1973.

== Early life and business career ==
Sagan was born on March 3, 1927, in Summit, New Jersey to manufacturer George Sagan and homemaker Esther (née Gooen) Sagan. He earned a Bachelor of Arts degree in economics from Harvard University in 1948, magna cum laude, and was elected to Phi Beta Kappa society.

After college, he joined the family business, New York Girl Coat Co., which manufactured outerwear for young women, largely for sale to department stores. The company, founded by Sagan's father George in 1916, was an early innovator in adapting assembly line techniques to the process of manufacturing coats—techniques which would become industry standards—and was one of the first in the field to build its own facilities to manufacture its clothing. By 1966, when the company celebrated its 50th anniversary, Sagan was its president. That year, The New York Times reported that the company produced 10% of all girl's coats sold in the United States, accounting for $12 million in annual sales, with Sagan targeting a 20% market share in the upcoming years.

== Political advocacy ==
A co-founder of the political group Fund for New Priorities in America in 1969, Sagan also served as director and treasurer of the Council for a Livable World, an advocacy organization dedicated to eliminating the US arsenal of nuclear weapons. He helped to coordinate the "Senators for Peace and New Priorities" rally held at New York City's Madison Square Garden in 1970, and two years later was behind a rally for McGovern also held at the Garden.

A supporter of progressive candidates, he was a fundraiser for Eugene McCarthy in McCarthy's 1968 bid for the Democratic Party nomination for President. Four years later Sagan supported George McGovern, serving on the Democratic presidential candidate's national finance committee and being chosen as a delegate from New Jersey for the McGovern ticket at the 1972 Democratic National Convention. His support of McGovern and other left-leaning political causes earned him a spot among the 490 people listed on Richard Nixon's 1973 Enemies List; he was included as part of the "List of McGovern Staff Members and campaign contributors". He told a newspaper that he felt "honored" to be included in two versions of the list, but "was disappointed that I wasn't on the last one". He called his inclusion on the list as his "proudest life moment".

== Writings and teaching ==
His extensive readings in anthropology and psychology led Sagan to write on the subject of cultural anthropology. He authored several books on the subject, including 1985's At the Dawn of Tyranny: The Origins of Individualism, Political Oppression and the State, the 1991 work The Honey and the Hemlock: Democracy and Paranoia in Ancient Athens and Modern America, and his 2001 book Citizens & Cannibals: The French Revolution, the Struggle for Modernity and the Origins of Ideological Terror. he also wrote a book on the history of cannibalism in the early seventies.

In a review of At the Dawn of Tyranny in The New York Times, reviewer Andrew Bard Schmookler called the book "flawed in structure and... assumptions", but acknowledged Sagan's writing as "rich in substance and humane in spirit" and credited him for making a "serious contribution" to the field of evolutionary sociology.

Sagan was a visiting professor in sociology and women's studies at the University of California, Berkeley, The New School and Brandeis University. During the early seventies he also taught one course a week in anthropology at The New England Conservatory of Music in Boston.

== Personal ==
Sagan married Frimi Giller of Chelsea, Massachusetts on August 7, 1949, at Boston's Copley-Plaza Hotel. They had four children: Miriam, Rachel, Susannah and Daniel. In his longtime hometown of Englewood, New Jersey, he was active in the chamber music program at the Art Center of Northern New Jersey, participating for nearly two decades. During the early 1970s, he served on the boards of the Elisabeth Morrow School and the Englewood School for Boys (later the Dwight-Englewood School). Sagan moved to Dedham, Massachusetts in 2011, and died there on January 4, 2015.
