= Harold Featherstone =

American judge and politician

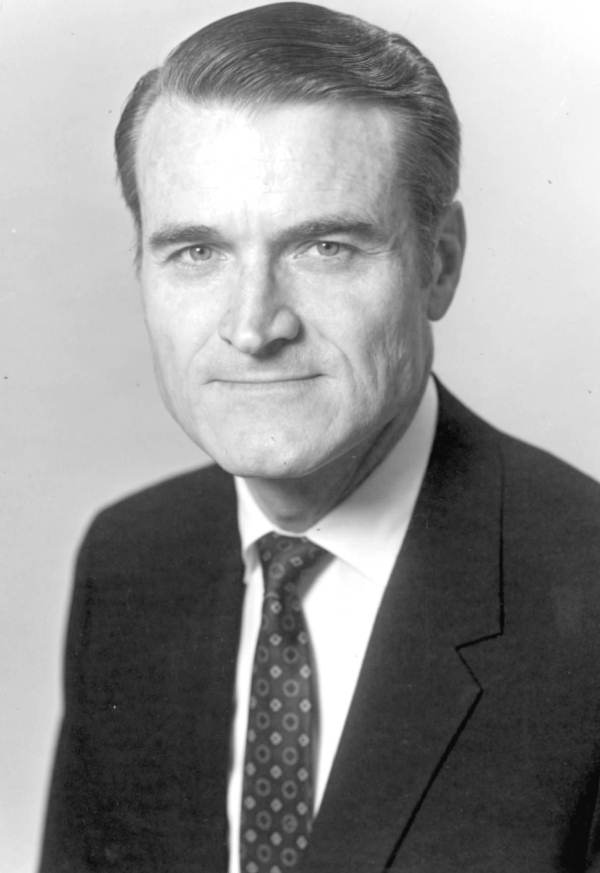
- Featherstone in 1970

Member of the Florida House of Representatives from the 101st district
- In office 1967 – November 7, 1972
- Preceded by: District established
- Succeeded by: Paul B. Steinberg

Personal details
- Born: Harold Gordon Featherstone; February 28, 1923 Miami, Florida, U.S.
- Died: July 19, 2003 (aged 80) Melbourne, Florida, U.S.
- Party: Democratic
- Spouse(s): Jacqueline Louise Happillon (m. 1946, divorced) Deljean Dworak (m. 1950)
- Education: Biarritz American University; University of Miami
- Occupation: Judge

Harold Gordon Featherstone (February 28, 1923 – July 19, 2003) was an American judge and politician. He served as a Democratic member for the 101st district of the Florida House of Representatives from 1967 to 1972.

Featherstone was born in Miami, Florida. He attended Biarritz American University in France and the University of Miami, where he earned a Bachelor of Laws degree in 1951 and a Juris Doctor degree in 1967. Featherstone served in the United States Army Air Forces during World War II and the Korean War, and was awarded the Bronze Star Medal.

In 1967, Featherstone became the first member for the newly established 101st district of the Florida House of Representatives. He was succeeded by Paul B. Steinberg in 1972. He also served as a judge of the Miami-Dade County Circuit Court from 1972 to 1992, and was a member of the Florida Judicial Qualifications Commission.

Featherstone died in July 2003 in Melbourne, Florida, at the age of 80.
