= Susan Welch =

American political scientist (1943–2022)

Susan Welch (3 October 1943 – 28 March 2022) was an American political scientist who served as the Dean of the College of the Liberal Arts at Pennsylvania State University from 1991 to 2019, the longest serving dean in Penn State's history.

Born in Illinois and educated at the University of Illinois, Welch was on the faculty at the University of Nebraska–Lincoln from 1970 to 1991 where she was the Carl A. Happold Professor of Political Science. At Penn State, she was Professor of Political Science. She is well known for her work on women and politics, African Americans and politics, urban politics, and other topics. She is widely cited by her peers and widely held in libraries.
