= Paul B. Steinberg =

American politician

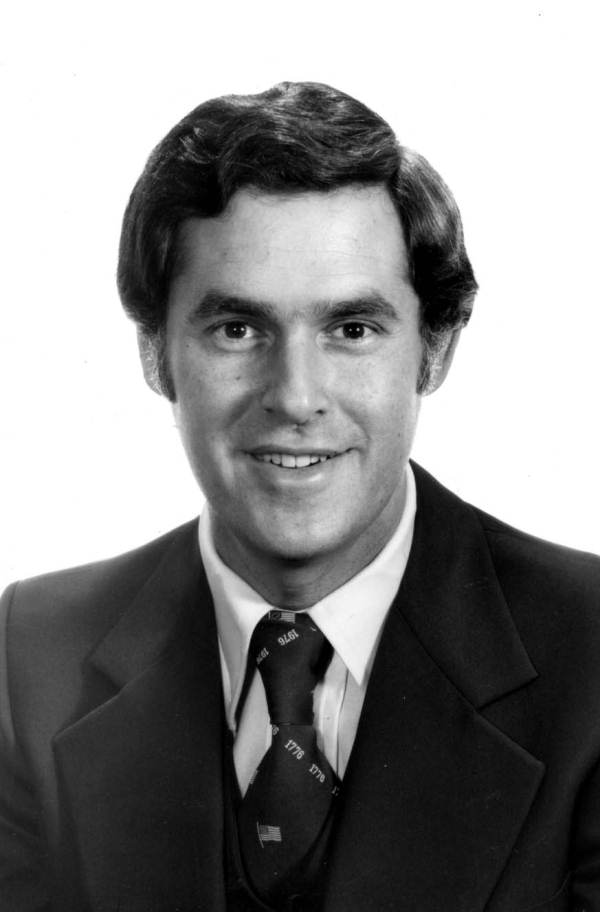
- Steinberg, c. 1976–1978

Member of the Florida Senate from the 36th district
- In office November 7, 1978 – November 2, 1982
- Preceded by: George Firestone
- Succeeded by: Carrie Meek

Member of the Florida House of Representatives from the 101st district
- In office November 7, 1972 – November 7, 1978
- Preceded by: Harold Featherstone
- Succeeded by: Harold Spaet

Personal details
- Born: Paul Burton Steinberg; March 21, 1940 (age 86) Brooklyn, New York, U.S.
- Party: Democratic
- Spouse: Sandra J. Schwartz
- Children: 3
- Education: University of Miami (BBA); Stetson University (JD)

Military service
- Branch/service: United States Coast Guard
- Years of service: 1963 (active); 1964-1971 (reserve)
- Rank: Petty officer third class

Paul Burton Steinberg (born March 21, 1940) is an American attorney and former politician from the state of Florida.

== Early life, education, & military service ==
Steinberg was born in Brooklyn, New York. He came to Florida in 1957. He graduated from the University of Miami (BBA, 1961) and from Stetson School of Law (JD, 1963). He was an editor of the business school newspaper and served on the debate team. He served in the United States Coast Guard from 1963 to 1971. He served on active duty in 1963 and was in the reserves from 1964 to 1971. He reached the rank of Petty officer third class.

== Political career ==
He is the former chairman of the Miami Beach Beautification Committee. He served in the Florida House of Representatives from 1972 to 1978, as a Democrat, representing the 101st district. He served in the Florida Senate from 1978 to 1982 representing the 36th district.

From 1981 to 1982 he served as chairman of the Florida Motion Picture & T.V. Council.

== Legal career ==
He has practiced law with Steinberg & Associates since the firm's founding in 1969.
