= Gwen Margolis =

American politician (1934–2020)

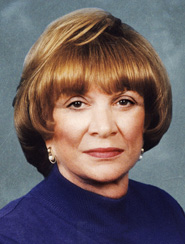

Member of the Florida Senate from the 35th district
- In office November 2, 2010 – November 8, 2016
- Preceded by: Dan Gelber
- Succeeded by: Oscar Braynon
- In office November 5, 2002 – November 4, 2008
- Preceded by: Tom Rossin
- Succeeded by: Dan Gelber

Member of the Miami-Dade County Commission from the 4th district
- In office 1993–2002
- Preceded by: Sherman Winn
- Succeeded by: Sally Heyman

President of the Florida Senate
- In office November 20, 1990 – November 3, 1992
- Preceded by: Robert B. Crawford
- Succeeded by: Ander Crenshaw

Member of the Florida Senate from the 37th district
- In office November 4, 1980 – November 3, 1992
- Preceded by: Ken Myers
- Succeeded by: Mario Díaz-Balart

Member of the Florida House of Representatives from the 102nd district
- In office November 5, 1974 – November 4, 1980
- Preceded by: Ted Cohen
- Succeeded by: Michael Friedman

Personal details
- Born: Gwen Liedman; October 4, 1934 Philadelphia, Pennsylvania, US
- Died: June 9, 2020 (aged 85) Aventura, Florida, US
- Party: Democratic
- Spouse: Allan B. Margolis (div.)
- Children: 4

Gwen Margolis (née Liedman; October 4, 1934 – June 9, 2020) was a Democratic politician from Florida. She served three different times in the Florida Senate: from 1980 to 1992, 2002 to 2008, and 2010 to 2016. She served as Senate President for the 1990–92 term, becoming the first woman president and the last president to preside over a majority-Democratic chamber. Prior to her time in the Senate, she serve three terms in the Florida House of Representatives, from 1974 to 1980.

Margolis left state government in 1992, losing to E. Clay Shaw, Jr. in an unsuccessful bid for the United States Congress. Thereafter she became a County Commissioner for Dade (now Miami-Dade) County until she returned to the State Senate.

She was previously married to Allan Margolis.

She was a candidate for the position of Miami-Dade County Property Appraiser in 2008. She received the most votes in the November 4, 2008, general election. However, due to not having received at least fifty percent of the vote plus one, she had to face the next highest vote-getter, Pedro Garcia Jr., in a December 16, 2008 run-off. She filed a lawsuit to avoid the run-off election, arguing that because the appraiser's office is a constitutional position, no runoff should be required under state law. Her lawsuit was unable to prevent the runoff election, which she lost to Garcia.

Margolis again ran for the Florida Senate in 2010. She received the nomination of the Democratic Party on August 24, 2010, defeating Kevin Burns in the primary.

Following a redistricting lawsuit that radically changed the makeup of her senate district, Margolis announced in June 2016 that she was ending her reelection campaign. She retired from politics after the 2016 election.

Gwen Margolis died at the age of 85 on June 9, 2020.
