= Sally Heyman =

American politician

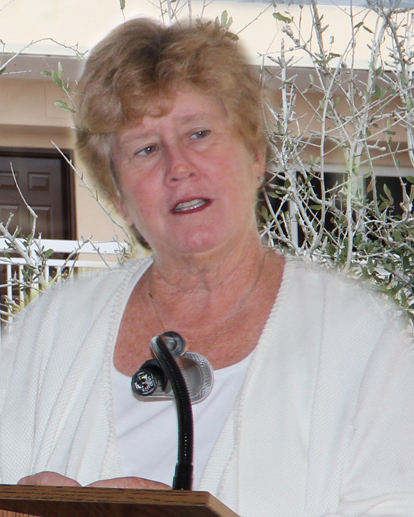

Member of the Miami-Dade County Commission from the 4th district
- In office September 2002 – 2022
- Preceded by: Gwen Margolis
- Succeeded by: Micky Steinberg

Member of the Florida House of Representatives from the 105th district
- In office November 8, 1994 – 2002
- Preceded by: Mike Abrams
- Succeeded by: Kenneth Gottlieb

Personal details
- Born: November 10, 1954 (age 71)
- Party: Democratic
- Education: University of Florida (BA); Nova Southeastern University (MA); University of Miami (JD)

Sally A. Heyman is an American politician, businesswoman, and attorney who served as a commissioner of Miami-Dade County, Florida for District 4. Heyman was first elected in September 2002 after serving in the Florida House of Representatives for eight years.

== Education ==
She received her bachelor's degree from the University of Florida, a master's degree from Nova Southeastern University, and a Juris Doctor degree from the University of Miami.

== Career ==
Her first role in public office was as a Council Member for the City of North Miami Beach, where she served for seven years, and worked for the City of Miami and North Miami Beach Police Department. Heyman is currently a member of South Florida Regional Planning Council (SFRPC); Board Member Florida Association of Counties (FAC); FAC Vice Chair Large Urban Counties (LUC); Board Member National Association of Counties (NACo); NACo Steering Committee for Large Urban Counties Caucus (LUCC); NACo Public Safety and Justice Committee; NACo Vice-Chair - Emergency Management and Domestic Security Committee; member National Homeland Security Consortium. Heyman works on responsible growth management, workforce housing initiatives, transportation alternatives, public safety and animal services. Heyman is a Crime Prevention Specialist for two police departments and an adjunct professor of Criminal Justice at Florida International University (FIU). Her involvement in the Jewish community is also extensive as she maintains membership in ORT, Hillel of North Dade, MAR-JCC, the Greater Miami Jewish Federation and Jewish Community Services of South Florida.

As a state representative she served four consecutive terms, where the nature of her sponsored legislation was public safety. She passed bills into law addressing domestic violence, juvenile justice, boat safety, increased penalties for elder and child abuse, debt collection courts, end of life directives, agriculture theft, outreach for high-risk pregnant women, eminent domain and adoption-foster care.

Heyman is also the owner of her own gourmet coffee food truck, Coffee Brake.

While Commission seats are officially non-partisan, Heyman is an affiliated member of the Democratic Party
