= Flamingo/Lummus =

Coordinates: 25.782851°N 80.136423°W

- Neighborhood of Miami Beach
- Interactive map of Flamingo/Lummus
- Country: United States
- State: Florida
- County: Miami-Dade County
- City: Miami Beach

Government
  - Miami Beach Mayor: Steven Meiner
  - Miami-Dade County Commissioner: Eileen Higgins (D)
  - House of Representatives: Fabián Basabe (R)
  - State Senate: Ileana Garcia (R)
  - U.S. House: Frederica S. Wilson (D)

Area
  - Total: 0.751 sq mi (1.95 km^{2})
  - Water: 0.0 sq mi (0 km^{2})

Population (2010)
  - Total: 14,662
- Time zone: UTC-05 (EST)
- ZIP Code: 33139, 33140
- Area codes: 305, 786

Flamingo/Lummus (often called either Flamingo or Lummus) is an urban neighborhood of South Beach in the city of Miami Beach, Florida, United States. Named for Flamingo Park and Lummus Park, the two large parks within its confines, it is located in the middle of South Beach, and is its largest residential neighborhood. It is roughly bound by Lincoln Road to the north, 5th Street to the south, Biscayne Bay and Alton Road to the west, and Ocean Drive and Lummus Park to the east.
