= Irene Marie =

- Born: August 22, 1950 (age 75); Miami Beach, Florida, United States
- Occupations: entrepreneur, modeling agency president
- Website: Irene Marie official website

Irene Marie (born August 22, 1950 in Miami Beach, Florida) is an American businesswoman and former fashion model. Founder of the eponymous South Beach model agency Irene Marie Models. Marie and her agency were the subject of the MTV series 8th & Ocean. Marie is referred to as The Grand Dame of Modeling. Marie is the former chair of the Dade Film and Print Advisory Board and has served as a modeling industry expert on CNN.

== City Models ==
In 1974, Irene met her future husband, Patrick Marie, while on vacation in Miami Beach. Soon after, Patrick introduced Irene to his cousin; the owner of Paris-based City Models. City Models was seeking to place a group of their models in Miami, and requested Irene's assistance in finding a suitable agency. City Models was dissatisfied with the regional scope of the agencies in Miami, and proposed to Marie to open a branch of City Models in Florida. In 1980, City Models Florida opened in Ft. Lauderdale as one of the first exclusive model and talent agency in South Florida.

== Irene Marie Models ==
For the first time a Florida agency was taking an international perspective to the fashion industry. Marie's contacts in Europe allowed her to persuade foreign photographers and designers to produce their campaigns in Florida, from Palm Beach to the art deco oasis of Miami Beach. In 1983 the name of the agency was changed to Irene Marie Models and by 1988 had outgrown its location in Ft. Lauderdale.

In 1989 Marie decided to move her agency South to South Beach to meet her client's demand for the golden light, inexpensive hotels, and undiscovered scenery. She moved her agency to the former Sunray Apartments (made famous by the chainsaw scene in the movie Scarface (1983 film)) located at 728 Ocean Drive.

The agency continued to grow during the early 1990s with the discovery and development of talent such as Niki Taylor (L'Oréal, Elle, Vogue, CoverGirl), Amber Smith (Wonder Bra, Sports Illustrated), Michael Ostheim (Esprit, Armani), and Britt Bradford (Versace).

In 1993 Marie opened agency branches in Atlanta, Tampa and was the first Florida based modeling agency to ever open in New York. During this period Irene represented the top models in the business including Marcus Schenkenberg, Kimora Lee, Beverly Peele and Anna Nicole Smith. In 1997 Marie became a founding mentor for the Women of Tomorrow Mentor and Scholarship Program, an organization established by Jennifer Valoppi aimed at motivating at-risk young women to live up to their full potential through mentoring.

Over the next decade, Marie continued to discover and develop talent including Cindy Taylor, Galen Gering and David Fumero. In 2006, Marie along with MTV launched the hit reality television series 8th & Ocean which chronicled the lives of 10 models and their relationship with Marie and her staff. In 2007 Marie received the key to the City of Miami Beach in recognition of her cultural and commercial contribution to the development of the city. The city's proclamation declared July 11 Irene Marie Day in the City of Miami Beach. In 2008, Irene's agency was given a similar distinction with December 13 being proclaimed Irene Marie Models Day. The agency closed in 2009 due to the effects of the worldwide economic recession.

== Television appearances ==
Year	Title	Role	Notes
2006	8th & Ocean	Herself	Reality show (10 episodes)
