= South Beach =

Coordinates: 25.781875°N 80.136262°W

- Neighborhood
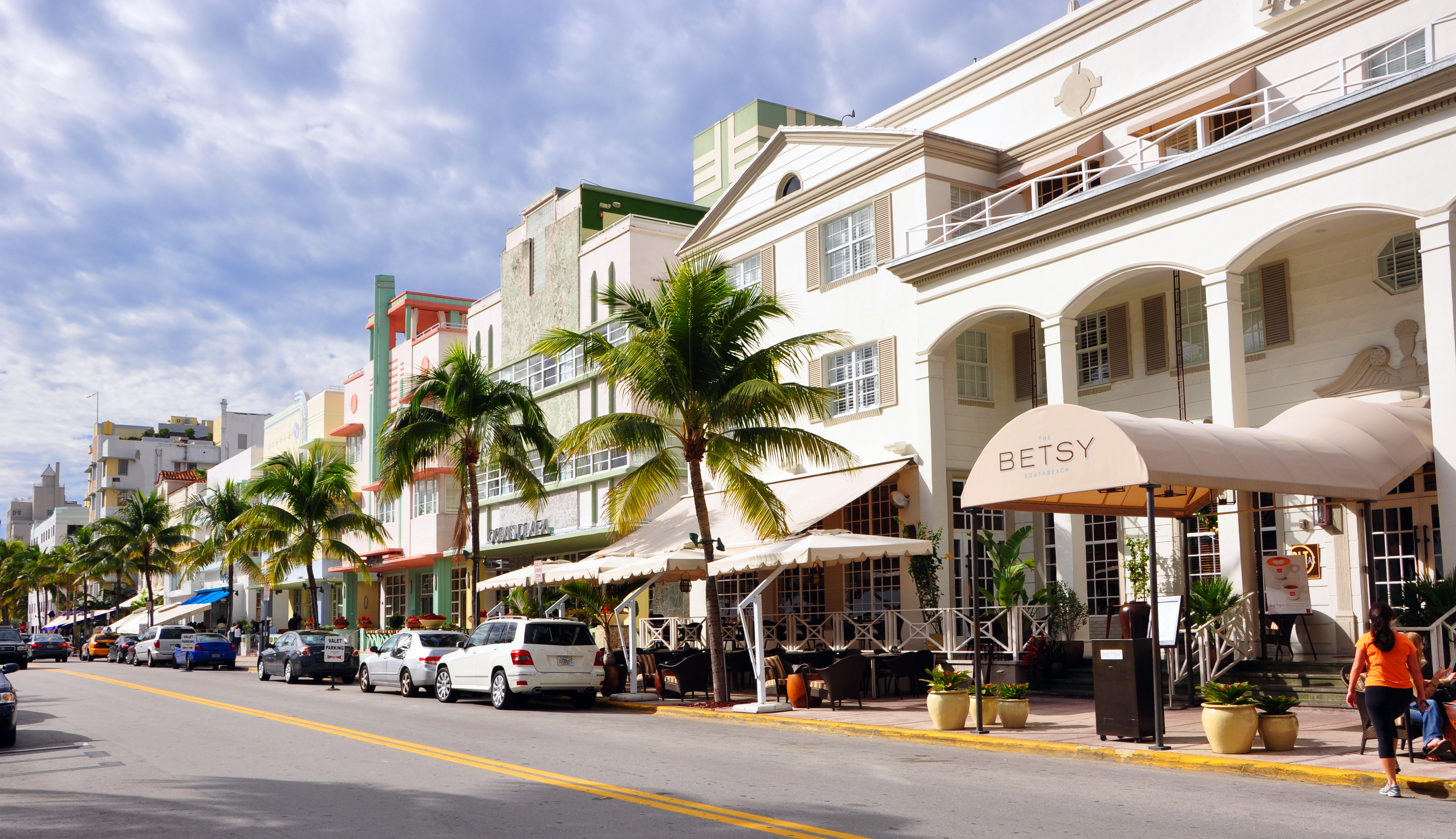
- Ocean Drive on South Beach
- Nickname: SoBe
- Interactive map of South Beach
- Country: United States
- State: Florida
- County: Miami-Dade County
- City: Miami Beach
- Established: 1886
- Subdistricts of South Beach: Neighborhoods list

Government
  - Miami Beach Mayor: Steven Meiner
  - Miami-Dade County Commissioner: Eileen Higgins (D)
  - House of Representatives: Fabián Basabe (R)
  - State Senate: Ileana Garcia (R)
  - U.S. House: Frederica S. Wilson (D)

Population (2010)
  - Total: 39,186
- Time zone: UTC-05 (EST)
- ZIP code: 33139
- Area codes: 305, 786

South Beach, is a neighborhood in Miami Beach, Florida. It is located east of Miami between Biscayne Bay and the Atlantic Ocean. The area encompasses Miami Beach south of Dade Boulevard.

This area was the first section of Miami Beach to be developed, starting in the 1910s, due to the development efforts of Carl G. Fisher, the Lummus Brothers, and John S. Collins, the latter of whose construction of the Collins Bridge provided the first vital land link between mainland Miami and the beaches.

The area has gone through numerous artificial and natural changes over the years, including a booming regional economy, increased tourism, and the 1926 hurricane, which destroyed much of the area. As of 2010, 39,186 people lived in South Beach.

== History ==
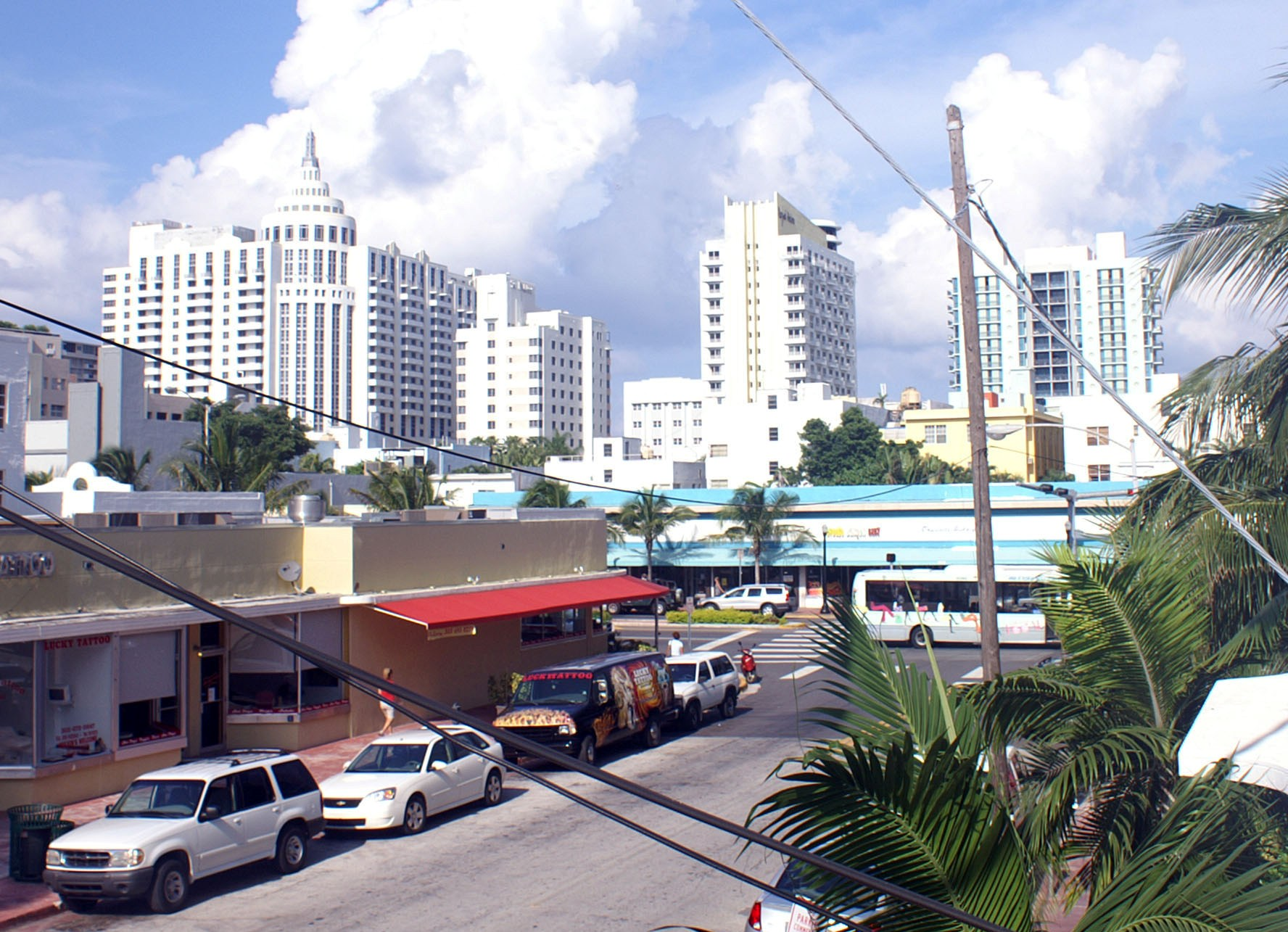
View towards east from 15th Street near Washington Avenue with the Loews, St. Morritz, and the Royal Palm Hotel in the background

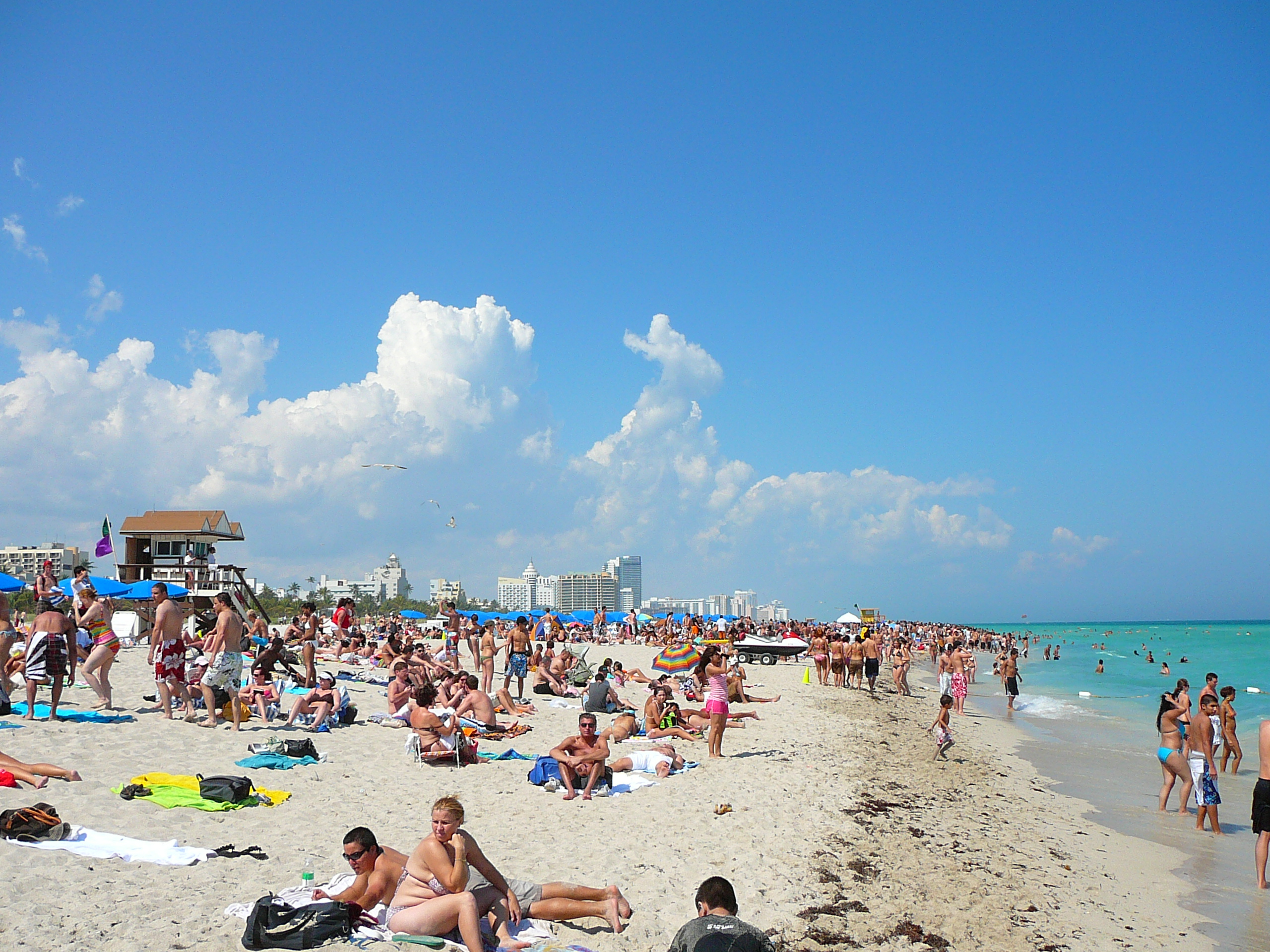
Winter day on South Beach

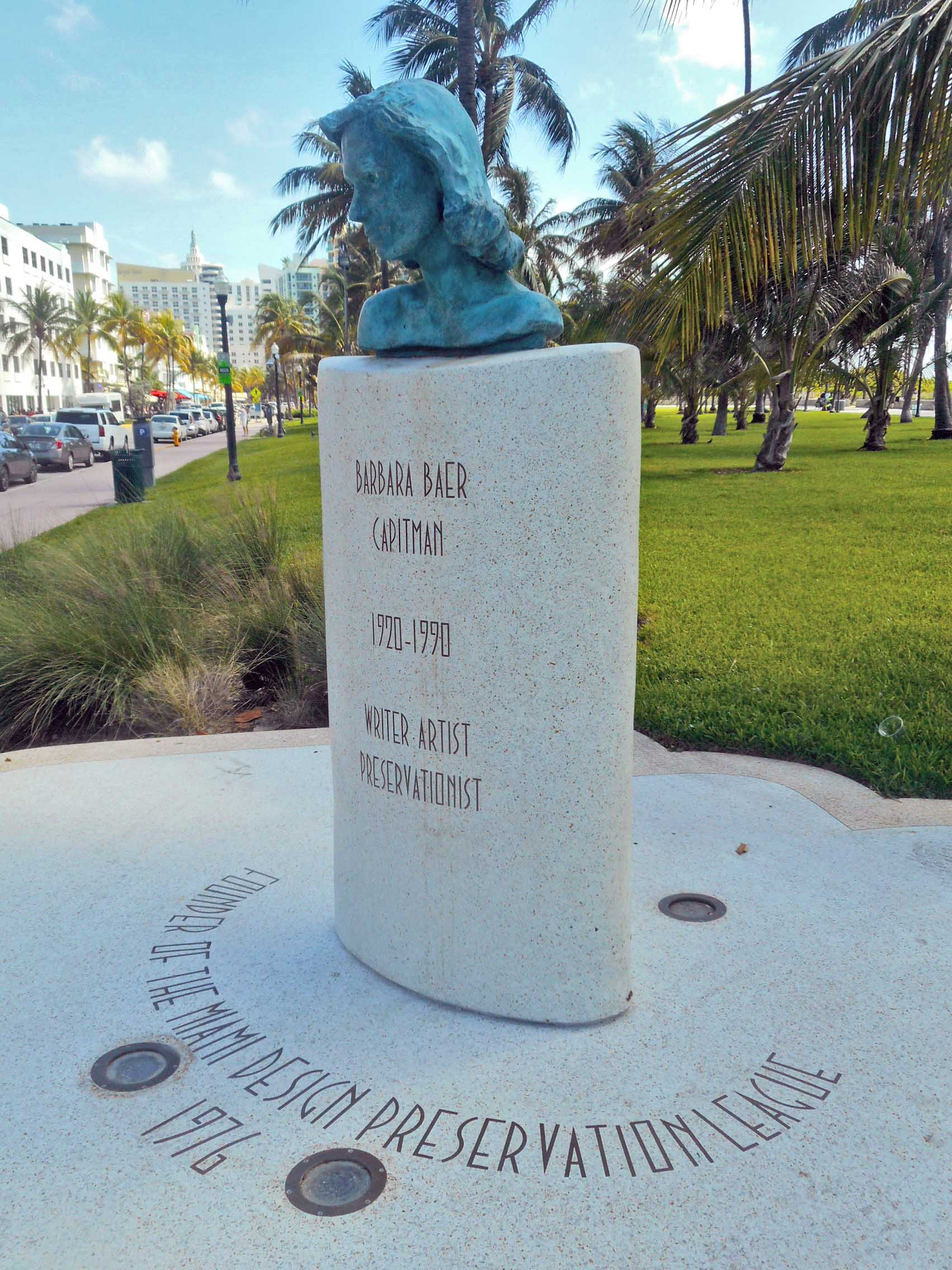
Barbara Capitman Monument in Lummus Park

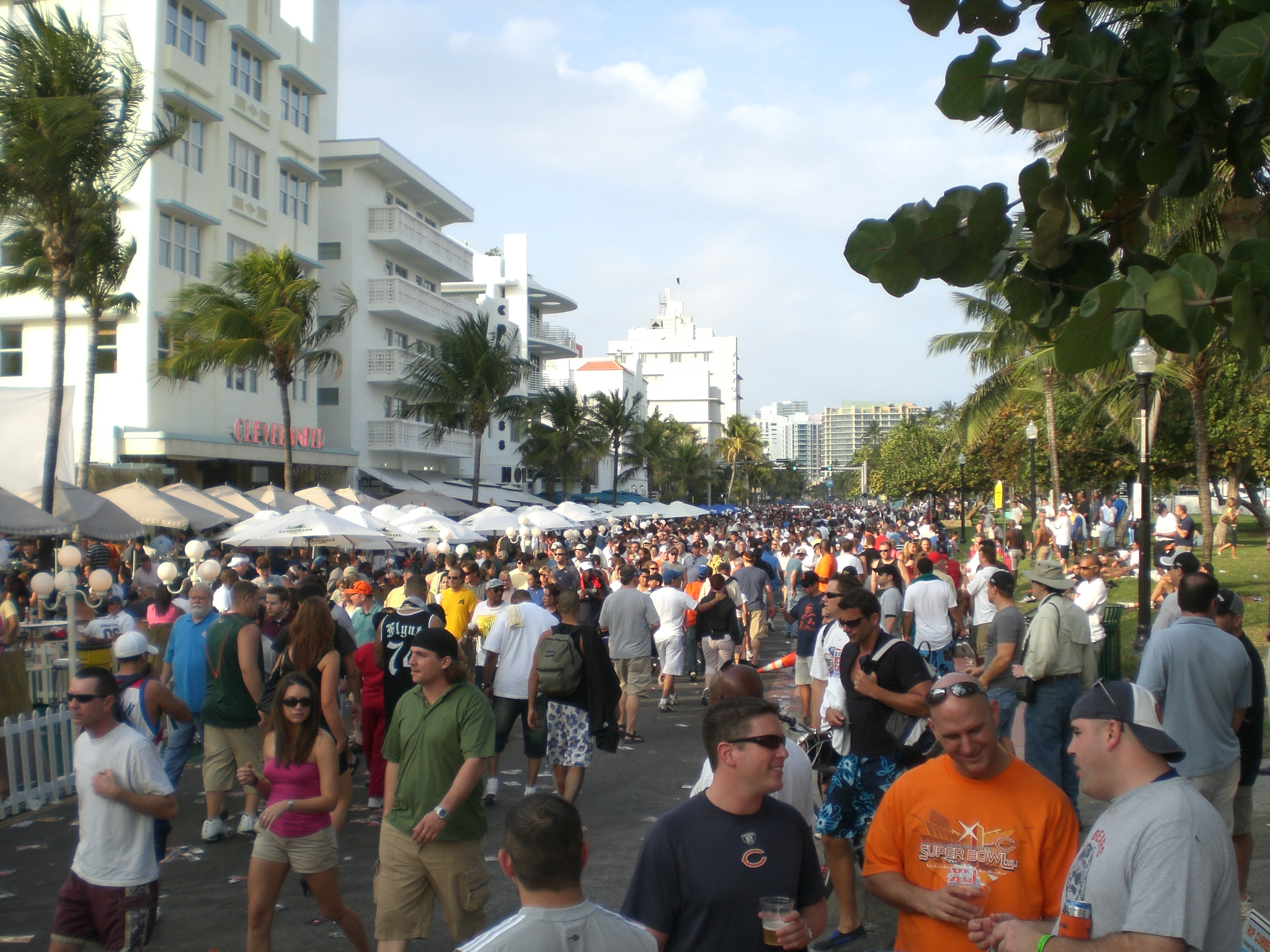
Ocean Drive on Super Bowl XLI weekend 2007

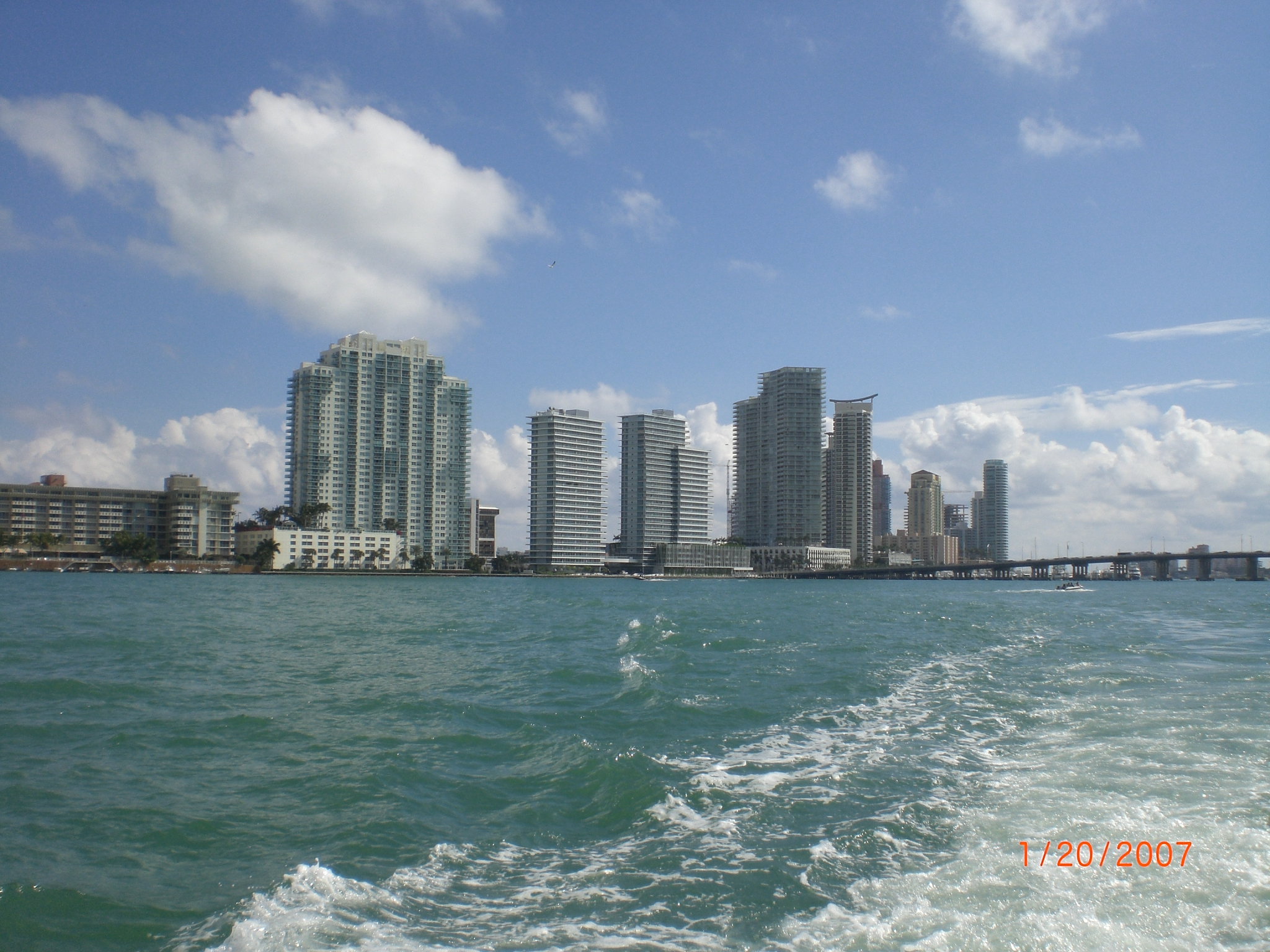
The southern part of the South Beach skyline as seen from Biscayne Bay

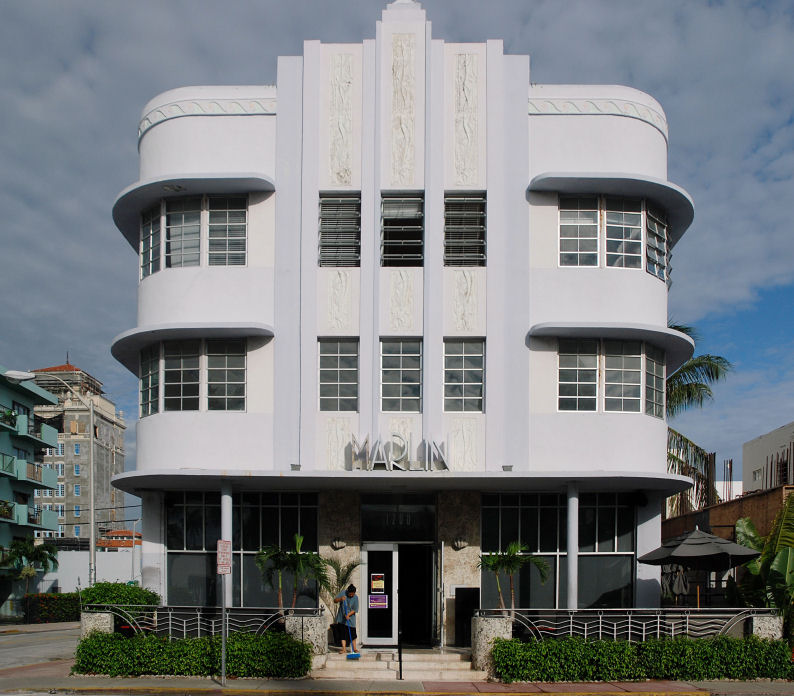
Marlin Hotel on SoBe

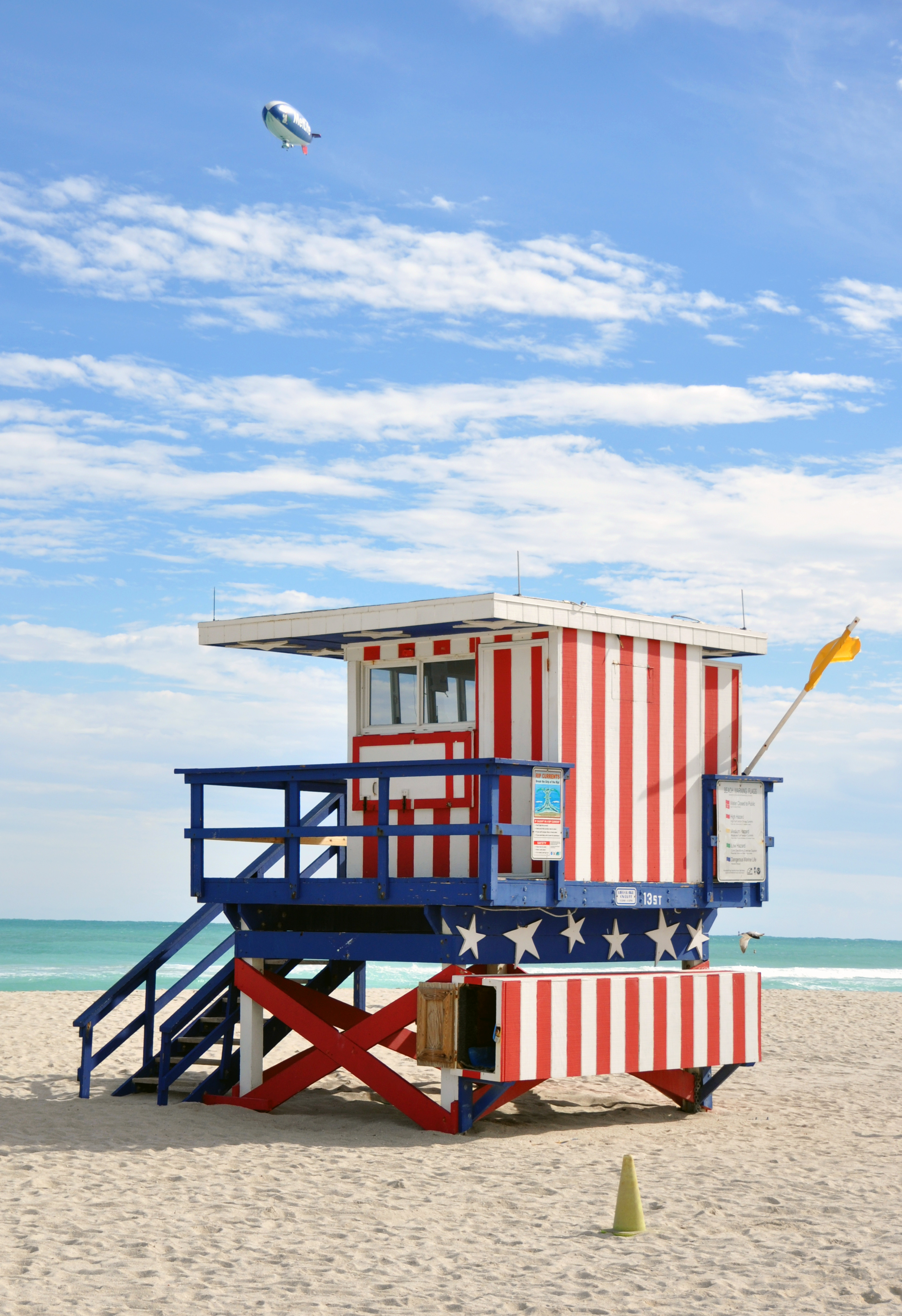
Lifeguard stand at Lummus Park

South Beach started as farmland. In 1870, Henry and Charles Lum purchased 165 acres (67 ha) for coconut farming. Charles Lum built the first house on the beach in 1886. In 1894, the Lum brothers left the island, leaving control of the plantation to John Collins, who came to South Beach two years later to survey the land. He used the land for farming purposes, discovering fresh water and extending his parcel from 14th Street to 67th in 1907.

In 1912, Miami businessmen the Lummus Brothers acquired 400 acres (160 ha) of Collins' land in an effort to build an oceanfront city of modest single family residences. In 1913, Collins started construction of a bridge from Miami to Miami Beach. Although some local residents invested in the bridge, Collins ran short of money before he could complete it.

Carl G. Fisher, a successful entrepreneur who made millions in 1909 after selling a business to Union Carbide, came to the beach in 1913. His vision was to establish South Beach as a successful city independent of Miami. This was the same year that the restaurant Joe's Stone Crab opened. Fisher loaned $50,000 to Collins for his bridge, which was completed in June, 1913. The Collins Bridge was later replaced by the Venetian Causeway.

On March 26, 1915, Collins, Lummus, and Fisher consolidated their efforts and incorporated the Town of Miami Beach. In 1920, the County Causeway (renamed MacArthur Causeway in 1942) was completed. The Lummus brothers sold their oceanfront property, between 6th and 14th Streets, to the city. To this day, this area is known as Lummus Park.

In 1920, the Miami Beach land boom began. South Beach's main streets (5th Street, Alton Road, Collins Avenue, Washington Avenue, and Ocean Drive) were all suitable for automobile traffic. The population was growing in the 1920s, and several millionaires such as Harvey Firestone, J.C. Penney, Harry C. Stutz, Albert Champion, Frank Seiberling, and Rockwell LaGorce built homes on Miami Beach. President Warren G. Harding stayed at the Flamingo Hotel during this time, increasing interest in the area.

Until the mid-1920s, antisemitic covenants were used in South Beach to exclude Jews from living or staying in neighborhoods north of Fifth Street. Explicit and covert policies targeted Jewish property owners, tourists, and tenants through racial covenants in property deeds and hotel policies.

In the 1930s, an architectural revolution came to South Beach, bringing Art Deco, Streamline Moderne, and Nautical Moderne architecture to the Beach. South Beach claims to be the world's largest collection of Streamline Moderne Art Deco architecture. Napier, New Zealand, another notable Art Deco city, is architecturally comparable to Miami Beach as it was rebuilt in the Ziggurat Art Deco style after being destroyed by an earthquake in 1931.

By 1940, the beach had a population of 28,000. After the December 7, 1941 attack on Pearl Harbor, the Army Air Corps took command over Miami Beach. That year, tourism brought almost two million people to South Beach.

In 1964, South Beach became even more famous when Jackie Gleason brought his weekly variety series, The Jackie Gleason Show to the area for taping, a rarity in the industry. Beginning in the mid 1960s and continuing through the 1980s, South Beach was used as a retirement community with most of its ocean-front hotels and apartment buildings filled with elderly people living on small, fixed incomes. This period also saw the introduction of the "cocaine cowboys," drug dealers who used the area as a base for their illicit drug activities. Scarface, released in 1983, typifies this activity. In addition, television show Miami Vice used South Beach as a backdrop for much of its filming. A somewhat recurring theme of early Miami Vice episodes was thugs and drug addicts barricading themselves in run-down or empty buildings. Only minor alterations had to be made for these scenes because some buildings in South Beach were in poor condition at the time.

While many of the unique Art Deco buildings, such as the New Yorker Hotel, were lost to developers in the years before 1980, the area was saved as a cohesive unit by Barbara Baer Capitman and a group of activists who spearheaded the movement to place almost one square mile of South Beach on the National Register of Historic Places. The Miami Beach Architectural District was designated in 1979.

Before the days of Miami Vice, South Beach was considered a very poor area with a very high rate of crime. Today, it is considered one of the wealthiest and most prosperous commercial areas on the beach. Despite this, poverty and crime still exist in some isolated places surrounding the area.

In 2009, Natalie O'Neill of the Miami New Times said, "Until the 1980s, Miami Beach was a peculiar mix of criminals, Cubans, and little old ladies. Then the beautiful people moved in." In the late 1980s, a renaissance began in South Beach, with an influx of fashion industry professionals moving into the area. In 1989, Irene Marie purchased the Sun Ray Apartments (captured in the chainsaw scene in Scarface) located on Ocean Drive and opened Irene Marie Models.

Thomas Kramer is credited with starting the construction boom in South Beach, driving the gentrification of the area. It is now a popular living destination for the wealthy. Condominium units in the upscale high rises sell for millions. There are a number of vocal critics of the developments. The high-rise and high-density buildings are derided as a "concrete jungle". However, even critics concede that the development has changed the area into a pedestrian friendly, low-crime neighborhood.

== Geography ==
South Beach is traversed by numerical streets which run east–west, starting with Biscayne Street, now popularly known as South Pointe Drive, one block south of First Street and the largely pedestrianized Lincoln Road (running parallel between 16th and 17th streets). It also has 13 principal roads and avenues running north–south, which, from the Biscayne Bay side, are Bay Road, West Avenue, Alton Road, Lenox Avenue, Michigan Avenue, Jefferson Avenue, Meridian Avenue, Euclid Avenue, Pennsylvania Avenue, Drexel Avenue, Washington Avenue, Collins Avenue (State Road A1A), and Ocean Drive. There are three smaller avenues (that do not run the entire length of South Beach) in the Collins Park area, named Park, Liberty, and James. Most locals agree that South Beach's northern boundary runs along Dade Boulevard from Lincoln Road on the bay side of the island, and heads east-north-east until it connects with 24th Street, which forms the northern boundary on the ocean side.

=== Neighborhoods and islands ===
- City Center
- Flamingo/Lummus
- SoFi- South of Fifth

== Climate ==
Köppen-Geiger climate classification system classifies its climate as tropical monsoon (Am).

Climate data for South Beach
Month	Jan	Feb	Mar	Apr	May	Jun	Jul	Aug	Sep	Oct	Nov	Dec	Year
Mean daily maximum °F (°C)	75 (24)	75 (24)	79 (26)	82 (28)	84 (29)	88 (31)	90 (32)	90 (32)	88 (31)	84 (29)	81 (27)	77 (25)	83 (28)
Mean daily minimum °F (°C)	59 (15)	61 (16)	64 (18)	68 (20)	72 (22)	75 (24)	75 (24)	77 (25)	75 (24)	72 (22)	66 (19)	61 (16)	69 (20)
Average precipitation inches (mm)	2.4 (62)	2.4 (61)	2.4 (60)	3.0 (77)	5.9 (150)	8.5 (215)	5.5 (140)	6.2 (157)	7.5 (191)	6.5 (166)	3.5 (89)	2.1 (54)	55.9 (1,422)
Average rainy days	7	6	6	5	11	16	16	18	17	14	9	6	131
Mean daily sunshine hours	7	8	9	10	10	9	10	9	9	8	7	7	9
Source: Weather2Travel

Miami Beach mean sea temperature
Jan	Feb	Mar	Apr	May	Jun	Jul	Aug	Sep	Oct	Nov	Dec
24 °C (75 °F)	24 °C (75 °F)	24 °C (75 °F)	25 °C (77 °F)	27 °C (81 °F)	28 °C (82 °F)	29 °C (84 °F)	30 °C (86 °F)	29 °C (84 °F)	28 °C (82 °F)	26 °C (79 °F)	25 °C (77 °F)

== Parks ==
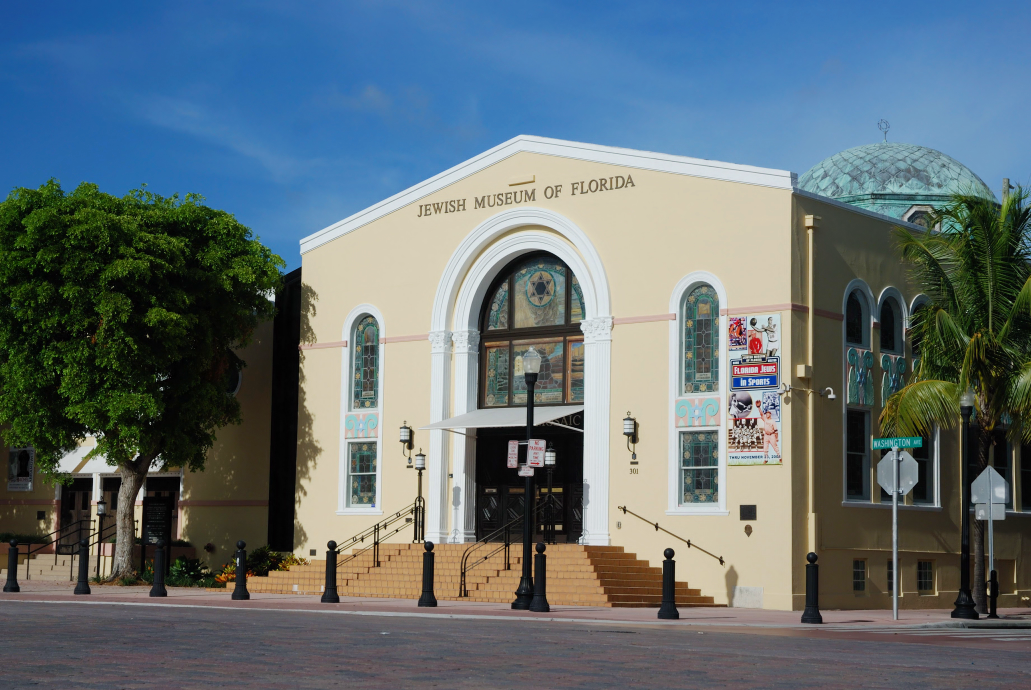
Jewish Museum of Florida on Washington Avenue and 3rd Street

- Collins Park - Collins Ave and 21st St
- Flamingo Park- In between Michigan Ave and Meridian Av from 11th St to Española Way
- Lummus Park - Ocean Drive from 5th St to 14th St
- Maurice Gibb Park - Purdy Ave and Dade Blvd
- Miami Beach Golf Club - Alton Road and W 23rd St
- South Pointe Park - Washington Ave and South Pointe Dr
- Washington Park - Washington Ave and 2nd St

== Transportation ==
South Beach, along with a handful of other neighborhoods in Greater Miami (such as Downtown and Brickell), is one of the areas where a car-free lifestyle is commonplace. Many South Beach residents get around by foot, bicycle, motorcycle, trolley, bus, or taxi as the neighborhood is very urban and pedestrian-friendly. Lincoln Road, Ocean Drive, Washington Avenue, and Collins Avenue are popular shopping, eating, and entertainment streets for pedestrians. Lincoln Road is a pedestrian-only shopping street, and Collins Avenue around 5th Street is mostly upscale retail.

Automobile congestion in the area is frequent, so getting around in South Beach by car can often prove more difficult than simply walking or bicycling. Recently, Miami Beach has begun bicycle initiatives promoting citywide bike parking and bike lanes that have made bicycling much more popular for residents and tourists. The Venetian Causeway, for example, is a popular bicycle commuter route that connects South Beach to Downtown.

Public transportation in South Beach, along with Downtown Miami and Brickell, is heavily used, and is a vital part of South Beach life. Although South Beach has no direct Metrorail stations, numerous Metrobus lines (operated by Miami-Dade Transit), connect to Downtown Miami and Metrorail (e.g., Metrobus lines S and 120). The Miami International Airport can be reached quickly from several bus stops in South Beach via the Airport-Beach Express (Metrobus line 150). That ride costs $2.35 and runs every 30 minutes from 6:00 a.m. to 11:00 p.m. seven days a week.

Various City of Miami Beach-operated trolley routes provide free rides throughout South Beach and connect it to the other major areas of Miami Beach: South Beach Loop travels throughout South Beach, Middle Beach Loop connects South Beach to Mid-Beach's main street (41st Street) via State Road A1A and along 41st Street, and Collins Express connects South Beach to Mid-Beach and North Beach via State Road A1A. Using Collins Express to connect to the North Beach Loop allows free travel from South Beach to several areas of North Beach. All four trolley lines operate from 8 a.m. to midnight on Sunday and from 6 a.m. to midnight the rest of the week.

== Education ==
=== Elementary schools ===
==== Public schools ====
Miami-Dade County Public Schools operates area public schools:

- South Pointe Elementary School
- Feinberg-Fisher Elementary School

==== Private schools ====
- First Presbyterian International Christian School
- Gordon Day School (Jewish)
- Prima Casa Montessori School

=== High schools ===
Miami-Dade County Public Schools operates area public schools:

- Miami Beach Senior High School (public)
- Rabbi Alexander Gross High School (private, Jewish)

=== Colleges and universities ===
- The Florida International University School of Architecture has a sister campus at 420 Lincoln Road in South Beach, with classroom spaces for FIU architecture, art, music and theater graduate students
- Lubavitch Educational Center (private, Jewish)
- Miami Ad School (private)

== Cultural institutions ==
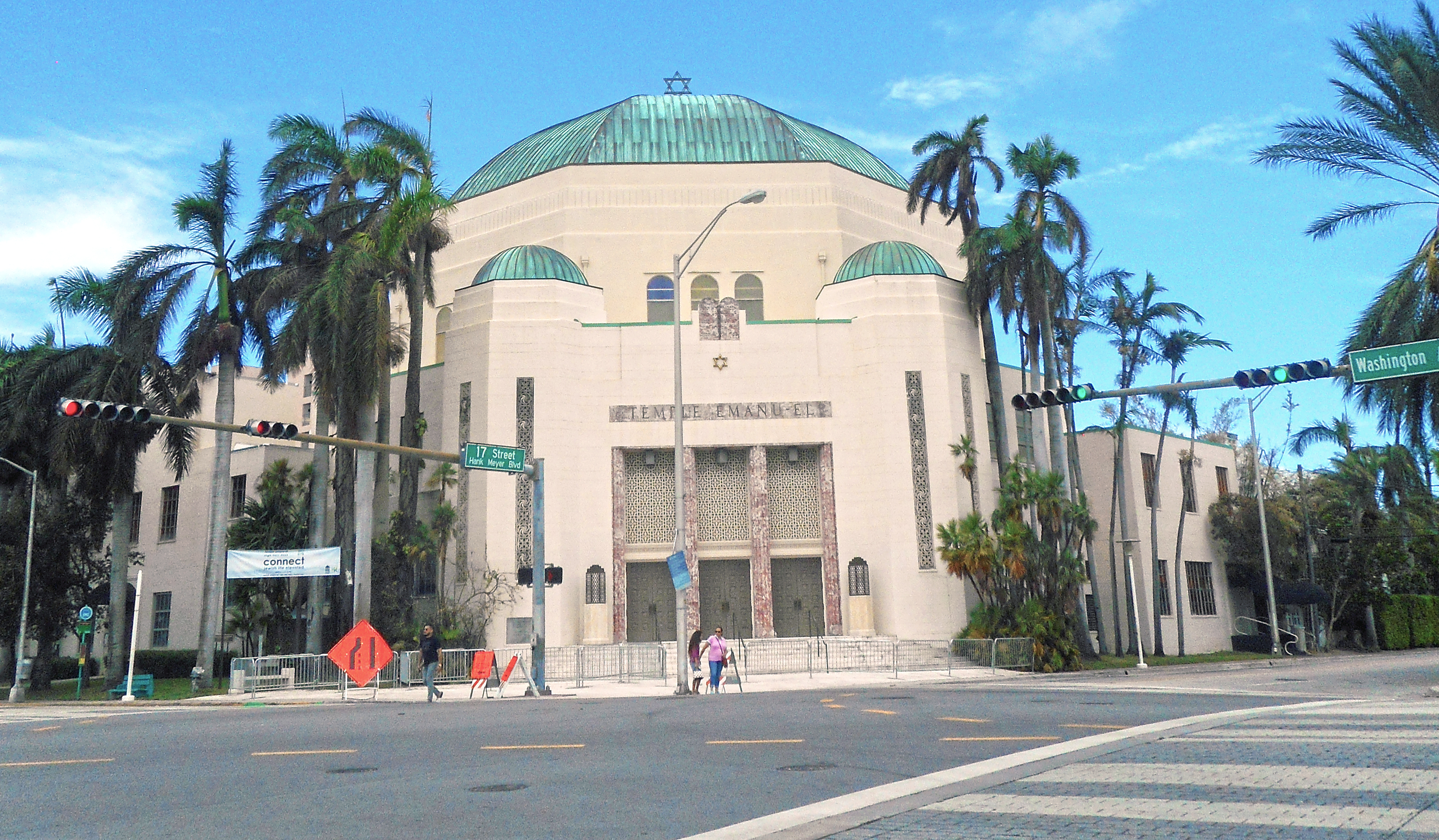
Temple Emanu-El on Washington Avenue

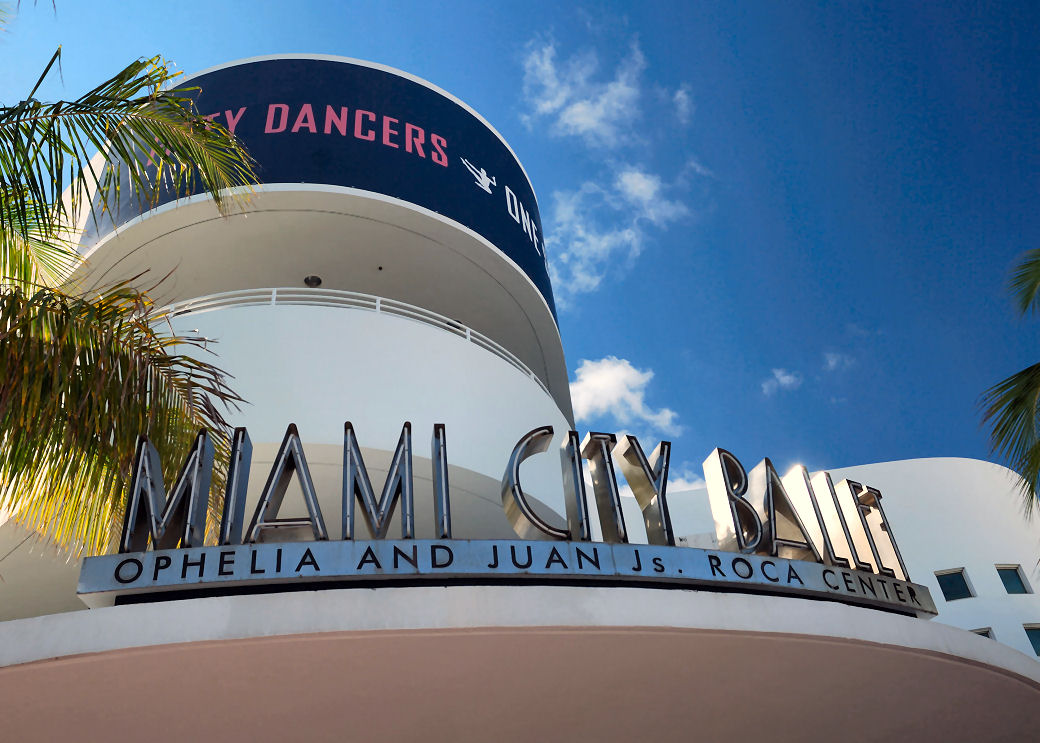
Miami City Ballet building

=== Festivals and events ===
- Art Basel Miami, art exhibition held in December
- Food Network South Beach Wine and Food Festival, held in February
- Mercedes-Benz Fashion Week Miami, held in July
- Miami Fashion Week, held in March
- Miami International Film Festival, held in March
- Miami Marathon, held in January
- Urban Beach Week, Memorial Day weekend, last weekend in May. Urban hip-hop festival since 2001.
- White Party Miami, held in fall
- Winter Music Conference, held in March

=== Libraries ===
- Miami-Dade Public Library
  - Miami Beach Regional Library
  - South Shore Library
- Wolfsonian-FIU Library

=== Museums and historic sites ===
- ArtCenter/South Florida
- Bass Museum
- Miami Holocaust Memorial
- Jewish Museum of Florida
- Wolfsonian-FIU
- World Erotic Art Museum Miami

=== Places of worship ===
- Miami Beach Community Church
- Pentecostal Church of God
- Saint Frances De Sales Church
- Temple Beth Shmuel

=== Theatres and performance arts ===
- Colony Theater
- Lincoln Theatre
- Jackie Gleason Theater
- Miami City Ballet
- New World Center and New World Symphony Orchestra
- SoBe Institute of the Arts (SoBe Arts)

== Commercial and other areas ==
=== Lincoln Road ===
Lincoln Road is an open-air pedestrian mall, considered South Beach's premiere shopping area. While Lincoln Road was one time rather downtrodden, it began a renaissance in the 1980s as an arts and cultural center. It has "an esoteric chic that maintains its trendy appeal." It runs parallel in between 16th Street and 17th Street and spans the Beach in an east–west direction. Lincoln Road was fully accessible to automobile traffic until the 1950s when automobile access was limited from Alton Road to Biscayne Bay on the west end and Washington Avenue to the beach on the east end of Lincoln Road with Lincoln Mall limited to pedestrians stretching from Alton Road to Washington Avenue. Among the late 1990s restaurants on Lincoln Road was one owned by actor Michael Caine, and managed by one of his daughters. The restaurant has since closed. The Miami Beach Preservation Board approved the closure of automobile traffic on the westward part of Lincoln Mall, in favor of the renovation of the SunTrust building including the development of the 1111 Lincoln Road parking garage. Several other parking garages nearby greatly facilitate commerce.

=== Ocean Drive ===
Ocean Drive is the easternmost street in South Beach, and stems from South Pointe Drive to 15th Street, running in a north–south direction. Ocean Drive is responsible for the South Beach aesthetic that most out-of-town visitors expect. It is a popular tourist area. It is also home to several restaurants (including "A Fish Called Avalon"," "Mango's," and the MTV-popularized "Clevelander") and is the site of Gianni Versace's former ocean front mansion.

=== Collins Avenue ===
Collins Avenue runs parallel to Ocean Drive, one block west. It is also State Road A1A. Collins is home to many historic Art Deco hotels, and several nightclubs to the north, including Mynt and Rokbar.

=== Española Way ===
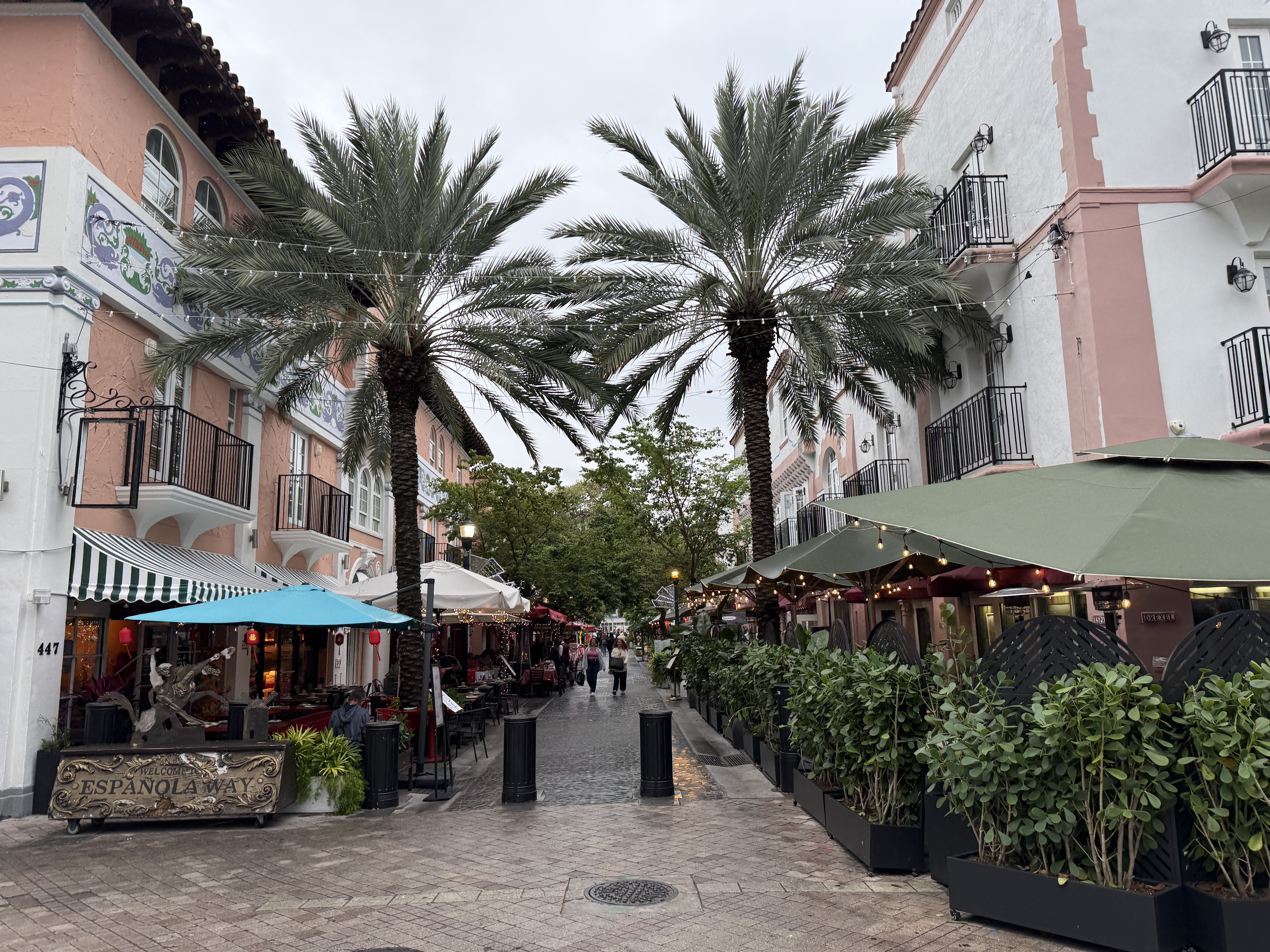
Española Way

Española Way, which runs from Collins Avenue to Pennsylvania Avenue, was conceived by N.B.T. Roney (of Roney Plaza Hotel fame) in 1925 as "The Historic Spanish Village," modeled after Mediterranean villages found in France and Spain. Today it consists of restaurants, bars, art galleries, and shops.

=== Alton Road ===
Alton Road is the main westside north–south street located 1-3 blocks from Biscayne Bay. On the part that traverses South Beach, the road is host to many local businesses, including dry cleaners, small furniture stores, small grocery markets, non-chain restaurants and fast food restaurants. It is mainly residential once it crosses Michigan Avenue north of South Beach.

=== Washington Avenue ===
Washington Avenue is one of the best-known streets in South Beach. Running parallel with Ocean and Collins, Washington is notorious for having some of the world's largest and most popular nightclubs, such as Cameo and Mansion. During "season" the street is jammed with traffic until early in the morning (as late as 6 am) every night of the week. In the 1990s explosion of South Beach as a nightclub venue, its nightclub moguls included Ingrid Casares, whose investors included the singer Madonna. Washington Avenue is also home to countless shops, hotels, and such noted architectural features as Temple Emanu-El.

=== Flamingo/Lummus ===
Flamingo/Lummus, named for the two parks it encompasses, is the largest residential district of South Beach and is home to over 15,000 residents. It is bound by 5th Street to the south, Alton Road to the west, Lincoln Road to the north, and Lummus Park to the east. It contains Flamingo Park, a 36.5-acre (14.8 ha) park with an aquatic center, 17 tennis courts, a baseball stadium, handball and racquetball courts, a softball field, basketball courts, football field, soccer field, running track, playground, walking trails, and a dog park. A diverse working and middle class neighborhood, Flamingo/Lummus contains a wealth of Art Deco and Mediterranean Revival apartment buildings from the 1920s and 1930s.

=== West Avenue Corridor ===
The West Avenue Corridor extends from 5th Street north to 17th Street and is bounded by the east side of Alton Road and Biscayne Bay. Development in the West Avenue Corridor began in the 1920s when three grand hotels were built on the shores of Biscayne Bay: The Flamingo, The Fleetwood and the Floridian. Al Capone and vacationing billionaires from the Golden Age made these hotels their winter hideaway. By the 1950s the hotels fell into ruin and tourists abandoned this side of South Beach for the oceanside.

All three properties, along with the rest of the Corridor, have since evolved into a middle-class, mixed use residential neighborhood. Each passing decade saw the addition of new architectural styles that enhance the diversity and appeal of the neighborhood. Amenities for residents and visitors include shopping, houses of worship, cafes, restaurants, parks and gyms.

The Corridor is home to almost 10,000 residents, over 40 different condominiums, several single family homes and a number of rental buildings. The neighborhood has changed over the years. The recent Census shows the neighborhood to be much younger and more year-round than in years past. It is highly walkable since it is a quiet neighborhood and is close to many amenities - Flamingo Park, Lincoln Road, the ocean, the nightlife of Ocean Drive and Washington Avenue, grocery stores and many restaurants.

== In popular culture ==
=== Media ===
Ocean Drive, founded in 1993 during the South Beach renaissance, documented the neighborhood's emergence as a global center for fashion, modeling, and nightlife and has been called the "Bible of South Florida.

=== Film ===
- South Beach is the setting of the fictional Birdcage drag nightclub in the comedy film The Birdcage (1996).
- Two films starring Will Smith and Martin Lawrence, Bad Boys (1995) and Bad Boys II (2003), were set in and around Miami and South Beach.
- The Last Resort is a 2018 documentary about South Beach in the 1960s, 70s and 80s.

=== Television ===
- South Beach was infamously referenced by NBA superstar LeBron James in his 2010 TV special The Decision when he announced that he was "taking [his] talents to South Beach" by joining the Miami Heat over staying with his hometown Cleveland Cavaliers, which he eventually returned to in 2014. The quote became a punch line for critics.

== See also ==
- Mid-Beach
- North Beach
