= Ocean Drive (South Beach) =

Thoroughfare in Miami Beach, Florida

Coordinates: 25.776755°N 80.131434°W

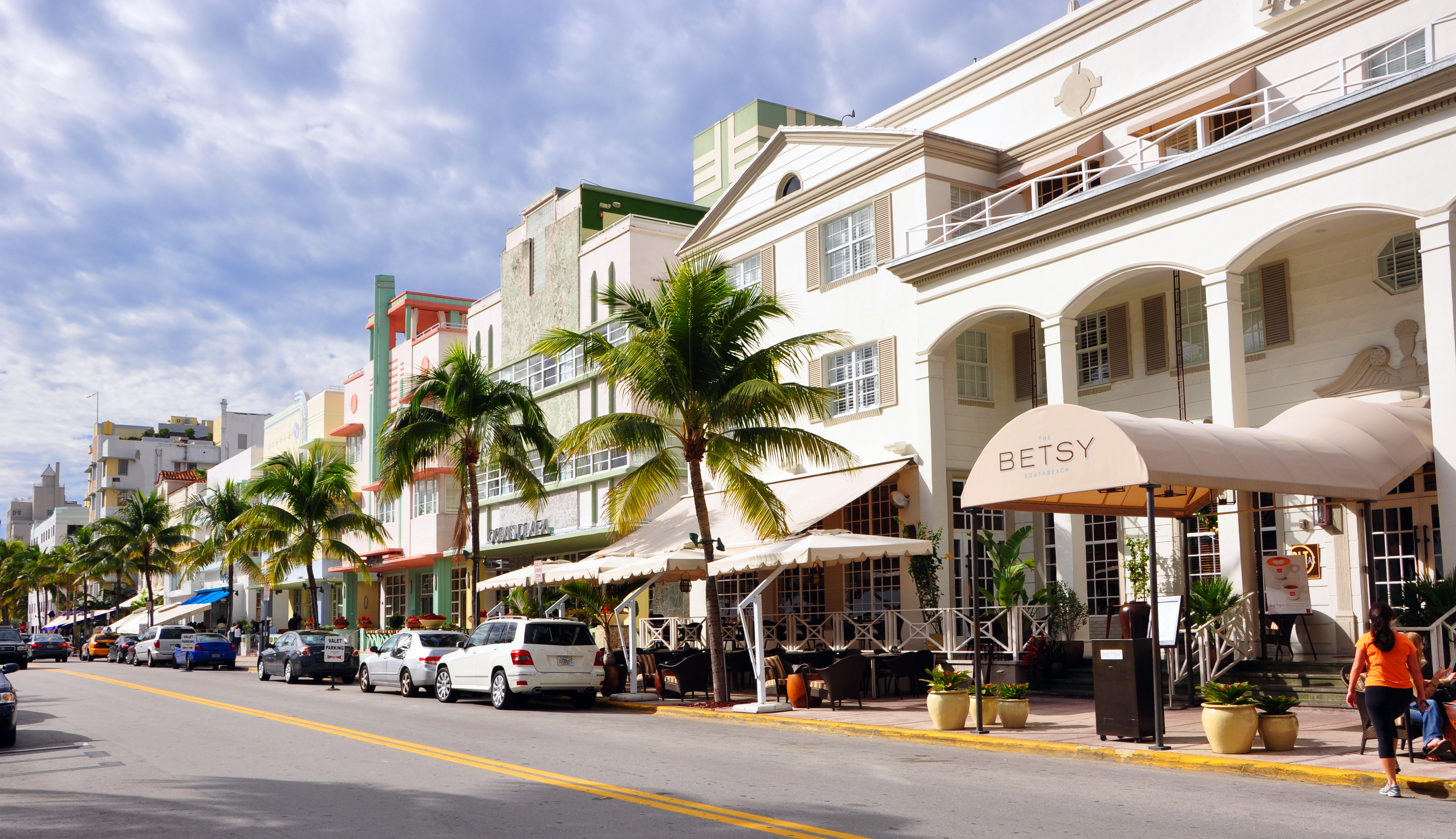
- Ocean Drive in December 2009
- Length: 1.3 mi (2.1 km)
- South end: South Pointe Drive in South Beach, Miami Beach
- North end: 15th Street in South Beach, Miami Beach

Construction
- Inauguration: 1915

Ocean Drive is a major thoroughfare in the South Beach neighborhood of Miami Beach, Florida.

== Route description ==
The road starts at South Pointe just south of 1st Street, near the southernmost end of the main barrier island of Miami Beach, about a quarter mile west of the Atlantic Ocean. Ocean Drive continues north to 15th Street, immediately southeast of Lincoln Road.

== Attractions ==
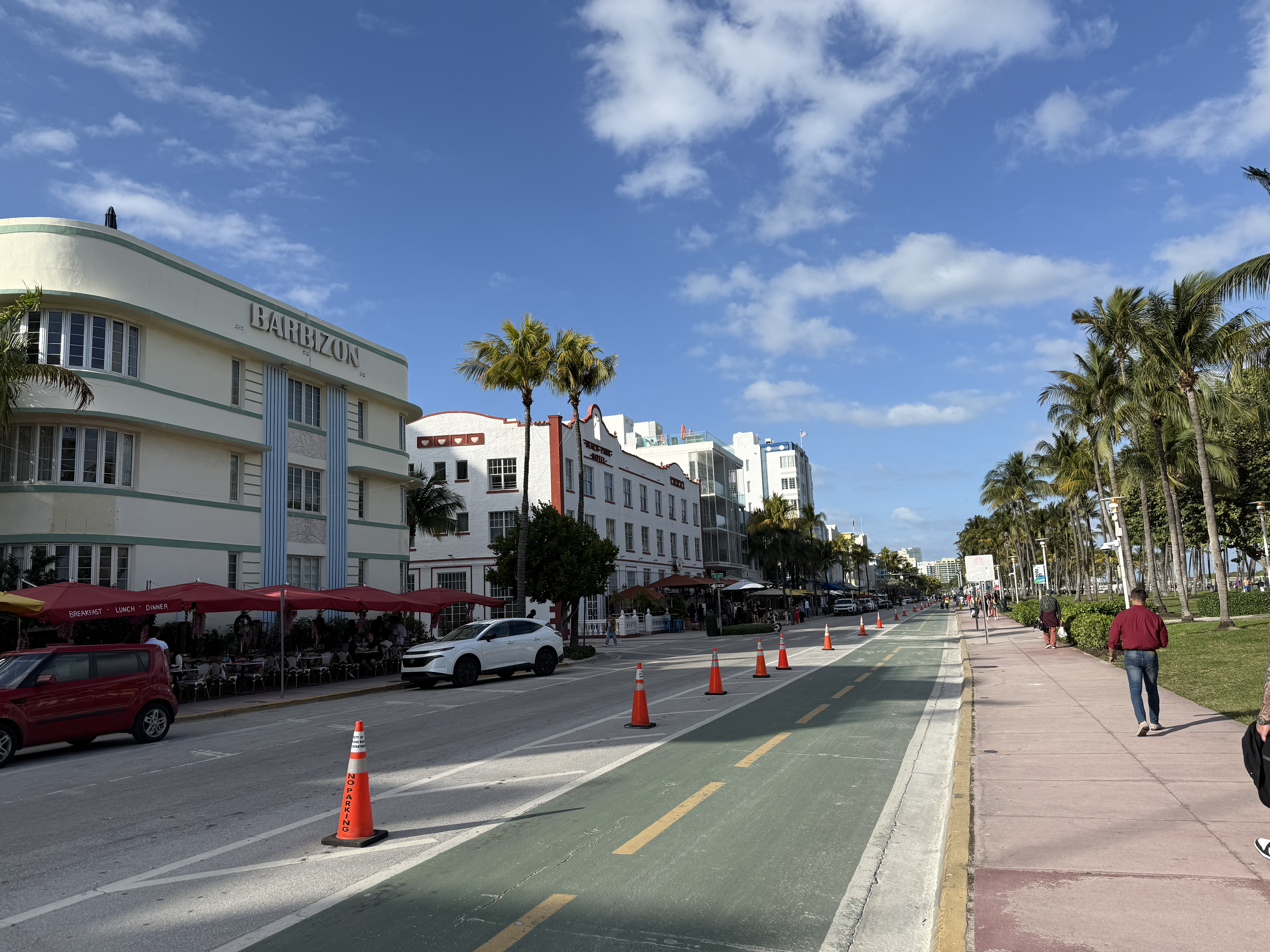
Ocean Drive looking north past 5th Street

Ocean Drive is known mostly for its Art Deco hotels and restaurants/bars, many of which have been prominently featured in numerous movies and media. Among the most popular is the 1939 Colony Hotel, known as the most photographed art deco hotel. Renovated as a boutique hotel, it has been featured in cameos in scores of movies and TV shows, including the series Dexter. Another popular art deco hotel is the Clevelander Hotel; in addition to its standard hotel services, it has an indoor sports lounge, a dance floor and pool area on the ground floor, and a complementary roof-top lounge. The exterior of the Carlyle Hotel was used for the Birdcage drag club in the 1996 comedy The Birdcage.

The Sunray Apartments were featured in the movie Scarface (1983).

Ocean Drive is also the location of the famed Casa Casuarina, the residence of the late Italian fashion designer Gianni Versace. Since his death, the house was sold and adapted for use as a boutique hotel. It is one of the most photographed houses in North America.

== Culture ==
Developed in the 1920s and 1930s, the street is the center of the Miami Art Deco District, which contains about 900 preserved, contributing buildings. It is listed on the National Register of Historic Places. Streamline Moderne evolved from the Art Deco style, and dominates the street.

Ocean Drive magazine is named after the street. British easy-listening duo The Lighthouse Family released a single entitled "Ocean Drive” in 1995 (although this is based on a road in the UK), which reached #11 on the UK Singles Chart.

A street in the 2002 video game Grand Theft Auto: Vice City is based on the street.

== In popular culture ==
=== Television ===
In 2005, Ocean Drive served as the setting for the Brazilian telenovela América, in which the main character (Deborah Secco) worked illegally in a dance club. Several takes were previously filmed on Ocean Dr. itself, but for scenes in several chapters, a street set was built at Estúdios Globo in Rio de Janeiro.

=== Video Games ===
- Grand Theft Auto: Vice City
- Grand Theft Auto VI
- Grand Theft Auto: Vice City Stories
- Driver
- Driver 3

== Restaurants and cabaret ==
One of the most famous restaurants on this strip is Mango's Tropical Café, a Caribbean-inspired restaurant that also has live performances by dancers and singers.

Known for its cabaret and drag queen shows, the Palace Bar is dedicated to the LGBTQ community.

== Cars ==
In July 2020, Miami Beach Commission passed a resolution that banned cars on Ocean Drive in light of the COVID-19 pandemic to create a pedestrian thoroughfare and increased sidewalk seating. Ocean Drive reopened to traffic in January 2022.

== Gallery ==
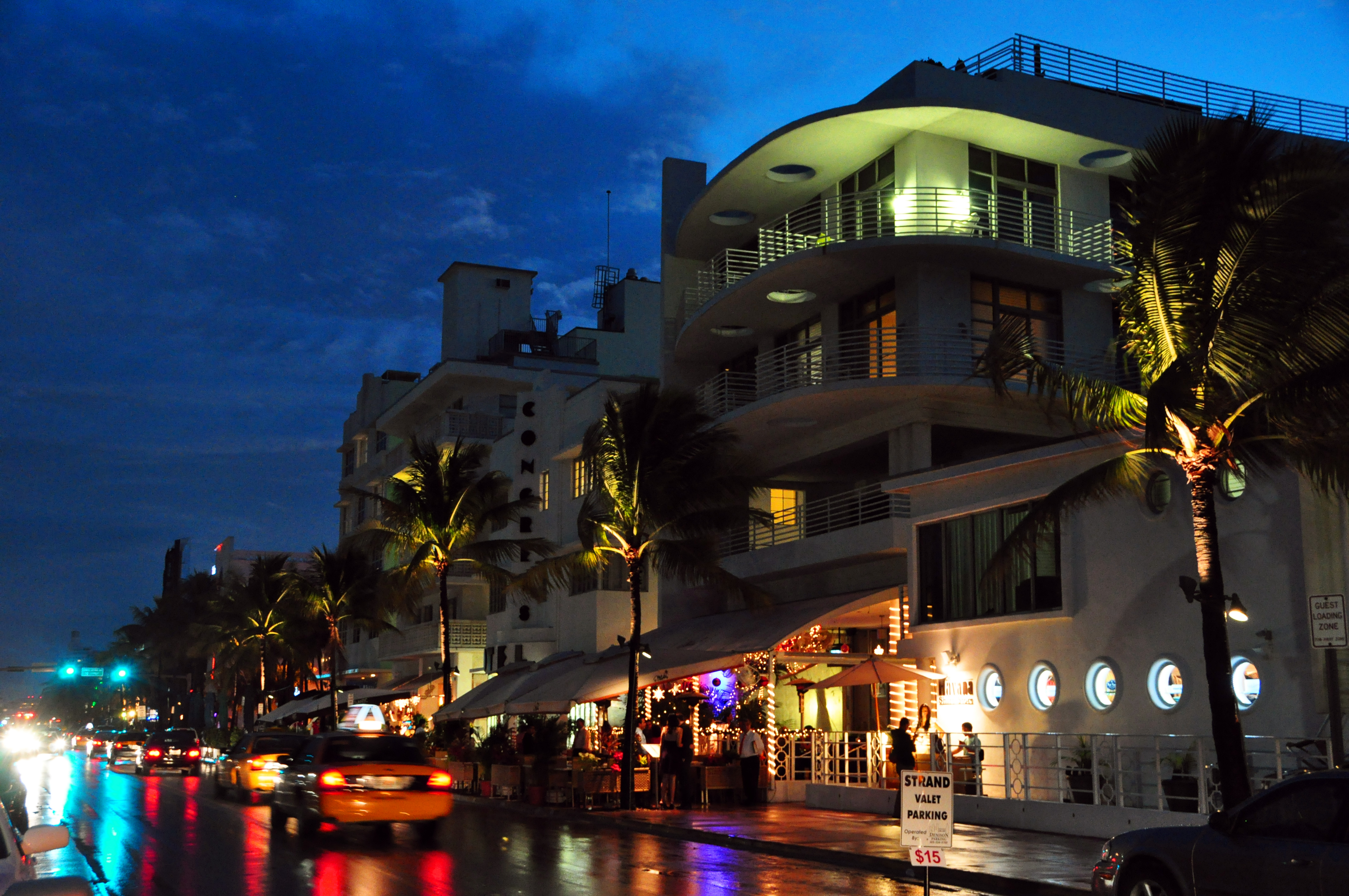
Night view

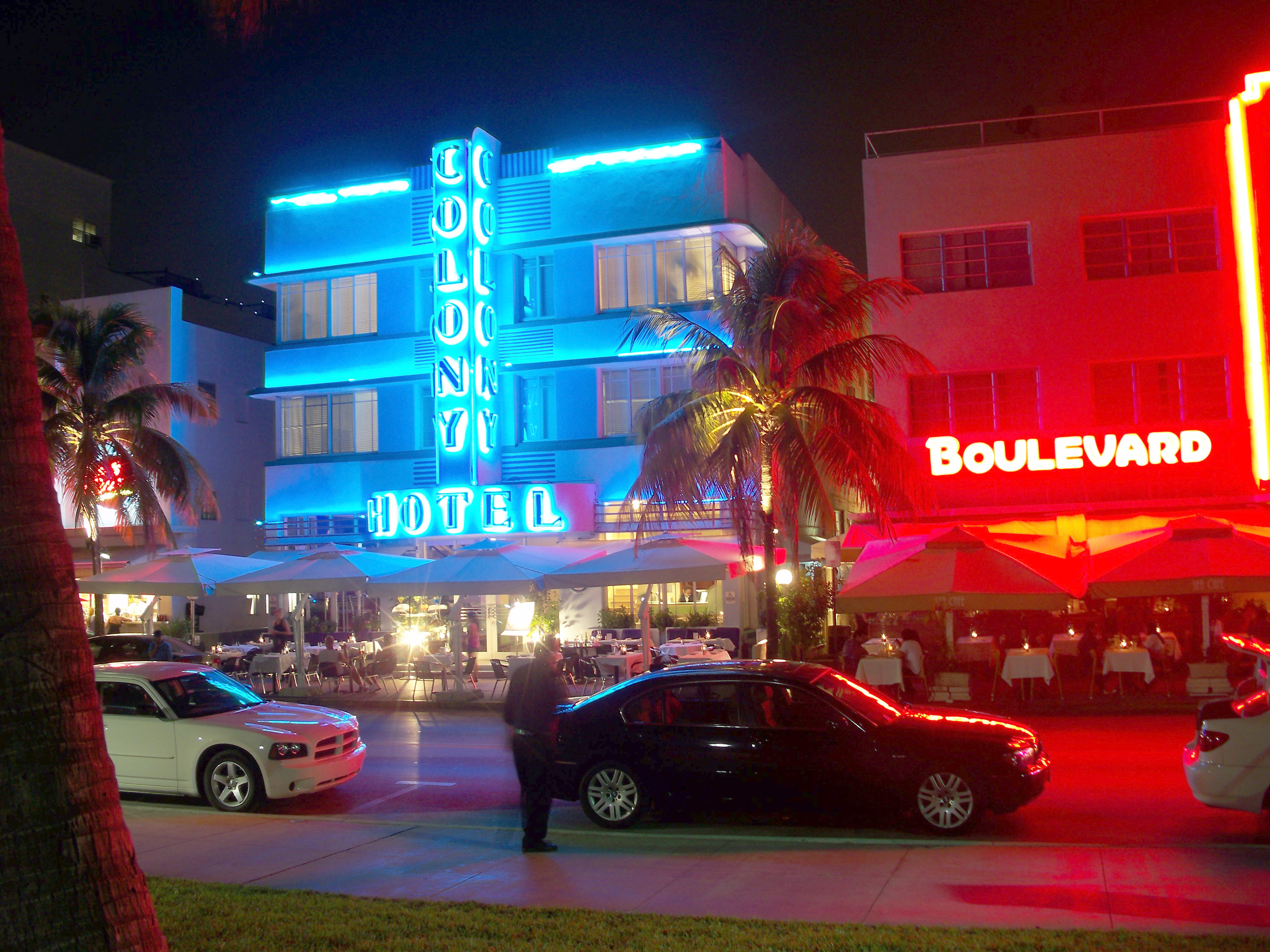
The famous Colony Hotel

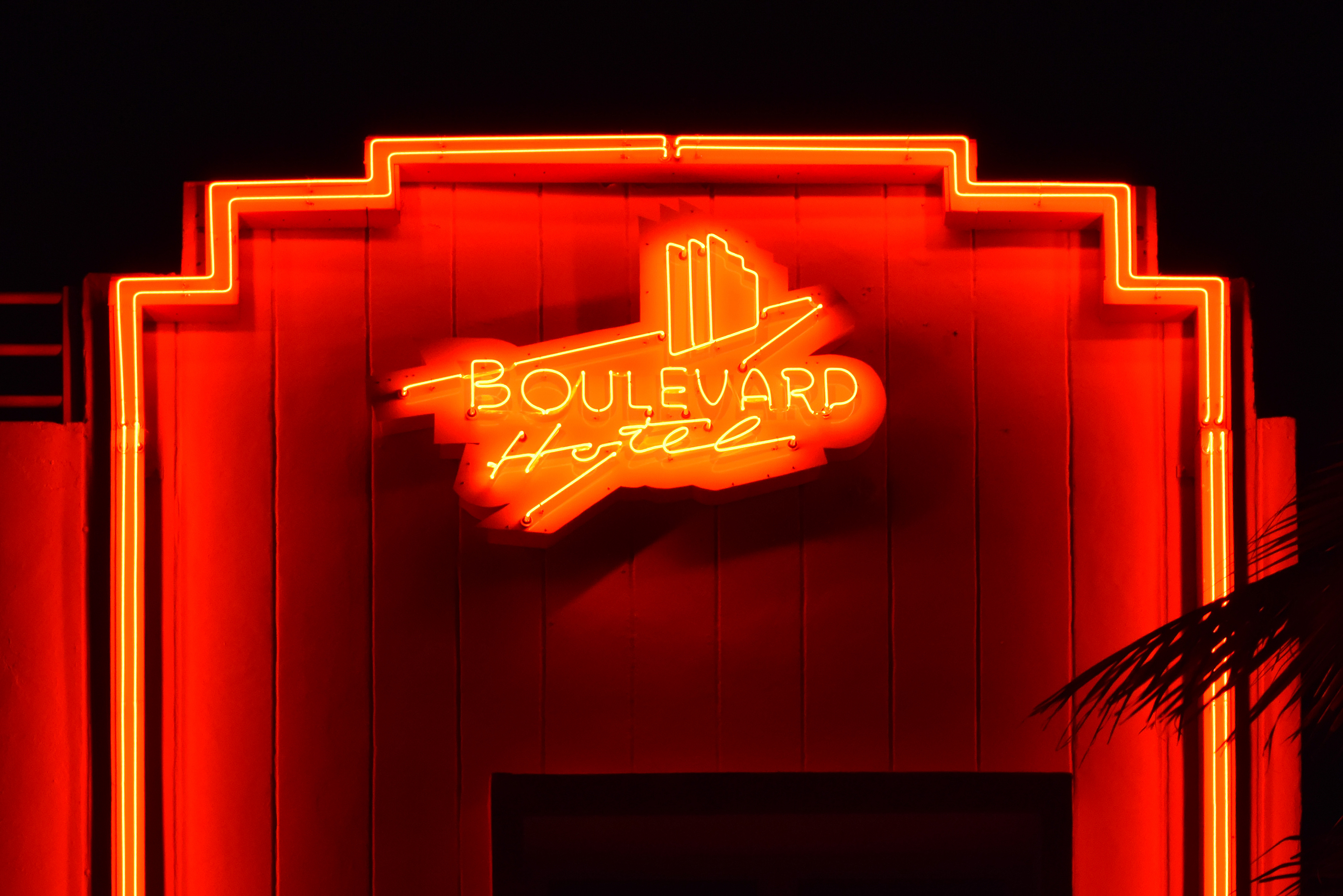
Neon lighting of the Boulevard Hotel

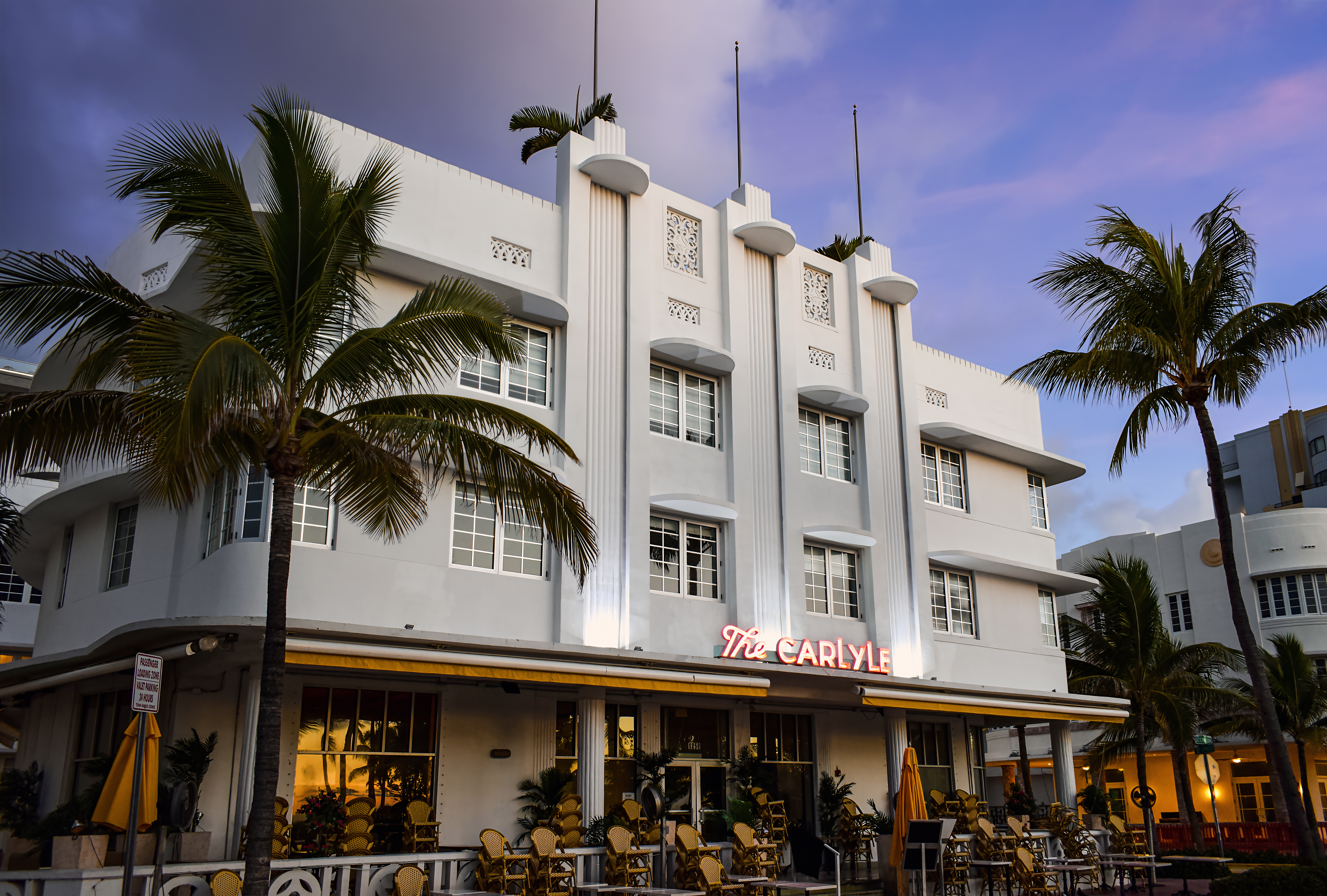
The Carlyle Hotel

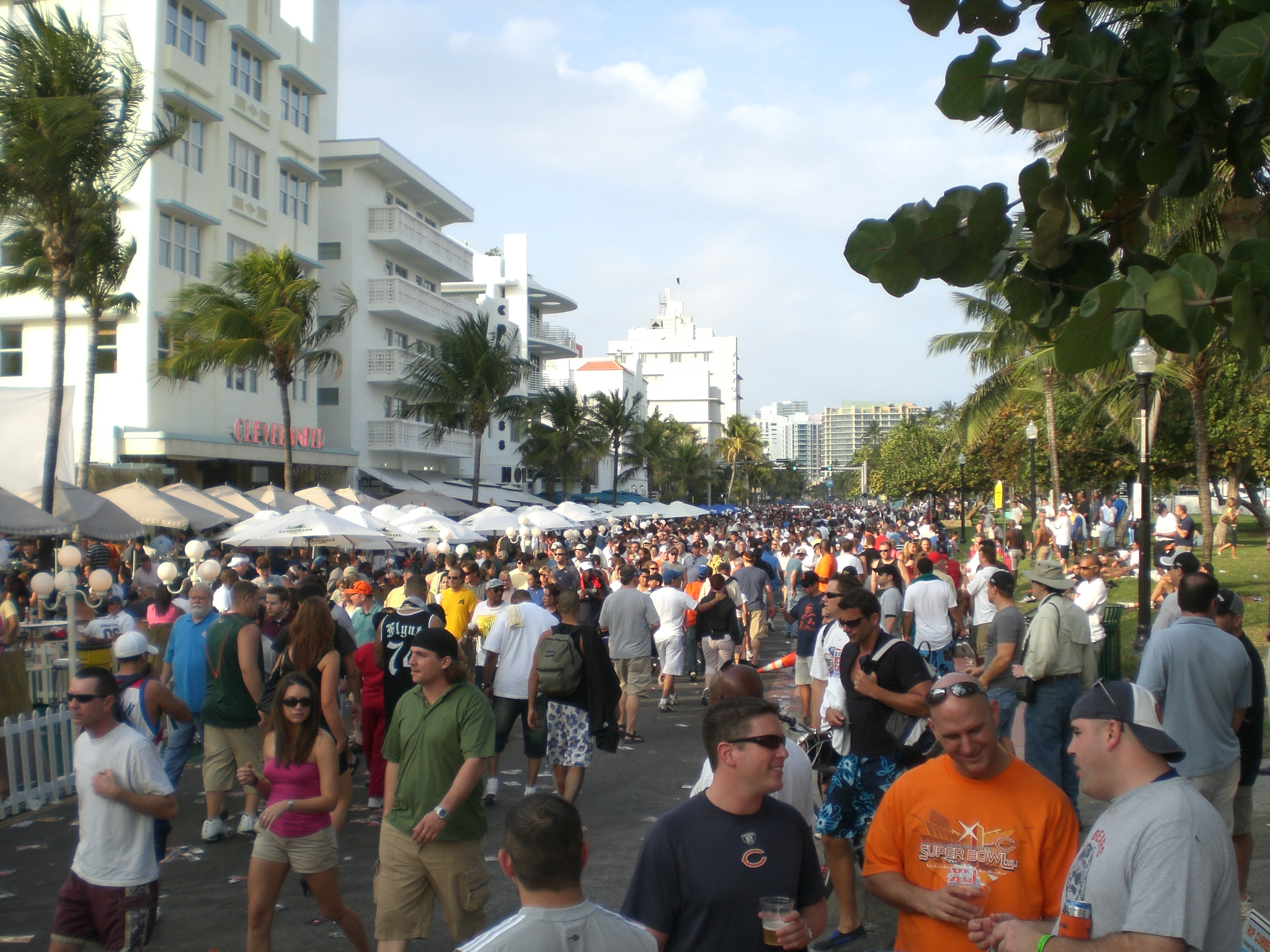
Ocean Drive on Super Bowl XLI weekend, 2007

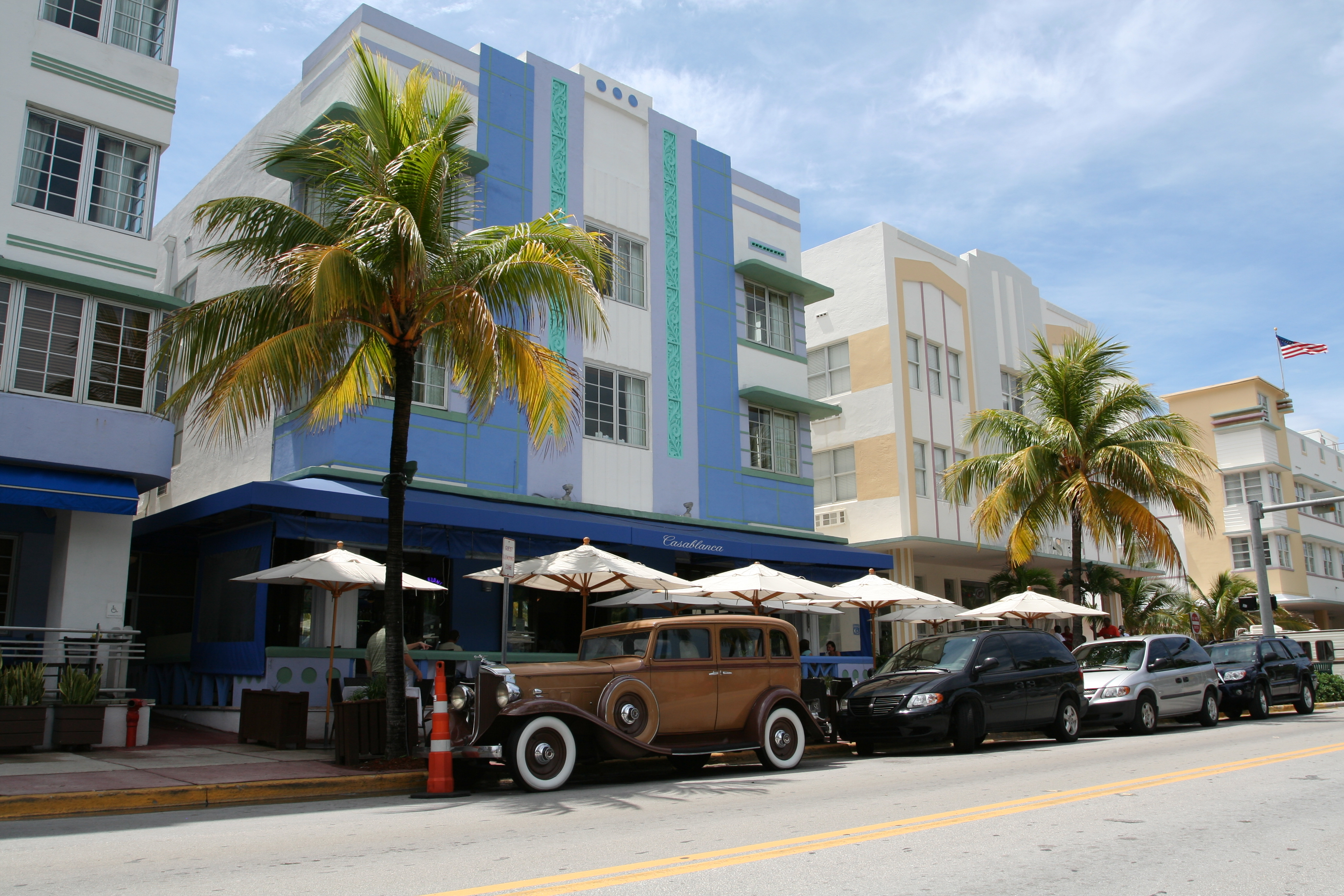
Typical art deco buildings

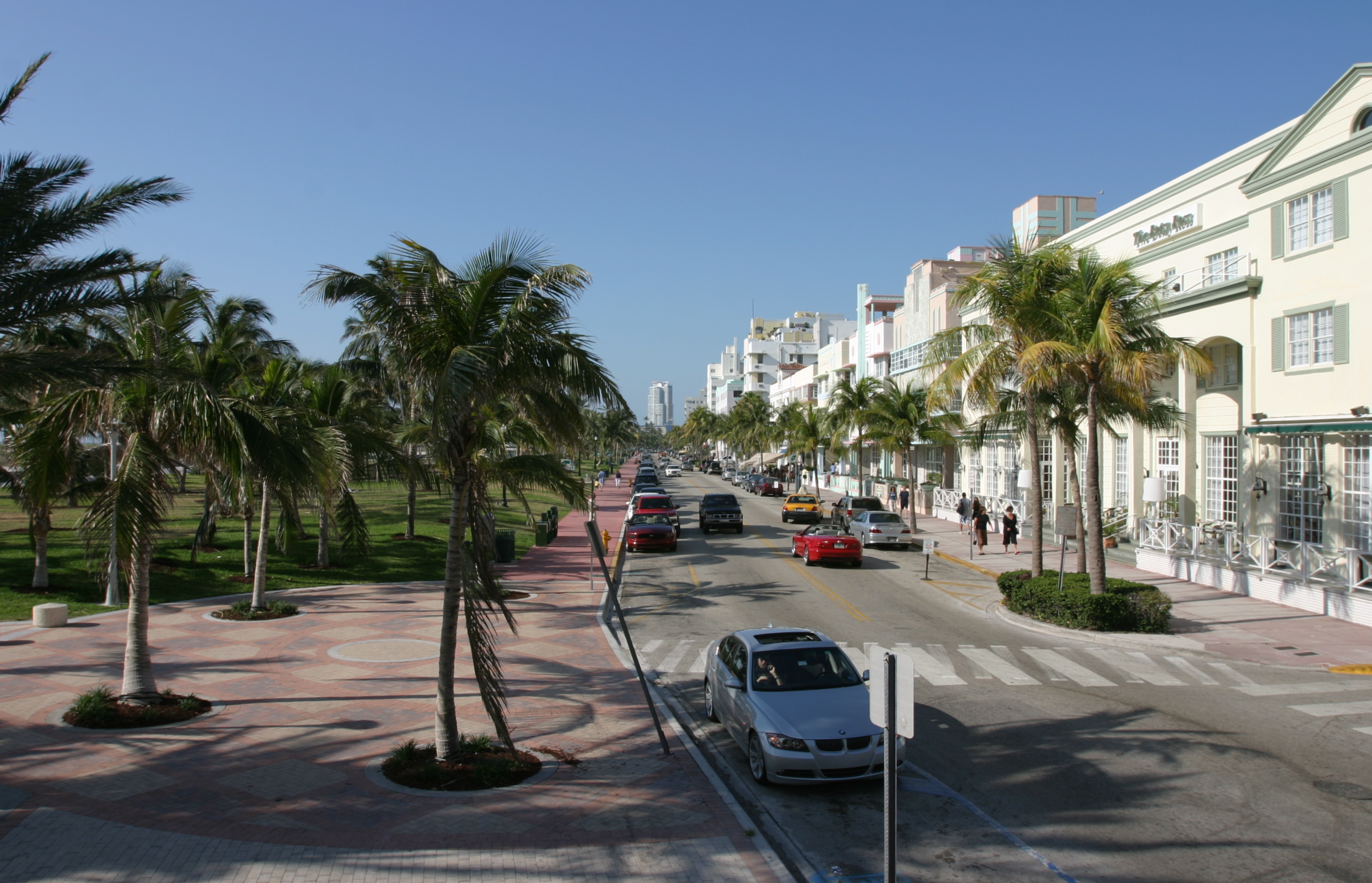
South Beach

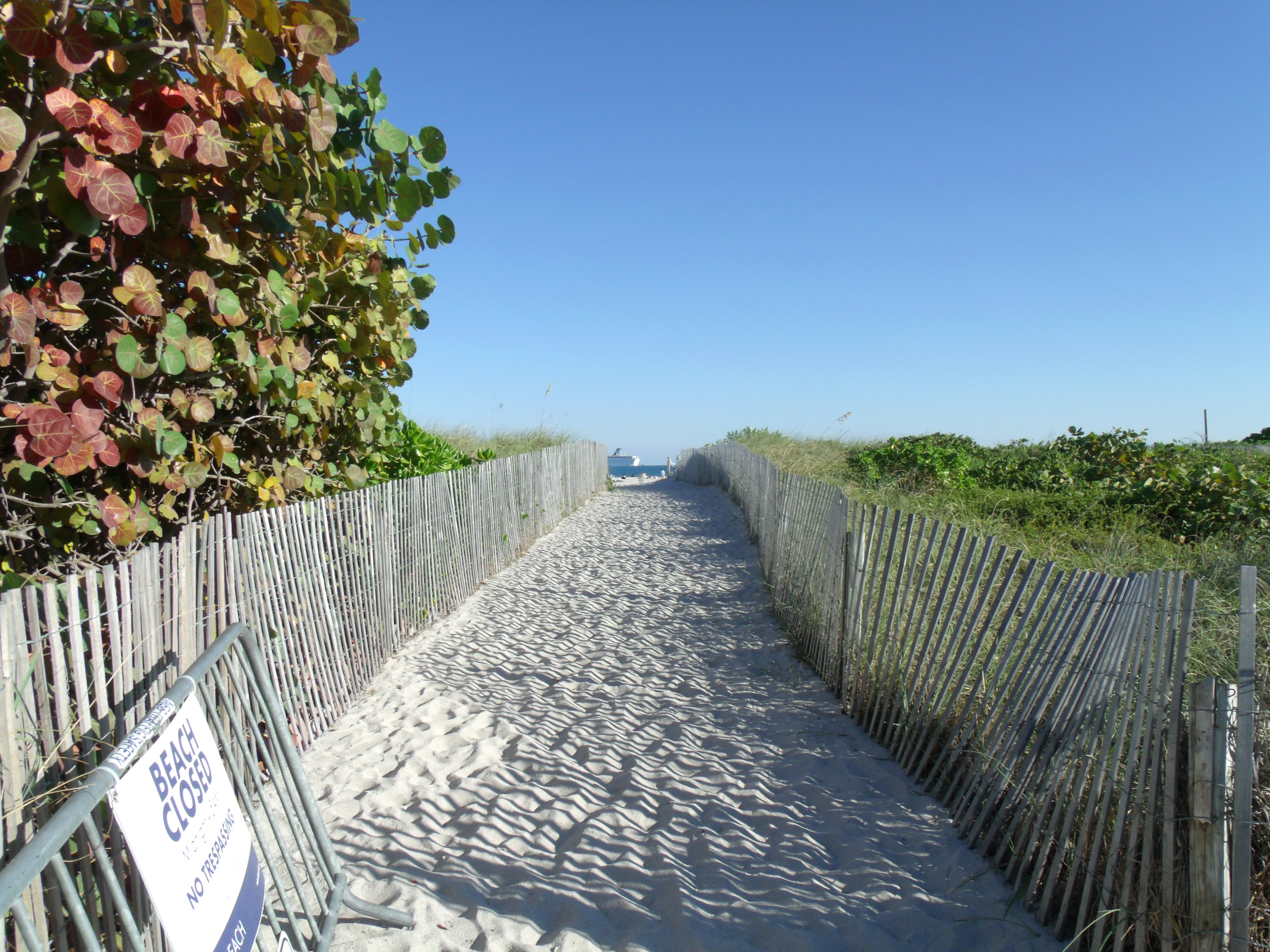
Beach access in Ocean Drive

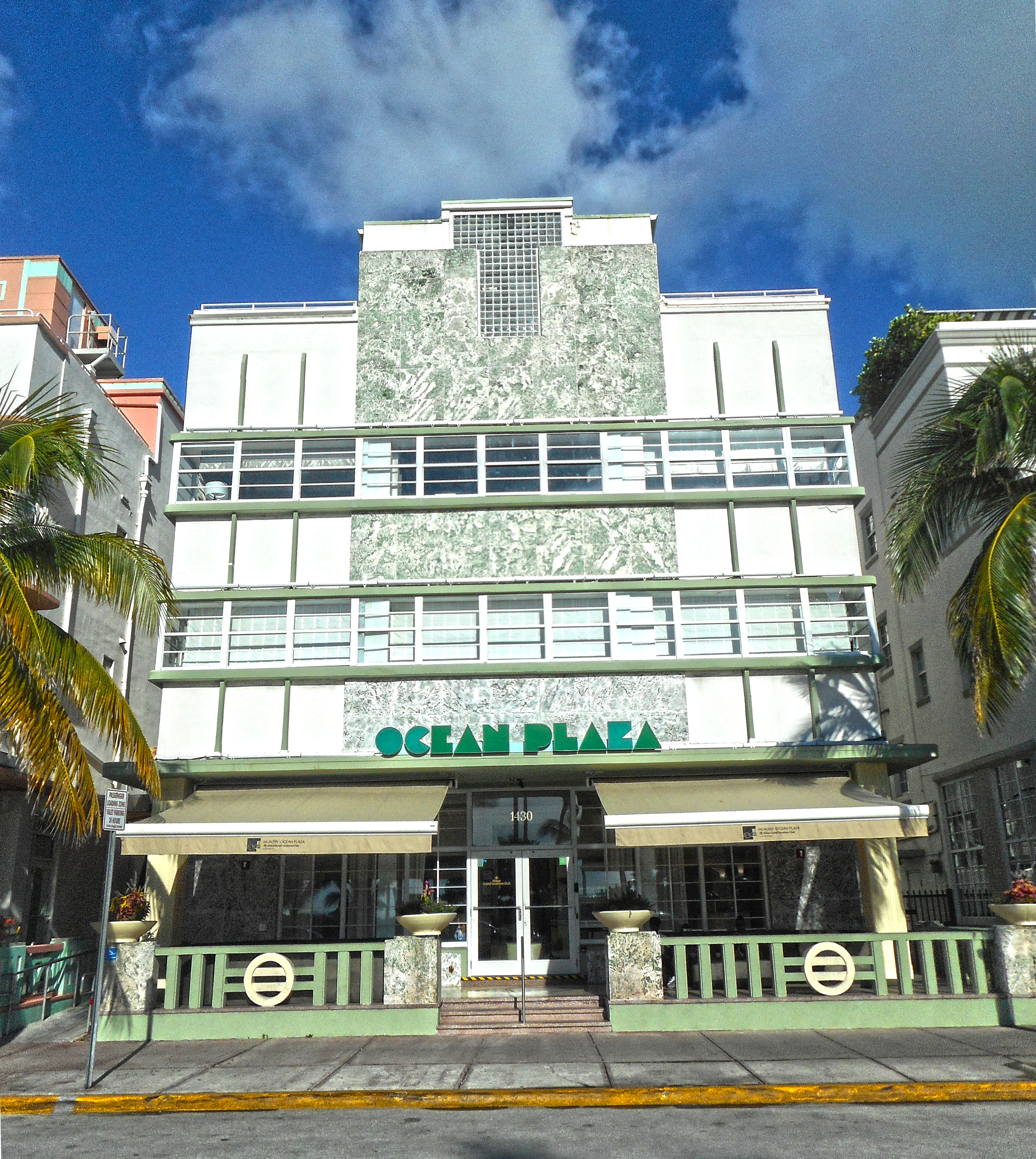
Ocean Plaza Hotel

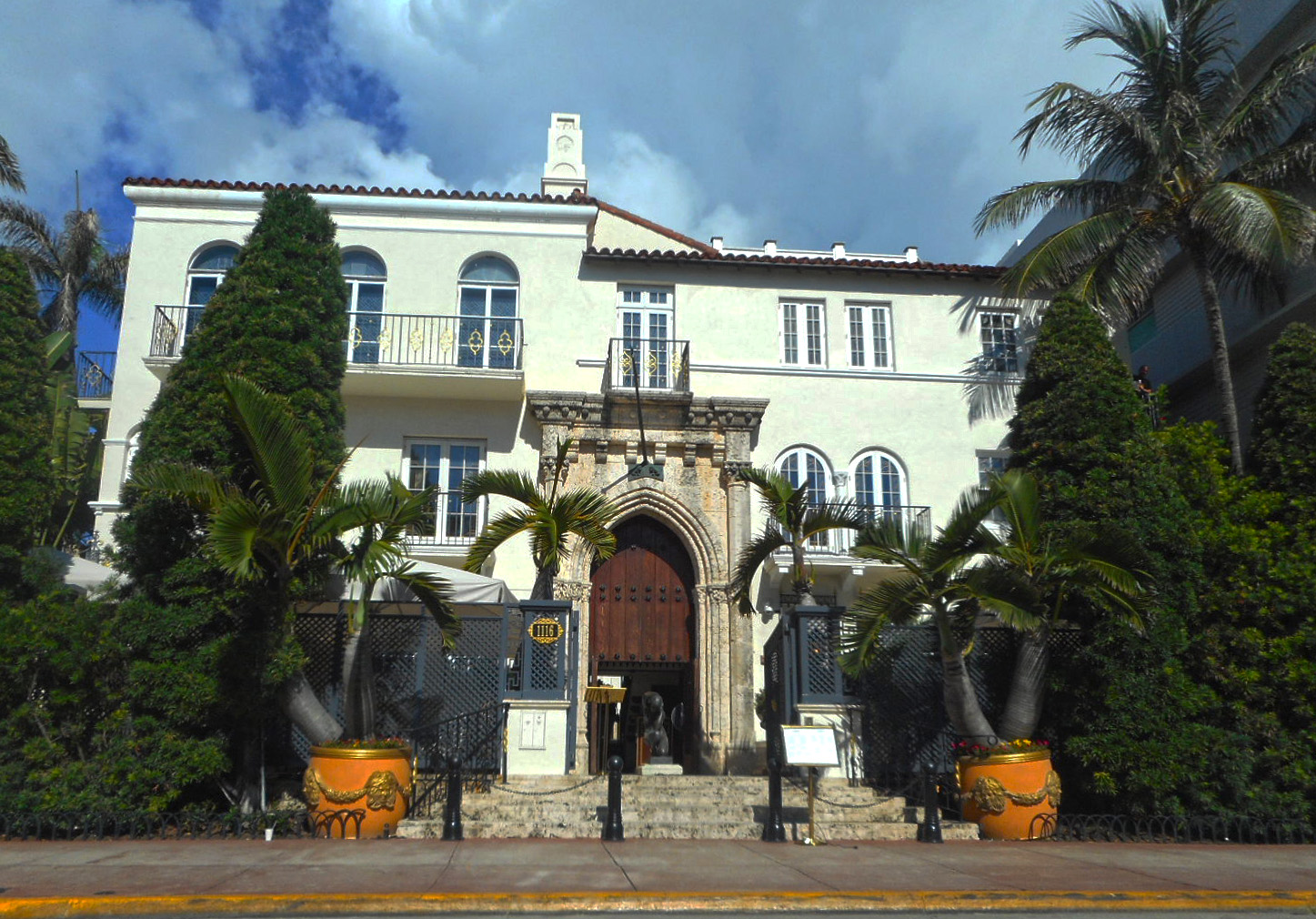
Versace Mansion - Casa Casuarina

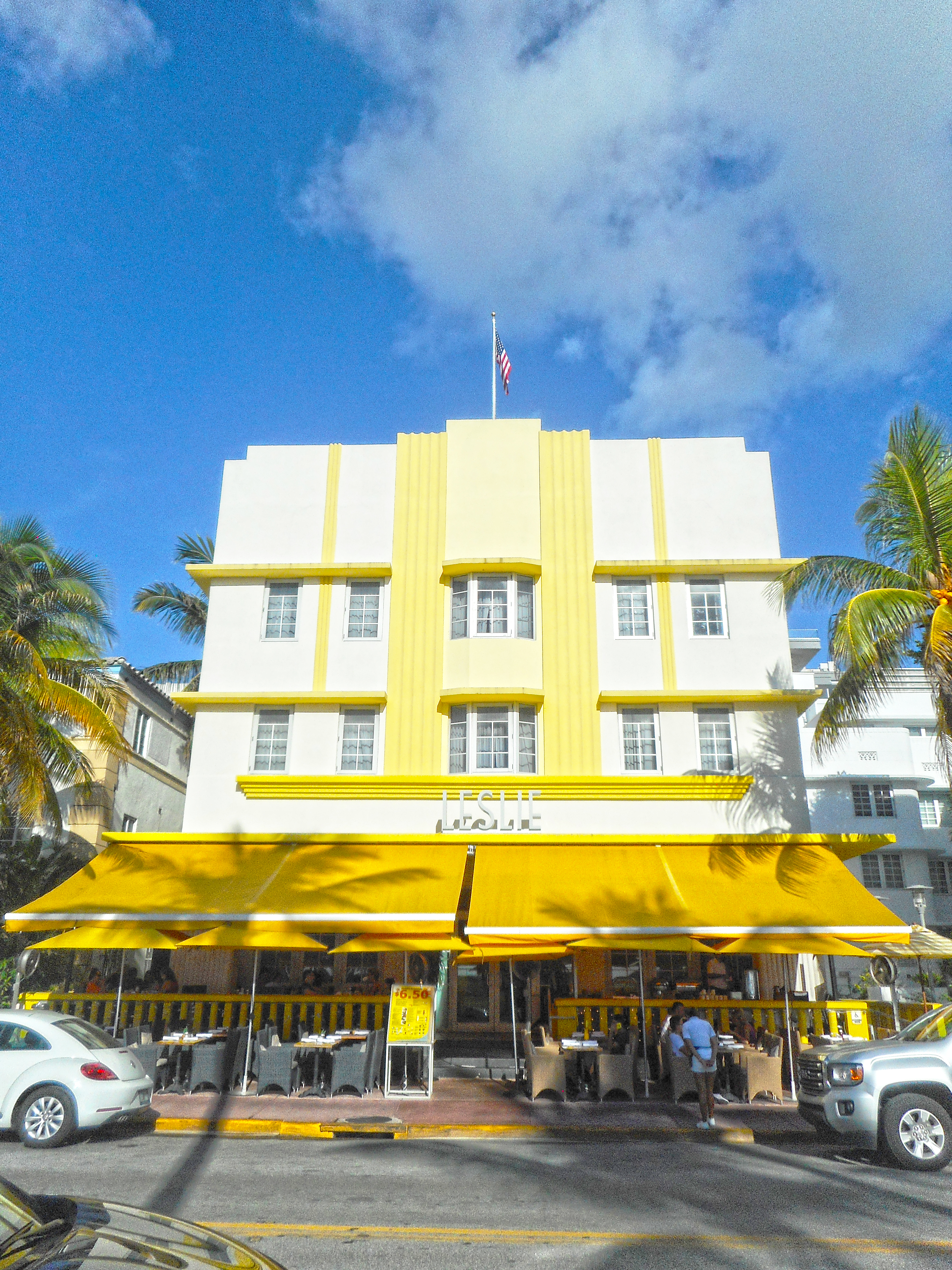
Leslie Hotel

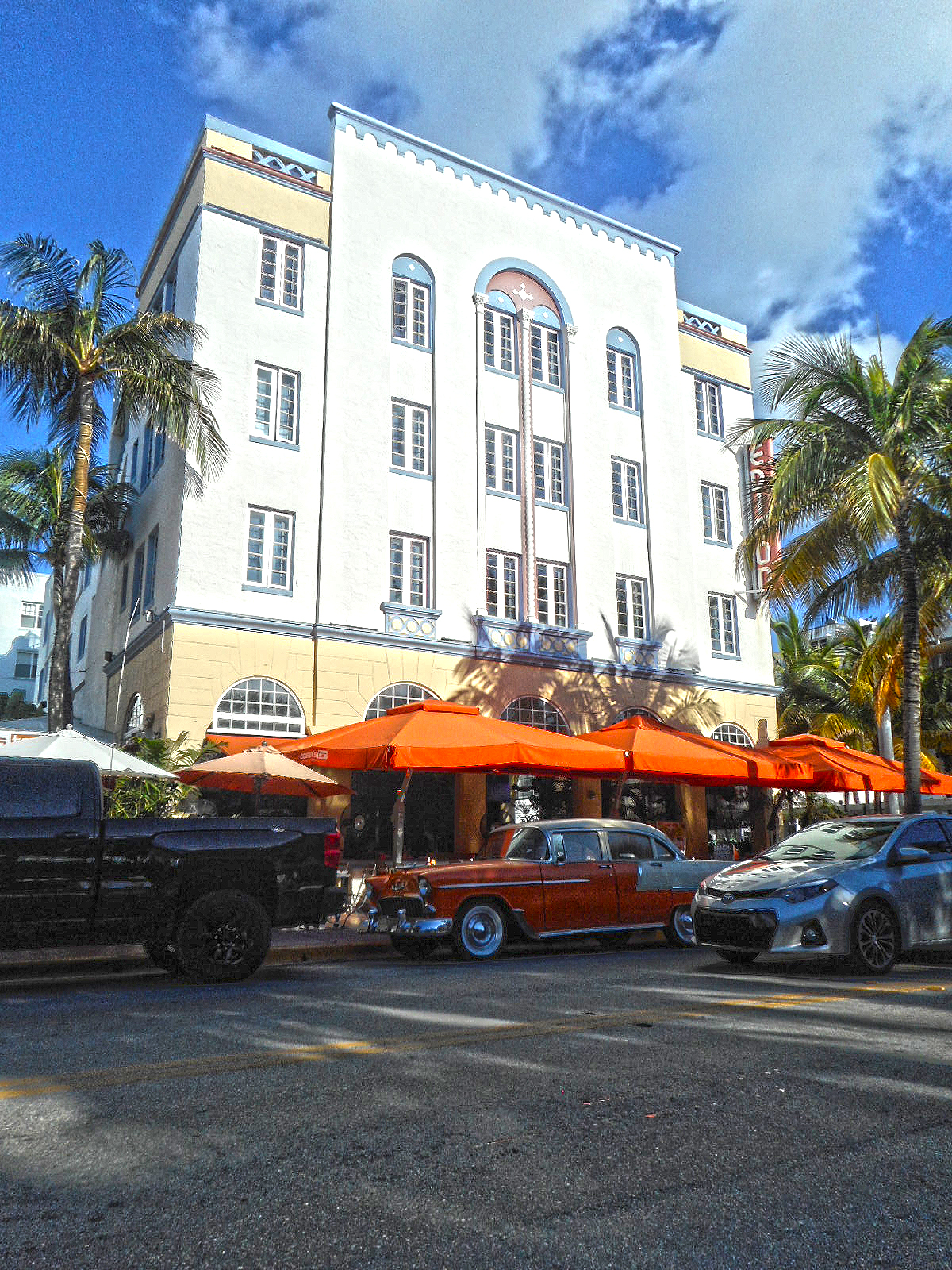
Edison Hotel

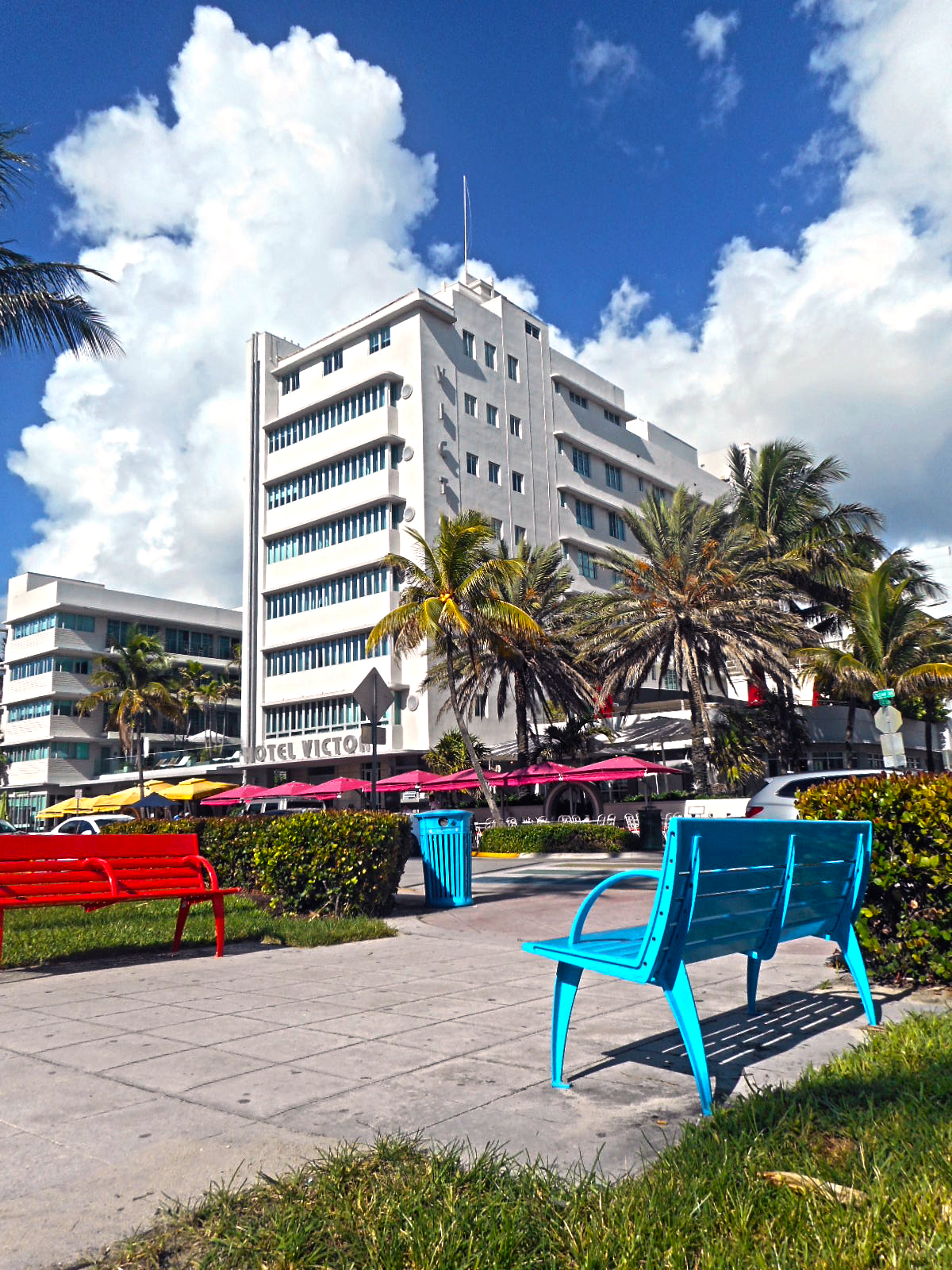
Victor Hotel viewed from Lummus Park

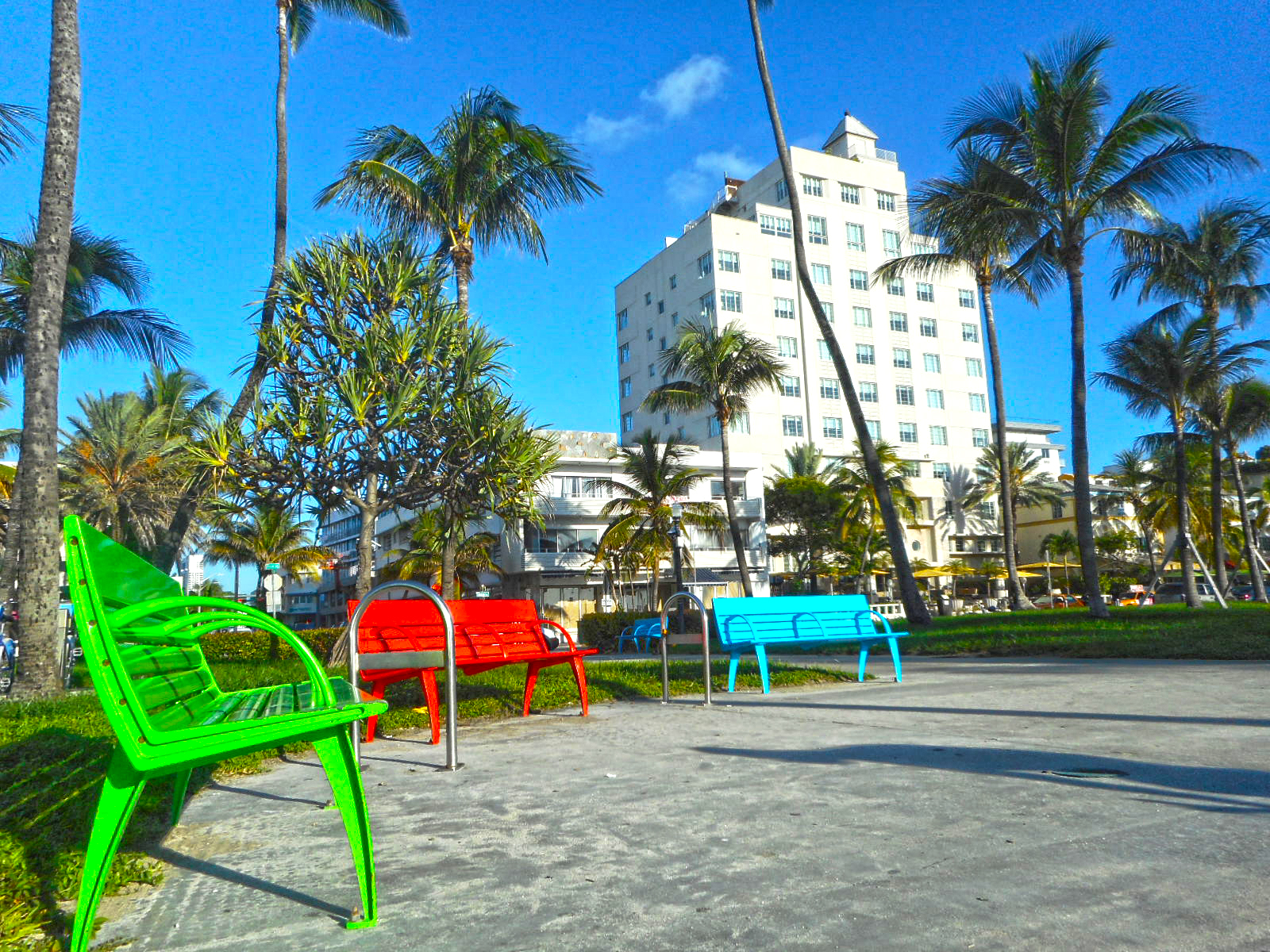
Tides Hotel from Lummus Park

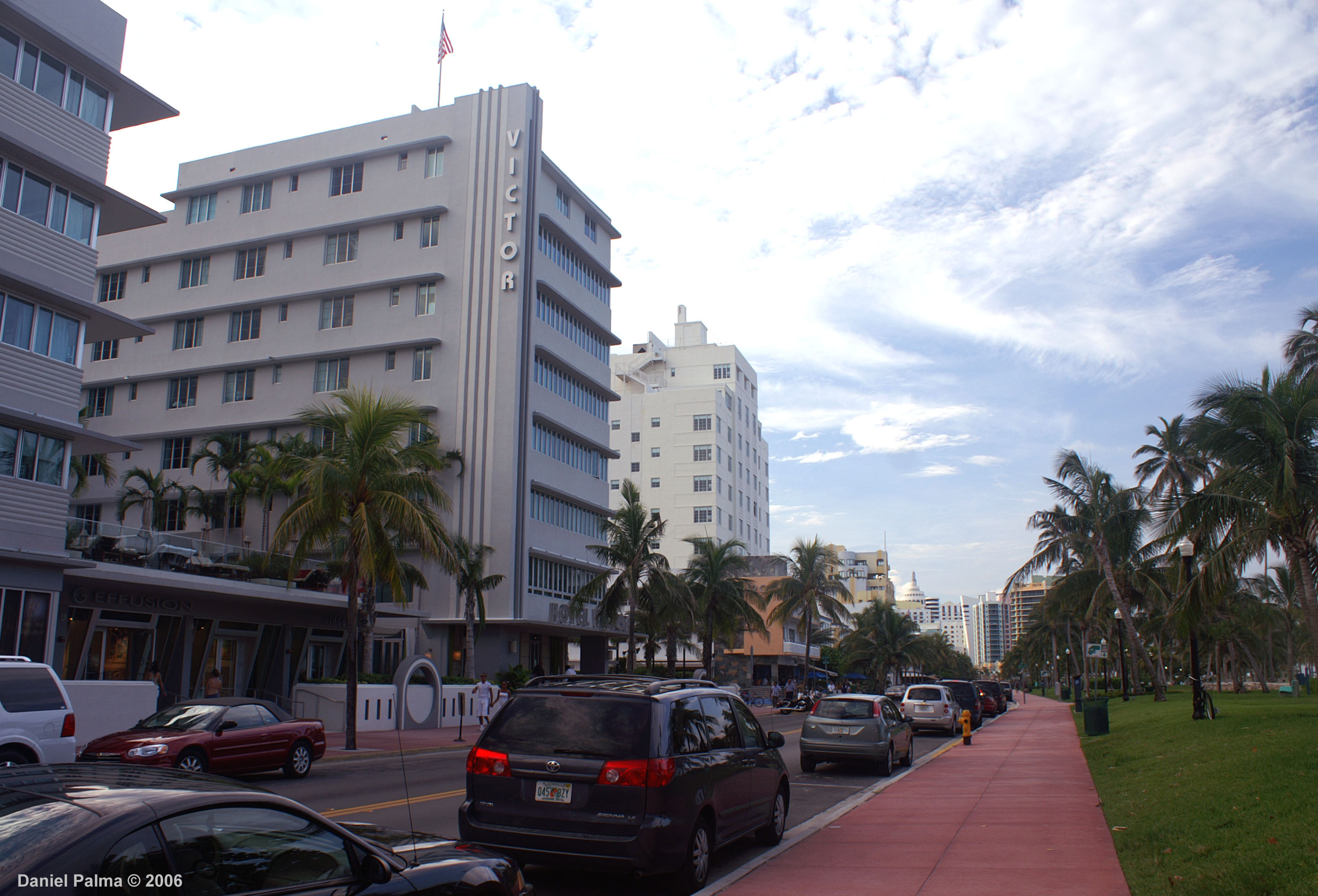
View north with Victor Hotel on the left of picture.

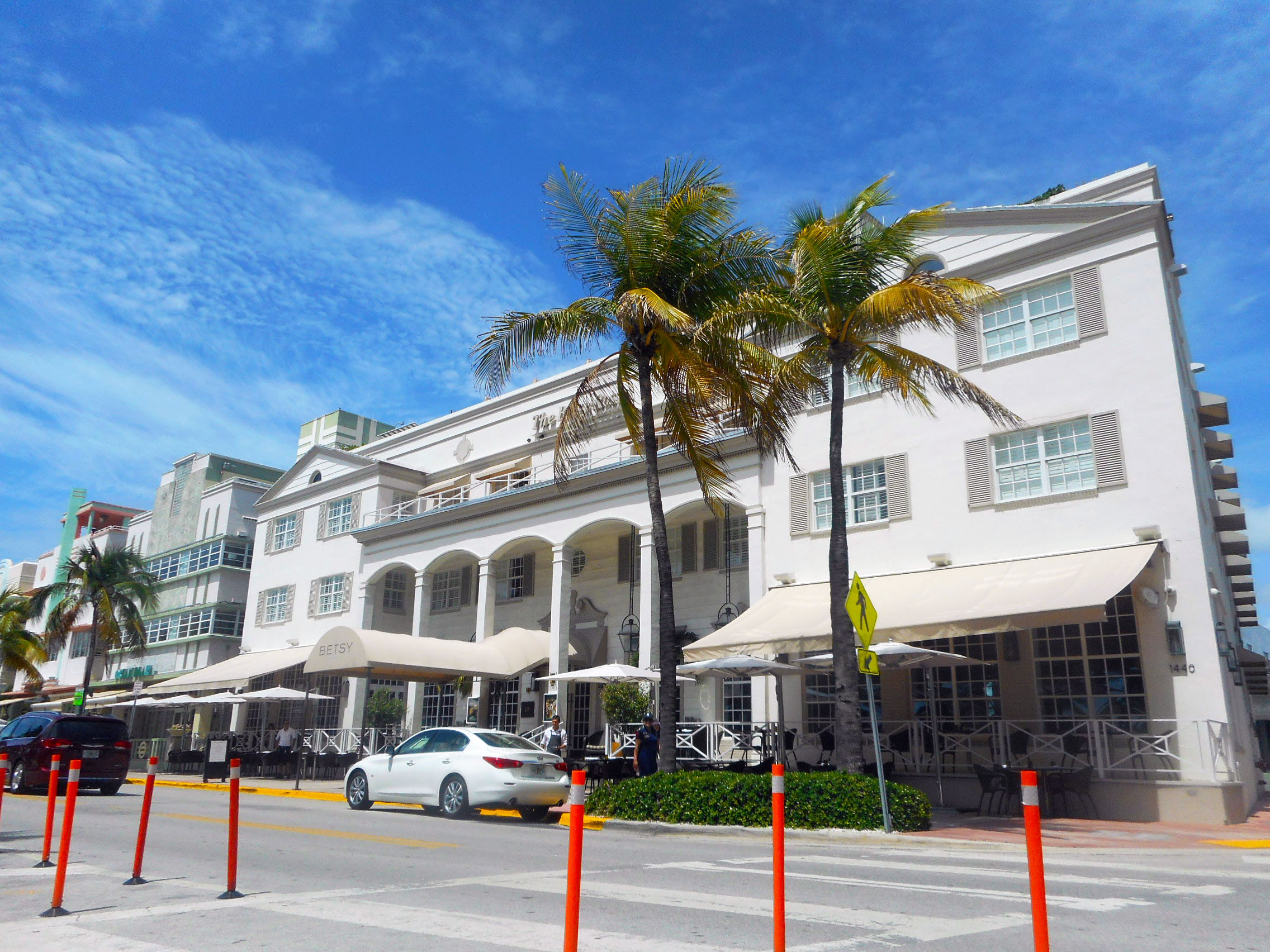
Betsy Hotel

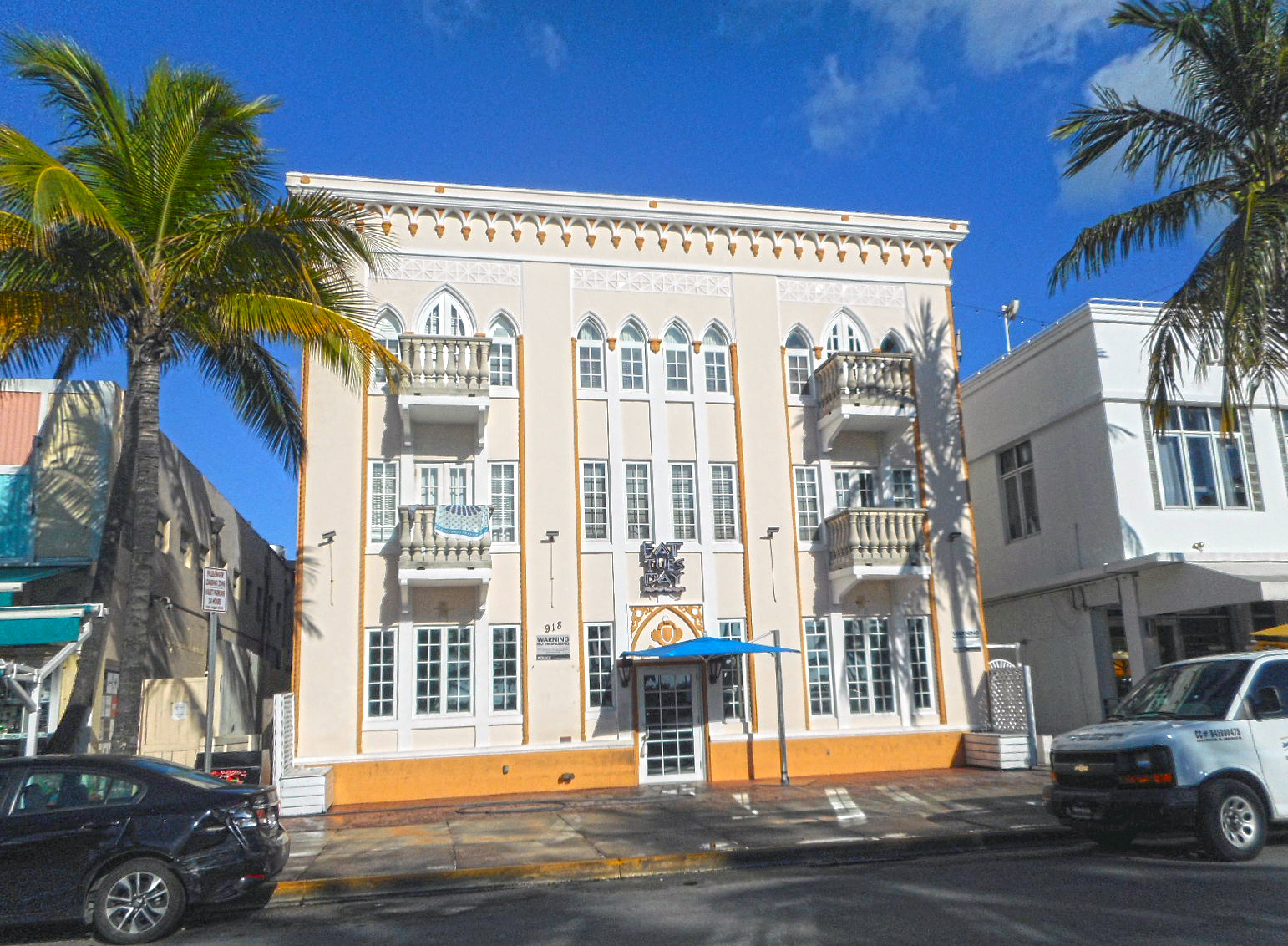
Fat Tuesday Miami Beach

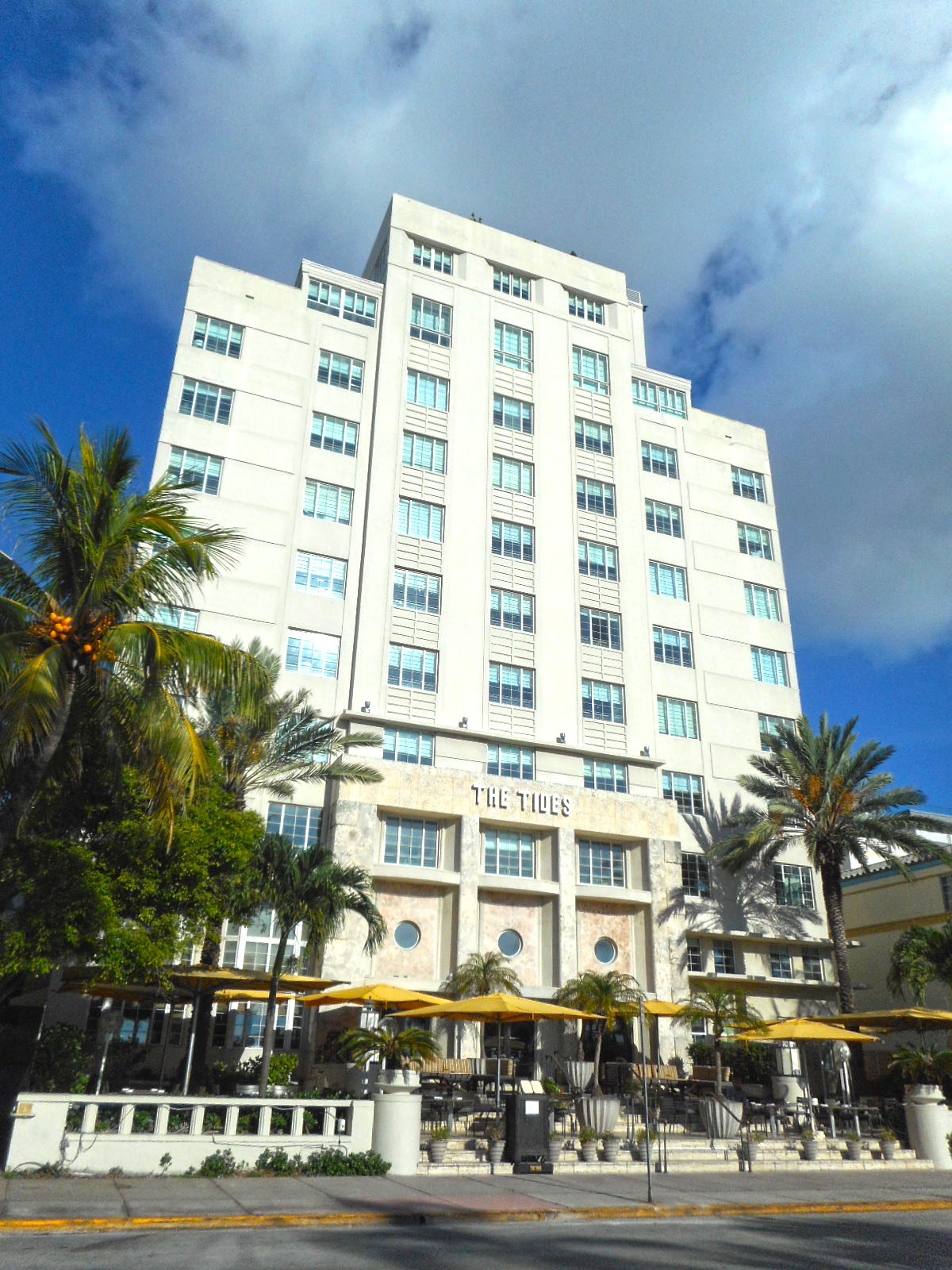
The Tides Hotel
