= South Pointe Park =

Park in Miami Beach, Florida

Coordinates: 25.766156°N 80.132926°W

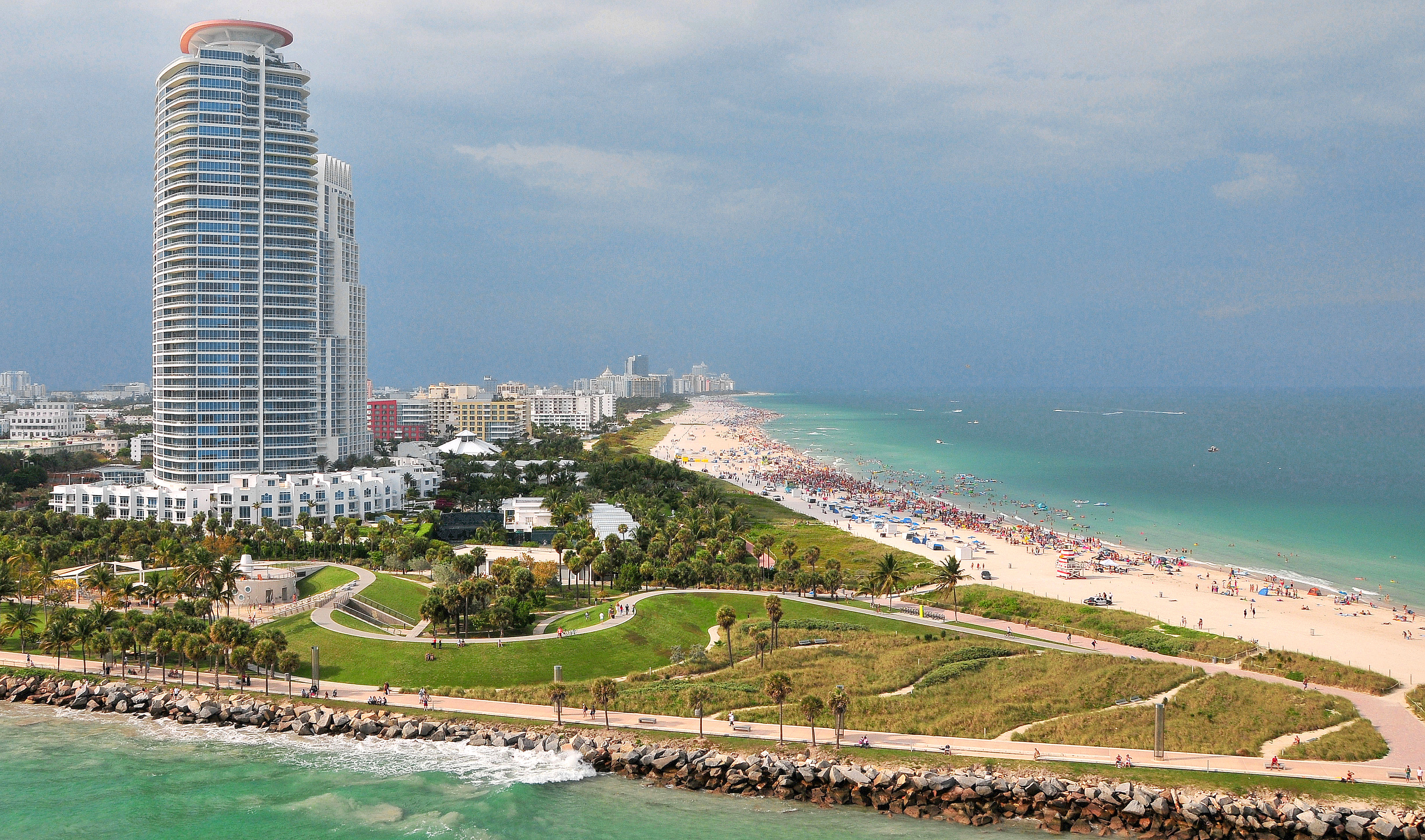
- Aerial photo of South Pointe
- Interactive map of South Pointe Park
- Type: Municipal
- Location: South Beach, Miami-Dade County, Florida, United States
- Area: 17 acres (6.9 ha)
- Created: 1979
- Operator: Miami-Dade County Parks and Recreation Department
- Status: Open all year

South Pointe Park, known locally as South Pointe, is a 17-acre (6.9 ha) county urban park in metropolitan Miami, in the South Beach neighborhood of Miami Beach, Florida.

== History ==
The Federal Government donated the land to Miami Beach in 1979, which used it as a home to police horse stables, a police intelligence unit and the Port of Miami's harbor pilots until all buildings remaining at the site were razed in 1984 to begin conversion a park. The federal government paid half the construction cost.

Opening on October 25, 1985, it became the nineteenth public park in Miami Beach, built at a cost of $3.6 million (1984). Initial features included an amphitheater, two wooden observation towers, picnic pavilions, fitness courses and a 522-foot (159 m) wooden boardwalk over Miami Beach's last natural sand dune. During planning phases, city officials worried it would become a home to vagrants, and to discourage that they planned the park to be a home to frequent festivals and other events. The park became part of a larger plan in the 1980s to renovate the city's run down South Pointe area.

Renovation plans were first drawn up in the city's 1995 master plan, but it wasn't until 2008 that the park underwent a major renovation program. The Hargreaves Associates, of New York City, were hired to redesign the park. The renovation was completed 20 months later around March 2009, at a cost of $22.5 million. Features added in the renovation included 20-foot (6.1 m)-wide walkways lined with Florida limestone and an ocean-themed children's playground.

== Amenities ==
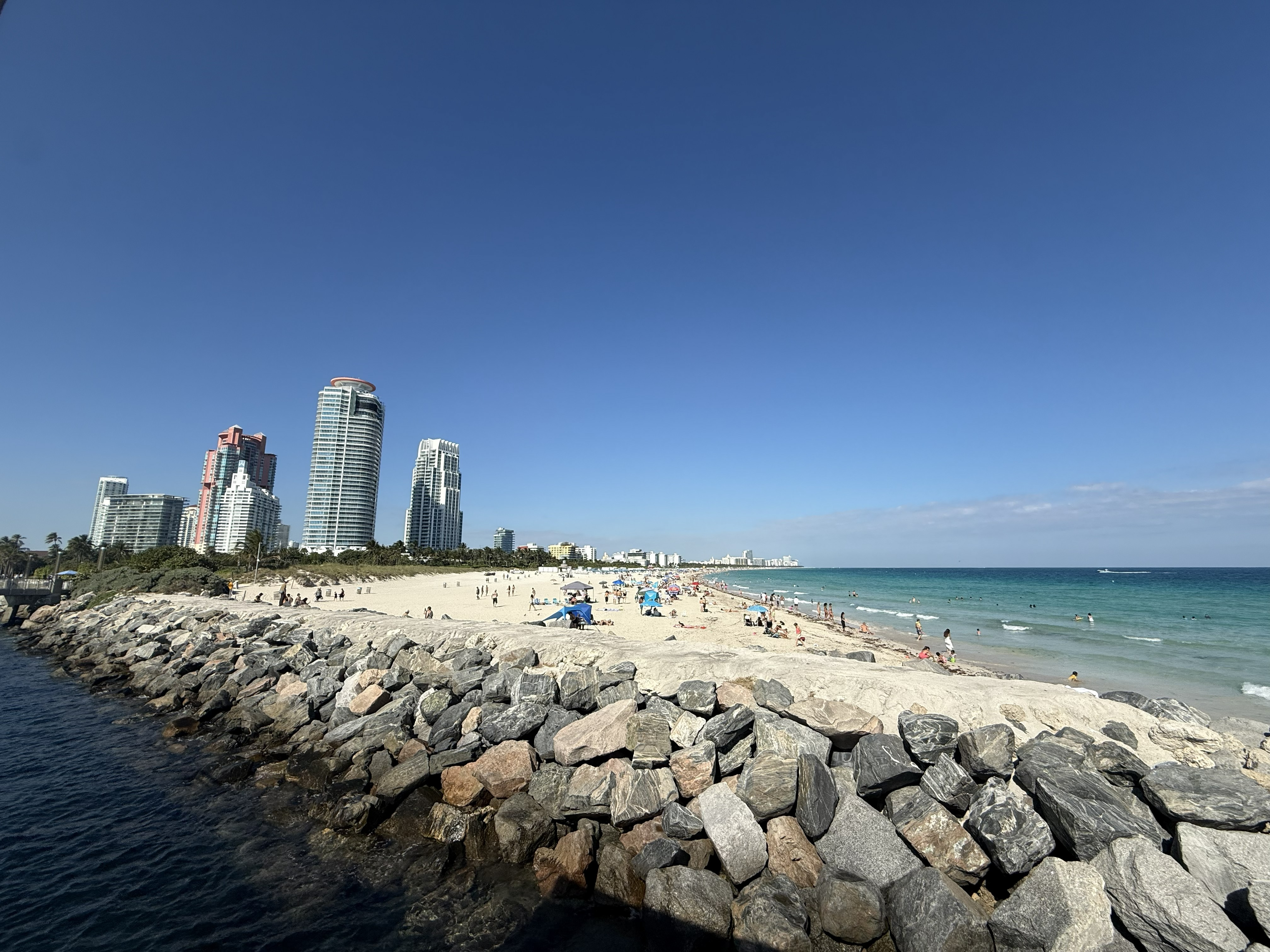
View from the pier.

The park offers various features, including a restaurant, frozen yogurt concession, kids area, a dog park, and outdoor showers. South Pointe is the southernmost point of South Beach, bordering Government Cut to the south and the Port of Miami east-northeast. The area offers panoramic views of Biscayne Bay, Fisher Island, Downtown Miami, and the Atlantic Ocean.

== See also ==
- South Beach
- Miami Beach
- Lummus Park
