= List of artificial islands =

Overview of the world's artificial islands

This is a list of artificial islands.

== Table ==
Name	Country	Area (km^{2})	Population	Notes
Flevopolder	Netherlands	970	462,880	The Flevopolder is an island polder forming the bulk of Flevoland, a province of The Netherlands.
Caofeidian	China	60		
Dongjiang Island	China	33.5		Cargo transfer and wetland reconstruction.
Jurong Island	Singapore	32	0	Formed by the amalgamation of seven natural islands
Eko Atlantic	Nigeria	25		Created from the Atlantic Ocean via reclamation
Sanya Hongtangwan International Airport	China	23.99		International Airport under construction.
Hong Kong International Airport (Chek Lap Kok)	Hong Kong	21.08	0	Mostly on reclaimed land. Some of it is on the now merged Chek Lap Kok and Lam Chau islands.
Dalian Jinzhouwan International Airport	China	21	0	International Airport under construction.
Khazar Islands	Azerbaijan	20	0	Planned city
Subi Reef	Disputed	16	200	Currently being converted into an island by China as part of the Great Wall of Sand. Also claimed by Vietnam, the Philippines and Taiwan.
Qianhai	China	14.92		
Diyar Al Muharraq	Bahrain	12	50,000	City located in Muharraq.
Cuarteron Reef	Disputed	8	0	Currently being converted into an island by China as part of the Great Wall of Sand. Also claimed by Vietnam, the Philippines and Taiwan.
Macau New Urban Zones	Macau	7.3		
Northern City	Bahrain	7	1,000	
Mischief Reef	Disputed	5.58	0	Currently being converted into an island by China as part of the Great Wall of Sand. Also claimed by Vietnam, the Philippines and Taiwan.
Durrat Al Bahrain	Bahrain	5	1,000	
Amwaj Islands	Bahrain	4.31	10,000	
Donauinsel	Austria	4	0	In the Danube (Vienna)
Ocean Flower Island	China	3.81		
Qingdao Oriental Movie Metropolis	China	3.76		
Pulau Semakau	Singapore	3.5	0	Singapore's first offshore and only remaining landfill.
Fiery Cross Reef	Disputed	2.74	200	Currently being converted into an island by China as part of the Great Wall of Sand. Also claimed by Vietnam, the Philippines and Taiwan.
Pulau Punggol Barat	Singapore	1.92	0	
Harbor Island	United States	1.64	3	
Bahrain Bay	Bahrain	1.35	100	
Peberholm	Denmark	1.3		
Pulau Punggol Timor	Singapore	1.12	0?	
King Fahd Passport Island	Bahrain Saudi Arabia	0.88	10	Shared island between Saudi Arabia and Bahrain. Also known as Middle Island, Embankment 4.
Reef Island	Bahrain	0.713	3,000	Also known as Lulu Island.
Ontario Place East and West Island	Canada	0.6273	0	Theme park in Ontario.
Flakfortet	Denmark	0.3		Copenhagen harbour
Freedom Island	Philippines	0.3		
Heirisson Island	Australia	0.2856	0	Created from pre-existing smaller islands via reclamation. Swan River, Western Australia
Île Notre-Dame	Canada	0.25	0	Located in Montreal
Gaven Reefs	Disputed	0.136	0	Currently being converted into an island by China as part of the Great Wall of Sand. Also claimed by Vietnam, the Philippines and Taiwan.
Chinese Garden	Singapore	0.135	0	
Johnson South Reef	Disputed	0.109	0	Currently being converted into an island by China as part of the Great Wall of Sand. Also claimed by Vietnam, the Philippines and Taiwan.
Hughes Reef	Disputed	0.076	0	Currently being converted into an island by China as part of the Great Wall of Sand. Also claimed by Vietnam, the Philippines and Taiwan.
Neft Daşları (Oil Rocks)	Azerbaijan	0.07	2000	Built by connecting several oil platforms
Middelgrundsfortet	Denmark	0.07		Copenhagen harbour (also known as Middelgrunden)
Pearl Island	Singapore	0.019	0	
Coral Island	Singapore	0.017	0	
Langlütjen II	Germany	0.017	0	Sold to a private owner.
Langlütjen I	Germany	0.016	0	Sold.
Île aux Cygnes	France	0.013	0	
Wilhelmstein	Germany	0.0125	0	
Sealand	United Kingdom (de jure) Sealand (de facto)	0.004	2	
Sandy Island	Singapore	0.0007	0	
Queen Elizabeth II Island	Australia		0	
Bahrain Lagoon	Bahrain			Future artificial planned island
China Dafeng Port Economic Zone	China			
Dayang Port	China			
Dongjiakou Dock	China			
Fisherman's Island	Australia		0	Created by land reclaiming Bishop Island into the Port of Brisbane
Fort Boyard	France		250	Fort
Jizuishi Shipyard	China			
Lanqiao Port	China			
Le Havre Port	France			
Longxue Island Shipyard and Port	China			
Lüsi Harbour	China			
Maojia Port	China			
MOSE	Italy			An artificial island was created in Lido inlet as part of the flood defenses for Venice
Nigehörn	Germany		0	
Paradise Island	Singapore		0	
Qingdao Linghai Hot Spring Golf Club	China			
Qingdao Port	China			
Rizhao Port	China			
Salman City	Bahrain			
Sangang Harbour	China			Jiangsu
Shawan Harbour	China			Yancheng, Jiangsu
Treasure Island	Singapore		0	
Trekroner Fort	Denmark			Copenhagen harbour
Xiamen Xiang'an International Airport	China			
Xiaogoukou	China			Binhai, Yancheng
Ximazhou Shipyard Island	China			
Xinkaihe Harbour	China			
Yangshan Deepwater Port	China			
Zhanghe Airport	China			
Zhewangzhen Port	China			Jiangsu
Zhuhai General Aviation Airport	China			
Zuhai Jinwan Airport	China			
Zuhai Jiuzhou Airport	China			
(unnamed amusement park)	China			Amusement Park at Liuye Lake, Changde
Banana Island, Lagos	Nigeria			An artificial island off the foreshore of Ikoyi, Lagos, Nigeria
Gracefield Island	Nigeria			Created via land reclamation from the Lagos Lagoon
Kashagan Field	Kazakhstan			

== Australia ==
- Areas around the Gold Coast region

== Bahamas ==
- Ocean Cay

== Bahrain ==
- New Bahrain International Airport

== Bolivia ==
See #Peru/Bolivia

== Brazil ==
- Cidade Universitária (Rio de Janeiro)
- Jangadeiros Island

== Bulgaria ==
- In Varna, a portion of the southern industrial and port zone on a 2-km wide isthmus between the Black Sea and Lake Varna became an artificial island in 1976 when it became separated from the shore by two navigable canals.

== Colombia ==
=== Bolívar Department ===
- Santa Cruz del Islote

== China ==
- Dongjiang, an island at Bohai Bay, near Beijing, 33.5 km^{2}, for cargo transfer and wetlands reconstruction.
- Runways of Shanghai Pudong Airport
- Port and Urban Areas around Xiamen, Shantou & Ningbo-Zhoushan
- Amusement Park at Liuye Lake Changde
- Zhanghe Airport, Jingmen
- Zhuhai General Aviation Airport
- Several Islands off the coast of Fengchengzhen, Shandong
- Coastal Extensions around Bindao Island, Weihai
- Rizhao Port
- Xinjiancun Coast Islands
- Qingdao Linghai Hot Spring Golf Club
- Qingdao Port
- Maojia Port, Qidong City
- Rudong Coast Extensions
- Extensions on coasts around Yangjia Bay
- Islands off the coast of Lingezhuang
- Dongzhuang Coast Extensions
- Longkou Harbor Port and Islands
- Banweiba Ditch Port & Coastal extensions
- Land bordering Bailang Estuary
- Jiangdao Coast Extensions
- Lianyungang Port
- Ganyu Coast
- Rudong Yangkou Harbour
- Shenzhen Bao'an International Airport Runway
- Ports of Pingtan Island
- Ports of Jiangyin Island, Fuqing, Fuzhou
- Lands surrounding Luoyuan Bay, Luoyuan, Fuzhou
- Ports in Xinghua Bay

=== Hong Kong ===
- Hong Kong International Airport - the main airport for Hong Kong, mostly on reclaimed land, now sits on past Chek Lap Kok and Lam Chau.
- Hong Kong Convention and Exhibition Centre - new wing on a man-made island off the coast of the old wing at Wan Chai.
- An artificial island in the artificial Inspiration Lake in the former Penny's Bay
- Macau Ferry Terminal - an artificial island connected by a skyway to another artificial island, and further connected by two other skyways to Shun Tak Centre.
- Nam Wan
- A former knoll in the Shek Pik Reservoir
- A former knoll in the Shing Mun (Jubilee) Reservoir
- Shui Keng Teng - a former knoll isolated from the mainland after construction of High Island Reservoir
- Former knolls and hills in the Tai Lam Chung Reservoir
- The central tower of Ting Kau Bridge stands on an artificial island in the Rambler Channel.
- The west tower of Tsing Ma Bridge stands on an artificial island in the Ma Wan Channel
- Duplicate Tsing Yi South Bridge - two artificial islets to the south of two bridge columns, to prevent ships from colliding with the bridge.
- Southern half of Lamma Power Station
- Hong Kong–Macau–Zhuhai Bridge Hong Kong Control Point
- Breakwaters of many typhoon shelters
- An island at the confluence of River Sutlej and River Beas into River Indus, where Sheung Shui Abattoir and Shek Wu Hui Sewage Treatment Works are located.
- Shatin Floating Restaurant (aka Treasure Floating Restaurant, Star Seafood Floating Restaurant)
- Tsing Tsuen Bridge - two artificial islands to the north of the two bridge columns

Former

- West Kowloon Reclamation during its construction stage

=== Macau ===
- Aterro da "Zona A" dos Novos Aterros Urbanos
- Aterro da "Zona C" dos Novos Aterros Urbanos
- Centro Ecuménico Kun Iam
- Macau International Airport
- Portas do Entendimento
- Islets in the Lagos Nam Van
- Zhuhai-Macau Port Artificial Island (southern half part of Macau)

== Egypt ==
- Coasts of Hurghada
- Coasts of Alexandria
- Ain Sokhna

== Germany ==
- Dithmarschen
- Bremerhaven

== India ==
- Willingdon Island
- Murud-Janjira
- Jag Mandir
- Nehru Garden
- Taj Lake Palace
- Padmadurg
- Kesar Kyari
- Jal Mahal

== Ireland ==
- Bull Island

== Japan ==
- Chubu Centrair International Airport (2000-2005)
- Shinkawa, Chūō, Tokyo
- Dejima in Nagasaki (Historic) (1634)
- Dream Island (Yume No Shima) (1939)
- Islands for Tokyo Disneyland in Urayasu
- Islands for Haneda International Airport runway expansion.
- Hakkeijima
- Heiwa Island, in Tokyo Bay
- Higashi Ogijima
- Island City, Fukuoka (Hakata) harbour
- Kansai International Airport (1994)
- Katsushima
- Kaze no Tō
- Kisarazu Island for Tokyo Bay Aqua-Line
- Kobe Airport
- Malimpia Okinosu
- Midori No Shima, off Hakodate
- New Kitakyushu Airport
- Nagasaki Airport
- Odaiba, Tokyo Bay
- Oogishima
- Painuhama-cho (南ぬ浜町), Ishigaki-shi, Okinawa-ken
- Port Island, Kobe harbour
- Rokkō Island, Kobe harbour
- Showa Island
- The Second Sea Fortress, Tokyo Bay (The first and second fortresses were sunk)
- Umihotaru
- Wakaejima (artificial)
- Wakasu
- Ukishima

== Kuwait ==
- Khiran Sea City
- Green Island (Kuwait)

== Malaysia ==
- Andaman Island, George Town, Penang
- Gazumbo Island, George Town, Penang
- Malacca Island, Malacca City, Malacca.
- Marina island Pangkor, Lumut, Perak.
- Forest City, Johor Bahru, Johor

== Maldives ==
- Gaadhoo (Laamu atoll)
- Gulhifalhu
- Hulhumalé (2004)
- Thilafushi (1992)

== Mexico ==
- Spiral Island, a small floating island

== Montenegro ==
- The Lady Of the Rocks / Gospa od Skrpjela, a small island contribute to Our Lady of the Rocks, situated in the Bay of Kotor.

== Netherlands ==
- Flevoland
- IJburg
- IJsseloog
- Neeltje-Jans
- Pampus
- REM Island
- Maasvlakte
- Marker Wadden

== Oman ==
- Al Mouj Muscat

== Panama ==
- Ocean Reef Islands

== Peru/Bolivia ==
- Artificial floating islands made of reed on Lake Titicaca, made by the Uru people

== Qatar ==
- Lusail, new development north of Doha with several artificial islands.
- The Pearl
- Hamad International Airport
- Ras Laffan
- Hamad Port
- Banana Island

== Russia ==
Nineteen artificial islands in the Gulf of Finland for fortresses.

- Cherepakha Islet
- Federation Island
- New Holland Island
- Sukho (island)
- Port of Bronka
- Sviyazhsk

== Saudi Arabia ==
- King Abdullah Port
- Manifah Field
- King Abdul Aziz Sea Port
- Yanbu Island
- Jazan Economic City
- King Fahd Industrial Ports
- Areas around Alkhobar & Dhahran
- King Salman International Complex for Maritime Industries
- Coast line of Jeddah

== Solomon Islands ==
- Sulufou
- Adagege
- Funaafou
- Foueda
- Niuleni
- Ferasubua
- Saua
- Auki Island

== South Africa ==
- Island in Kamfers Dam, constructed as a flamingo breeding island

== South Korea ==
- Banpo Seorae Island (Seoraeseom)
- Sebitseom (Sebit islets)
- Songdo International Business District
- Yeouido

== Sri Lanka ==
- Hambantota Port

== Taiwan ==
- Phase V redevelopment of Anping, Tainan

== Tonga ==
- Former Republic of Minerva

== United Arab Emirates ==
=== Abu Dhabi ===
- Yas Island
- Al Lulu Island
- Khalifah Port

=== Dubai ===
- Burj al-Arab, a hotel on a small artificial island.
- The Palm Islands (The Palm, Jumeirah, The Palm, Jebel Ali, and The Palm, Deira). The Palm Jebel Ali has had most of its land filled, but both the Palm Jebel Ali and the Palm Deira projects are on hold as of 2013.
- The World Islands, currently uninhabited.
- Bluewaters Island
- Jumeirah Bay Island
- Jumeirah Island 2
- Pearl Jumeirah
- Dubai Harbour
- Dubai Waterfront
- The Universe

=== Ras al Khaimah ===
- Bal al Bahr
- Mina al Arab
- Al Hamra Village

=== Sharjah ===
- Hamriyah
- Flag Island
- Al Khan
- Al Mamzar
- Al Majaz Island

=== Fujairah ===
- Fujairah Port

== United Kingdom ==
=== England ===
- Challis Island, Cambridgeshire
- Crossrail Place, Canary Wharf, Greater London
- Spike Island, Widnes, in Cheshire
- Whale Island, Hampshire, in Portsmouth harbour

=== Scotland ===
- Several hundred crannógs in Scotland

== United States ==
=== Alabama ===
- Gaillard Island, is an artificially created island located in Mobile Bay near Mobile, Alabama. It was built by the United States Army Corps of Engineers, using sand and mud dredged from the Mobile Bay ship channel and elsewhere. The island is an important site for colonial nesting seabirds and shore birds in coastal Alabama and has been the only nesting site for brown pelicans (Pelecanus occidentalis) in Alabama - first discovered in 1983.

=== Alaska ===
- Northstar Island, an island built for oil drilling and extraction from the Northstar Oil Pool in the Beaufort Sea.

=== California ===
- Tom Sawyer Island, Frontierland, Disneyland theme park
- Balboa Island (Newport Beach)
- Treasure Island (San Francisco Bay)
- Rincon Island (off Ventura County Coast)
- THUMS Islands (also called Astronaut Islands) - four artificial island oil platforms (off Long Beach Harbor)
- Coast Guard Island (Oakland Estuary, San Francisco Bay area)
- Long Beach Port

=== Florida ===
- Isola di Lolando (Miami) - Failed artificial island construction project.
- Hibiscus Island (Miami Beach) (1922)
- San Pablo Island (name not official) (Jacksonville Beaches) (1912)
- Palm Island (Miami Beach)
- Peanut Island (Riviera Beach) (1918)
- Star Island (Miami Beach)
- Venetian Islands (Miami Beach) - Includes Belle Isle, Biscayne Island, Di Lido Island and Flagler Monument Island.
- Fisher Island (Miami)
- Watson Island (Miami)
- Dodge Island (Miami)
- Sunset Islands (Miami Beach) - 4 separate, numbered islands
- Brickell Key (Miami)

=== Illinois ===
- Goose Island (Chicago)
- Northerly Island (Chicago)
- Volvo Island (Near Ottawa)

=== Kentucky ===
- Shippingport, a former town now within the boundaries of Louisville that became an island in 1825 when the Louisville and Portland Canal was built as a bypass of the Falls of the Ohio.

=== New Jersey/Delaware ===
- Artificial Island, New Jersey (Alloway Township, New Jersey)/a tiny portion of Delaware

=== New York ===
- U Thant Island (Manhattan)
- Hoffman Island (Staten Island)
- Swinburne Island (Staten Island)

=== Washington ===
- Harbor Island (Seattle)
- Duck Island, in Green Lake Park, Seattle.

=== Wisconsin ===
- Door County (north of the canal)

== Venezuela ==
=== Zulia State ===
- Isla La Salina
- Isla Dorada

=== Anzoátegui State ===
- Isla Paraíso

== Land disconnected by artificial canals ==
- Africa has been separated from Eurasia by the Suez Canal
- Barnegat Peninsula, New Jersey, United States (Point Pleasant Canal)
- Cape Cod, Massachusetts, United States (Cape Cod Canal)
- Cape Henlopen, Rehoboth Beach, Delaware, and environs (Lewes and Rehoboth Canal)
- Cape Island, New Jersey, United States (Cape May Canal)
- Cijin/Kaohsiung Port, Kaohsiung, Taiwan
- Delmarva Peninsula, United States (Chesapeake & Delaware Canal; lockless)
- Western Europe (Rhône–Rhine Canal and rivers)
- Finland, Norway, Sweden, Murmansk Oblast, most of the Republic of Karelia, and a portion of Leningrad Oblast (White Sea–Baltic Canal)
- Fenwick Island, Delaware and Maryland, United States (Assawoman Canal)
- Southern Florida (Okeechobee Waterway)
- Southeastern New Jersey (Delaware and Raritan Canal)
- Part of North Carolina (Alligator-Pungo Canal)
- Peloponnese, Greece (Corinth Canal; lockless)
- Sääminginsalo, Saimaa, Finland
- Southern Sweden (Göta Canal and Trollhätte Canal and rivers)
- Sviyazhsk, Russia
- Eastern United States and southeastern Canada (Chicago Sanitary and Ship Canal and Chicago River, Mississippi River, Great Lakes, St. Lawrence Seaway)
- Virginia Beach and Norfolk, Virginia, United States (Albemarle and Chesapeake Canal)
- Eastern Virginia and North Carolina, United States (Dismal Swamp Canal)
- Potonggang-guyok, North Korea, between Pothong River and Pothonggang Canal

== Former hilltops in artificial lakes ==
- Barro Colorado Island, a former hilltop in the Panama Canal Zone, Panama
- René-Levasseur Island, Québec, Canada

== See also ==
- Lists of islands
