= Rosie the Elephant =

Asian elephant from Miami Beach, Florida, U.S.

Rosie, an Asian elephant, was an instrumental figure in the history of the U.S. city of Miami Beach, Florida. Her appearance in publicity photos helped to contribute to the area's early reputation for being a place that a visitor had to see to believe.

During the Florida land boom of the 1920s, pioneering developer Carl G. Fisher worked with fruit farmer John S. Collins to "improve" the barrier island near Miami, Florida which they began to call "Miami Beach". They worked to clear and protect land for development by building the Venetian Islands, a series of artificial islands in north Biscayne Bay.

Collins hired predominantly black work crews from "Colored Town", now known as Overtown, in his orchards and for clearing the mangrove forests on the barrier islands that would become Miami Beach. His crews used imported Asian elephants for pulling stumps and heavy lifting as well as mules and machinery. The black workers who did the work of clearing the mangroves and building solid land in Miami Beach out of a mangrove sandbar were unable to purchase property on the new land because the Lummus brothers' Ocean Beach Realty Company sold lots only to whites, and Fisher's Alton Beach Realty Company sold much bigger and more expensive lots for more expensive luxury homes.

Fisher loved to stage publicity stunts to generate interest in his new development properties. He organized speed boat races in the bay south of Belle Isle, to promote his new Flamingo Hotel. Fisher was attempting to promote Miami Beach as a new luxury resort destination to the wealthy tourists who visited hotels like the Royal Palm Hotel across the bay in Miami, but who shunned the more casual oceanfront casinos operated by Collins.

Fisher acquired a baby elephant, which he named "Rosie". "I'm going to get a million dollars worth of advertising out of this elephant," he said. He featured Rosie as a sort of mascot for the area in publicity photos that promoted Miami Beach as a luxury vacation destination. In 1921 Rosie starred in publicity photos as a "golf caddy" for vacationing president Warren G. Harding, which established Miami Beach as an exotic destination.

Another of Fisher's publicity gimmicks, the Miami Beach bathing beauty, originated at around the same time. "We'll get the prettiest girls and put them in the goddamndest tightest and shortest bathing suits, and no stockings or swim shoes either. We'll have their pictures taken and send them all over the goddamn country!" The controversial photographs, depicting more bared flesh than was considered appropriate at the time, had exactly the desired effect. Property values in Miami Beach soared.

Rosie remained a fixture at press events for Fisher's resort hotels, giving rides to children while another of Fisher's elephants named Baby Carl helped to scoop sand during the construction of the Nautilus Hotel in 1924. She was well-known and widely loved, and apparently survived as late as at least 1938, where she appeared at a party in support of the Miami Beach Committee of One Hundred on Boca Chita Key.

== See also ==
- List of individual elephants
