= Flamingo Hotel, Miami Beach =

Hotel in Miami Beach, Florida, United States

Flamingo Hotel
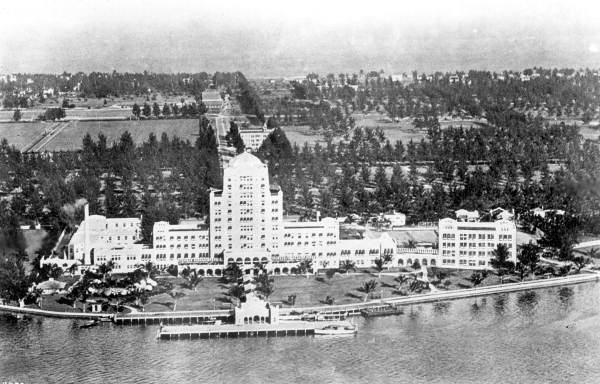
- Aerial view of the Flamingo Hotel in Miami Beach, Florida, c.1922
- Interactive map of the Flamingo Hotel area

General information
- Status: Closed
- Location: Miami Beach, Florida, United States
- Coordinates: 25°47′13″N 80°08′41″W
- Groundbreaking: 1920
- Construction started: 1920
- Topped-out: 1921
- Opening: 1921
- Closed: 1955
- Demolished: 1955

Technical details
- Floor count: 47
- Floor area: 420 m^{2} (4,500 sq ft)

Design and construction
- Architect: Rubush & Hunter
- Developer: Carl G. Fisher Cecel G. Fowler

Other information
- Number of suites: 1,117
- Number of restaurants: 1
- Parking: 669

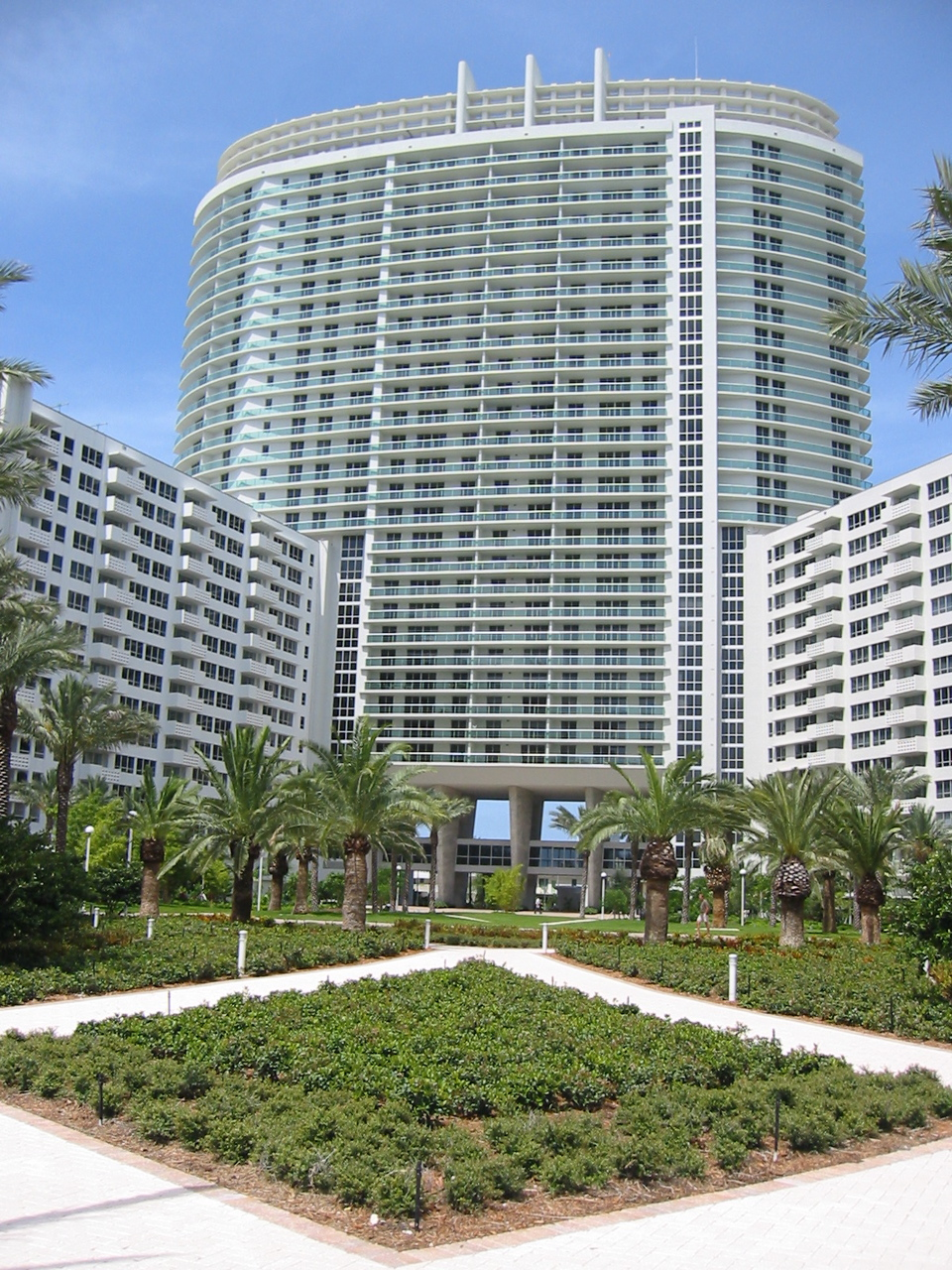
The Flamingo South Beach apartments as seen from the Biscayne Bay seawall, 7 July 2003

The Flamingo Hotel overlooked Biscayne Bay on the west side of the newly formed city of Miami Beach, Florida, until the 1950s, when it was torn down to make room for the new Morton Towers development, which is now known as the Flamingo South Beach.

== History ==
The hotel was built by pioneering Miami Beach developer Carl G. Fisher in 1920, designed by Rubush & Hunter of Indianapolis, and opened in 1921. An adjoining golf course was designed by Captain H.C. Tippet. Fisher was determined to avoid the ocean-side beaches where his development partner John S. Collins had established a casino. He saw the smooth waters of Biscayne Bay as the perfect place for a boat racing spectacle, as an attraction for wealthy and refined tourists. The automobile racing promoter established the Biscayne Bay Speed Boat Regattas near Belle Isle as a publicity draw for his large new hotel. He would continue to stoke the exotic vacation destination image that drove the land boom in the area with stunts like his publicity photos with his elephant Rosie. The Flamingo site overlooks Flagler Monument Island in Biscayne Bay.

In 1935, despite a reservation by the New York Giants baseball team, Jewish players Phil Weintraub and Harry Danning were refused entry to the hotel, which had a "No Jews" policy. However, the hotel backed down and allowed them to stay when Giants manager Bill Terry threatened to move the team to another hotel.
