= Belle Isle (Miami Beach) =

Coordinates: 25.791193°N 80.148112°W

- Neighborhood of Miami Beach
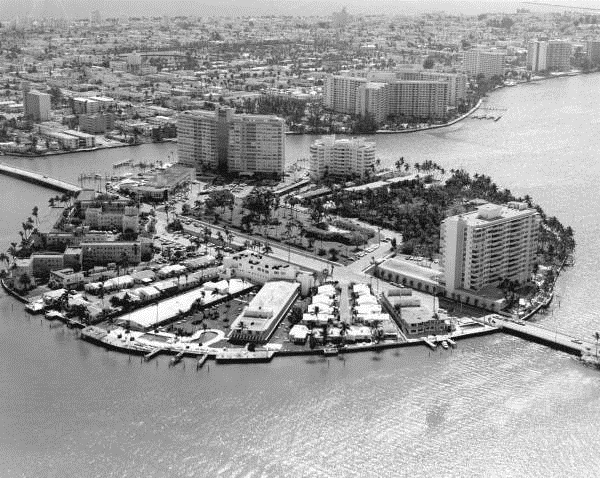
- Belle Isle and the Venetian Causeway, c. 1960s
- Nickname: Bull Isle (historic name)
- Interactive map of Belle Isle
- Country: United States
- State: Florida
- County: Miami-Dade County
- City: Miami Beach

Government
  - Miami Beach Mayor: Steven Meiner
  - Miami-Dade County Commissioner: Bruno Barreiro
  - House of Representatives: Cynthia A. Stafford (D)
  - State Senate: Gwen Margolis (D)
  - U.S. House: Donna Shalala (D)
- Elevation: 3 ft (0.91 m)

Population (2010)
  - Total: 1,755
- Time zone: UTC-05 (EST)
- ZIP Code: 33139
- Area codes: 305, 786

Belle Isle is a neighborhood in the city of Miami Beach on an island in Biscayne Bay, Florida, United States. It is the easternmost of the Venetian Islands, a chain of artificial islands in Biscayne Bay in the cities of Miami and Miami Beach. It is home to apartment buildings, a portion of the Venetian Causeway, a city of Miami Beach park, and a hotel. It is between Rivo Alto Island and the main barrier island of Miami Beach.

== History ==
Belle Isle was originally called "Bull Isle", and was later renamed. Unlike the other Venetian Islands, Belle Isle is not completely artificial. Like the Sunset Islands, Belle Isle was originally a rough mangrove hammock island sitting in north Biscayne Bay near the Miami barrier islands, before the use of the term "Miami Beach".

Before fruit farmer John S. Collins partnered with the wealthy investor Carl G. Fisher to build the Collins Bridge from Miami in 1913, the new luxury properties under development in Miami Beach and Collins' large avocado orchards were inaccessible except by ferry boat. When Collins dug the Collins Canal, work crews deposited dredged sand around the rough island at the mouth of the canal, increasing its land mass and defining its shape. The "improved" island, now cleared of mangroves and platted into small parcels of land for single-family homes, extended into Biscayne Bay and allowed Collins and Fisher to build a relatively short wooden bridge across the bay by running the road over Belle Isle. The gateway to Miami Beach earned a reputation as an enclave for fashionable millionaires, such as Joseph H. Adams, whose sprawling estate occupied the southeast corner of the island.

During the Florida land boom of the 1920s, Belle Isle and Fisher's nearby Flamingo Hotel were the site of the Biscayne Bay Speed Boat Regattas. Fisher had successfully promoted automobile races in Indianapolis, and he used his skills to stage gasoline-powered speed boat races in the smooth waters of Biscayne Bay just south of Belle Isle to attract tourists.

In 1942, the University of Miami turned a boat house on the Joseph H. Adams estate into the first Marine Lab for the Rosenstiel School of Marine, Atmospheric, and Earth Science. Belle Isle was also the site of the All Souls Episcopal Church as late as 1947.

On January 24, 2018, the Belle Isle Court Apartments the three-story apartment building built in 1939, was demolished. A new development will be built on the property at 31 Venetian Way on Belle Isle, Miami Beach.

== Community ==
The Belle Isle Residents Association was established in December, 2004. Board meets approximately 6 times per year. General Membership Meetings are called as needed at a minimum of once a year. The association's mission is to "enhance the quality of life for the residents of Belle Isle", specifically regarding "security, traffic control, ease of parking, noise control, park beautification, cleanliness, open spaces, planning, development, licensing, permitting, and all issues that may affect the residents and their quality of life on Belle Isle".

=== Renovations ===
Belle Isle Park, in the center of Belle Isle, underwent a renovation project in 2006, including sidewalks, lighting and landscape improvements, picnic areas, and a dog park. A streetscape improvement project for the Venetian bridges was planned for 2008 and 2009.

=== Parking ===
Parking was free on Island Avenue on Belle Isle until 2005, when residents petitioned the city of Miami Beach to create a new residential parking zone in order to ensure parking for residents after the opening of the Standard Hotel. Island Avenue is now a residential parking zone, and you must buy a permit for Zone 14. Belle Isle residents can purchase a one-year residential decal or one visitor permit hang tag per household.

== See also ==
- Biscayne Island – Original site of Viking Airport.
- Collins Bridge – The first bridge from Miami to Miami Beach, which ran over Bull/Belle Isle.
- Flagler Monument Island – Site of an obelisk monument to Henry M. Flagler.
- Flamingo Hotel, Miami Beach – Carl G. Fisher's famous luxury hotel near Belle Isle.
- Isola di Lolando – A failed Venetian Island construction project.
- Venetian Causeway – The modern replacement for the Collins Bridge, which today runs over Belle Isle.
