= Venetian Islands, Florida =

Venetian Islands
- Neighborhood of Miami
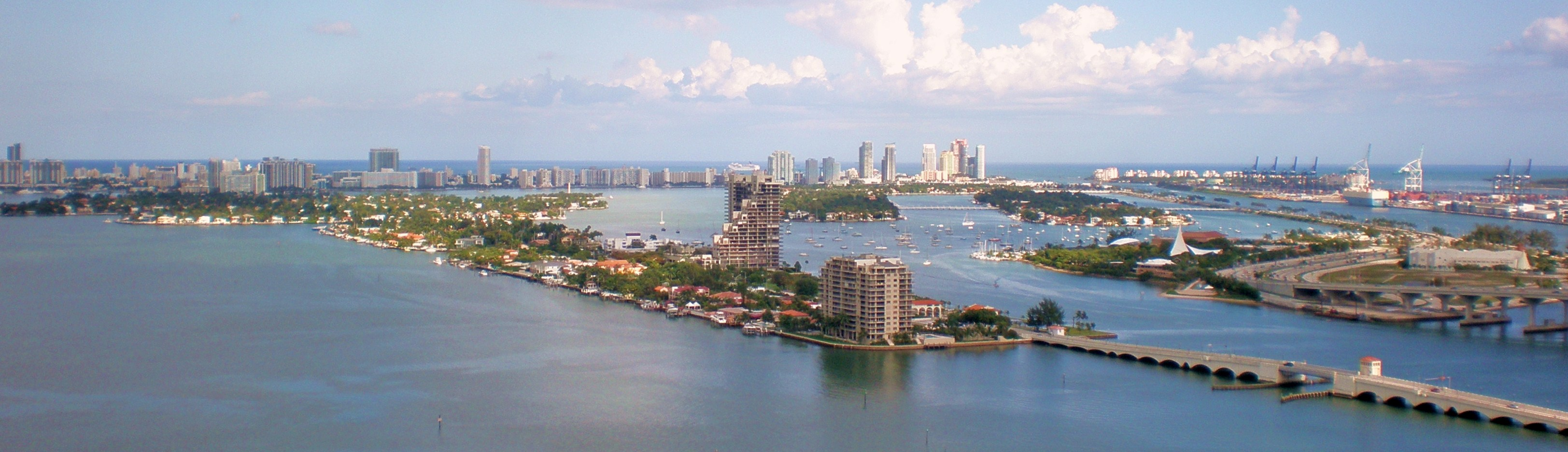
- View of the Venetian Causeway and Venetian Islands with South Beach in the background, as seen from the Arts & Entertainment District neighborhood

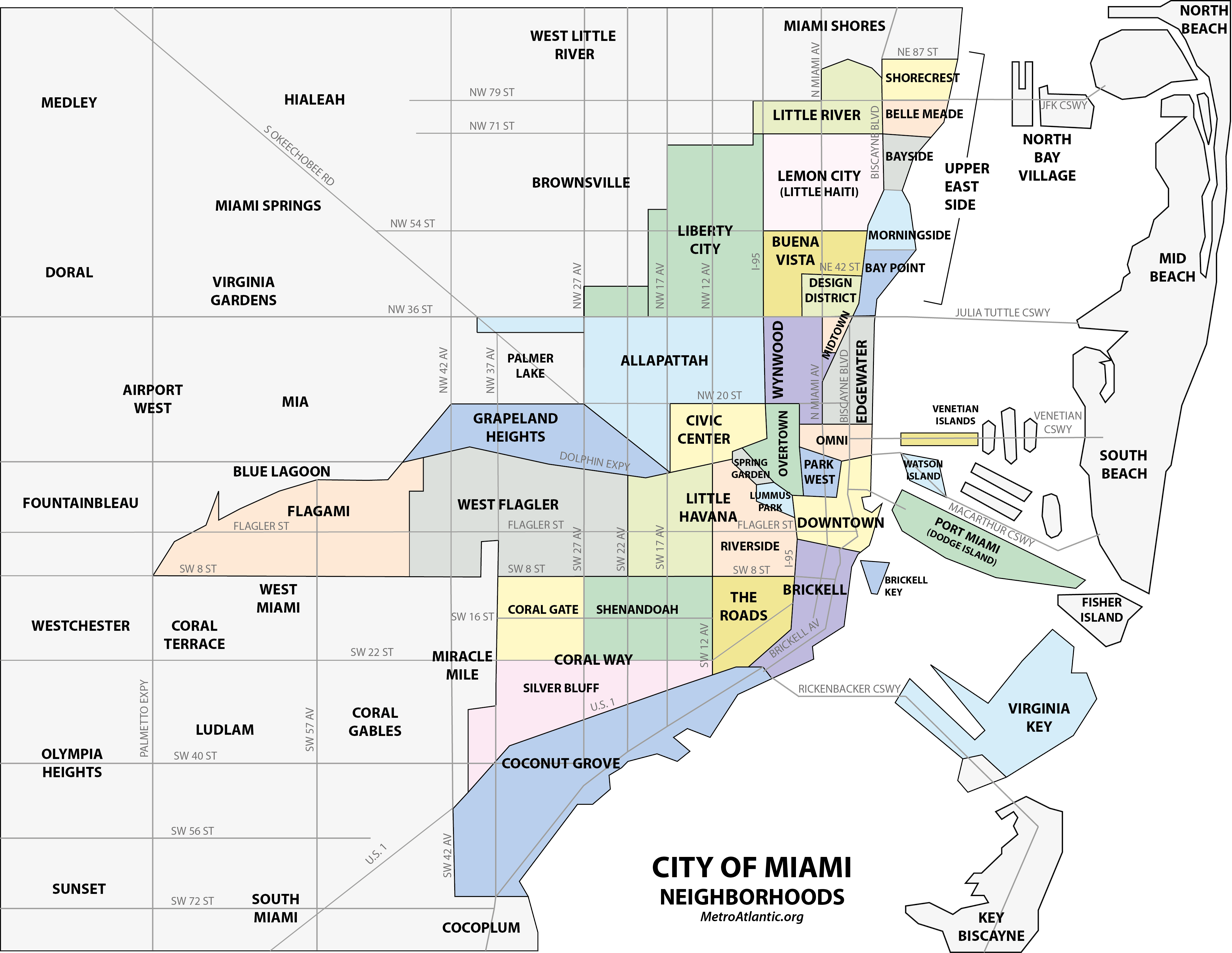
- Venetian Islands neighborhood within the City of Miami
- Coordinates: 25°47′26.99″N 80°9′39.51″W
- Country: United States
- State: Florida
- County: Miami-Dade County
- City: Miami
- Islands of the Venetians Islands: Islands list: Belle Isle; Biscayne Island; Di Lido Island; Flagler Monument Island; Rivo Alto Island; San Marco Island; San Marino Island

Government
  - City of Miami Commissioner: Ken Russell
  - Miami-Dade Commissioners: Audrey Edmonson
  - House of Representatives: Vicki Lopez (R)
  - State Senate: Ileana Garcia (R)
  - U.S. House: Maria Elvira Salazar (R)
- Time zone: UTC-05 (EST)
- ZIP Code: 33139
- Area codes: 305, 786

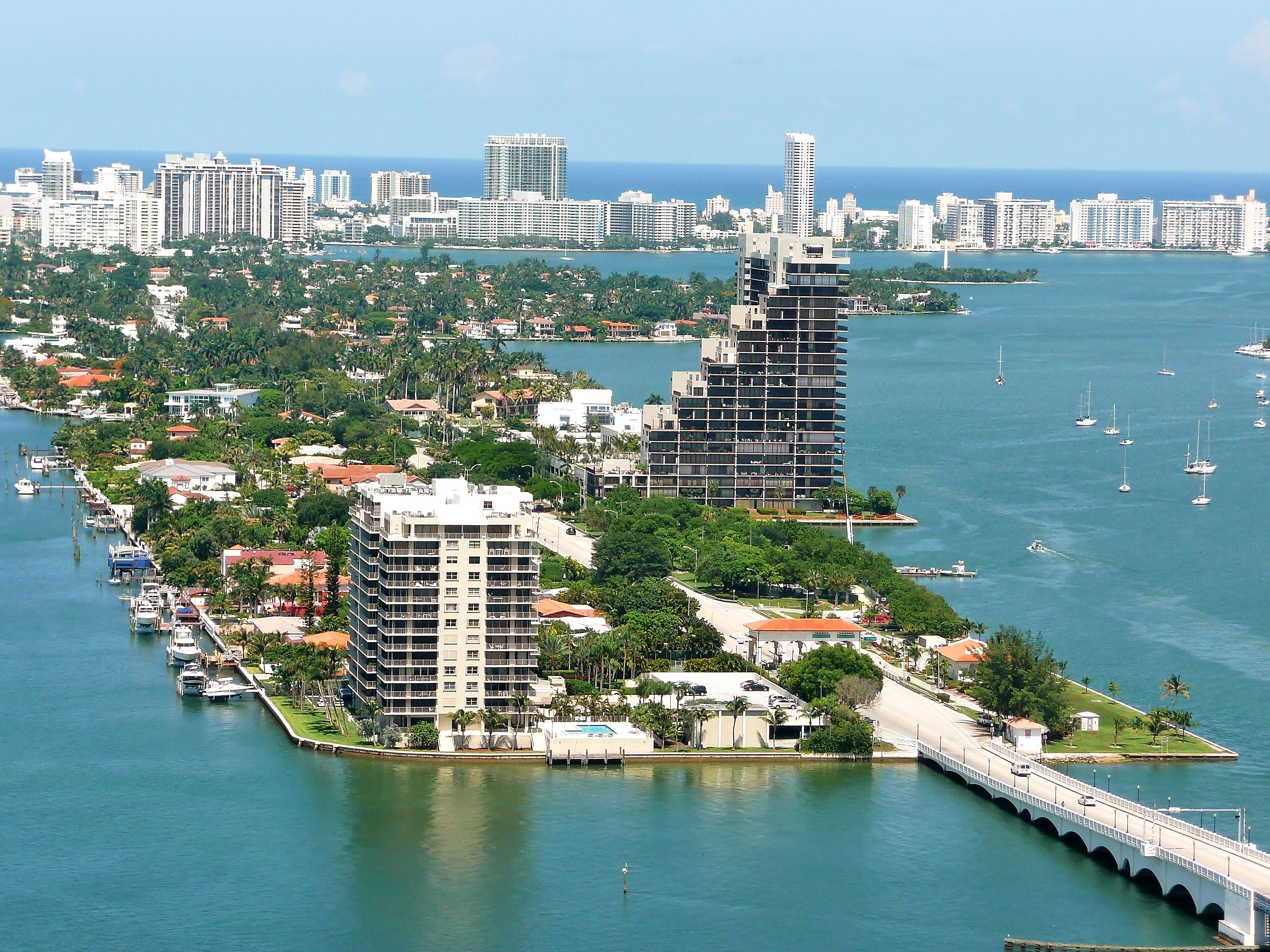
Aerial view of the westernmost Venetian Islands from the Arts & Entertainment District

The Venetian Islands are a chain of artificial islands in Biscayne Bay in the cities of Miami and Miami Beach, Florida. The islands are, from west to east: Biscayne Island (Miami), San Marco Island (Miami), San Marino Island (Miami Beach), Di Lido Island (Miami Beach), Rivo Alto Island (Miami Beach), and Belle Isle (Miami Beach). Flagler Monument Island remains an uninhabited picnic island, originally built in 1920 as a memorial to railroad pioneer Henry Flagler. The islands are connected by bridges from the Miami mainland to Miami Beach.

== History ==
The Venetian Islands project was proposed to be much larger than what exists today. Another causeway was to be built, called "The Drive of the Campanili." The causeway would connect Hibiscus Island (south of the Venetian Islands) with Di Lido Island. The road would then continue north right up the center of Biscayne Bay, with five new islands created along its path. The roadway would then veer slightly to the northeast, where it would end at Indian Creek Village. An additional four islands would be built along two east-west roads that would connect with the causeway. One of these roads was along the current route of the Julia Tuttle Causeway and the other along the current route of the 79th Street Causeway.

The original bridge (called the Collins Bridge) was built by farmer and developer John S. Collins with financial assistance from automotive parts and racing pioneer Carl G. Fisher. At the time it was completed, it was the longest wooden bridge in the world. The 2½ mile wooden toll bridge opened on June 12, 1913, providing a critical link to the newly established city of Miami Beach, formerly accessible only by a ferry service.

While none of these islands were built, the foundation pillings for one of them can still be seen in Central Biscayne Bay between Di Lido Island and the Julia Tuttle Causeway. The island was to be called Isola di Lolando. The demise of the island construction was due to a combination of the aftermath of the 1926 Miami Hurricane and the end of the Florida land boom of the 1920s. The Shoreland Company went bankrupt in 1927 due to objections of "further mutilation of the waterway".

The original wooden causeway was replaced in 1925 by a series of arch drawbridges and renamed the Venetian Causeway. Today, the causeway is a popular stretch for people to jog, ride bikes, walk dogs and stroll. The islands offer residents a suburb feel that is located between (and within minutes of) Miami Beach's South Beach and Miami's Adrienne Arsht Center for the Performing Arts.

== Biscayne Island ==
Biscayne Island is a neighborhood in the City of Miami, Florida, United States. It is also the westernmost of the Venetian Islands, a chain of artificial islands in Biscayne Bay. During the 1930s, the island was used as an airport known as Viking Airport, with a hangar, 2,600-foot sod runway and seaplane ramps; the airport was closed by 1937 and residential development began in the 1940s. The island is now home to apartment buildings, residential neighborhoods, and a toll plaza portion of the Venetian Causeway.

=== Demographics ===
As of 2000, the population of Biscayne Island had 412 people. The zip code for Biscayne Island is 33139. The area covers 0.181 square miles (0.47 km^{2}). As of 2000, there were 215 males and 197 females. The median age for males were 42.1 years old, while the median age for females were 48.0 years old. The average household size had 1.6 people, while the average family size had 2.4 members. The percentage of married-couple families (among all households) was 28.8%, while the percentage of married-couple families with children (among all households) was 4.0%, and the percentage of single-mother households (among all households) was 0.8%. The percentage of never-married males 15 years old and over was 19.6%, while the percentage of never-married females 15 years old and over was 14.6%.

As of 2000, the percentage of people that speak English not well or not at all made up 6.9% of the population. The percentage of residents born in Florida was 24.8%, the percentage of people born in another U.S. state was 24.8%, and the percentage of native residents but born outside the U.S. was 4.7%, while the percentage of foreign born residents was 45.7%.

== San Marco Island ==
San Marco Island is a neighborhood in the City of Miami, Florida, United States. It is the 2nd westernmost of the Venetian Islands, a chain of artificial islands in Biscayne Bay. It is between Biscayne Island and San Marino Island. It contains upscale houses and the Venetian Causeway.

== Education ==
The local school district for the entire county is Miami-Dade County Public Schools. Zoned schools for the Venetian Islands include:

- North Beach Elementary School
- Nautilus Middle School
- Miami Beach High School
