= Venetian Causeway =

Bridge in Miami-Dade County, Florida, Florida, United States

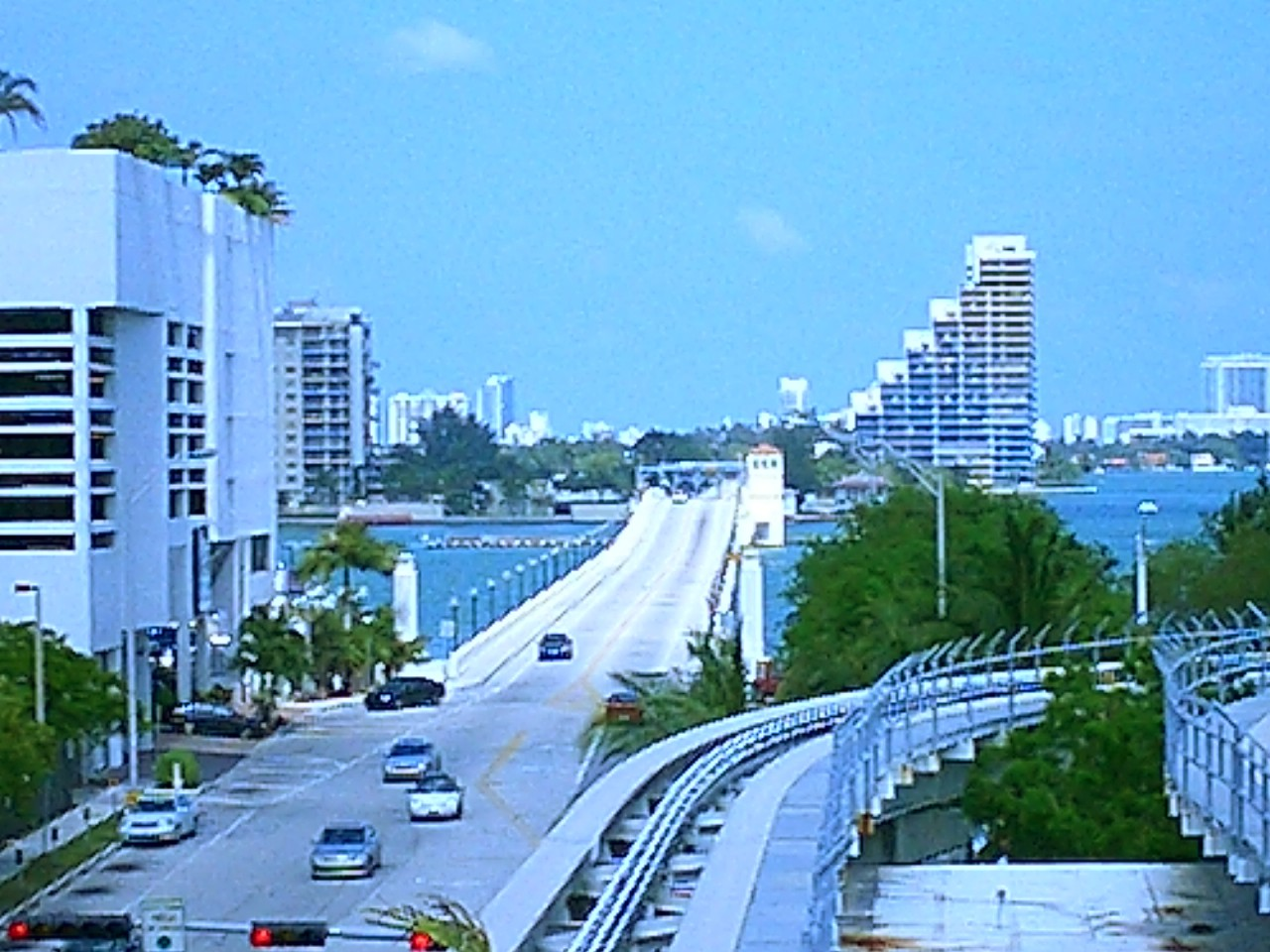
- Venetian Causeway from Downtown Miami, east toward Miami Beach in 2002
- Coordinates: 25°47′28″N 80°09′54″W
- Crosses: Biscayne Bay
- Locale: Miami to Miami Beach
- Maintained by: MDX
- Heritage status: NRHP (1989)
- Preceded by: Collins Bridge

Characteristics
- Design: Bascule
- Total length: 2.8 miles (4.5 km)
- Longest span: 0.4 miles (0.64 km)

History
- Designer: Harvey Stanley, Raymond Concrete Pile Co.
- Opened: 1925 (original causeway & bridges); 1999 (current bridges)

Statistics
- Toll: $3.25 (SunPass)
- Venetian Causeway
- U.S. National Register of Historic Places
- NRHP reference No.: 89000852
- Added to NRHP: July 13, 1989

Location
- Interactive map of Venetian Causeway

The Venetian Causeway crosses Biscayne Bay between Miami on the mainland and Miami Beach on a barrier island in the Miami metropolitan area. The man-made Venetian Islands and non-bridge portions of the causeway were created by materials which came from the dredging of the bay. The Venetian Causeway follows the original route of the Collins Bridge, a wooden 2.5 mi (4 km) long structure built in 1913 by John S. Collins and Carl G. Fisher which opened up the barrier island for unprecedented growth and development.

The causeway has one toll plaza (administered by the Miami-Dade County Public Works department) on Biscayne Island, the westernmost Venetian Island. The toll for an automobile is US$3.00.

The causeway has two bascule bridges. At the Downtown/Western Beginning of the causeway travelers are greeted by two columns vertically saying "VENETIAN WAY" along with a sign indicating that there is a weight limit .

At the South Beach/Eastern Terminus, drivers must choose whether to go north onto Dade Boulevard or eastbound onto 17th Street to Ocean Drive, Collins Ave/A1A, Lincoln Road, City Hall, The Convention Center, Jackie Gleason Theater and the beach .

The Venetian Causeway was listed in the National Register of Historic Places in 1989. It was re-dedicated in 1999 after the completion of a $29 million restoration and replacement project.

In 2023 Miami-Dade County initiated a plan to replace the 11 original bridges along the causeway with higher structures.

A popular use of the causeway is for exercising, including both jogging and bicycling.

Thoroughbred racehorse Venetian Way, best known for winning the 1960 Kentucky Derby, was named after the causeway.

== See also ==
- Belle Isle
- Collins Bridge
- Di Lido Island
- Biscayne Island
- Rivo Alto Island
- John S. Collins
- Carl G. Fisher

== Gallery ==
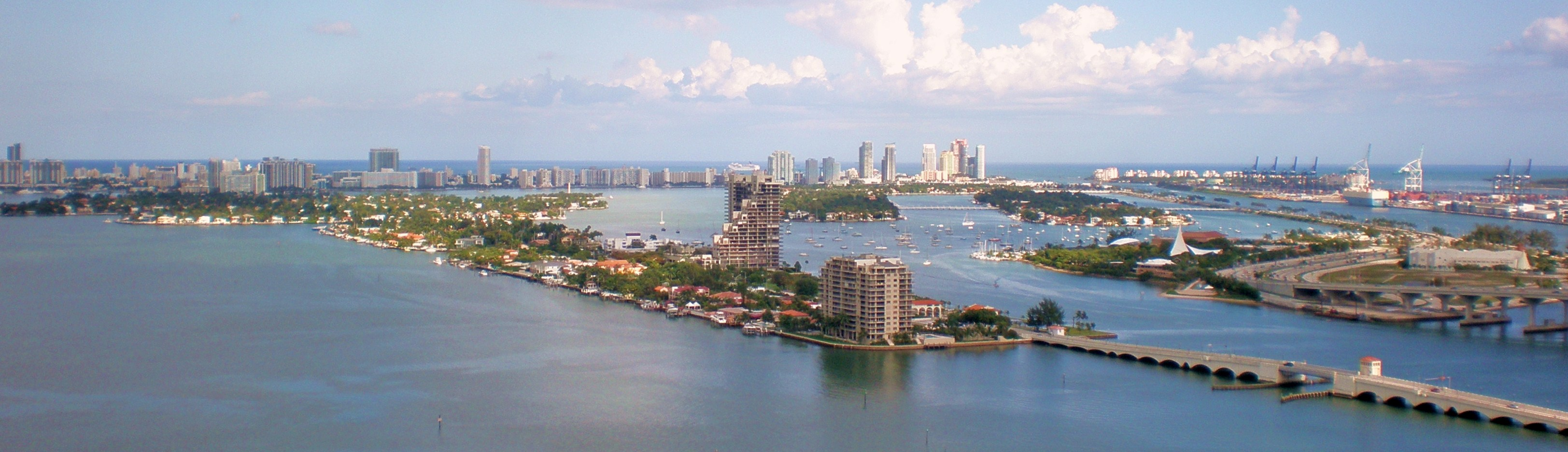
View of the Venetian Causeway and islands with South Beach in the background, as seen from the 1800 Club in Downtown Miami

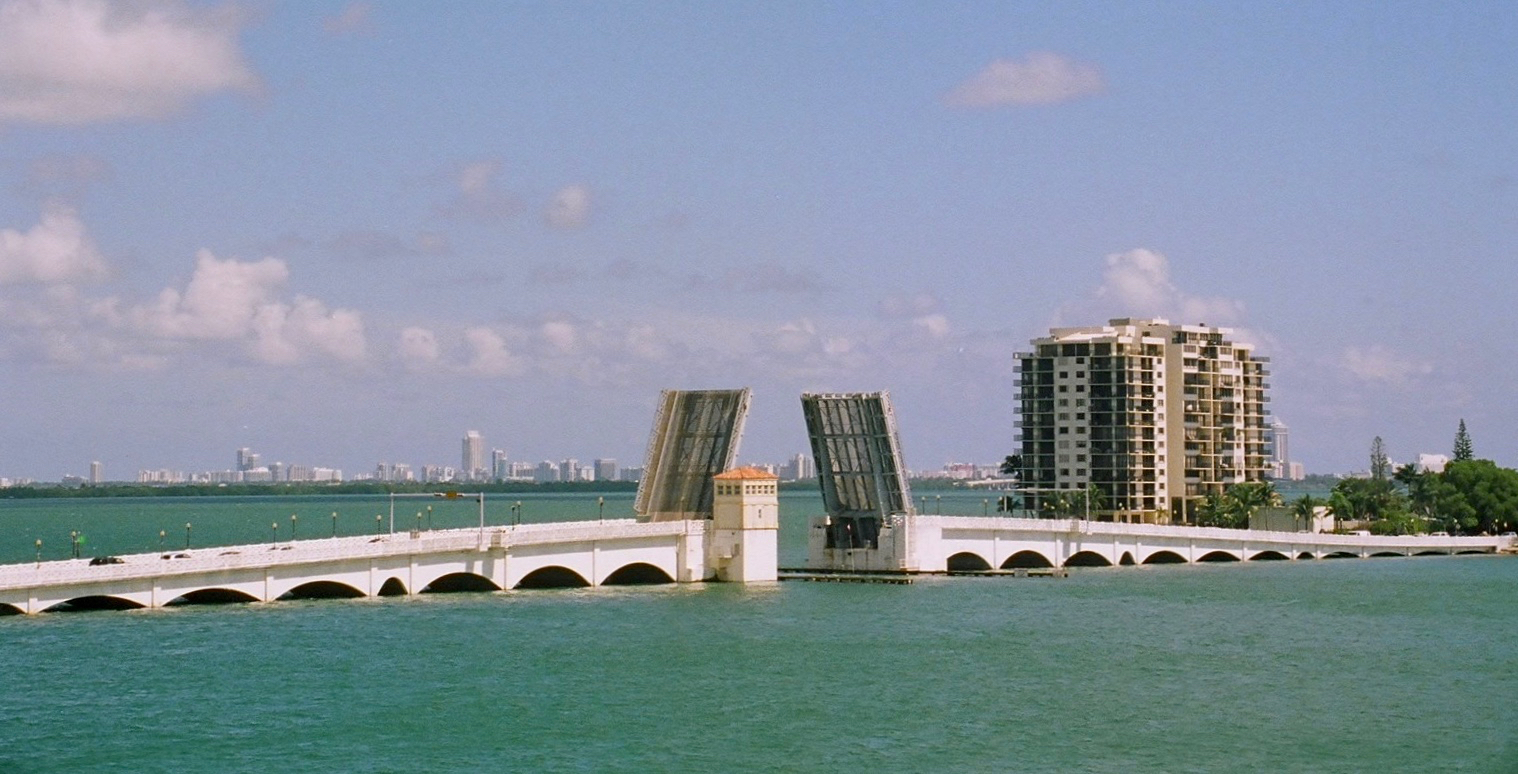
The westernmost of the two drawbridges on the causeway, with its draw span opened for a boat

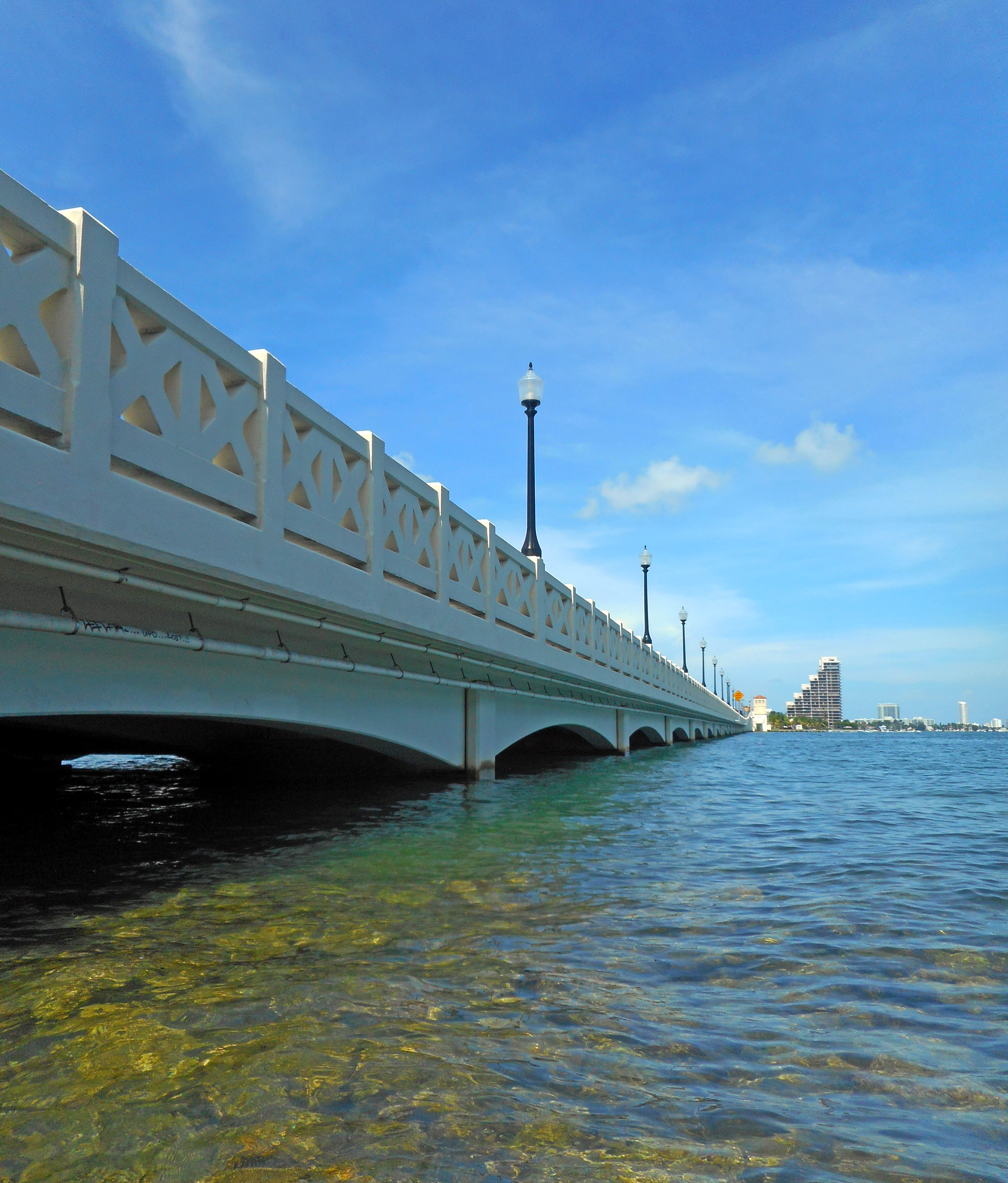
View from water level towards Miami Beach

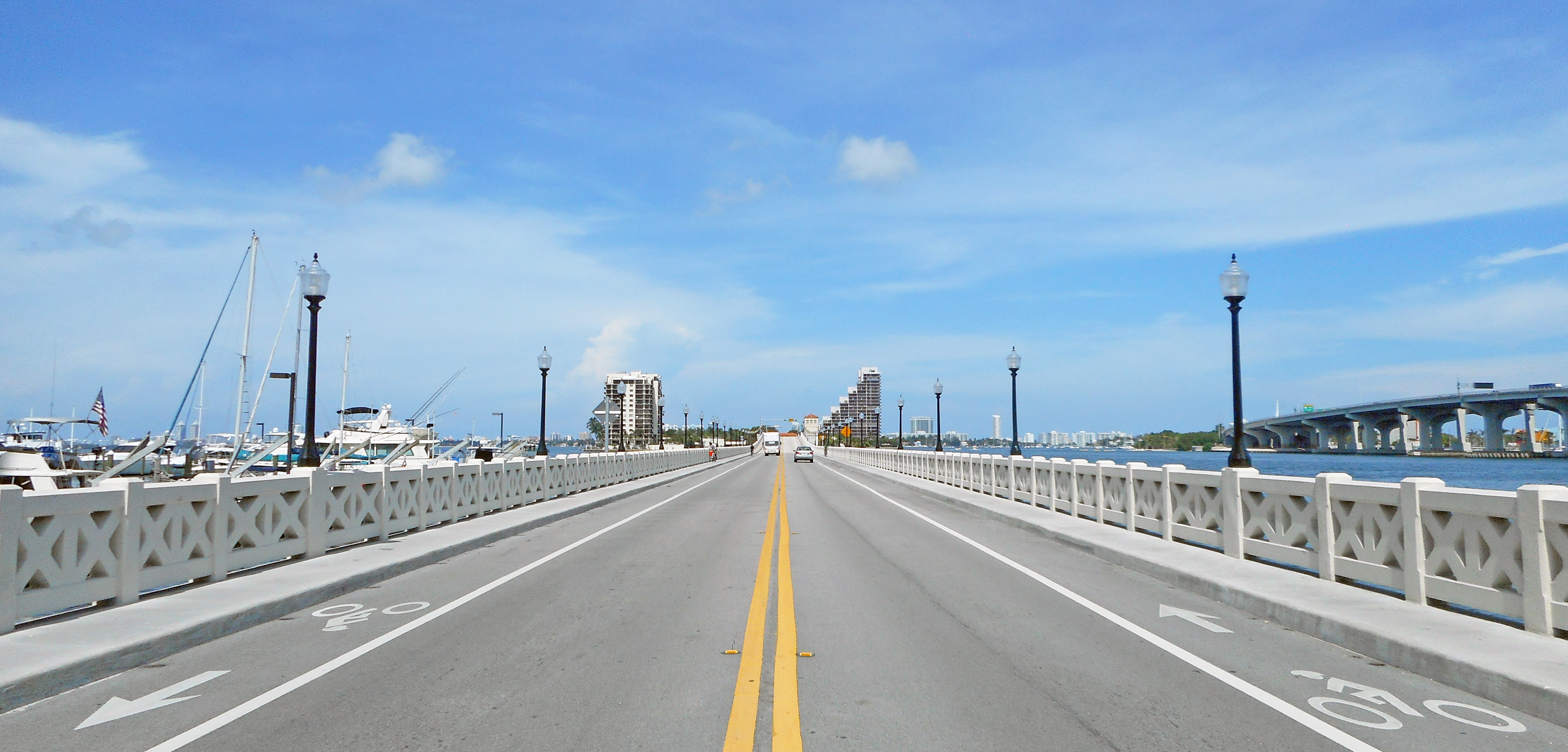
View towards Miami Beach

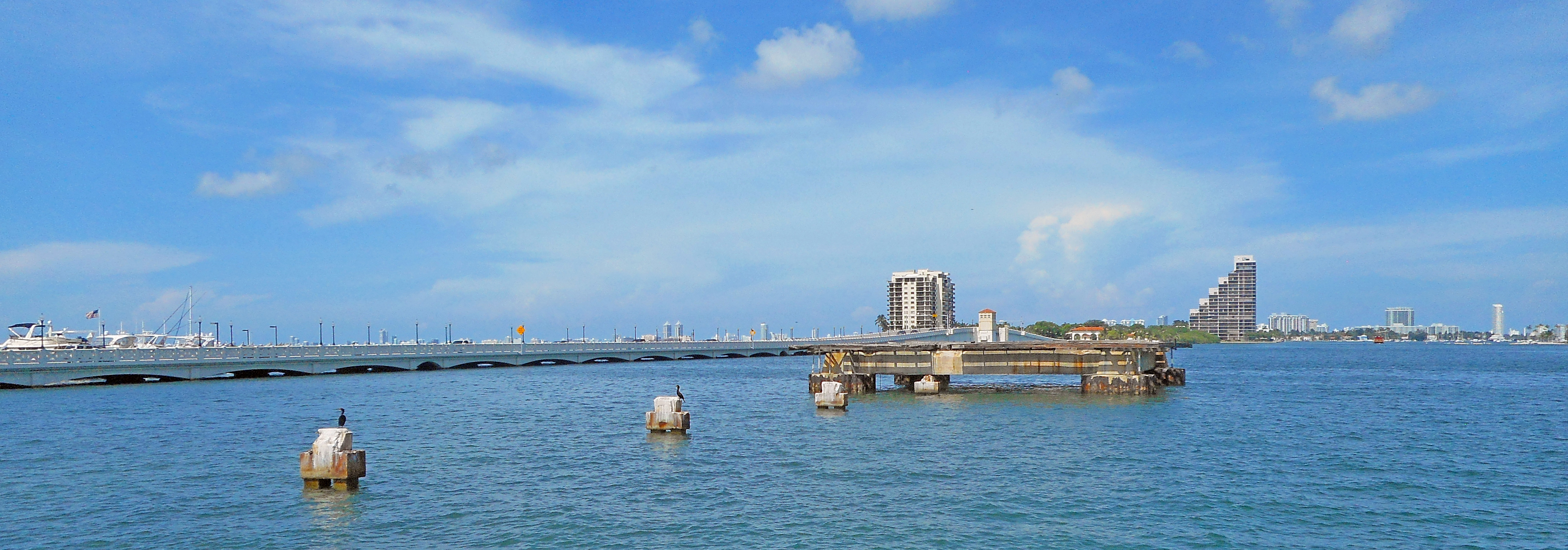
The Venetian Causeway viewed from former site of The Miami Herald

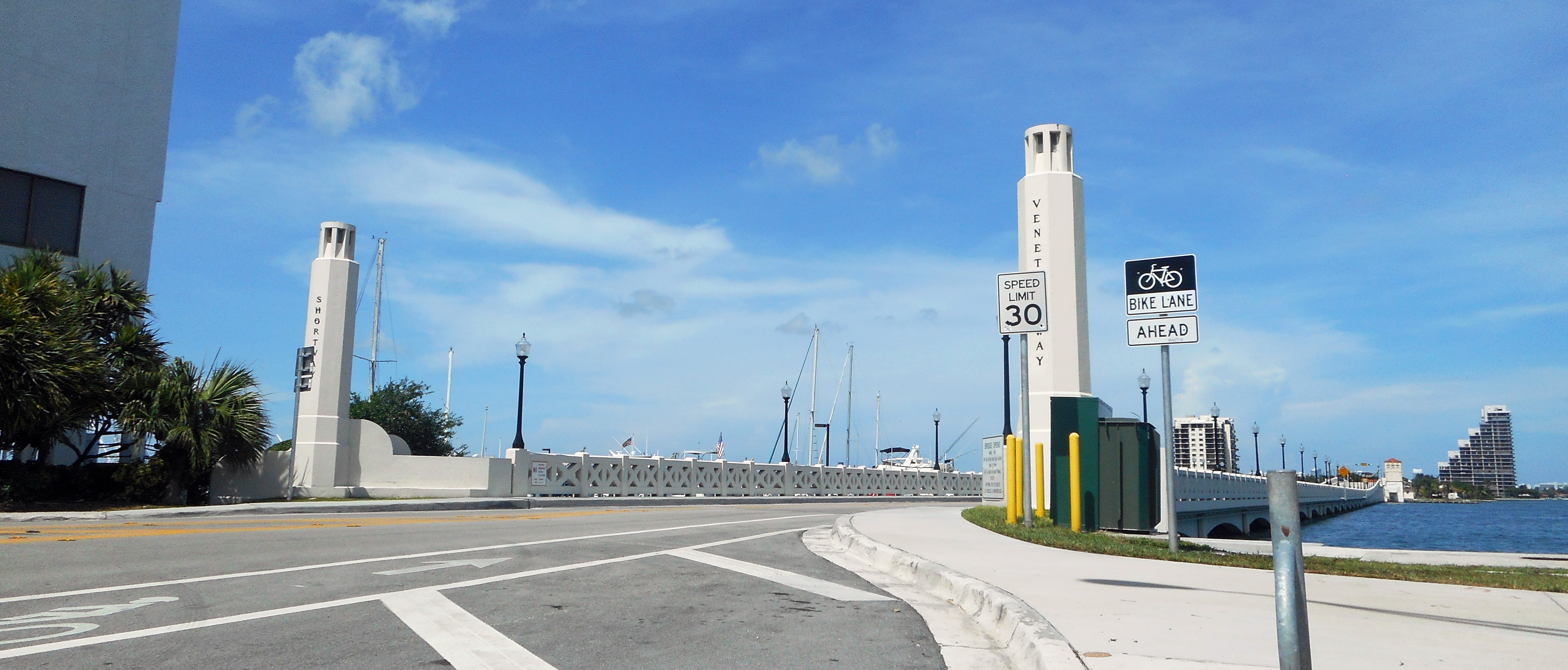
Entrance to Venetian Causeway from Miami side

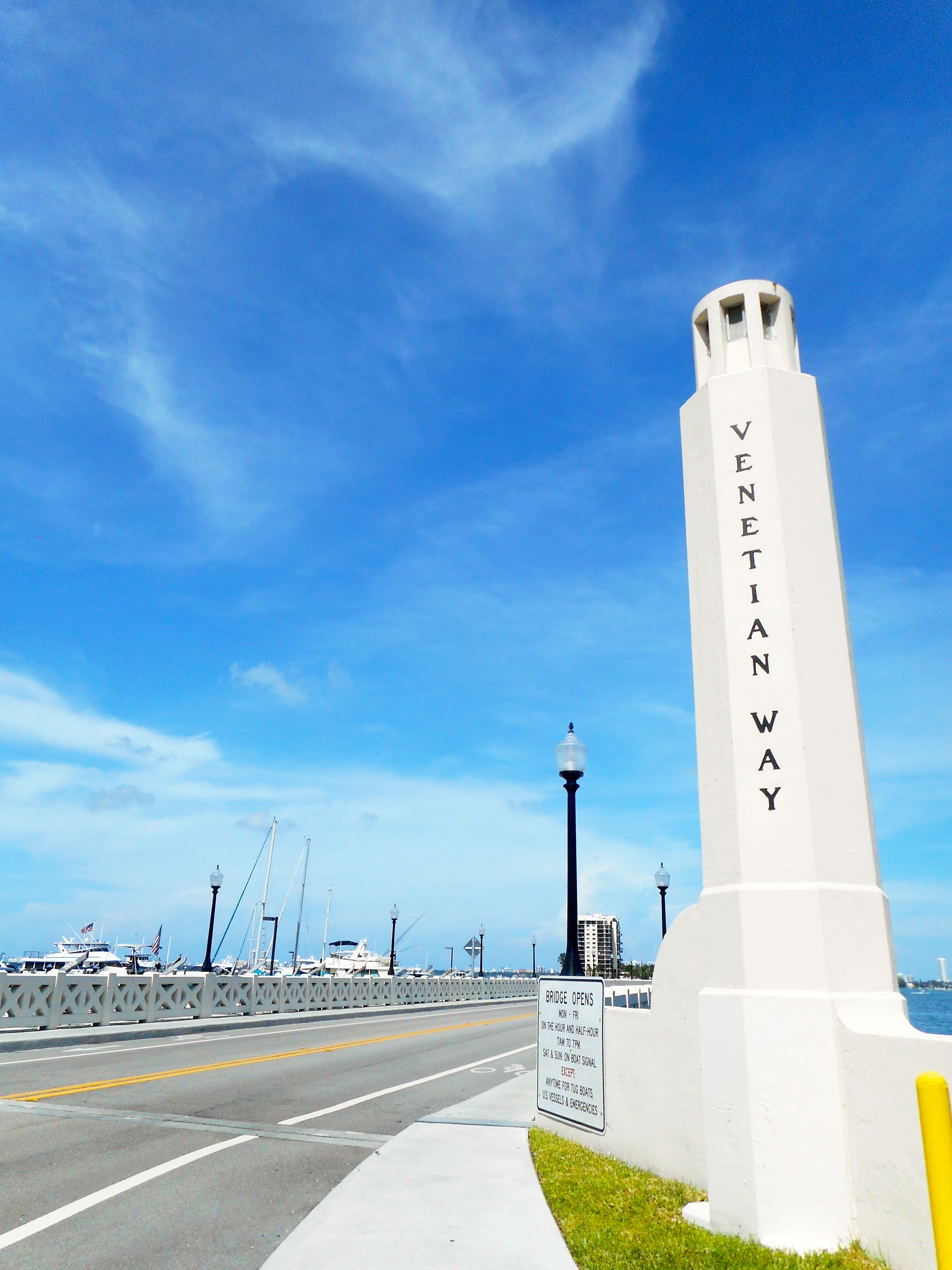
Column with Sign

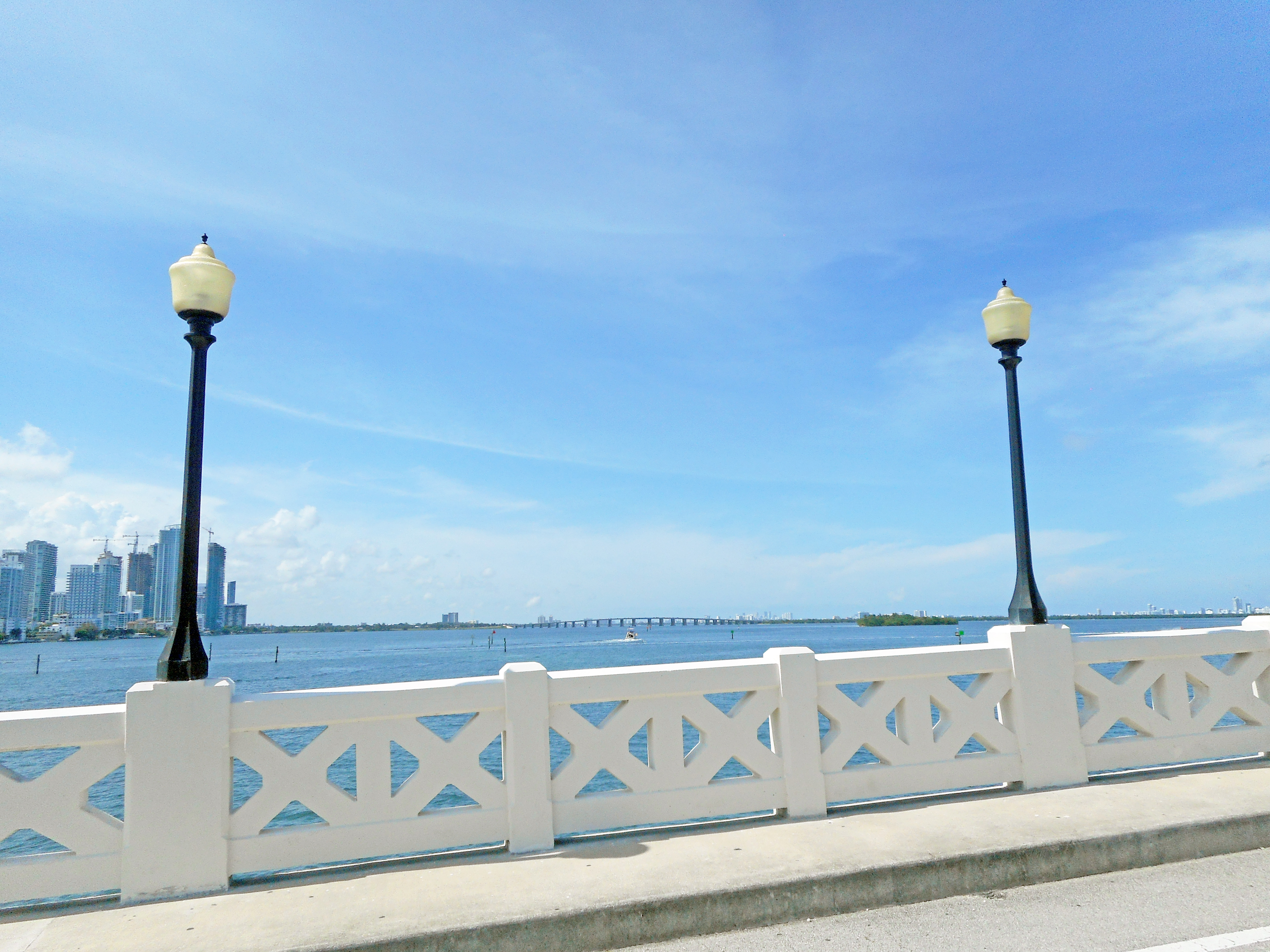
Bridge detail, lamps and railing

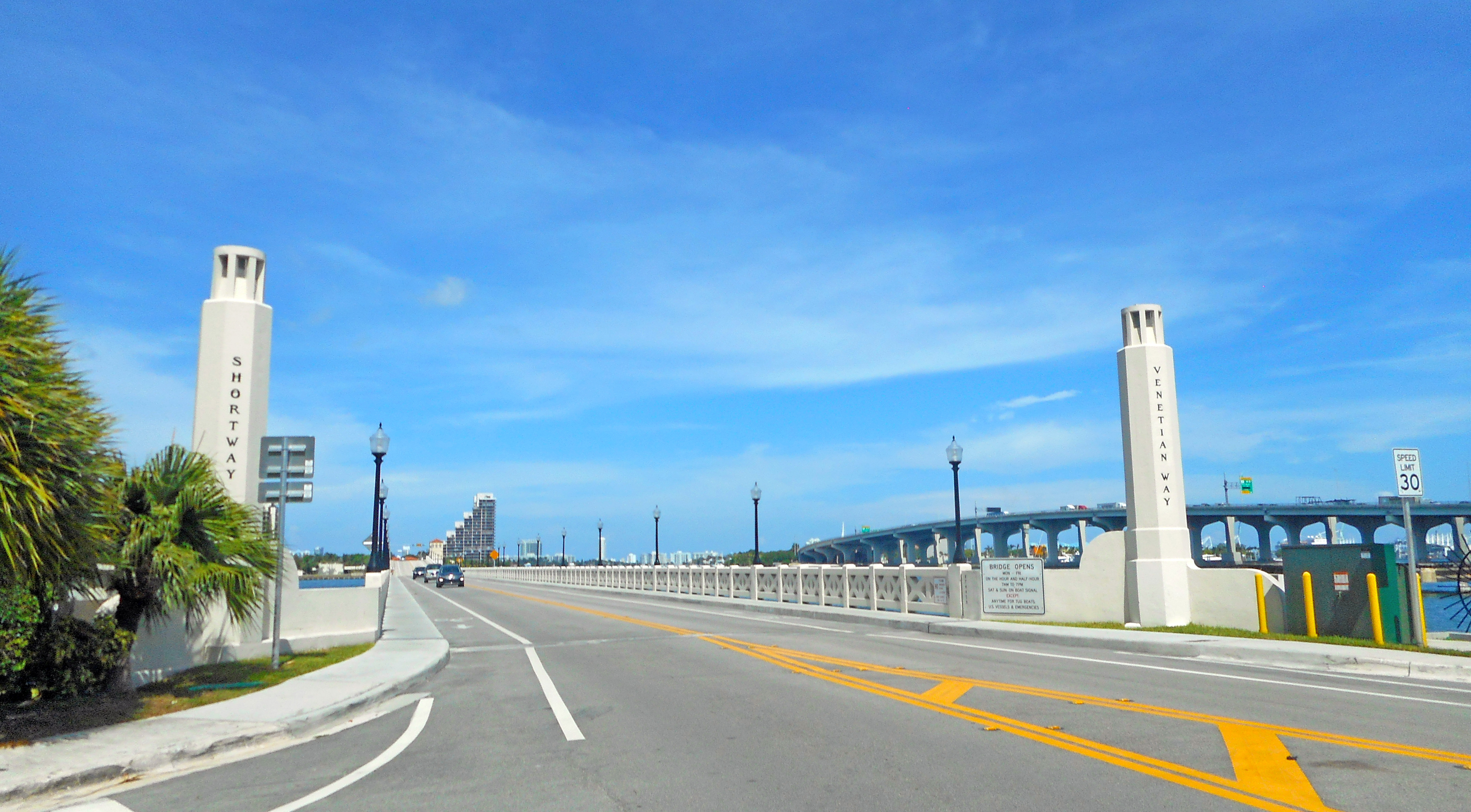
Entrance to Venetian Causeway with Columns view towards southeast
