= Isola di Lolando =

Artificial island in Florida, United States

- Pilings from the Lolando Island sea wall

- Isola di Lolando Isola di Lolando (North Atlantic)

Geography
- Location: North Atlantic
- Coordinates: 25.8043°N 80.1584°W

Administration
- United States
- County: Miami-Dade

Pilings from the Lolando Island sea wall, with Belle Isle, Rivo Alto Island, and Di Lido Island visible in the background.

Isola di Lolando is an unfinished artificial island in Biscayne Bay, Florida. Hurricane damage from the 1926 Miami hurricane, as well as the economic downturn that heralded the Great Depression, caused the project to be abandoned shortly after the start of construction, but pilings remain visible in the bay and are a hazard to navigation.

== History ==
In the early 1920s, audacious developers like John S. Collins were known for selling pre-construction property in the middle of Biscayne Bay before the islands had even been built. Demand was strong and there was virtually no environmental regulation, leading developers to envision filling Biscayne Bay with artificial islands. With unlimited waterfront property available, it seemed that the land boom had no end in sight.

The Shoreland Company and The Venetian Island Company were attempting to build a chain of new Venetian Islands in the water south of the Julia Tuttle Causeway in north Biscayne Bay. The first was to stretch from the causeway to Di Lido Island, and was to be called Isola di Lolando, continuing the Venetian theme of the existing successful artificial island projects.

In 1925 the population explosion in South Florida had begun to strain local resources, and railway shipping companies began raising prices. In October the old Danish war ship Prinz Valdemar capsized in the channel in the port of Miami on its way to becoming a floating hotel, blocking shipping access to Miami for weeks. That summer brought the 1926 Miami Hurricane, which devastated an unprepared populace and heavily damaged local infrastructure. The Shoreland Company went bankrupt in 1927 amid objections to "further mutilation of the waterway". The 1929 stock market crash and subsequent onset of the Great Depression ensured that Lolando Island was never completed.

A Miami real estate bubble burst in the mid-1920s as a land boom fueled by outside speculators was stricken by economic realities and unexpected hurricanes. One failed development project left its remains scarring north Biscayne Bay near Miami Beach, Florida. Concrete pilings from the sea wall of the incomplete Isola di Lolando still remain perfectly aligned in the shape of a new "Venetian island", stretching from the northern tip of Di Lido Island to the Julia Tuttle Causeway.

The pilings sit in about 5–10 feet of water and extend about 5–10 feet above the water, depending on the tide. The pilings and the island's outline shape are clearly visible from the Julia Tuttle Causeway as well as from many of the tall buildings that overlook the bay. They present a clear hazard to boat navigation and the interior of the island is a peaceful place that remains free of boat and jet ski traffic for kayakers, dolphin, manatee, sting rays, manta rays, and many types of fish.

Though faint, the island's pilings and outline can still be seen from space, via Google Earth and Google Maps, and from Yahoo Maps.

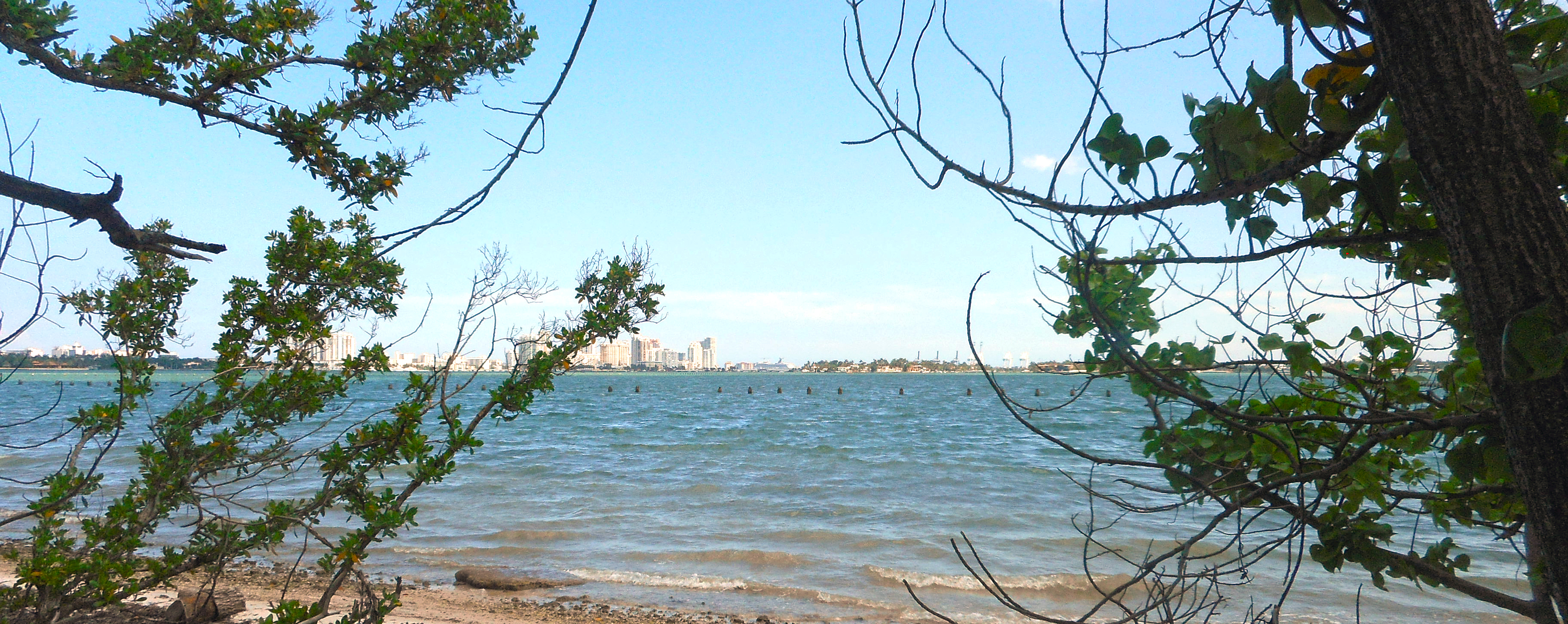
Isola di Lolando piling ruins seen from Julia Tuttle Causeway
