= Langlütjen =

Two artificial German islands

Coordinates: 53°33′26″N 8°30′58″E

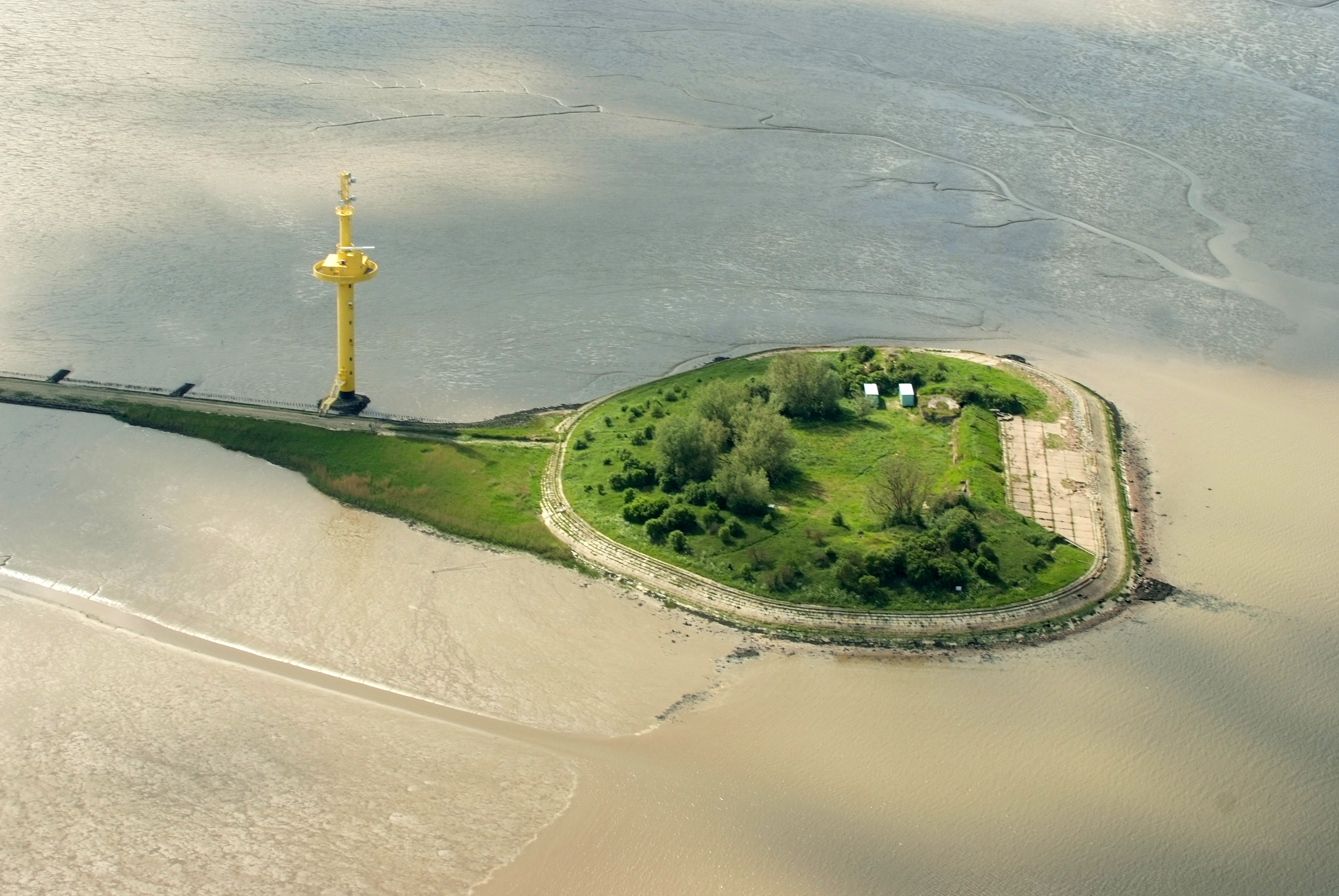
Aerial view of Langlütjen I (2012)

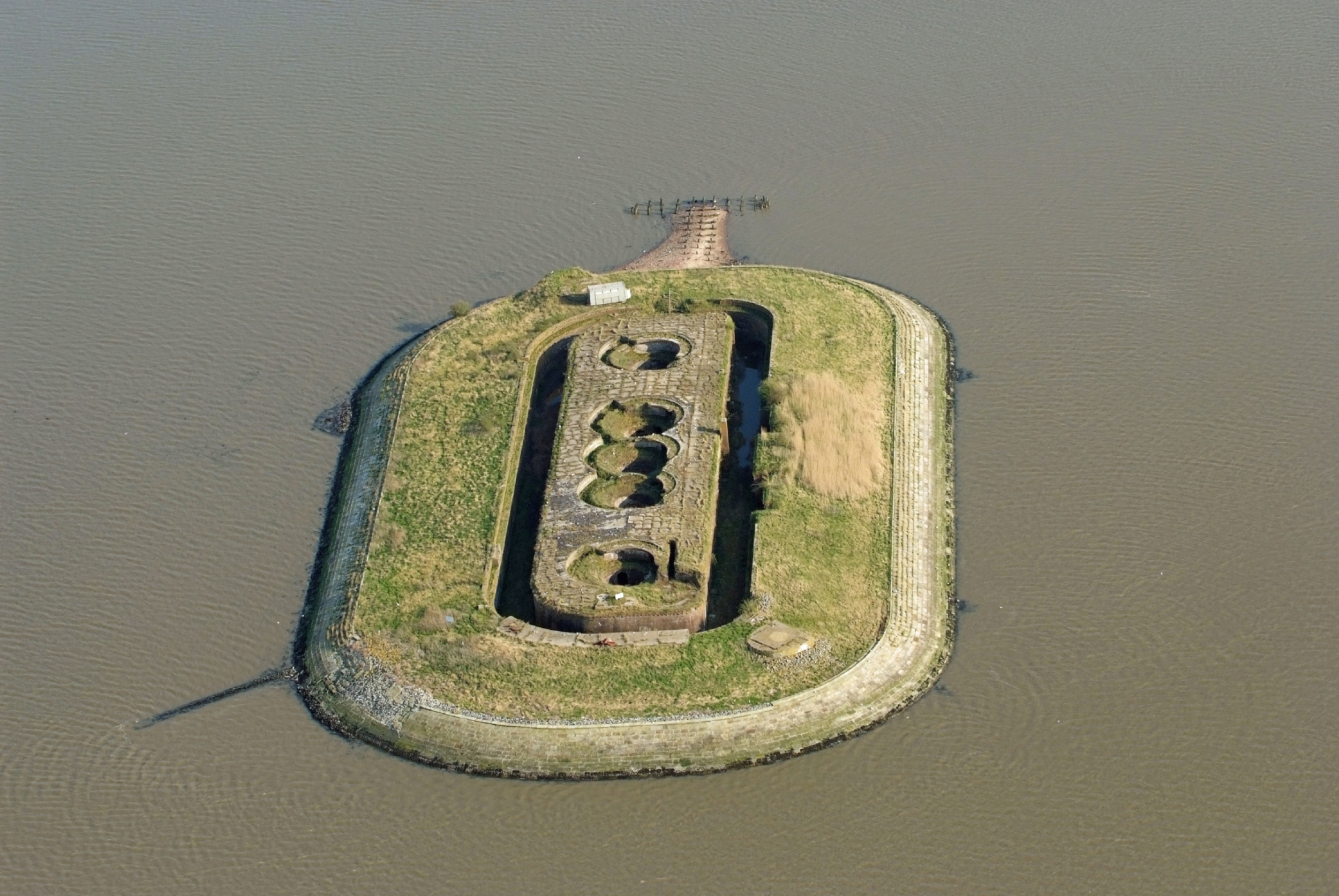
The island Langlütjen II (2013)

Langlütjen (German pronunciation: [ˈlaŋˌlʏtjən]) is the name of the two uninhabited artificial islands created in the 19th century, Langlütjen I and Langlütjen II, north off the coast of the district Wesermarsch in Lower Saxony, Germany. The islands are administered by the town of Nordenham. Their size is 16,000 and 17,000 square metres, respectively.

On the small islands are the remains of fortifications of what was first the Prussian Navy and later the Kaiserliche Marine. Its function was to protect the harbours of Bremen and Bremerhaven, but the islands were never involved in active warfare.

Langlütjen II was sold to a private owner in January 2006. Langlütjen I was sold around the same time.
