= Tianjin Free-Trade Zone =

Tianjin Free-Trade Zone 中国（天津）自由贸易试验区
- Free-Trade Zone
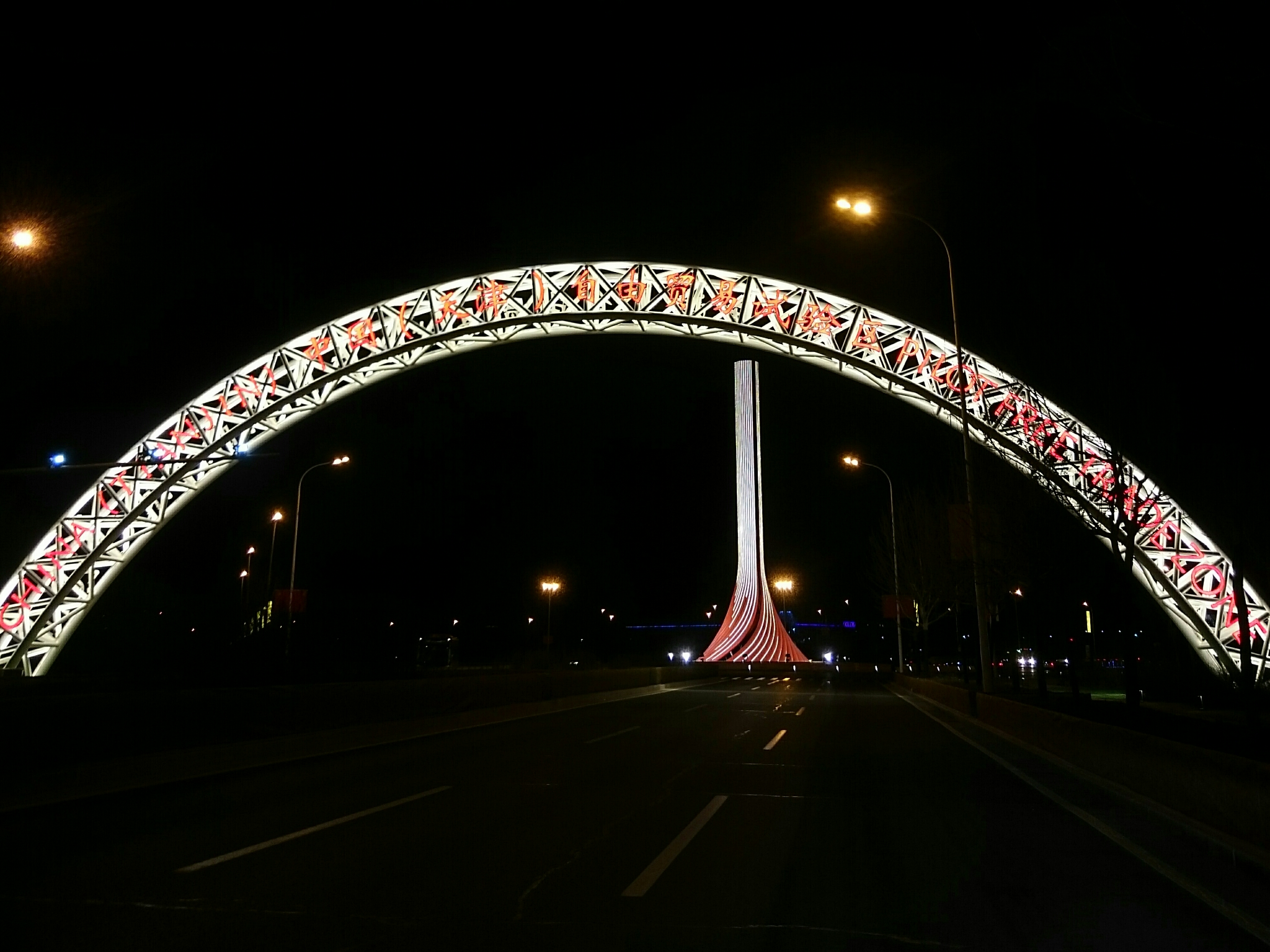
- Country: China
- Municipality: Tianjin

Area
  - Total: 119.9 km^{2} (46.3 sq mi)
- Time zone: UTC+8 (China Standard)
- Website: http://www.china-tjftz.gov.cn/

Tianjin Free-Trade Zone (Tianjin FTZ, colloquially known as 天津自由贸易区/天津自贸区 in Chinese), officially China (Tianjin) Pilot Free-Trade Zone (Chinese: 中国（天津）自由贸易试验区; pinyin: Zhōngguó (Tiānjīn) Zìyóu Màoyì Shìyànqū) is a free-trade zone in Tianjin, China. It is the only free-trade zone in North China. The zone covers three areas — Tianjin Airport Economic Area, Dongjiang Free Trade Port Zone and Binhai New Area Central Business District.

Under the Overall program of China (Tianjin) Pilot Free-Trade Zone (中国（天津）自由贸易试验区总体方案), the mission of Tianjin FTZ's foundation is an important initiative to implementation of coordinated development of Beijing, Tianjin and Hebei (京津冀协同发展战略).

== History ==
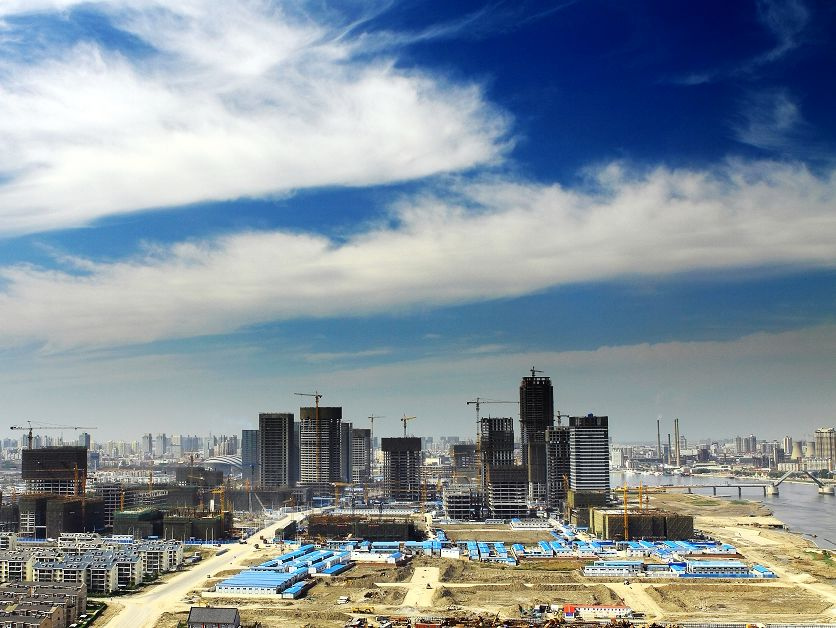
Binhai New Area Central Business District, was under construction in 2011.

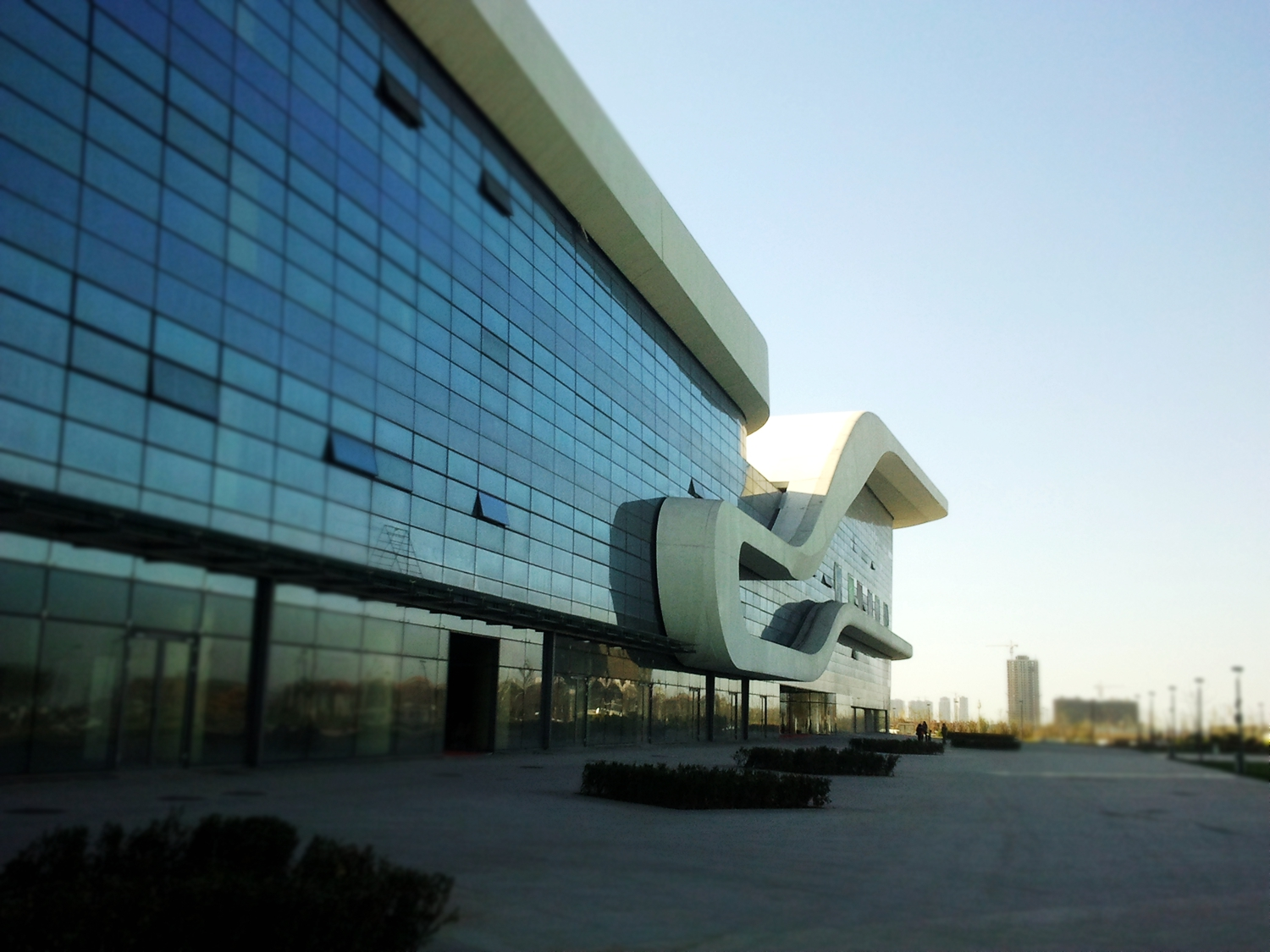
Dongjiang International Products Exhibition Center (东疆国际商品展销中心)

In 2006, the Chinese Communist Party Tianjin Municipal Research Room (中共天津市委研究室) said the Dongjiang Free Trade Port Zone will be the highly open and free trade demonstration harbor. The goal of medium-term development is built the first free-trade zone which is meeting international practice in 2015, and the goal of long-term development is built the comprehensive free-trade zone in 2020.

In December 2007, Dongjiang Free Trade Port Zone determined the clear direction for the development of free-trade zone.

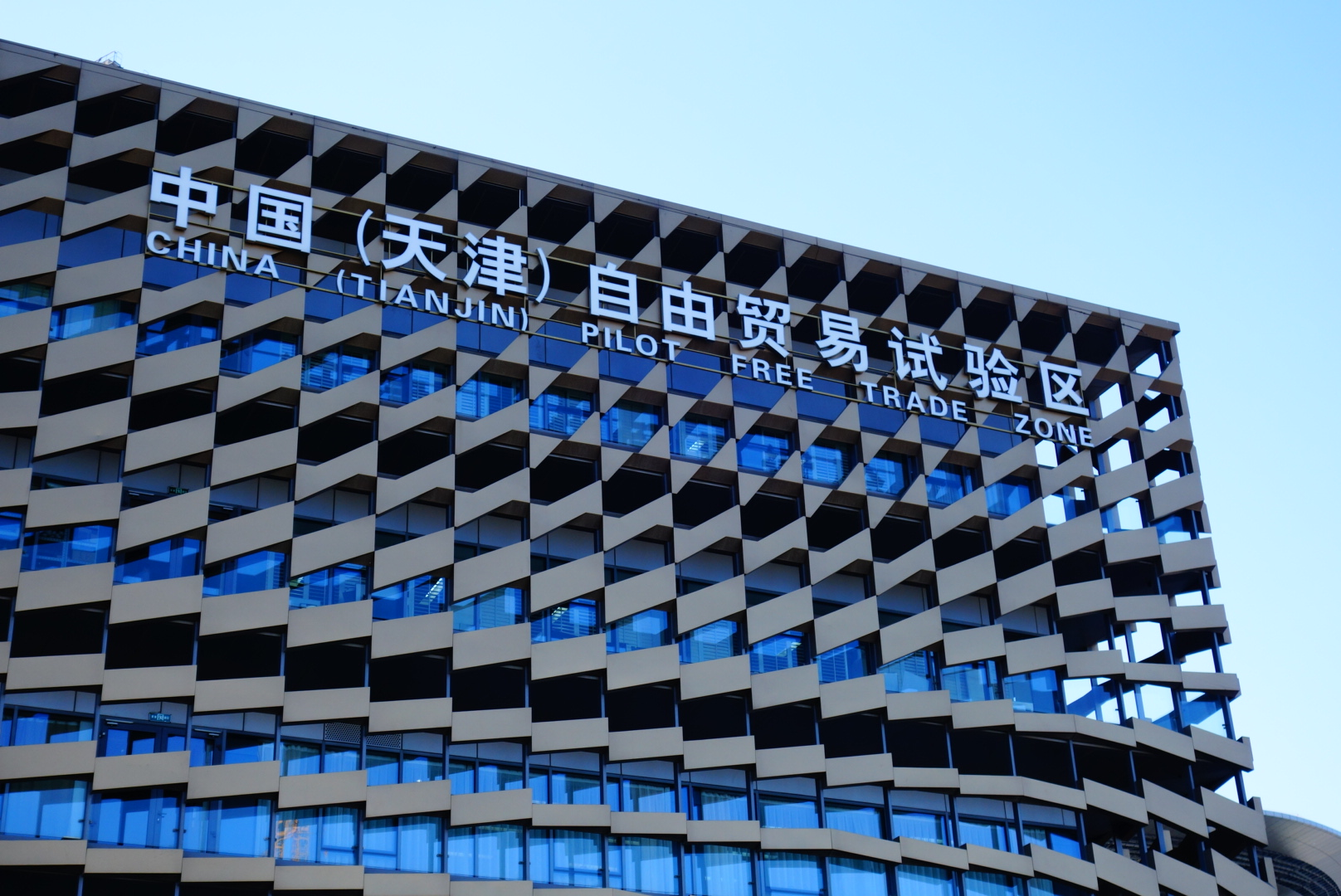
Yujiapu

In 2013, Commerce Ministry of PRC reported the embodiments of the Shanghai and Tianjin FTZ, but the embodiment of Tianjin was not passed. In July, the drafting group of the embodiment of Tianjin FTZ was founded.

On August 7, 2014, Tianjin and Beijing signed the Implement the joint development of Beijing, Tianjin and Hebei major national strategy to promote the implementation of key work agreement (贯彻落实京津冀协同发展重大国家战略推进实施重点工作协议), the agreement mentioned Beijing supported Tianjin to build the free-trade zone.

On December 28, 2014, the executive meeting of State Council of the People's Republic of China passed the resolution for Tianjin FTZ.

On March 24, 2015, the Overall program of China (Tianjin) Pilot Free-Trade Zone (中国（天津）自由贸易试验区总体方案) was passed by Politburo of the Chinese Communist Party. On April 8, 2015, the Overall program of Tianjin FTZ was approved by the State Council of the People's Republic of China.

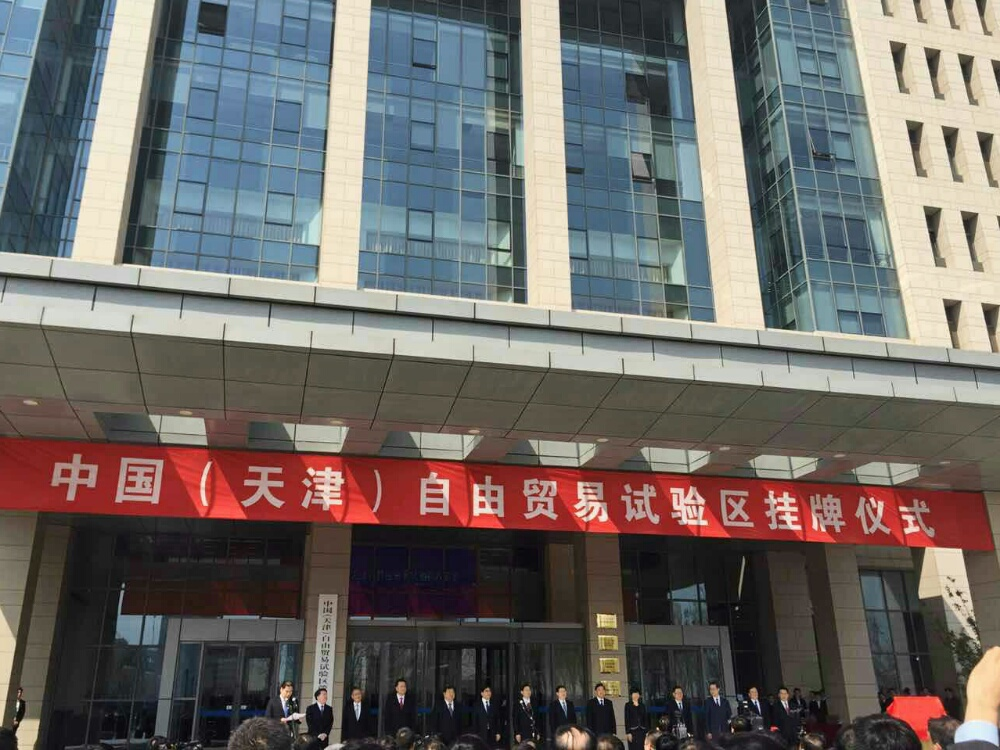
Founding Ceremony of Tianjin FTZ

On April 21, 2015, Tianjin FTZ was founded. Also, twenty-six financial institutions (include headquarters and branches) were founded in Tianjin FTZ.

== Layout ==
Tianjin Free-Trade Zone covers an area of 119.9 square kilometres (46 square miles) and included three areas — Tianjin Airport Economic Area, Dongjiang Free Trade Port Zone and Binhai New Area Central Business District.

- Tianjin Airport Economic Area: The area focuses the development on the aerospace industry, equipment manufacturing, new generation of information technology and other high manufacturing and R & D, aviation logistics and other producer services. It covers the land of 43.1 square kilometres.
- Dongjiang Free Trade Port Zone: The area focuses the development on the shipping and logistics, international trade and finance lease. It covers the land of 30 square kilometres.
- Binhai New Area Central Business District: The area focuses the development on the financial innovation. It covers the land of 46.8 square kilometres.
