= Collins Bridge =

Bridge in Florida, United States of America

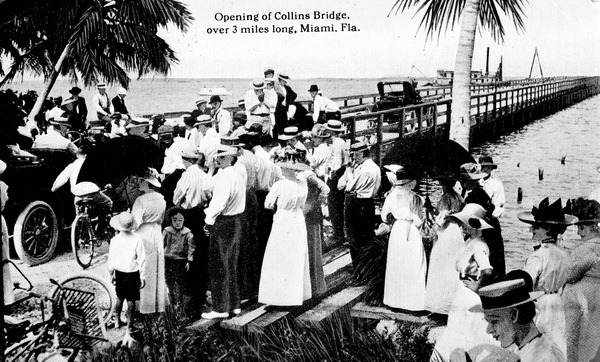
- The opening of Collins Bridge, c. 1913
- Coordinates: 25°47′21.18″N 80°11′20.77″W
- Crosses: Biscayne Bay
- Locale: Miami to Miami Beach
- Followed by: Venetian Causeway

Characteristics
- Design: Wooden truss
- Total length: 2.5 miles (4.0 km)

History
- Opened: 1913
- Closed: 1925

The Collins Bridge was a bridge that crossed Biscayne Bay between Miami and Miami Beach, Florida. At the time it was completed, it was the longest wooden bridge in the world. It was built by farmer and developer John S. Collins (1837–1928) with financial assistance from automotive parts and racing pioneer Carl G. Fisher. Fisher, an auto parts magnate, loaned Collins $50,000 in 1911 ($1.7 million, adjusted for current inflation) to complete the bridge when Collins' money ran out. Collins, then 75 years old, traded Fisher 200 acres (81 ha) of land on Miami Beach for the loan.

The 2.5-mile (4.0 km) wooden toll bridge opened on June 12, 1913, providing a critical link to the newly established Miami Beach, formerly accessible only by a ferry service. The total cost of the Collins Bridge was in excess of $150,000. The middle of the bridge had a steel lattice truss design, while the ends were primarily wooden, as well as the deck being wooden for the entire length.

The original wooden causeway was replaced in 1925 by a series of arch drawbridges and renamed the Venetian Causeway.
