= Flagler Monument Island =

Artificial island in Miami-Dade County, Florida, United States

Coordinates: 25°47′07″N 80°09′09″W

Flagler Memorial Island
- Neighborhood of Miami Beach
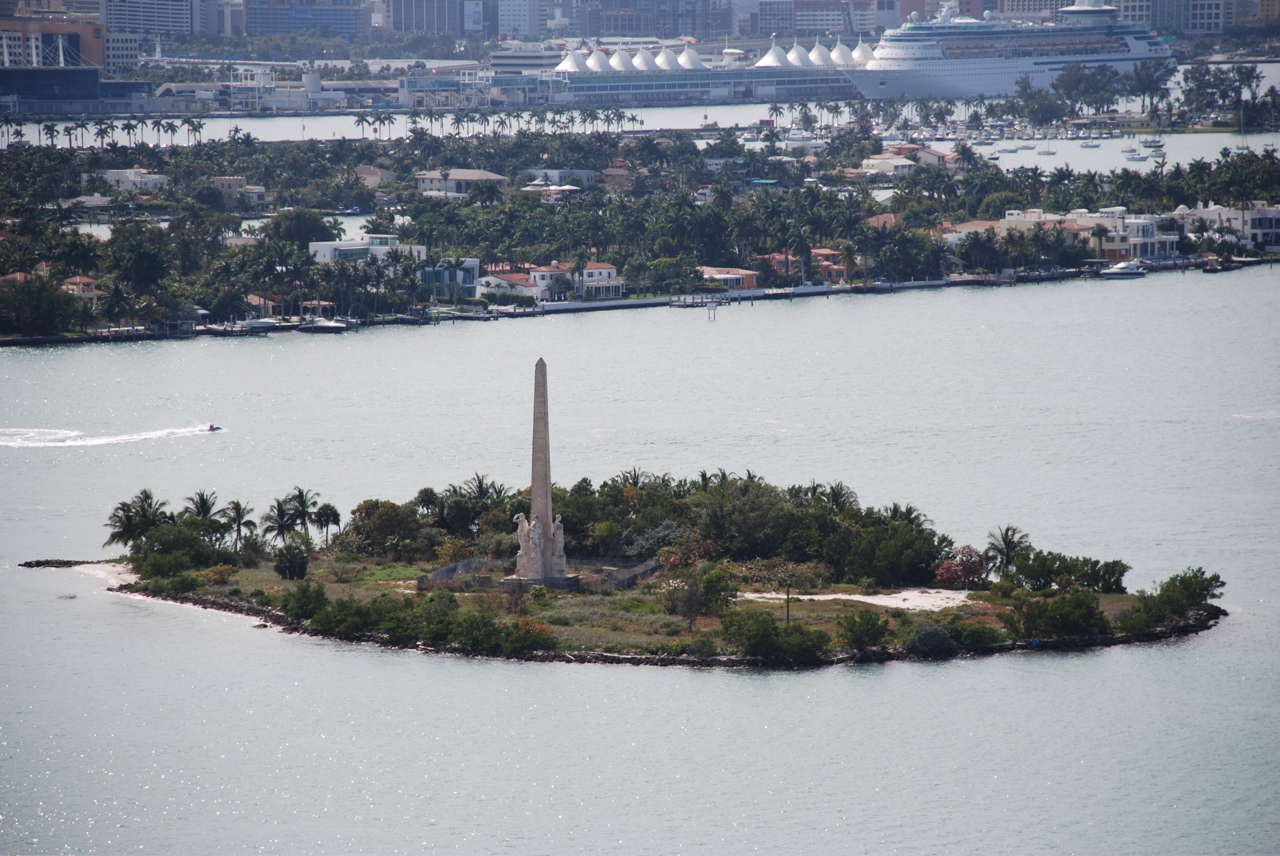
- Westward view of the island
- Interactive map of Flagler Memorial Island
- Country: United States
- State: Florida
- County: Miami-Dade County
- City: Miami Beach
- Established: 1920

Government
  - Miami Beach Mayor: Dan Gelber
  - Miami-Dade County Commissioner: Audrey Edmonson
  - House of Representatives: Cynthia A. Stafford (D)
  - State Senate: Gwen Margolis (D)
  - U.S. House: María Elvira Salazar (R)

Area
  - Total: 0.007 sq mi (0.018 km^{2})
  - Land: 0.007 sq mi (0.018 km^{2})
  - Water: 0.0 sq mi (0 km^{2}) 0%
- Elevation: 3 ft (0.91 m)

Population
  - Total: 0
- Time zone: UTC-05 (EST)
- ZIP Code: 33139
- Area codes: 305, 786

Flagler Memorial Island is an uninhabited artificial island of South Beach in the city of Miami Beach in Biscayne Bay, Florida. A 110-foot (34 m) high obelisk with allegorical sculptures at its base stands as a monument to Miami pioneer Henry M. Flagler, and was built in the center of the freshly constructed island in memory of Flagler, who died in 1913.

== Background ==
The monument on Flagler Memorial Island Florida Photographic Collection, 1922

Unlike the Venetian Islands, the perfectly rounded shape of the memorial island was not protected by a sea wall. The powerful tidal flow from Government Cut, as well as hurricanes and other forces, have drastically altered its original shape. Exotic species such as Burma reed (Neyraudia reynaudiana), seaside-mahoe (Thespesia populnea) and beach naupaka (Scaevola taccada) have covered much of the island. In 1994 the Biscayne Bay Environmental Enhancement Trust Fund and the Florida Inland Navigation District used a $220,000 bond to build a clearing in the center of the island near the monument, where visitors play volleyball and light bonfires. The project also stabilized the shoreline with the installation of lime rock boulders, and created sand beaches and dunes for boaters to enjoy. Hurricane Wilma eroded away much of the beaches in the fall of 2005, leaving many of the picnic tables partially submerged.

Miami-Dade County maintains the island, including modest picnic facilities and trash cans, and is considering issuing a $250,000 bond to correct the monument's serious disrepair due to its exposure to harsh marine elements, vandalism and years of deferred maintenance. The City of Miami Beach completed a full restoration of the Henry Flagler Monument. It was illuminating at night but once again the lights are broken and the island is in disrepair. Although the island is unpopulated, it is considered a neighborhood in the City of Miami Beach.

== History ==
Miami Beach co-founder Carl G. Fisher commissioned the construction of the obelisk monument and the four allegorical statues at the base in 1920 at a cost of $125,000. His Alton Beach Realty Company deeded the land to the City of Miami Beach in 1939.

During the preliminary dredging in 1919, a Native American war club was discovered by workers. Believed to be from the Tequesta, the club is currently in the archives at the Florida Museum of Natural History.

=== Damage and maintenance ===
The island and the monument were both donated to the city of Miami Beach in 1939. In the years since the city, county and the private sector have all contributed to maintenance. In 1998 a careless picnicker set the island on fire, destroying $250,000 worth of trees and landscaping from a 1994 restoration project. There has been a fence put up to stop people from vandalizing the base of the monument where there is a profuse amount of graffiti. In 2008 there was a group of teenagers who threw human feces at the monument and filmed it. They were later arrested by law enforcement. In early 2011, Reality Kings, an adult video maker, filmed Island Adventure on Monument Island, rousing the ire of local authorities.

=== Sculptures ===
Designed by sculptor H.P. Peterson and financed by Fisher with the help of John B. Orr and James A. Allison, the statues sit oriented in the four cardinal directions, each representing a signature aspect of Miami Beach.

Representing industry, a man in a Roman toga stands facing due north, holding a scroll and a small building. The statue suffers from considerable erosion damage to its face, scroll, and left foot. A female figure faces due east, wearing a dress and a cape. She holds a pile of books and reaches out with her left hand in a welcoming gesture. Cracks have exposed metal rebar in her hand and a crack in her cape may soon lead to further extensive damage. A statue of a sailor faces due south, shielding his eyes from the sun. He holds a shovel and sits on a plant. He is extensively damaged and may present a safety hazard. A female figure in a long dress with a tiara represents prosperity. She holds a cornucopia and a purse clutched to her chest with her left hand and her heavily damaged right hand reaches to the west.

=== Controversy ===
On February 5, 2011 a pornographic film titled Island Adventure was filmed on the island. The 50-minute movie was produced by Reality Kings. There is a law that prohibits exposing oneself in public, but Reality Kings said the law was not broken because nobody witnessed the exposing. However, Miami officials said that a permit was required to film, and that none was issued.

== Gallery ==
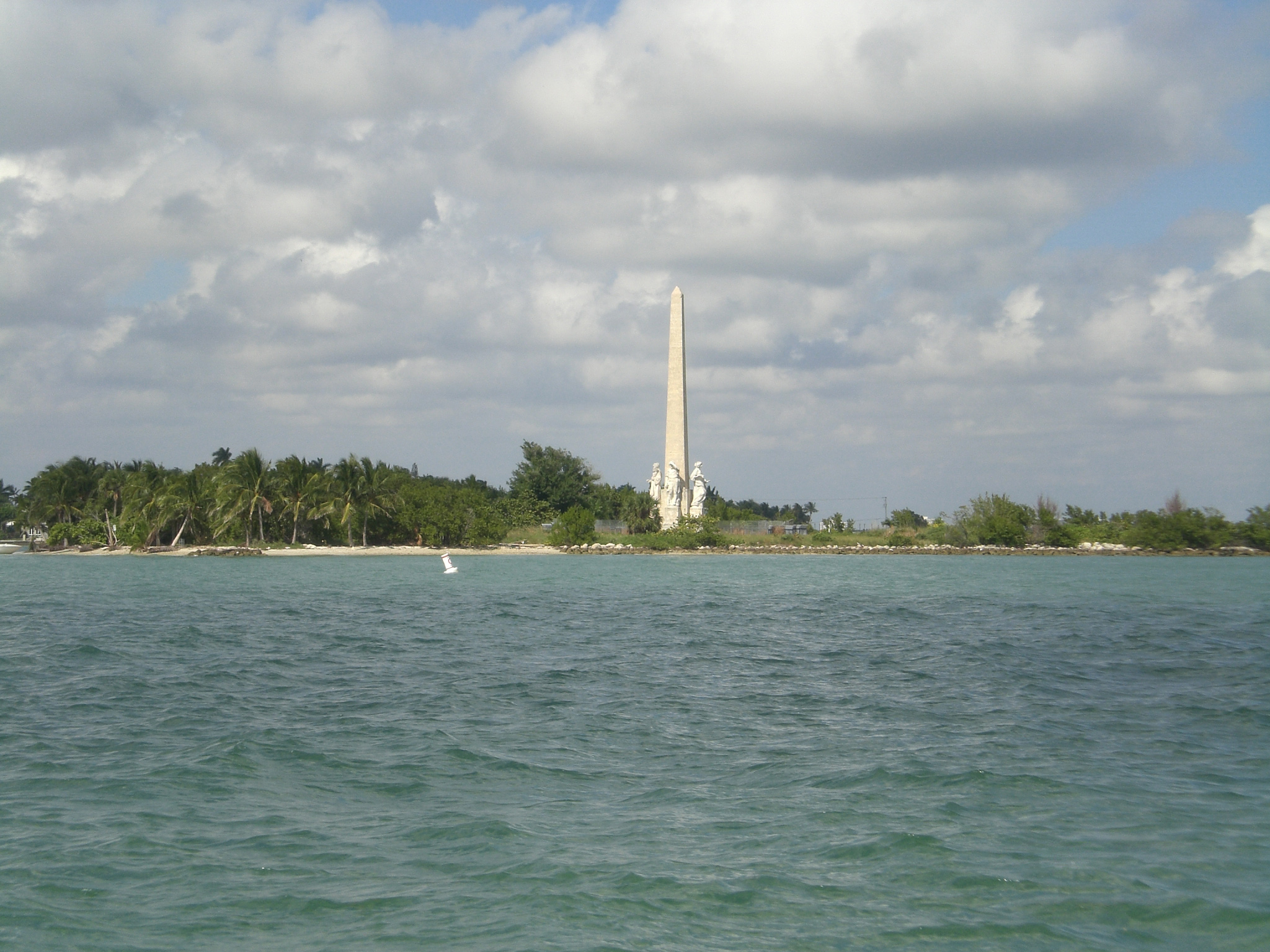
Flagler Memorial Island as seen from a boat on Biscayne Bay

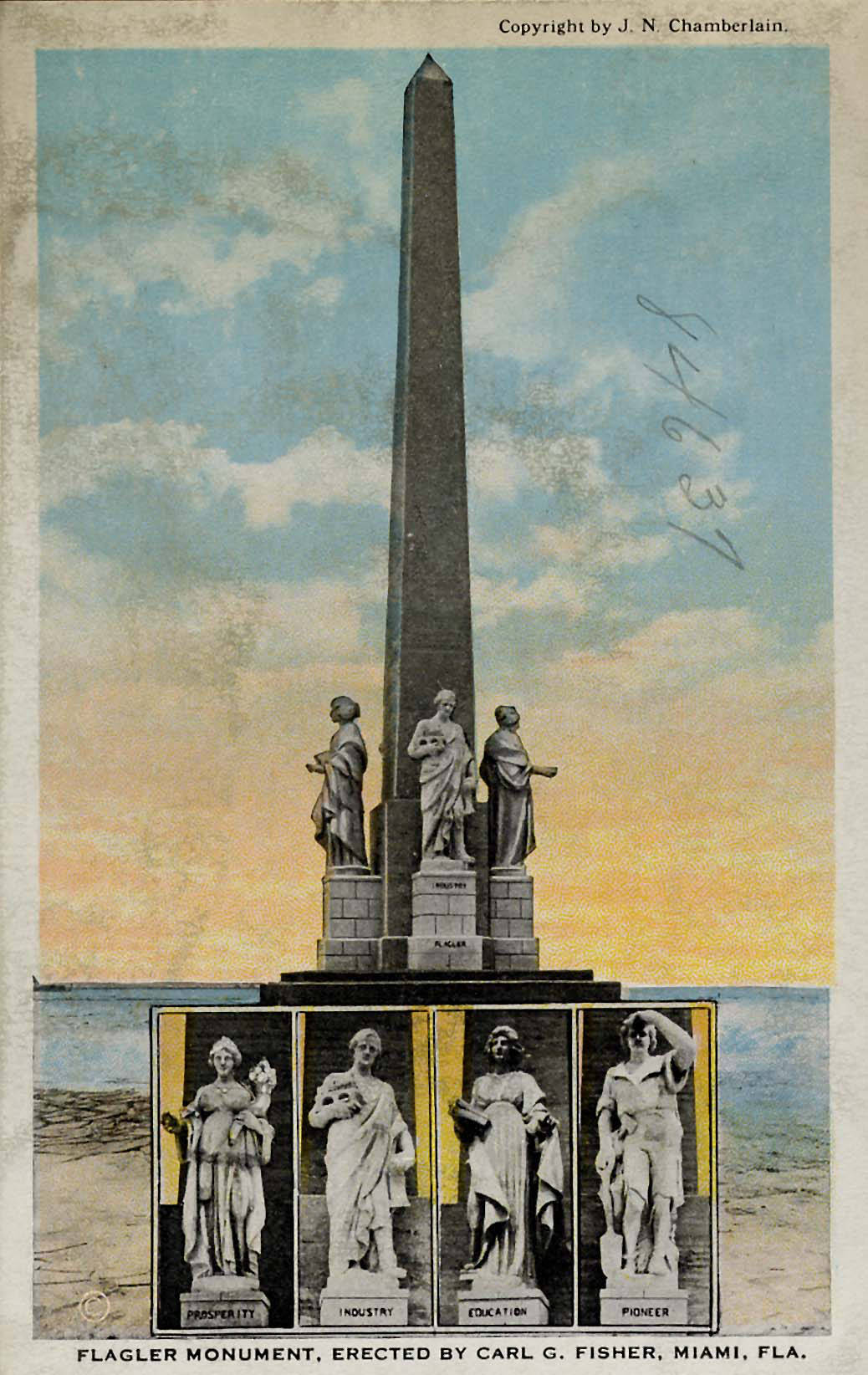
Flagler Monument
