= John S. Collins =

Pioneering land developer of Miami Beach, Florida, US

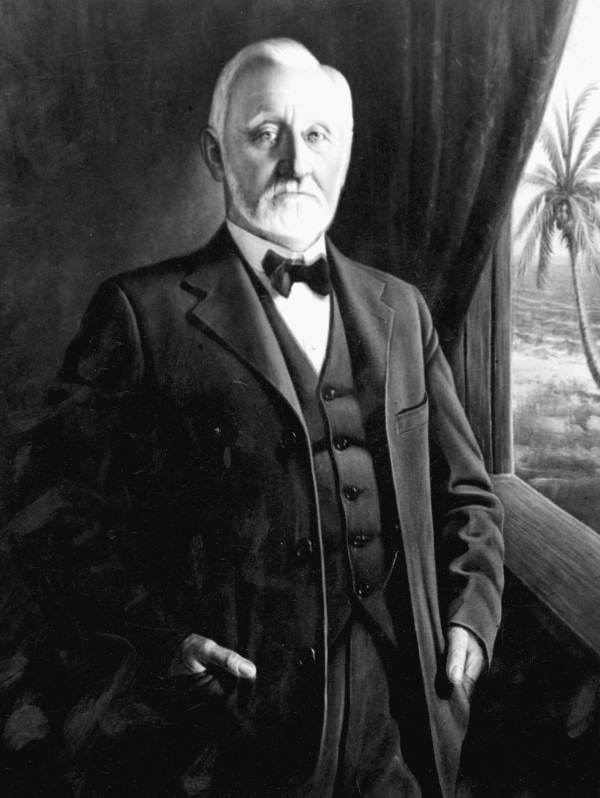
- A portrait of Collins in 1926
- Born: December 29, 1837; Moorestown, New Jersey, U.S.
- Died: February 11, 1928 (aged 90); Miami Beach, Florida, U.S.
- Spouses: Rachel A. Rogers; Sarah Stratton
- Children: Mary S. Katharine Rogers; Arthur J. Irving Allen; Sarah

John Stiles Collins (December 29, 1837 – February 11, 1928) was an American Quaker farmer from Moorestown, New Jersey who moved to South Florida at the turn of the 20th century. He attempted to grow vegetables and coconuts on the swampy, bug-infested stretch of land between Miami and the ocean, a barrier island which became Miami Beach.

Although the farming venture was not successful, with involvement from his family, including his sons and sons-in law, John S. Collins also became a land developer. He and his family formed the Miami Beach Improvement Company in 1911, instituted the first recorded use of the term "Miami Beach", and built the Collins Bridge across Biscayne Bay from the already-established City of Miami in 1913. They built a casino and an oceanfront hotel, and began residential development of the island.

The Collins Bridge project ran short of funds and the 2.5 mile (4 km) long wooden toll bridge was in danger of not being completed when 74-year-old Collins struck a deal with automotive pioneer and millionaire Carl G. Fisher (1874–1939) to loan him the needed funds in exchange for 200 acres (800,000 m^{2}) of land. Fisher later described John Collins as "a bantam rooster, cocky and unafraid."

The Collins Bridge was located at the southern terminus of promoter Fisher's Dixie Highway project, which brought traffic from the mid-west as part of the National Auto Trail road system. Collins, his family, and Fisher all became very wealthy with the development of Miami Beach, which had a 400% increase in resident population between 1920 and 1925.

John S. Collins died in 1928 at the age of 90. Collins Avenue and the Collins Canal, both on Miami Beach, are named in his honor.

== Gallery ==
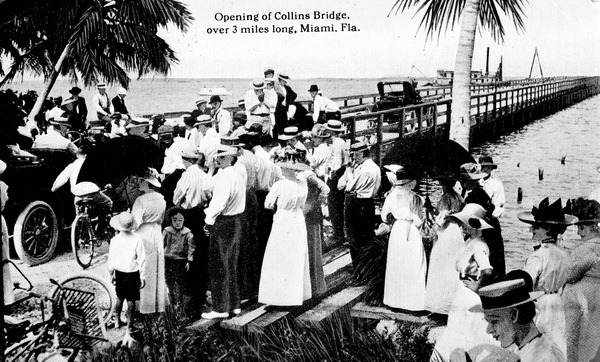
Collins Bridge across Biscayne Bay, linking Miami with the island of Miami Beach, opened in 1913 as the longest wooden bridge in the world. (Photo from the Florida Photographic Collection.)

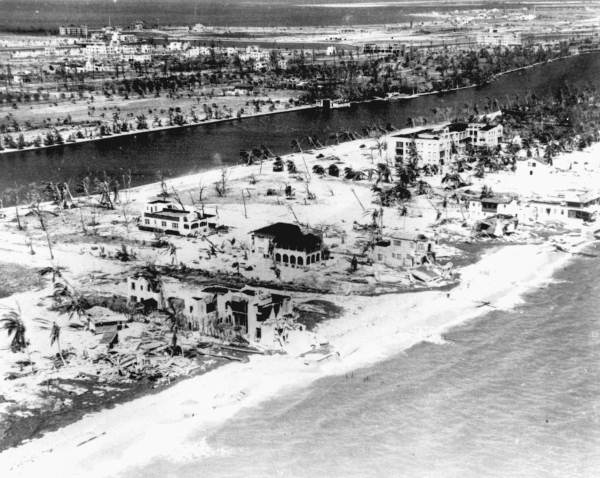
Miami Beach after the 1926 hurricane

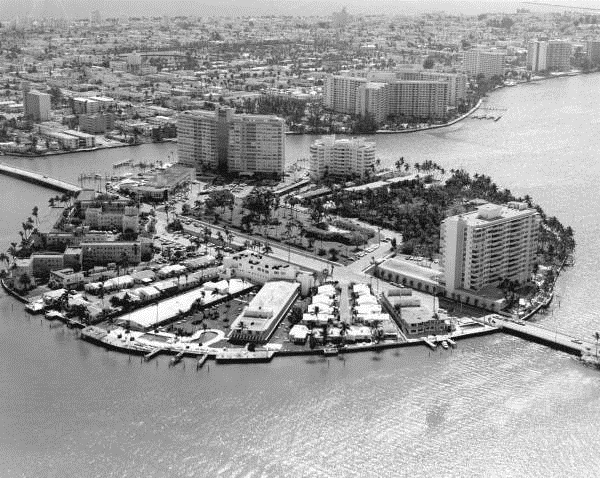
Miami Beach in the 1960s. Belle Isle is visible on the former Collins Bridge path, now the Venetian Causeway

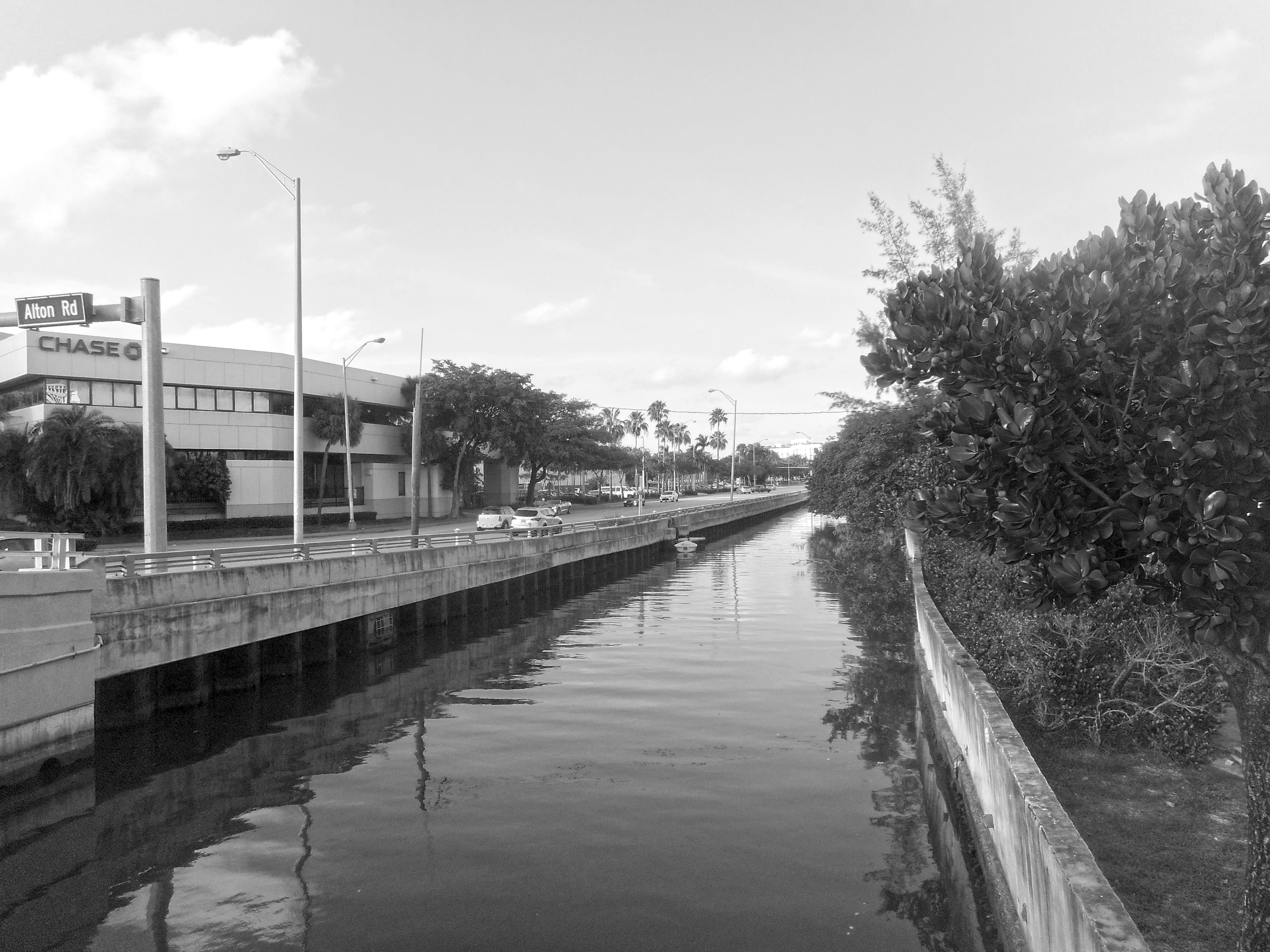
Collins Canal

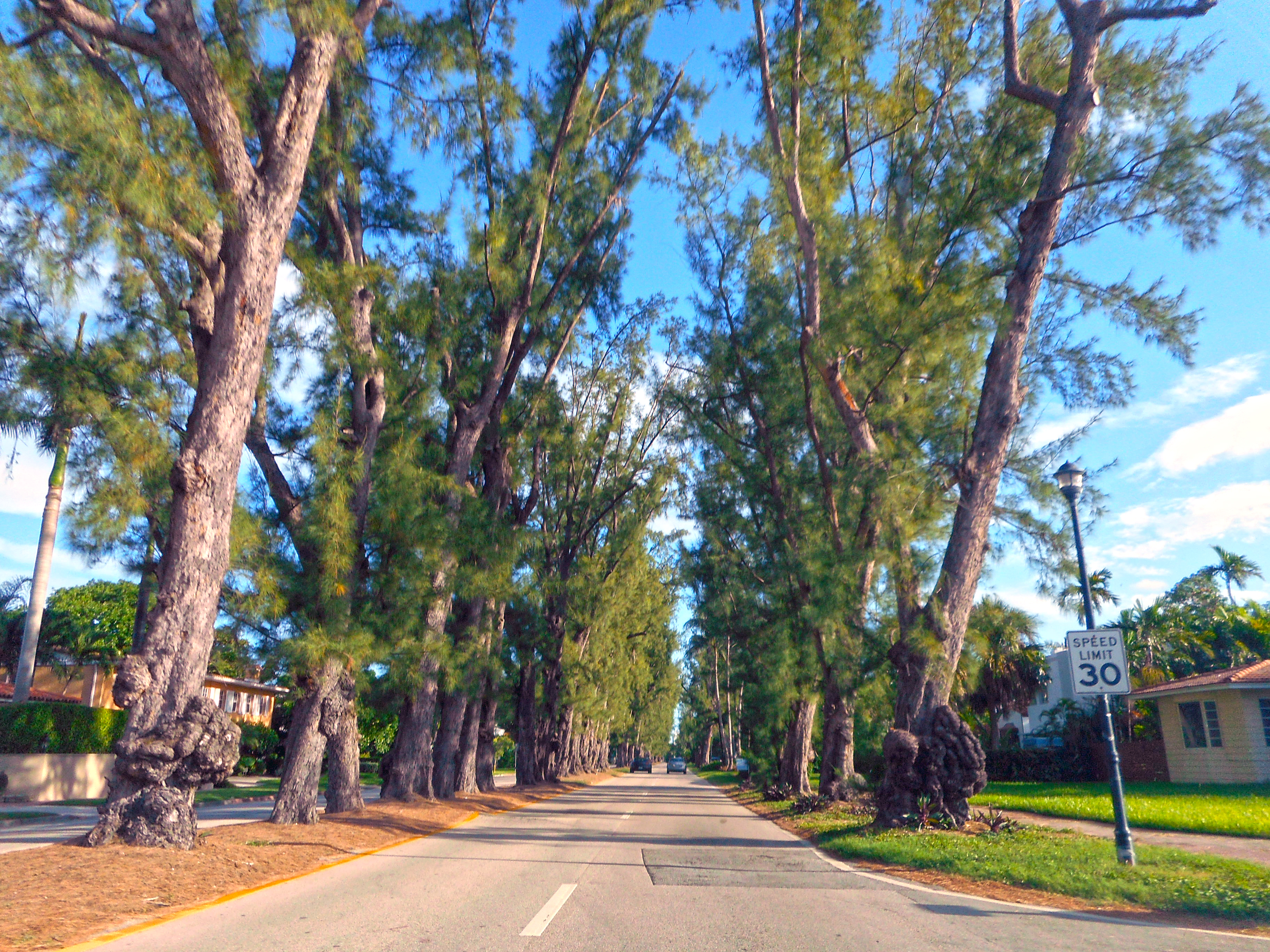
Pine Tree Drive north of 41st Street (southbound view), originally planted as a windbreak by J. S. Collins
