= Miami Beach, Florida =

Miami Beach
- City
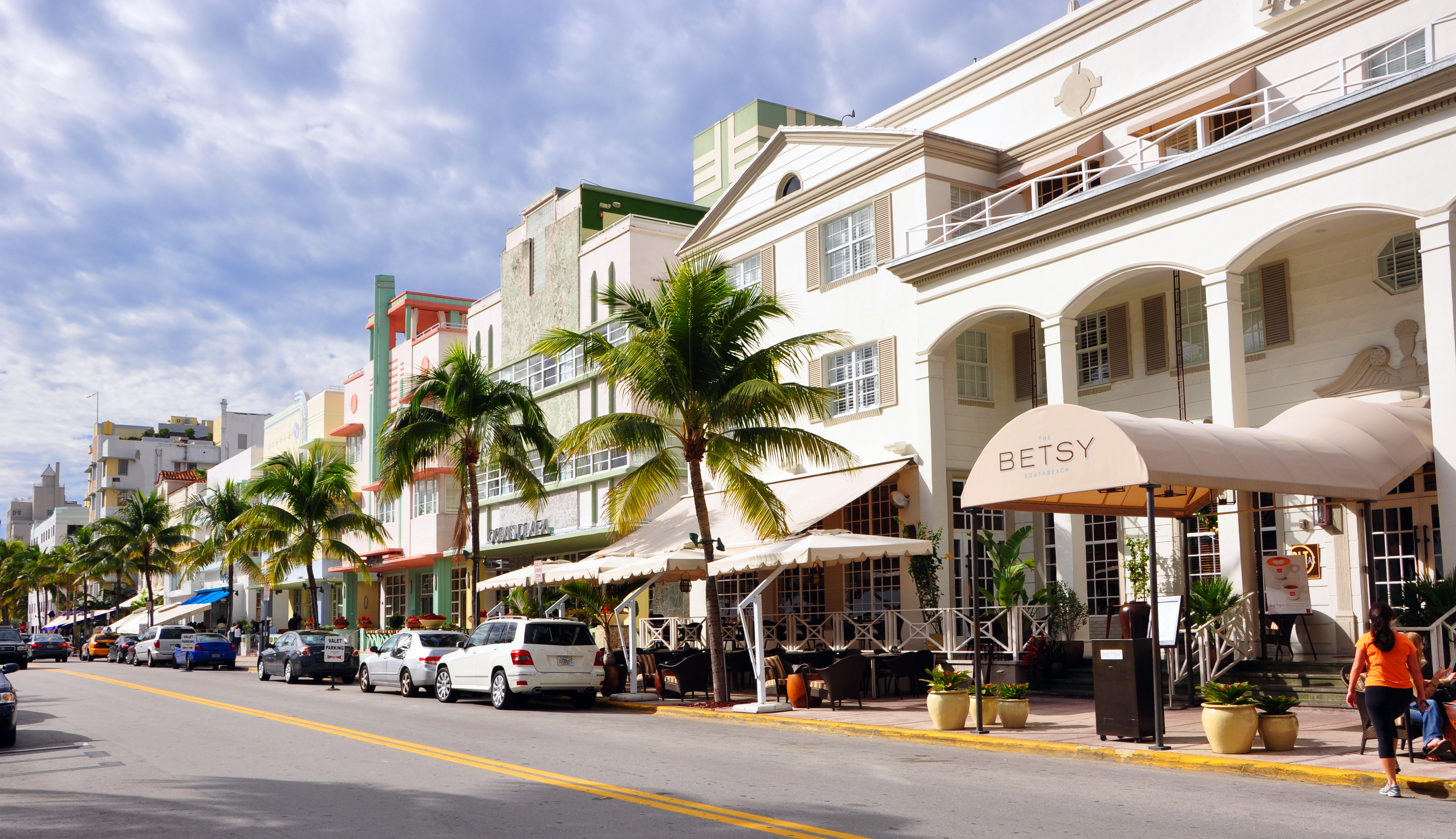
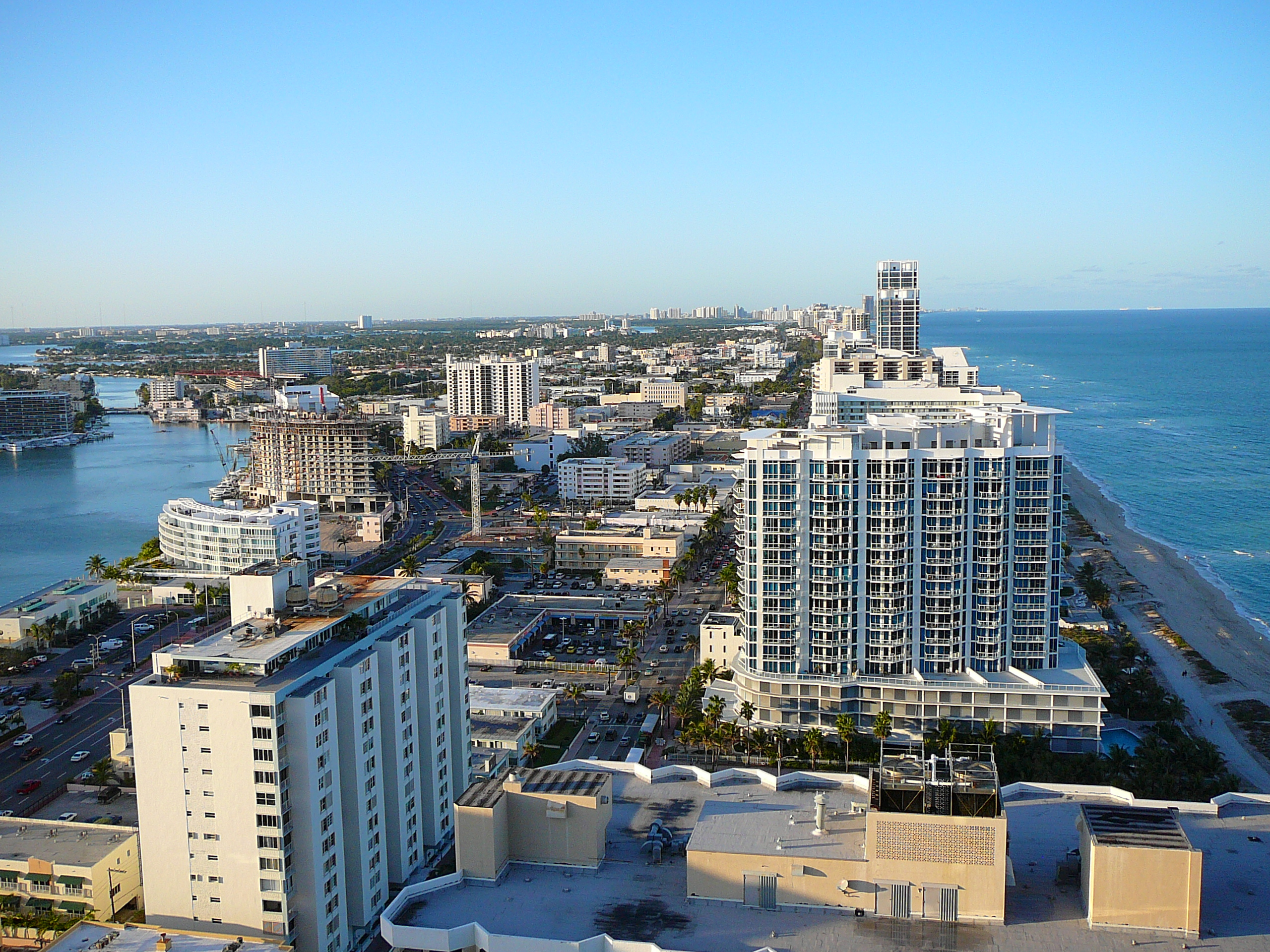
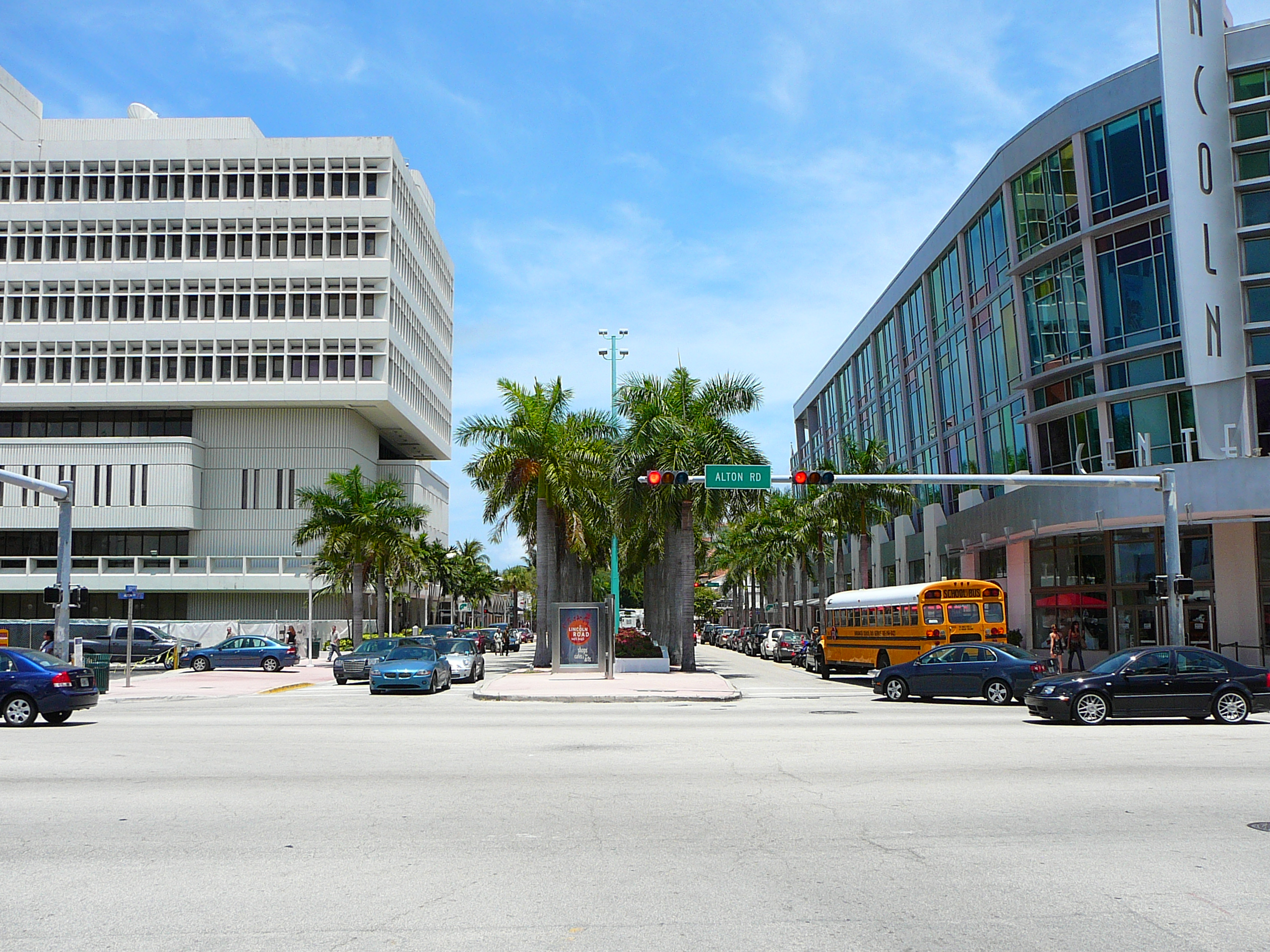
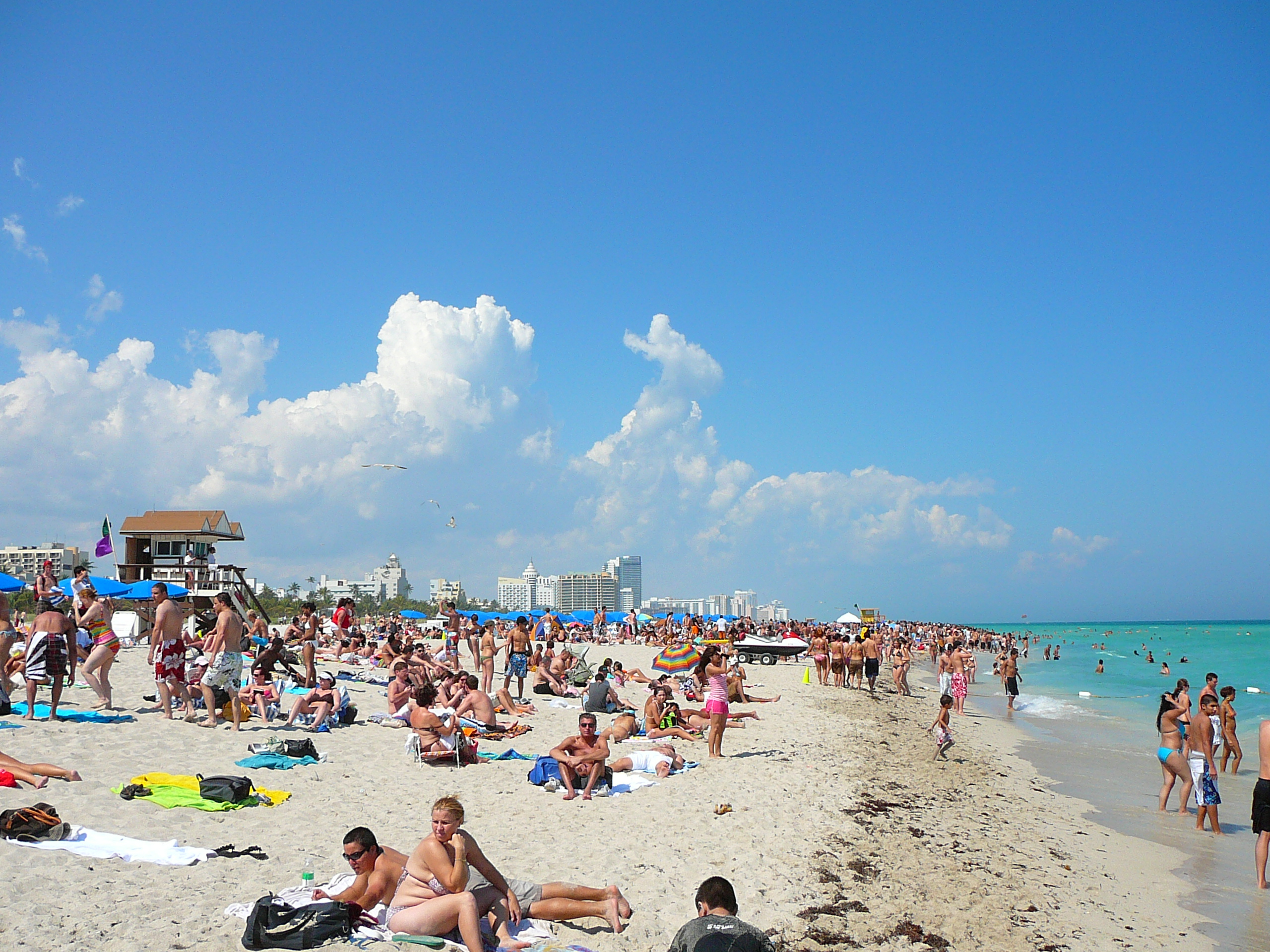
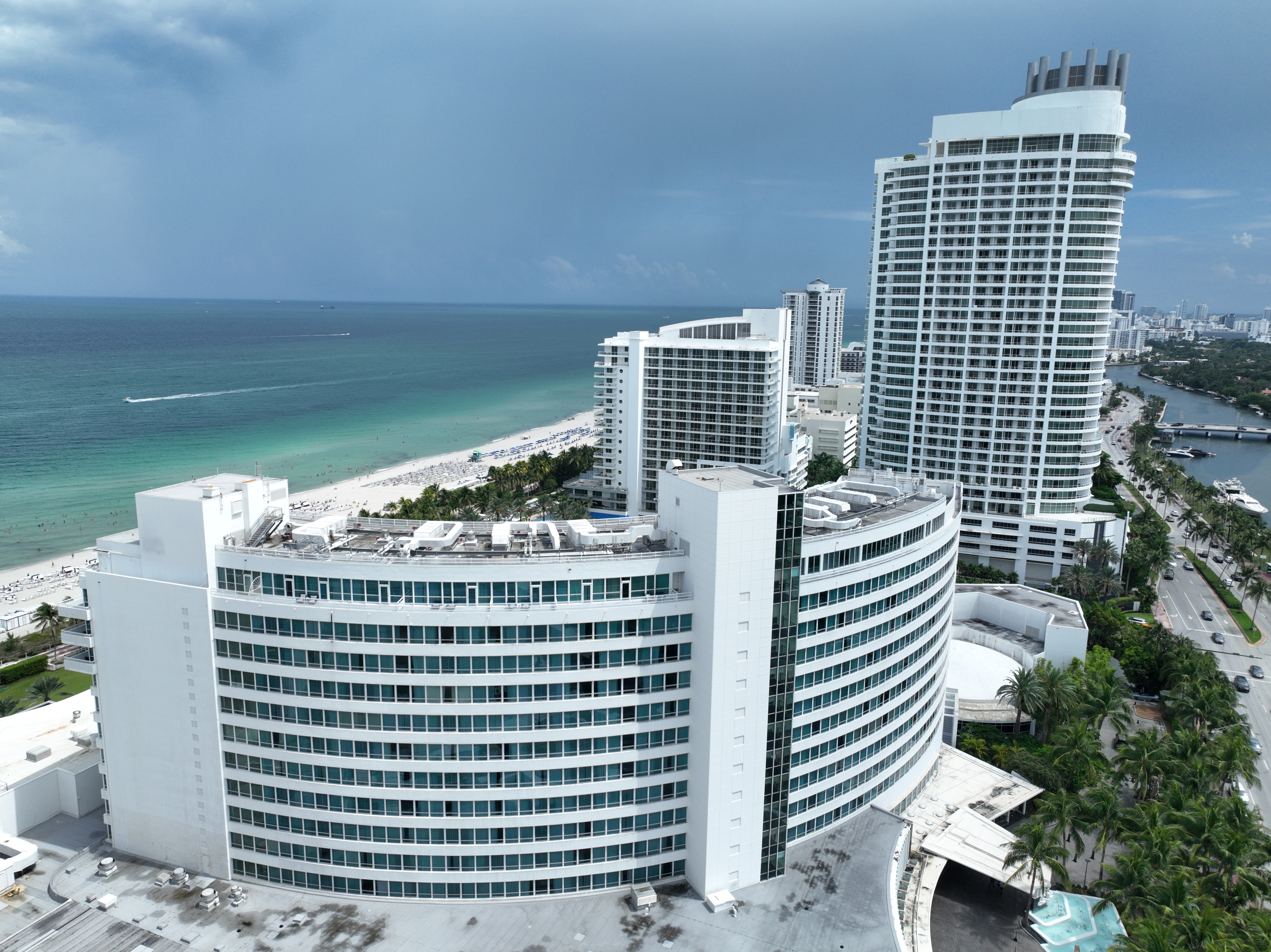
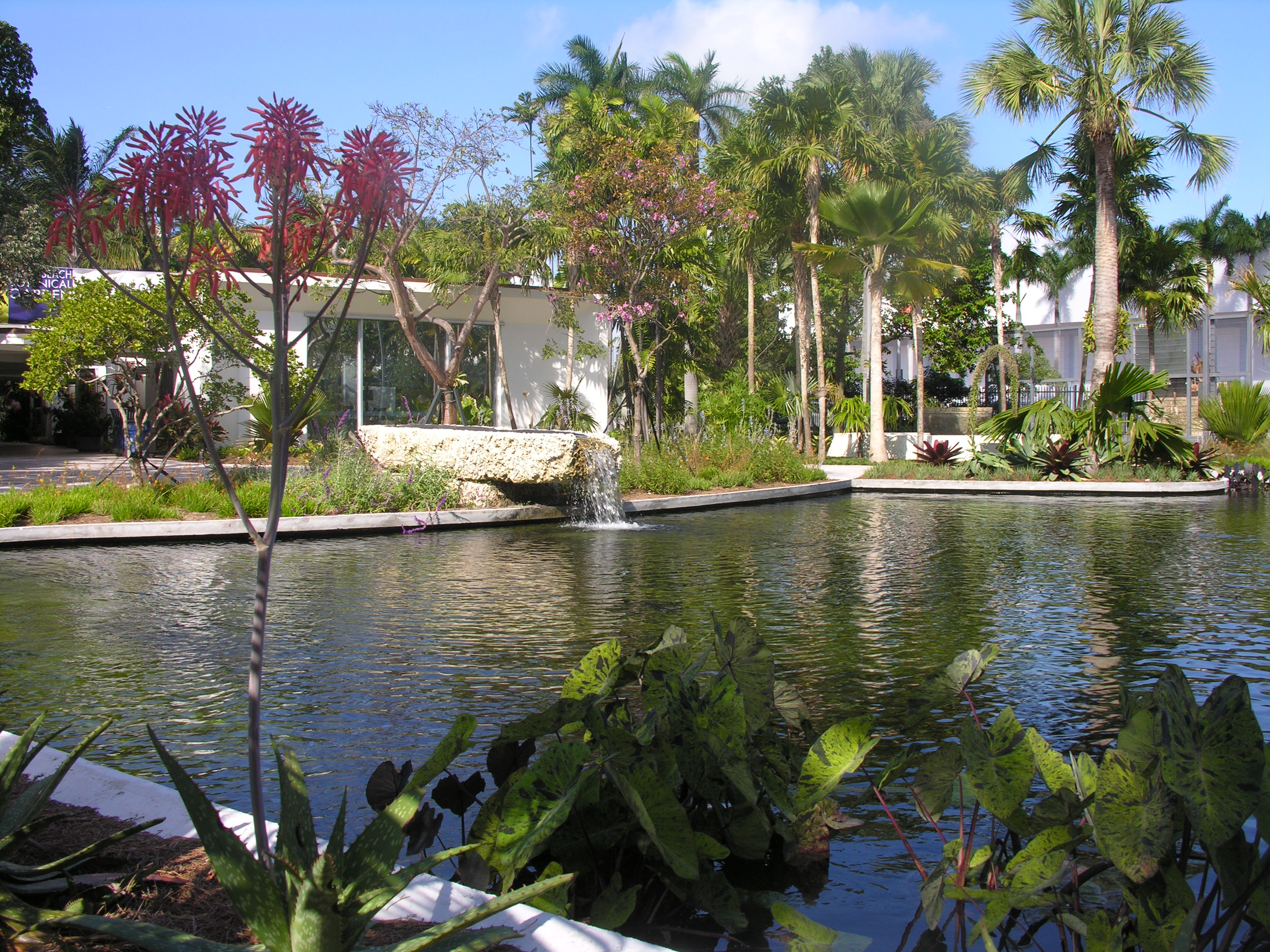
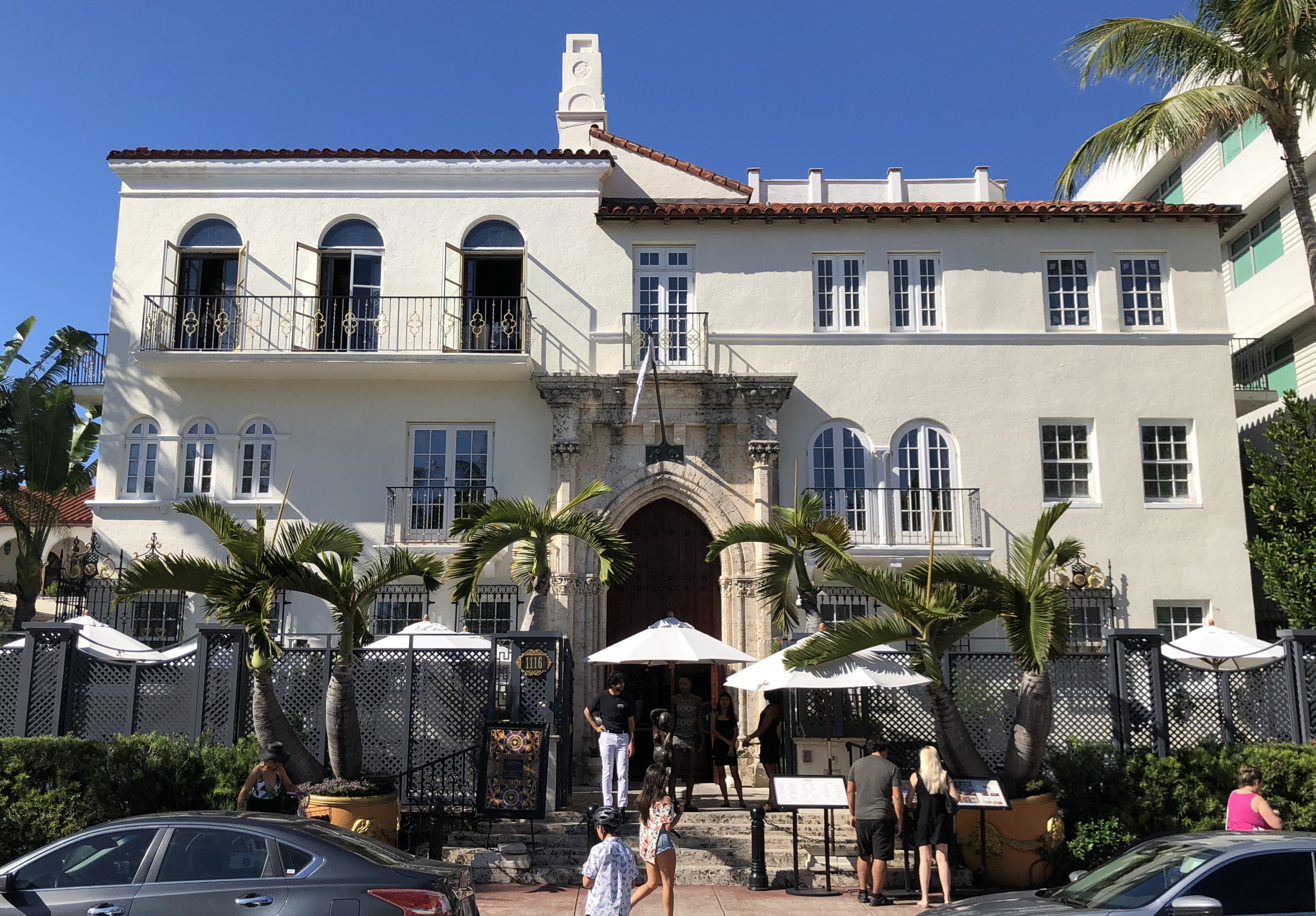
- Miami Art Deco District on Ocean Drive North Beach Lincoln Road South Beach Fontainebleau Miami Beach Miami Beach Botanical Garden Casa Casuarina

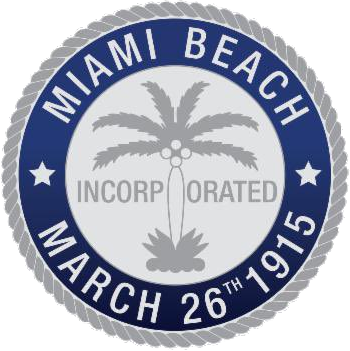
- Flag Seal
- Interactive map of Miami Beach
- Location within Florida Location within the United States
- Coordinates: 25°49′32″N 80°07′57″W
- Country: United States
- State: Florida
- County: Miami-Dade
- Incorporated: March 26, 1915; 111 years ago
- Named for: Miami River

Government
  - Type: Commission-Manager
  - Mayor: Steven Meiner
  - Commissioners: Monica Matteo-Salinas; Laura Dominguez; Alex J. Fernandez; Tanya K. Bhatt; David Suarez; Joseph Magazine
  - City Manager: Eric Carpenter
  - City Clerk: Rafael E. Granado

Area
  - Total: 15.22 sq mi (39.42 km^{2})
  - Land: 7.69 sq mi (19.92 km^{2})
  - Water: 7.53 sq mi (19.49 km^{2}) 62.37%
- Elevation: 0 ft (0 m)

Population (2020)
  - Total: 82,890
  - Estimate (2022): 80,017 ▼
  - Rank: 35th in Florida
  - Density: 10,403.8/sq mi (4,016.92/km^{2})
- Time zone: UTC−5 (EST)
  - Summer (DST): UTC−4 (EDT)
- Zip Codes: 33109, 33139, 33140, 33141.
- Area codes: 305, 786, 645
- FIPS code: 12-45025
- GNIS feature ID: 2404248
- Website: miamibeachfl.gov

Miami Beach is a coastal resort city in Miami-Dade County, Florida, United States. It is a principal city in the Miami metropolitan area of South Florida. The municipality is on natural and human-made barrier islands between the Atlantic Ocean and Biscayne Bay, the latter of which separates the Beach from the mainland city of Miami. The neighborhood of South Beach, comprising the southernmost 2.5 mi^{2} (6.5 km^{2}) of Miami Beach, along with downtown Miami and the PortMiami, collectively form South Florida's commercial center. Miami Beach's population was 82,890 at the 2020 census. It has been one of America's preeminent beach resorts since the early 20th century.

In 1979, Miami Beach's Art Deco Historic District was listed on the National Register of Historic Places. The Art Deco District is the world's largest collection of Art Deco architecture and comprises hundreds of hotels, apartments, and other structures built between 1923 and 1943. Mediterranean, Streamline Moderne, and Art Deco are all represented in the District.

The Historic District is bounded by the Atlantic Ocean on the east, Lenox Court on the west, 6th Street on the south, and Dade Boulevard along the Collins Canal to the north. The movement to preserve the Art Deco District's architectural heritage was led by former interior designer Barbara Baer Capitman, who has a street in the District named in her honor.

== History ==
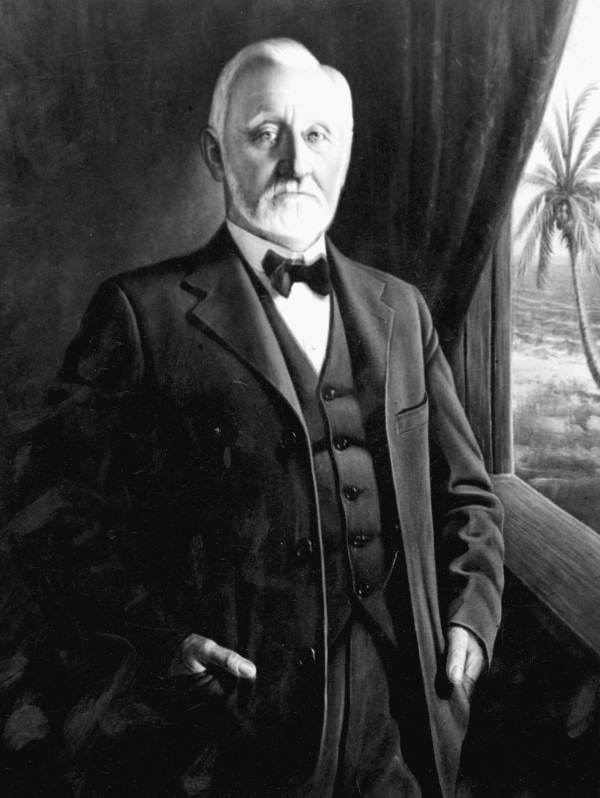
John S. Collins, founding developer of Miami Beach

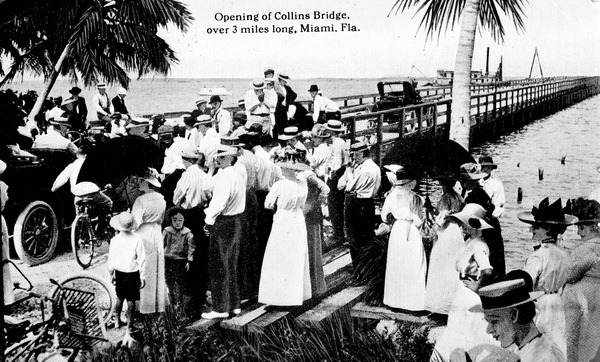
The opening of Collins Bridge in 1913, the longest wooden bridge in the world at the time

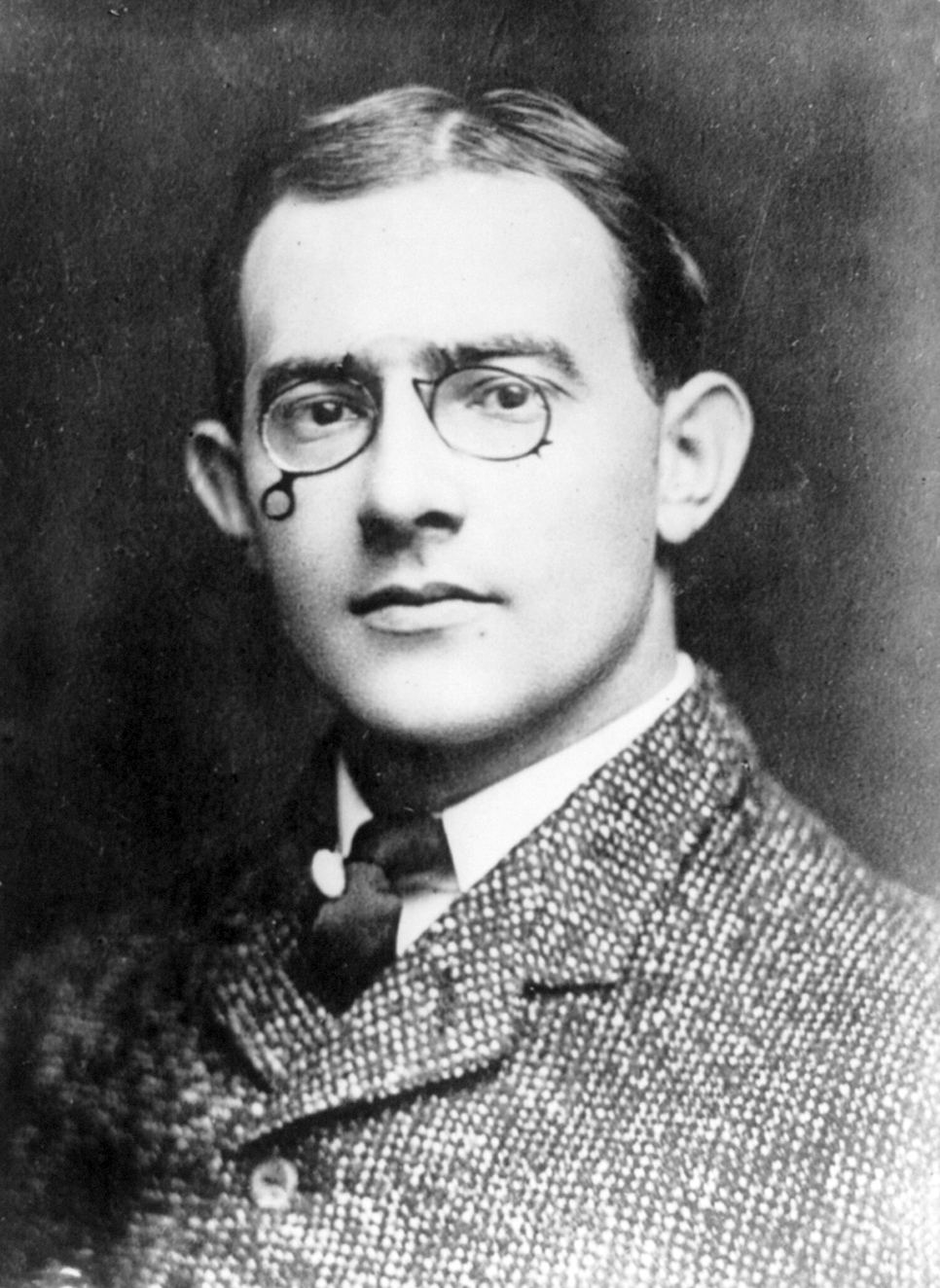
Carl G. Fisher in 1909

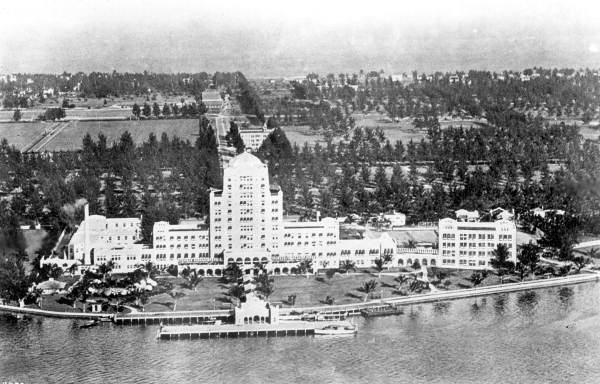
An aerial view of the Flamingo Hotel, c. 1922

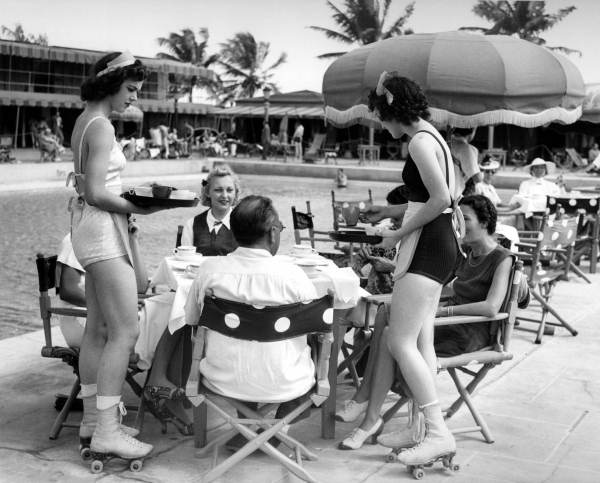
Roller skating waitresses at Roney Plaza Hotel in Miami Beach in 1939

Only a few beach areas were open to Jews in 1947 when Temple Emanu-El was built

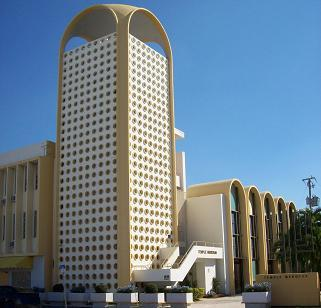
Temple Menorah was developed from an earlier Jewish Center built in 1951.

In 1870, father and son Henry and Charles Lum purchased land on Miami Beach for 75 cents an acre. The first structure built on this uninhabited oceanfront was the Biscayne House of Refuge, constructed in 1876 by the United States Life-Saving Service through an executive order issued by President Ulysses S. Grant, at approximately 72nd Street. Its purpose was to provide food, water, and a return to civilization for people who were shipwrecked. The structure, which had fallen into disuse by the time the Life-Saving Service became the U.S. Coast Guard in 1915, was destroyed in the 1926 Miami Hurricane and never rebuilt.

Miami Beach began constructing a coconut plantation along its shore in the 1880s, led by New Jersey entrepreneurs Ezra Osborn and Elnathan T. Field, but the venture failed. One of the project's investors was agriculturist John S. Collins, who achieved success by buying out other partners and planting different crops, notably avocados, on the land that later became Miami Beach. The pine trees on Pinetree Drive served as an erosion buffer for Collins's plantations. Meanwhile, across Biscayne Bay, the City of Miami was established in 1896 with the arrival of the railroad and developed further as a port when the shipping channel of Government Cut was created in 1905, cutting off Fisher Island from the south end of the Miami Beach peninsula.

Collins' family members saw the potential in developing the beach as a resort. This effort got underway in the early years of the 20th century by the Collins/Pancoast family, the Lummus brothers, both bankers from Miami, and Indianapolis entrepreneur Carl G. Fisher. Until then, the beach here was only the destination for day-trips by ferry from Miami, across the bay. By 1912, Collins and Pancoast were working together to clear the land, plant crops, supervise the construction of canals to get their avocado crop to market and set up the Miami Beach Improvement Company. There were bathhouses and food stands, but no hotel until Brown's Hotel was built in 1915 (still standing, at 112 Ocean Drive). Much of the interior landmass at that time was a tangled jungle of mangroves. Clearing it, deepening the channels and water bodies, and eliminating native growth almost everywhere in favor of landfill for development, was expensive. Once a 1600-acre, jungle-matted sand bar three miles out in the Atlantic, it grew to 2,800 acres when dredging and filling operations were completed.

With loans from the Lummus brothers, Collins had begun work on a 2½-mile-long wooden bridge, the world's longest wooden bridge at the time, to connect the island to the mainland. When funds ran dry and construction work stalled, Indianapolis millionaire and recent Miami transplant Fisher intervened, providing the financing needed to complete the Collins Bridge the following year in return for a land swap deal. That transaction kicked off the island's first real estate boom. The Collins Bridge cost over $150,000 and opened on June 12, 1913. Fisher helped by organizing an annual speed boat regatta, and by promoting Miami Beach as an Atlantic City-style playground and winter retreat for the wealthy. By 1915, Lummus, Collins, Pancoast, and Fisher were all living in mansions on the island, three hotels and two bathhouses had been erected, an aquarium built, and an 18-hole golf course landscaped.

The Town of Miami Beach was chartered on March 26, 1915; it grew to become a City in 1917. Even after the town was incorporated in 1915 under the name of Miami Beach, many visitors thought of the beach strip as Alton Beach, indicating just how well Fisher had advertised his interests there. The Lummus property was called Ocean Beach, with only the Collins interests previously referred to as Miami Beach. In 1925, the Collins Bridge was replaced by the Venetian Causeway, described as "a series of drawbridges and renamed the Venetian Causeway".

Carl Fisher was the main promoter of Miami Beach's development in the 1920s as the site for wealthy industrialists from the north and Midwest to build their winter homes. Many other Northerners were targeted to vacation on the island. To accommodate the wealthy tourists, several grand hotels were built, among them: The Flamingo Hotel, The Fleetwood Hotel, The Floridian, The Nautilus, and the Roney Plaza Hotel. In the 1920s, Fisher and others created much of Miami Beach as landfill by dredging Biscayne Bay; this human-made territory includes Star, Palm, and Hibiscus Islands, the Sunset Islands, much of Normandy Isle, and all of the Venetian Islands except Belle Isle. The Miami Beach peninsula became an island in April 1925 when Haulover Cut was opened, connecting the ocean to the bay, north of present-day Bal Harbour. The great 1926 Miami hurricane put an end to this prosperous era of the Florida Boom, but in the 1930s Miami Beach still attracted tourists, and investors constructed the mostly small-scale, stucco hotels and rooming houses, for seasonal rental, that comprise much of the present "Art Deco" historic district.

Carl Fisher brought Steve Hannagan to Miami Beach in 1925 as his chief publicist. Hannagan set-up the Miami Beach News Bureau and notified news editors that they could "Print anything you want about Miami Beach; just make sure you get our name right." The News Bureau sent thousands of pictures of bathing beauties and press releases to columnists like Walter Winchell and Ed Sullivan. One of Hannagan's favorite venues was a billboard in Times Square, New York City, where he ran two taglines: "It's always June in Miami Beach" and "Miami Beach, Where Summer Spends the Winter."

Antisemitism was rampant in the 1920s and into the 30s. Developer Carl Fisher would sell property only to gentiles so Jews were required to live south of Fifth Street. As recently as the 1930s, hotels refused to accept Jews. As the 1930s developed, the "dismantling on Miami Beach of restrictive barriers to Jewish ownership of real estate" was underway; many Jews bought properties from others.

By the 1940s and 50s, an increasing number of Jewish families built hotels. The first "skyscraper" was the 18-story Lord Tarleton Hotel built in 1940 by Samuel Jacobs. The Jewish mobster Meyer Lansky, who ran some "carpet joints" (gambling operations) in Florida by 1936, and eventually controlled casinos in Cuba and Las Vegas, retired in Miami and died in Miami Beach.

During World War II, Jewish doctors were not granted staff privileges at any area hospitals so the community built Mount Sinai Medical Center on Miami Beach. The North Shore Jewish Center was built in 1951 and became Temple Menorah after an expansion in 1963.

Post–World War II economic expansion brought a wave of immigrants to South Florida from the Northern United States, which significantly increased the population in Miami Beach within a few decades. After Fidel Castro's rise to power in 1959, a wave of Cuban refugees entered South Florida and dramatically changed the demographic make-up of the area. In 2017, one study named zip code 33109 (Fisher Island, a 216-acre island located just south of Miami Beach), as having the 4th most expensive home sales and the highest average annual income ($2.5 million) in 2015.

The sun and warm climate attracted many Jewish families and retirees. One estimate states that "20,000 elderly Jews" were part of the population of the beach in the late 1970s". In a 2017 interview, a demographer from the University of Miami estimated that there "might have been as many as 70,000 Jews in Miami Beach at one point" declining to "around 19,000 in 2014". The decline was motivated partly by "increasing prices during the art deco movement and an increase in crime and changing cultural demographics".

In 1980 however, 62 percent of the population of Miami Beach was still Jewish. During the 1980s many of the Jewish citizens left and moved to "Delray Beach, Lake Worth and Boca Raton". During the 1990s, South Beach transformed into a home of the fashion industry and celebrities. In 1999, there were only 10,000 Jewish people living in Miami Beach.

=== Timeline ===
20th century cityscape, including the Miami Beach Convention Center

Timeline of Miami Beach, Florida

- 1896 – City of Miami founded with the recent arrival extension Henry Flagler's FEC railroad.
- 1905 – Government Cut manmade shipping channel created separating Miami Beach and Fisher Island.
- 1912 – Miami Beach Improvement Company founded.
- 1913 – Collins Bridge (now Venetian Causeway), first bridge between Miami and Miami Beach, built.
- 1915
  - Miami Beach incorporated.
  - John Newton Lummus becomes first mayor of Miami Beach.
  - Brown's Hotel first hotel built in Miami Beach, still standing today at 112 Ocean Drive.
- 1920
  - Population: 644.
  - County Causeway (now MacArthur Causeway) connecting Miami and Miami Beach opens.
- 1925
  - Venetian Causeway opens.
  - Miami Beach becomes an island when the Haulover cut opens in April connecting the ocean to the bay just north of Bal Harbour, Florida
- 1926 - Miami Beach sustains significant damage from 1926 Miami hurricane
- 1928
  - Al Capone buys property in Miami Beach.
  - 79th Street Causeway built to connect Miami Beach to Hialeah Park Race Track.
- 1930 – Population: 6,494.
- 1935 – Many of the famous Art Deco hotels along current day Ocean Drive are built between 1935 and 1941 before the onset of WWII ends construction. Colony (1935), Savoy Plaza (1935), The Tides (1936), Surf Hotel (1936), Beacon (1936), Cavalier (1936), Leslie (1937), Park Central (1937), Barbizon (1937), Waldorf Towers (1937), Victor (1937), Clevelander (1938), Crescent (1938), Carlyle (1939), Cardozo (1939), Winterhaven (1939), Bentley (1939), Breakwater (1939), Imperial (1939), Majestic (1940), Avalon (1941), Betsy Ross Hotel (1941), St. Charles (1941), Clyde Hotel (1941).
- 1937 – WKAT radio begins broadcasting.
- 1940 – Population: 28,012.
- 1954 – Fontainebleau Hotel in business.
- 1958 – Miami Beach Convention Center opens.
- 1959 – Miami International Airport dedicated near Miami Beach.
- 1960 – Population: 63,145.
- 1961 – The Julia Tuttle Causeway between Miami and Miami Beach opens.
- 1968 – August: 1968 Republican National Convention held in Miami Beach.
- 1971 – Annual South Florida Auto Show begins.
- 1972
  - July - 1972 Democratic National Convention held in Miami Beach.
  - August - 1972 Republican National Convention held in Miami Beach.
- 1973 – February: A mentally ill man firebombs a crowded cafeteria on Collins Avenue, killing three people and injuring about 130.
- 1977 – September: 35th World Science Fiction Convention held in Miami Beach.
- 1979 – Much of Miami South Beach area becomes a historic preservation zone.
- 1984 – Popular NBC TV show Miami Vice filmed in many locations in Miami and Miami Beach for five seasons between 1984 and 1989.
- 1997 – July 15: Fashion designer Gianni Versace killed at Casa Casuarina.
- 2000 – Blue and Green Diamond hi-rises built.
- 2001 – Murano at Portofino hi-rise built.
- 2002
  - Annual international Art Basel Miami Beach (art fair) begins.
  - Continuum hi-rise built
- 2004 – Setai Hotel and ICON hi-rise built.
- 2007 – Matti Herrera Bower becomes mayor.
- 2010 – Population: 87,779.
- 2011 – November 1: Miami Beach mayoral election, 2011 held; Bower stays in office.
- 2013 – Philip Levine becomes mayor.
- 2015 – November 3: Miami Beach mayoral election, 2015 held; Levine stays in office.

== Geography ==
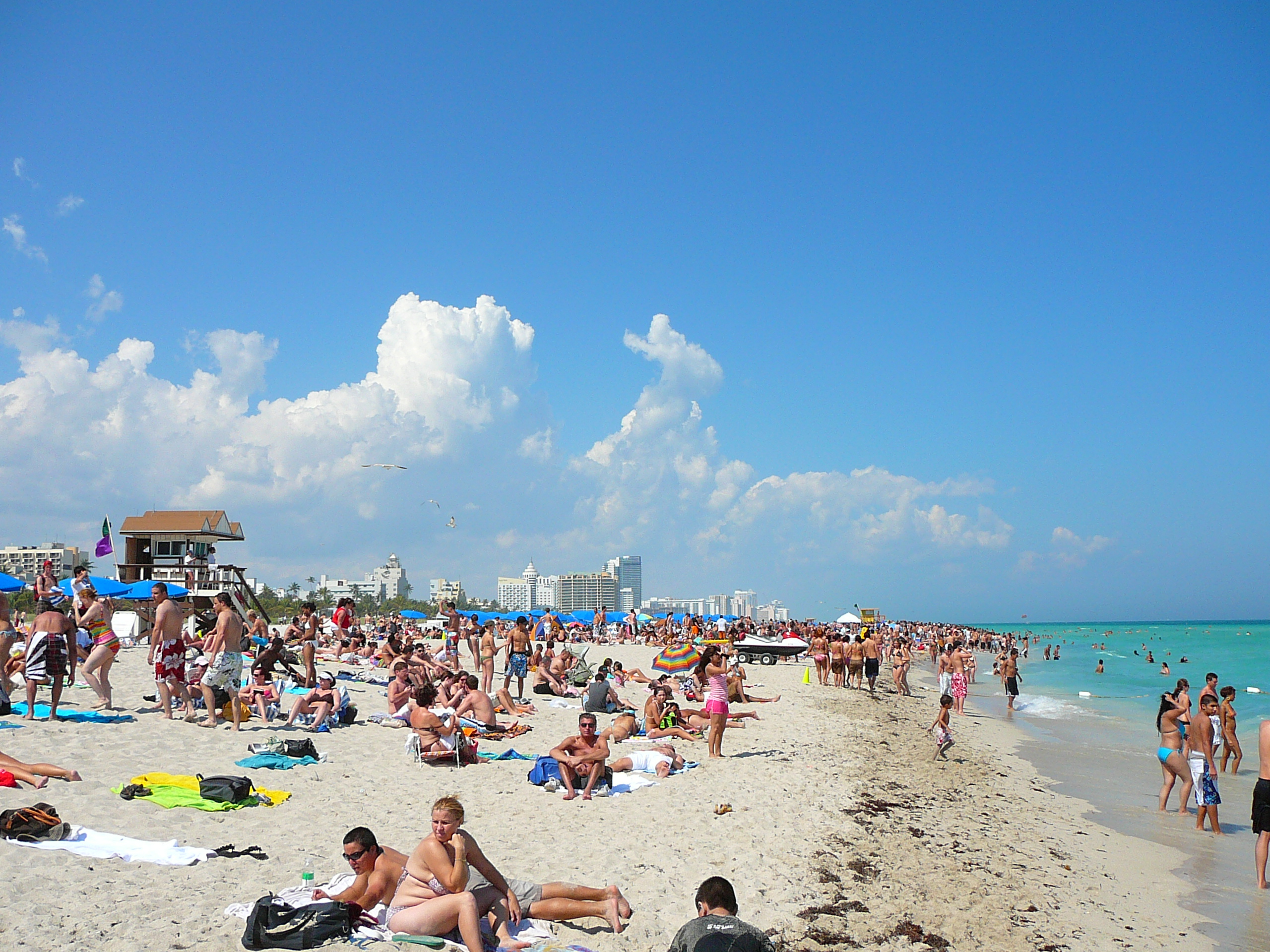
South Beach in March 2008

According to the U.S. Census Bureau, the city has a total area of 18.7 sq mi (48.5 km^{2}), of which 7.0 sq mi (18.2 km^{2}) is land and 11.7 sq mi (30.2 km^{2}) (62.37%) is water.

=== Elevation and tidal flooding ===
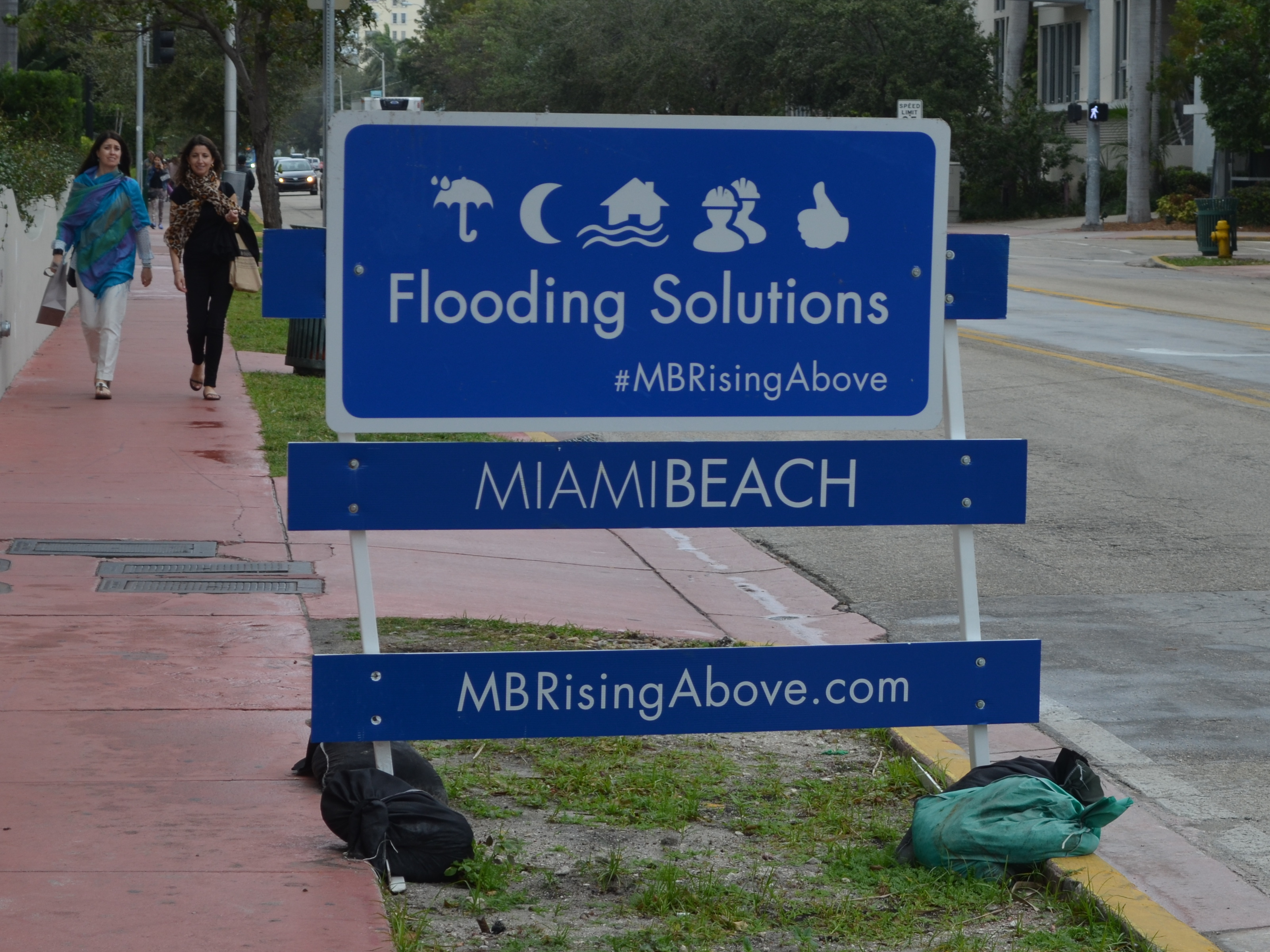
Sign near a project to raise the elevation of a roadway in South Beach

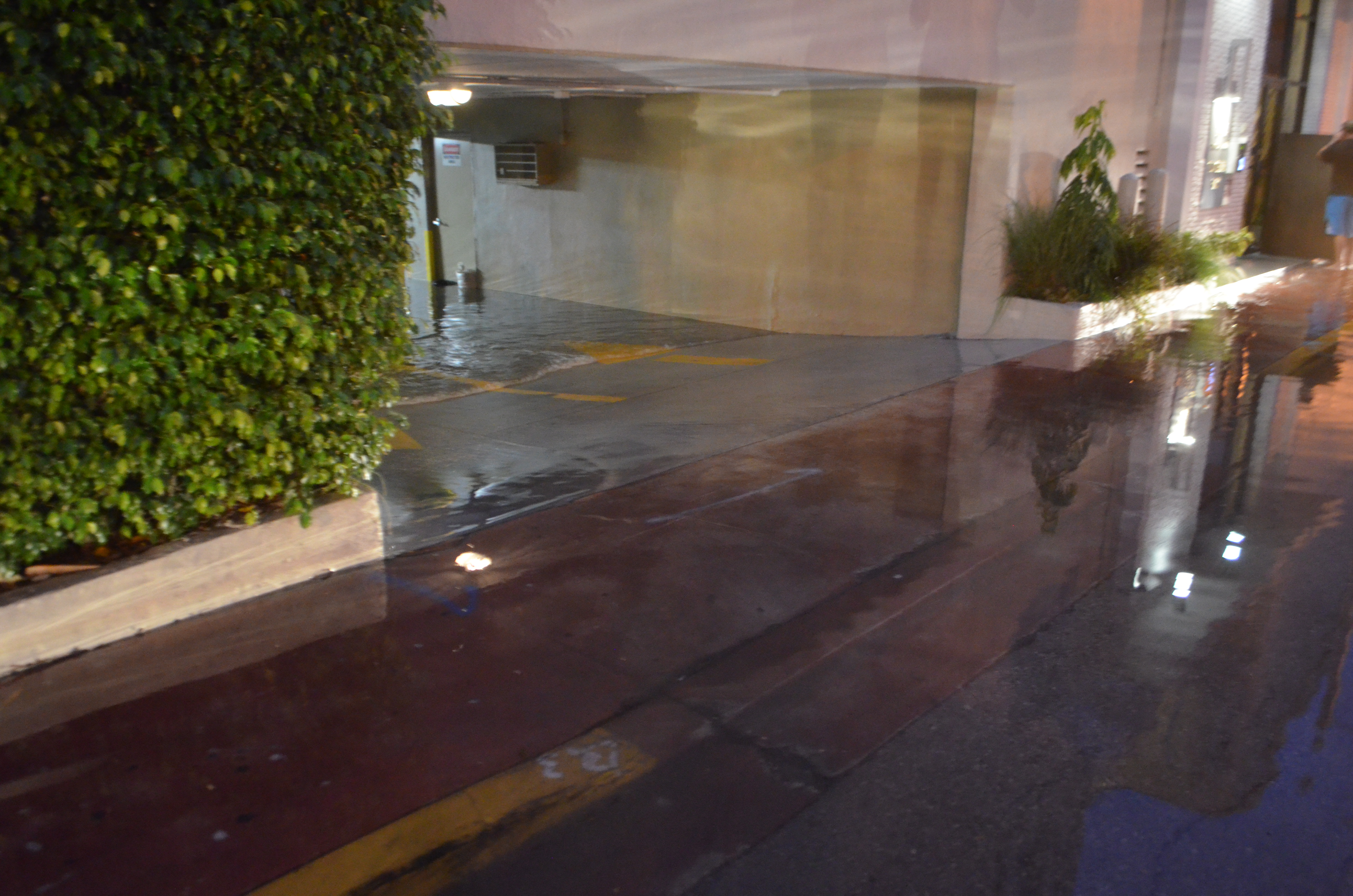
A high tide flood into a semi below grade carpark on the west side of South Beach, October 2016

Miami Beach encounters tidal flooding of certain roads during the annual king tides, though some tidal flooding has been the case for decades, as the parts of the western side of South Beach are at virtually 0 ft (0 m) above normal high tide, with the entire city averaging only 4.4 ft (1.3 m) above mean sea level (AMSL). However, a recent study by the University of Miami showed that tidal flooding became much more common from the mid-2000s. The fall 2015 king tides exceeded expectations in longevity and height. Traditional sea level rise and storm mitigation measures including sea walls and dykes, such as those in the Netherlands and New Orleans, may not work in South Florida due to the porous nature of the ground and limestone beneath the surface.

In addition to present difficulty with below-grade development, some areas of southern Florida, especially Miami Beach, are beginning to engineer specifically for sea level rise and other potential effects of climate change. This includes a five-year, US$500 million project for the installation of 60 to 80 pumps, building of taller sea walls, planting of red mangrove trees along the sea walls, and the physical raising of road tarmac levels, as well as possible zoning and building code changes, which could eventually lead to retrofitting of existing and historic properties. Some streets and sidewalks were raised about 2.5 ft (0.76 m) over previous levels; the four initial pumps installed in 2014 are capable of pumping 4,000 US gallons per minute. However, this plan is not without criticism. Some residents worry that the efforts will not be sufficient to successfully adapt to rising sea levels and wish the city had pursued a more aggressive plan.

On the other hand, some worry that the city is moving too quickly with untested solutions. Others yet have voiced concerns that the plan protects big-money interests in Miami Beach. Pump failures such as during construction or power outages, including a Tropical Storm Emily-related rain flood on August 1, 2017, can cause great unexpected flooding. Combined with the higher roads and sidewalks, this leaves unchanged properties relatively lower and prone to inundation.

=== Neighborhoods ===
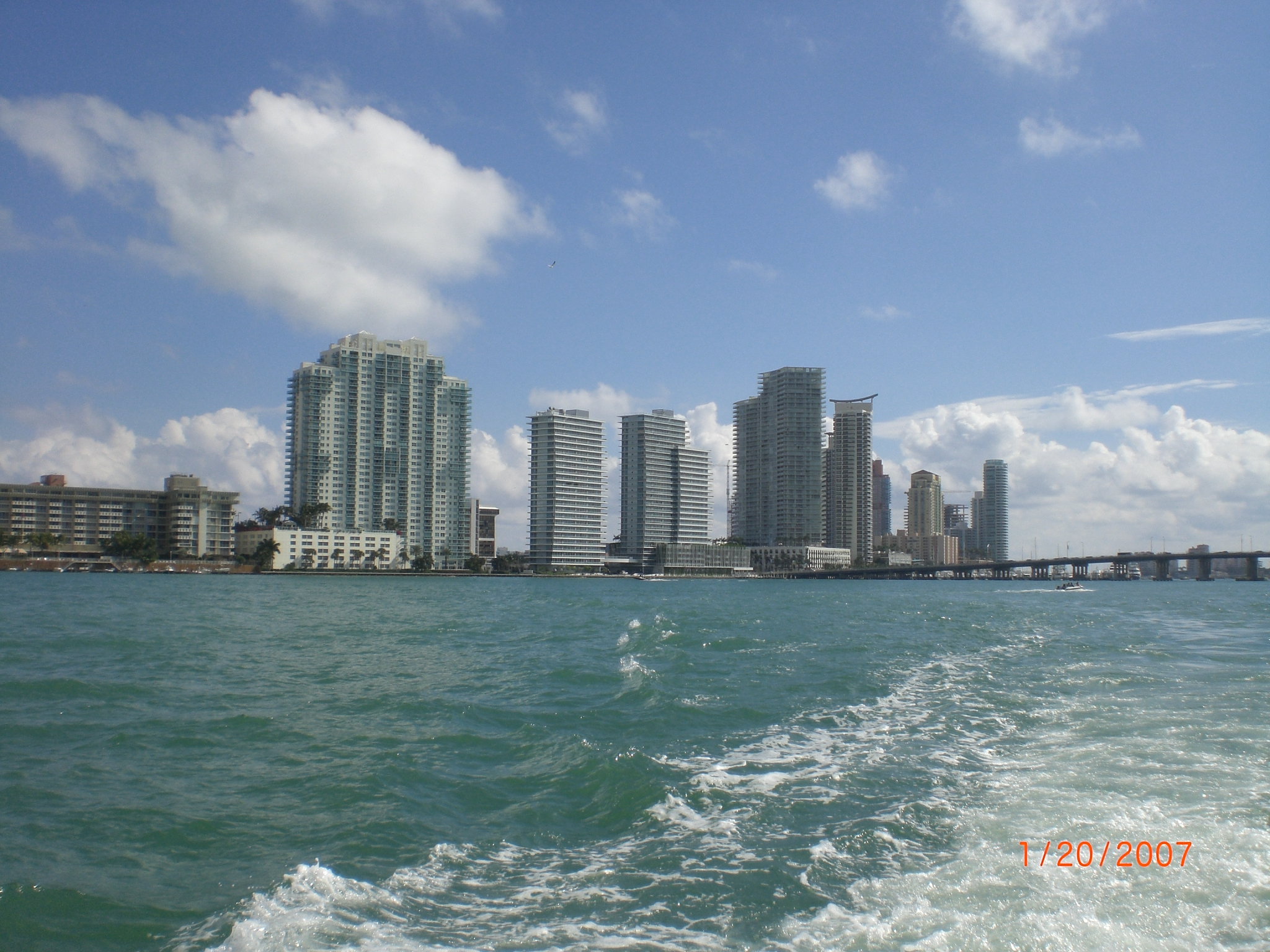
A portion of the southern part of the South Beach skyline as seen from Biscayne Bay. Photo: Marc Averette

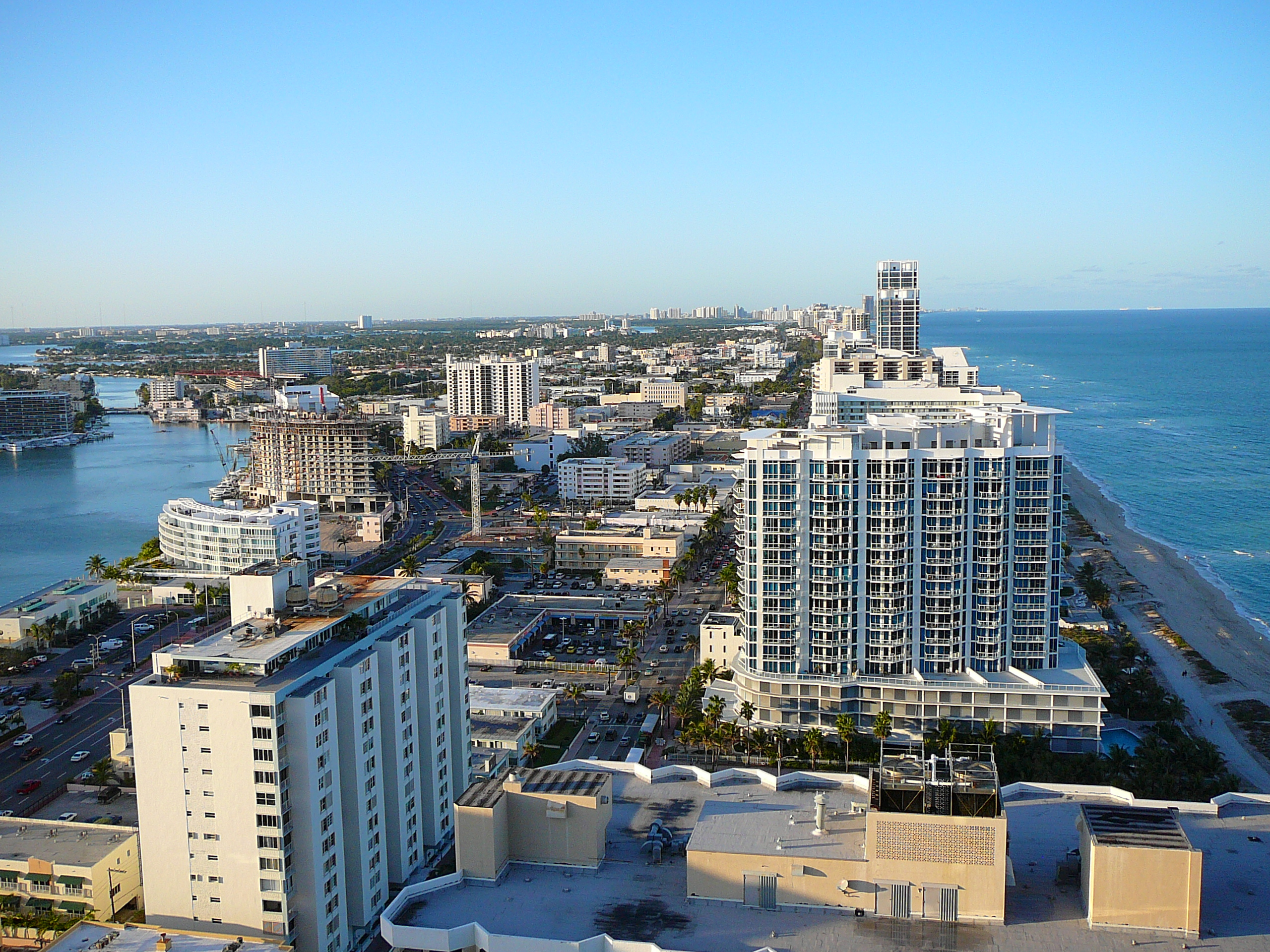
The northernmost section of the city, known as North Beach

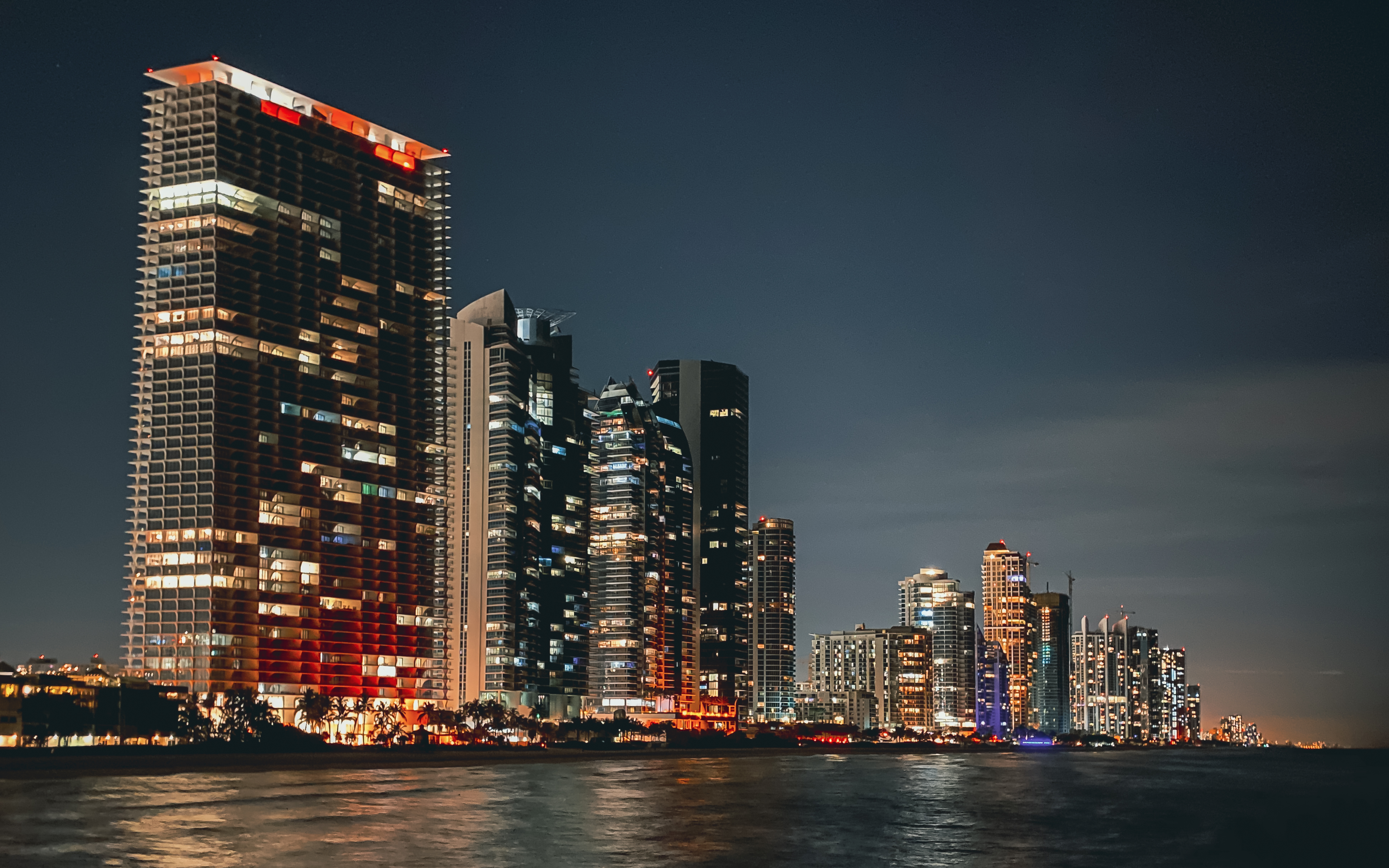
Sunny Isles Beach, 10 miles (16 km) north of Miami Beach, skyline at night from the ocean

==== South Beach ====
- Belle Isle
- City Center
- Di Lido Island
- Flagler Monument Island
- Flamingo/Lummus
- Hibiscus Island
- Palm Island
- Rivo Alto Island
- San Marino Island
- Star Island
- South of Fifth

==== Mid-Beach ====
- Oceanfront
- Bayshore
- Nautilus

==== North Beach ====
- Biscayne Point
- Isle of Normandy
- La Gorce
- North Shore

=== Climate ===
According to the Köppen climate classification, Miami Beach has a tropical monsoon climate (Am). Like much of Florida, there is a marked wet and dry season in Miami Beach. Rainfall amounts to about 1,700 millimetres (67 in) per year. The tropical rainy season runs from May through October, when showers and late day thunderstorms are common. The dry season is from November through April, when few showers, sunshine, and low humidity prevail. The island location of Miami Beach, however, creates fewer convective thunderstorms, so Miami Beach receives less rainfall in a given year than neighboring areas such as Miami and Fort Lauderdale. Proximity to the moderating influence of the Atlantic gives Miami Beach lower high temperatures and higher lows than inland areas of Florida. Miami Beach is in hardiness zone 11a, with an annual mean minimum temperature of 43 °F (6 °C). Miami Beach has never reported temperatures below 0 °C (32 °F).

Miami Beach's location on the Atlantic Ocean, near its confluence with the Gulf of Mexico, make it extraordinarily vulnerable to hurricanes and tropical storms. Miami has experienced several direct hits from major hurricanes in recorded weather history – the 1906 Florida Keys hurricane, 1926 Miami hurricane, 1935 Yankee hurricane, 1941 Florida hurricane, 1948 Miami Hurricane, 1950 Hurricane King and 1964 Hurricane Cleo, the area has seen indirect contact from hurricanes: 1945 Homestead Hurricane, Betsy (1965), Inez (1966), Andrew (1992), Irene (1999), Michelle (2001), Katrina (2005), Wilma (2005), and Irma (2017).

Climate data for Miami Beach, Florida, 1991–2020 normals, extremes 1927–2022
Month	Jan	Feb	Mar	Apr	May	Jun	Jul	Aug	Sep	Oct	Nov	Dec	Year
Record high °F (°C)	87 (31)	89 (32)	92 (33)	95 (35)	98 (37)	97 (36)	98 (37)	98 (37)	96 (36)	95 (35)	92 (33)	89 (32)	98 (37)
Mean maximum °F (°C)	82.5 (28.1)	83.1 (28.4)	85.0 (29.4)	87.1 (30.6)	89.0 (31.7)	91.1 (32.8)	91.9 (33.3)	92.6 (33.7)	91.1 (32.8)	89.3 (31.8)	85.6 (29.8)	83.0 (28.3)	93.9 (34.4)
Mean daily maximum °F (°C)	73.6 (23.1)	74.8 (23.8)	76.5 (24.7)	79.6 (26.4)	82.7 (28.2)	86.0 (30.0)	87.8 (31.0)	88.1 (31.2)	87.0 (30.6)	83.7 (28.7)	78.9 (26.1)	76.1 (24.5)	81.2 (27.3)
Daily mean °F (°C)	67.4 (19.7)	69.0 (20.6)	70.9 (21.6)	74.7 (23.7)	78.2 (25.7)	81.3 (27.4)	82.9 (28.3)	83.1 (28.4)	82.1 (27.8)	79.0 (26.1)	73.8 (23.2)	70.3 (21.3)	76.1 (24.5)
Mean daily minimum °F (°C)	61.2 (16.2)	63.3 (17.4)	65.2 (18.4)	69.8 (21.0)	73.6 (23.1)	76.5 (24.7)	78.0 (25.6)	78.1 (25.6)	77.2 (25.1)	74.4 (23.6)	68.6 (20.3)	64.6 (18.1)	70.9 (21.6)
Mean minimum °F (°C)	45.5 (7.5)	49.4 (9.7)	53.0 (11.7)	59.8 (15.4)	67.0 (19.4)	70.7 (21.5)	73.0 (22.8)	72.7 (22.6)	72.5 (22.5)	65.6 (18.7)	56.6 (13.7)	50.9 (10.5)	42.8 (6.0)
Record low °F (°C)	32 (0)	34 (1)	32 (0)	46 (8)	58 (14)	58 (14)	66 (19)	67 (19)	67 (19)	54 (12)	39 (4)	32 (0)	32 (0)
Average precipitation inches (mm)	2.33 (59)	2.27 (58)	2.47 (63)	3.44 (87)	4.94 (125)	7.76 (197)	5.98 (152)	7.51 (191)	8.45 (215)	6.49 (165)	3.29 (84)	2.25 (57)	57.18 (1,452)
Average precipitation days (≥ 0.01 in)	6.8	5.3	6.0	6.4	8.3	13.5	12.3	13.4	14.5	11.6	7.6	5.9	111.6
Source: NOAA

== Demographics ==
Historical population
Census	Pop.	Note	%±
1920	644		—
1930	6,494		908.4%
1940	28,012		331.4%
1950	46,282		65.2%
1960	63,145		36.4%
1970	87,072		37.9%
1980	96,298		10.6%
1990	92,639		−3.8%
2000	87,933		−5.1%
2010	87,779		−0.2%
2020	82,890		−5.6%
2023 (est.)	79,607	▼	−4.0%
U.S. Decennial Census; 1920–1970 1980 1990; 2000 2010 2020 2023

=== Racial and ethnic composition ===
Historical demographics	2020	2010	2000	1990	1980
White (non-Hispanic)	40.1%	40.5%	40.9%	48.3%	76.2%
Hispanic or Latino	50.6%	53.0%	53.4%	46.8%	22.2%
Black or African American (non-Hispanic)	2.7%	3.1%	2.8%	3.6%	0.7%
Asian and Pacific Islander (non-Hispanic)	2.0%	1.8%	1.3%	1.0%	0.9%
Native American (non-Hispanic)	0.1%	0.1%	0.1%	0.1%	0.9%
Some other race (non-Hispanic)	1.0%	0.4%	0.3%	0.2%	0.9%
Two or more races (non-Hispanic)	3.5%	1.1%	1.1%	N/A	N/A
Population	82,890	87,779	87,933	92,639	96,298

=== 2020 census ===
As of the 2020 census, Miami Beach had a population of 82,890. The median age was 44.0 years. 13.8% of residents were under the age of 18 and 19.0% of residents were 65 years of age or older. For every 100 females there were 105.9 males, and for every 100 females age 18 and over there were 106.3 males age 18 and over.

100.0% of residents lived in urban areas, while 0.0% lived in rural areas.

There were 43,297 households in Miami Beach, of which 16.5% had children under the age of 18 living in them. Of all households, 30.7% were married-couple households, 30.6% were households with a male householder and no spouse or partner present, and 31.4% were households with a female householder and no spouse or partner present. About 45.8% of all households were made up of individuals and 13.9% had someone living alone who was 65 years of age or older. The average household size was 1.30 people.

There were 63,543 housing units, of which 31.9% were vacant. The homeowner vacancy rate was 4.2% and the rental vacancy rate was 14.6%.

Racial composition as of the 2020 census
Race	Number	Percent
White	42,475	51.2%
Black or African American	2,573	3.1%
American Indian and Alaska Native	305	0.4%
Asian	1,688	2.0%
Native Hawaiian and Other Pacific Islander	34	0.0%
Some other race	8,754	10.6%
Two or more races	27,061	32.6%
Hispanic or Latino (of any race)	41,976	50.6%

=== Demographic characteristics ===
Demographic characteristics	2020	2010	2000	1990	1980
Housing units	63,543	67,499	59,723	49,305	55,685
Persons per household	1.30	1.30	1.47	1.88	1.73
Sex Ratio	105.9	109.9	105.0	87.3	74.7
Ages 0–17	13.8%	12.8%	13.4%	14.1%	8.7%
Ages 18–64	67.2%	71.0%	67.3%	55.8%	39.6%
Ages 65 +	19.0%	16.2%	19.2%	30.1%	51.8%
Median age	44.0	40.3	39.0	44.3	66.0
Population	82,890	87,779	87,933	92,639	96,298

=== Economic indicators ===
Economic indicators
2017–21 American Community Survey	Miami Beach	Miami-Dade County	Florida
Median income	$39,456	$32,513	$34,367
Median household income	$59,162	$57,815	$61,777
Poverty Rate	14.0%	15.7%	13.1%
High school diploma	89.9%	82.5%	89.0%
Bachelor's degree	49.6%	31.7%	31.5%
Advanced degree	22.0%	11.9%	11.7%

=== Languages ===
Language spoken at home (Note: Language spoken at home among residents at least five years old; only languages (or language groups) which at least 2% of residents have spoken at any time since 1980 are mentioned)	2015 (Note: Refers to 2013–2017 American Community Survey data; the last Decennial Census where language data was collected was in the 2000 census)	2010 (Note: Refers to 2008–2012 American Community Survey data; the last Decennial Census where language data was collected was in the 2000 census)	2000	1990	1980
English	30.8%	32.3%	32.5%	39.6%	54.6%
Spanish or Spanish Creole	55.5%	54.4%	54.4%	46.5%	23.0%
French or Haitian Creole	2.4%	2.3%	2.0%	2.3%	1.0%
Portuguese or Portuguese Creole	N/A (Note: Not counted separately; aggregated into "Other" category)	2.0%	3.4%	1.2%	N/A
Yiddish	N/A	0.1%	0.8%	3.1%	N/A
Other Languages	11.3%	8.9%	6.9%	7.3%	21.4%

=== Nativity ===
Nativity	2015 (Note: Refers to 2013–2017 American Community Survey data; the last Decennial Census where foreign-born population data was collected was in the 2000 census)	2010 (Note: Refers to 2008–2012 American Community Survey data; the last Decennial Census where foreign-born population data was collected was in the 2000 census)	2000	1990	1980
% population native-born	45.4%	48.0%	44.5%	48.7%	51.3%
... born in the United States	44.3%	44.6%	40.7%	44.8%	50.0%
... born in Puerto Rico or Island Areas	1.1%	1.9%	2.8%	2.9%	1.3%
... born to American parents abroad	1.5%	1.5%	1.0%	1.0%	1.3%
% population foreign-born (Note: Only countries of birth which at least 2% of residents were born in at any time since 1980 are mentioned)	53.0%	52.0%	55.5%	51.3%	48.7%
... born in Cuba	14.8%	14.7%	17.5%	18.0%	10.7%
... born in Russia	0.7%	0.7%	0.5%	1.9% (Note: Data from the 1980 census and 1990 census pertains to residents born anywhere in the Soviet Union, not just Russia)	9.3%
... born in Poland	0.4%	0.4%	0.7%	2.1%	5.9%
... born in Colombia	4.1%	4.0%	5.9%	3.4%	N/A
... born in Argentina	4.1%	3.4%	4.4%	1.6%	N/A
... born in Brazil	2.1%	1.9%	3.1%	1.2%	N/A
... born in Peru	1.9%	2.2%	2.5%	1.6%	N/A
... born in Guatemala	1.0%	2.6%	0.4%	0.5%	N/A
... born in Honduras	1.9%	2.0%	1.3%	1.2%	N/A
... born in Venezuela	3.4%	2.1%	1.7%	0.7%	N/A
... born in other countries	18.6%	18.0%	17.5%	19.1%	22.8%

=== 2010 census ===
As of 2010, those of Hispanic or Latino ancestry accounted for 53.0% of Miami Beach's population. Out of the 53.0%, 20.0% were Cuban, 4.9% Colombian, 4.6% Argentine, 3.7% Puerto Rican, 2.4% Peruvian, 2.1% Venezuelan, 1.8% Mexican, 1.7% Honduran, 1.6% Guatemalan, 1.4% Dominican, 1.1% Uruguayan, 1.1% Spaniard, 1.0% Nicaraguan, 0.9% Ecuadorian and 0.8% were Chilean.

As of 2010, those of African ancestry accounted for 4.4% of Miami Beach's population, which includes African Americans. Out of the 4.4%, 1.3% were Black Hispanics, 0.8% were Subsaharan African, and 0.8% were West Indian or Afro-Caribbean American (0.3% Jamaican, 0.3% Haitian, 0.1% Other or Unspecified West Indian, 0.1% Trinidadian and Tobagonian.)

As of 2010, those of (non-Hispanic white) European ancestry accounted for 40.5% of Miami Beach's population. Out of the 40.5%, 9.0% Italian, 6.0% German, 3.8% were Irish, 3.8% Russian, 3.7% French, 3.4% Polish, 3.0% British, 1.2% Hungarian, 0.7% Swedish, 0.6%, 0.5% Portuguese, 0.5% Dutch, 0.5% Spanish, and 0.5% were Norwegian.

As of 2010, those of Asian ancestry accounted for 1.9% of Miami Beach's population. Out of the 1.9%, 0.6% were Indian, 0.5% Pakistani, 0.4% Filipino, 0.3% Other Asian, 0.3% Chinese, 0.1% Japanese, 0.1% Korean, and 0.1% were Vietnamese.

In 2010, 2.8% of the population considered themselves to be of only American ancestry (regardless of race or ethnicity), and 1.5% were of Arab ancestry (with the majority of them being of Palestinian, and Lebanese descent), as of 2010.

As of 2010, there were 67,499 households, while 30.1% were vacant. 13.8% had children under the age of 18 living with them, 26.3% were married couples living together, 8.4% had a female householder with no husband present, and 61.1% were non-families. 49.0% of all households were made up of individuals, and 12.0% had someone living alone who was 65 years of age or older (4.0% male and 8.0% female.) The average household size was 1.84 and the average family size was 2.70.

== Economy ==
=== Tourism ===
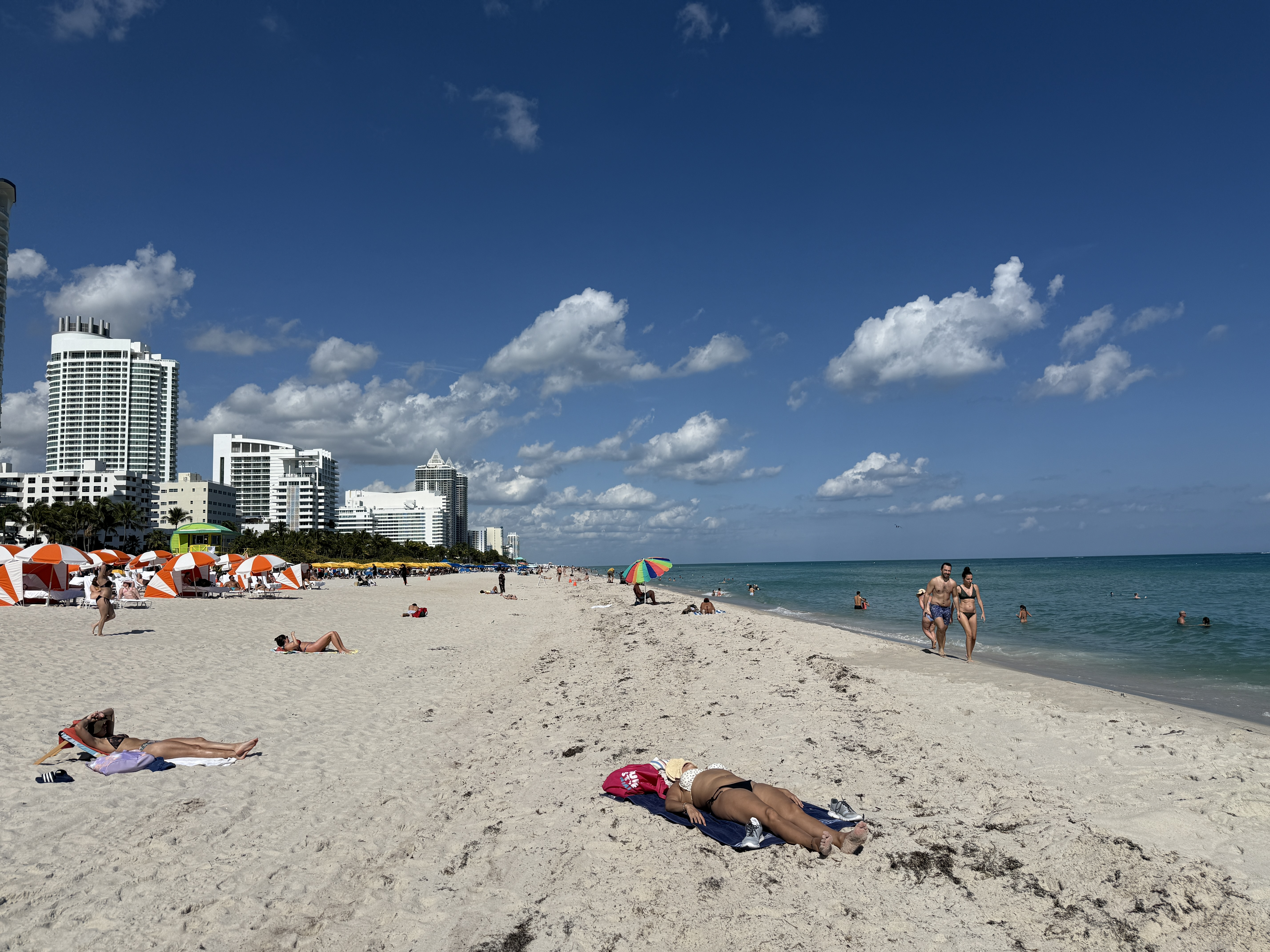
Miami Beach at 40th Street

The City of Miami Beach accounts for more than half of tourism to Miami-Dade County. Of the 15.86 million people staying in the county in 2017, 58.5% lodged in Miami Beach. Resort taxes account for over 10% of the city's operating budget, providing $83 million in the fiscal year 2016–2017. On average, the city's resort tax revenue grows by three to five percent annually. Miami Beach hosts 13.3 million visitors each year. In fiscal year 2016/2017, Miami Beach had over 26,600 hotel rooms. Average occupancy in fiscal year 2015/2016 was 76.4% and 78.5% in fiscal year 2016/2017. Mayor Harold Rosen is credited with beginning the revitalization of Miami Beach when he notably abolished rent control in 1976, a move that was highly controversial at the time.

=== The Miami Beach Visitor and Convention Authority ===
The Miami Beach Visitor and Convention Authority is a seven-member board, appointed by the City of Miami Beach Commission. The authority, established in 1967 by the State of Florida legislature, is the official marketing and public relations organization for the city, to support its tourism industry.

== Arts and culture ==
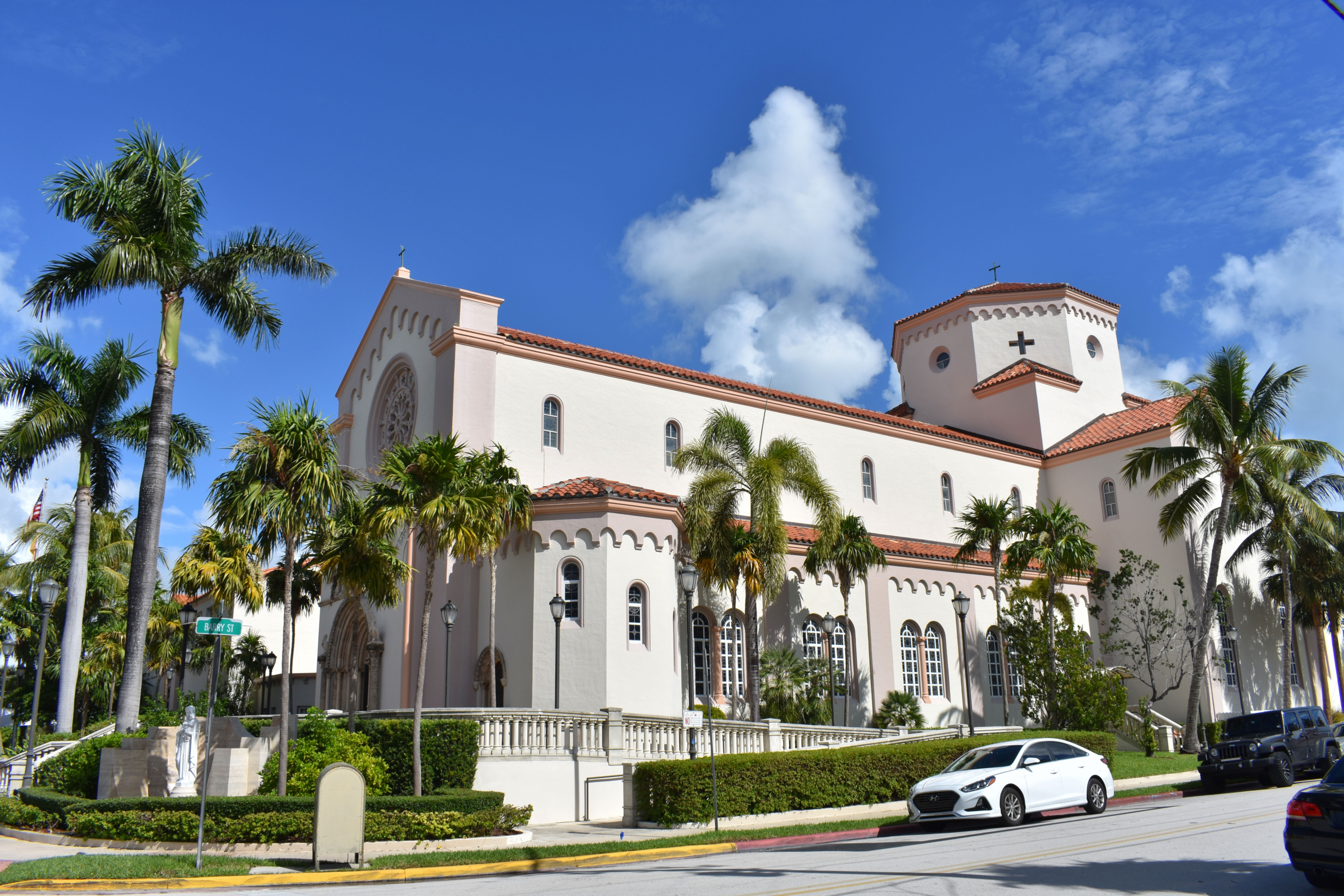
St. Patrick Catholic Church, Miami Beach

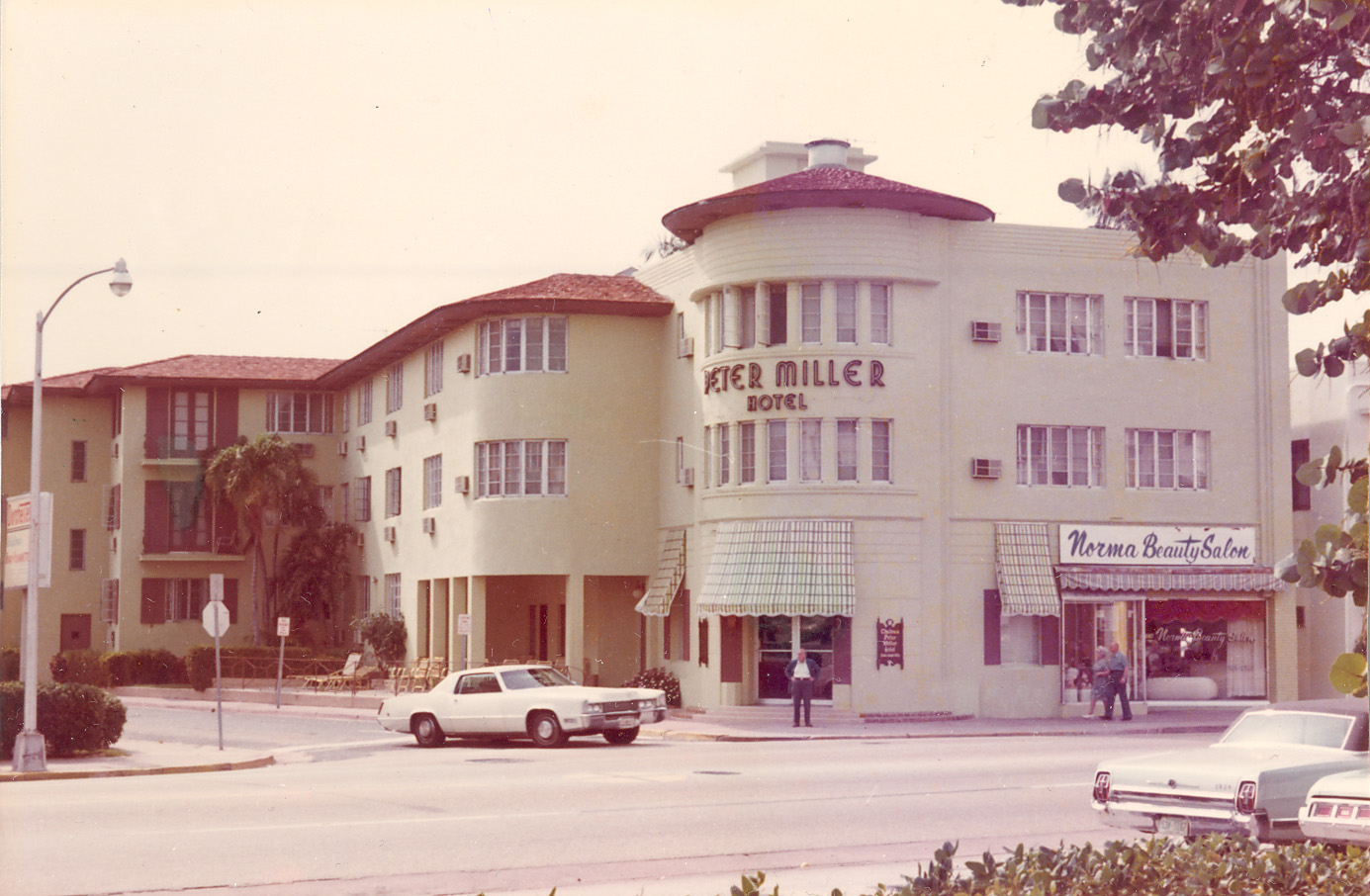
Hotel at 19th and Collins in 1973

South Beach (also known as SoBe, or simply the Beach), the area from Biscayne Street (also known as South Pointe Drive) one block south of 1st Street to about 23rd Street, is one of the more popular areas of Miami Beach. Although topless sunbathing by women has not been officially legalized, female toplessness is tolerated on South Beach and in a few hotel pools on Miami Beach. Before the TV show Miami Vice helped make the area popular, SoBe was under urban blight, with vacant buildings and a high crime rate. Today, it is considered one of the richest commercial areas on the beach, yet poverty and crime still remain in some places near the area.

Miami Beach, particularly Ocean Drive of what is now the Art Deco District, was also featured prominently in the 1983 feature film Scarface and the 1996 comedy The Birdcage.

Lincoln Road, running east–west parallel between 16th and 17th Streets, is a nationally known spot for outdoor dining and shopping and features galleries of well known designers, artists and photographers such as Romero Britto, Peter Lik, and Jonathan Adler. In 2015, the Miami Beach residents passed a law forbidding bicycling, rollerblading, skateboarding and other motorized vehicles on Lincoln Road during busy pedestrian hours between 9:00 am and 2:00 am.

=== Points of interest ===
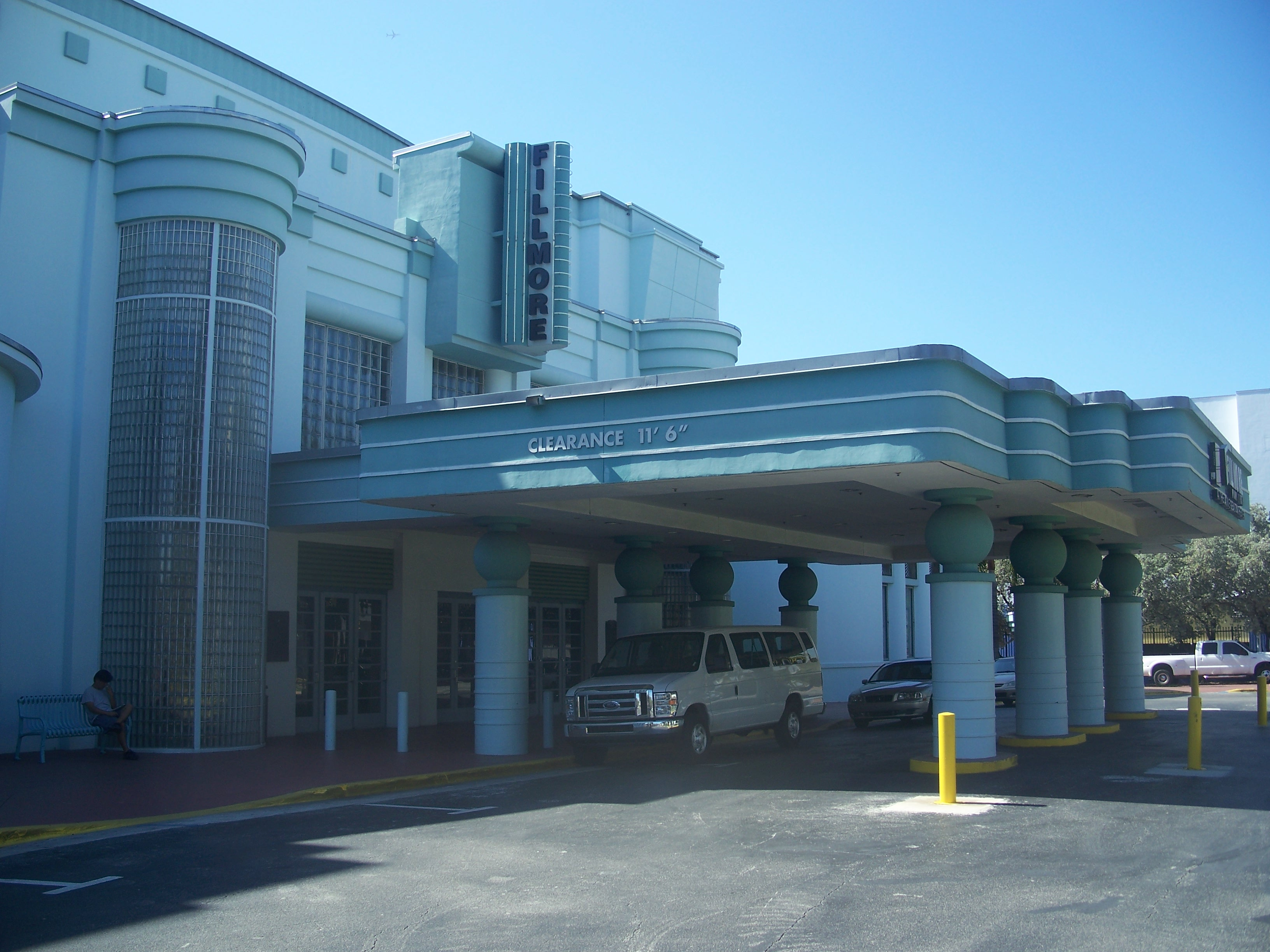
The Fillmore, April 2011

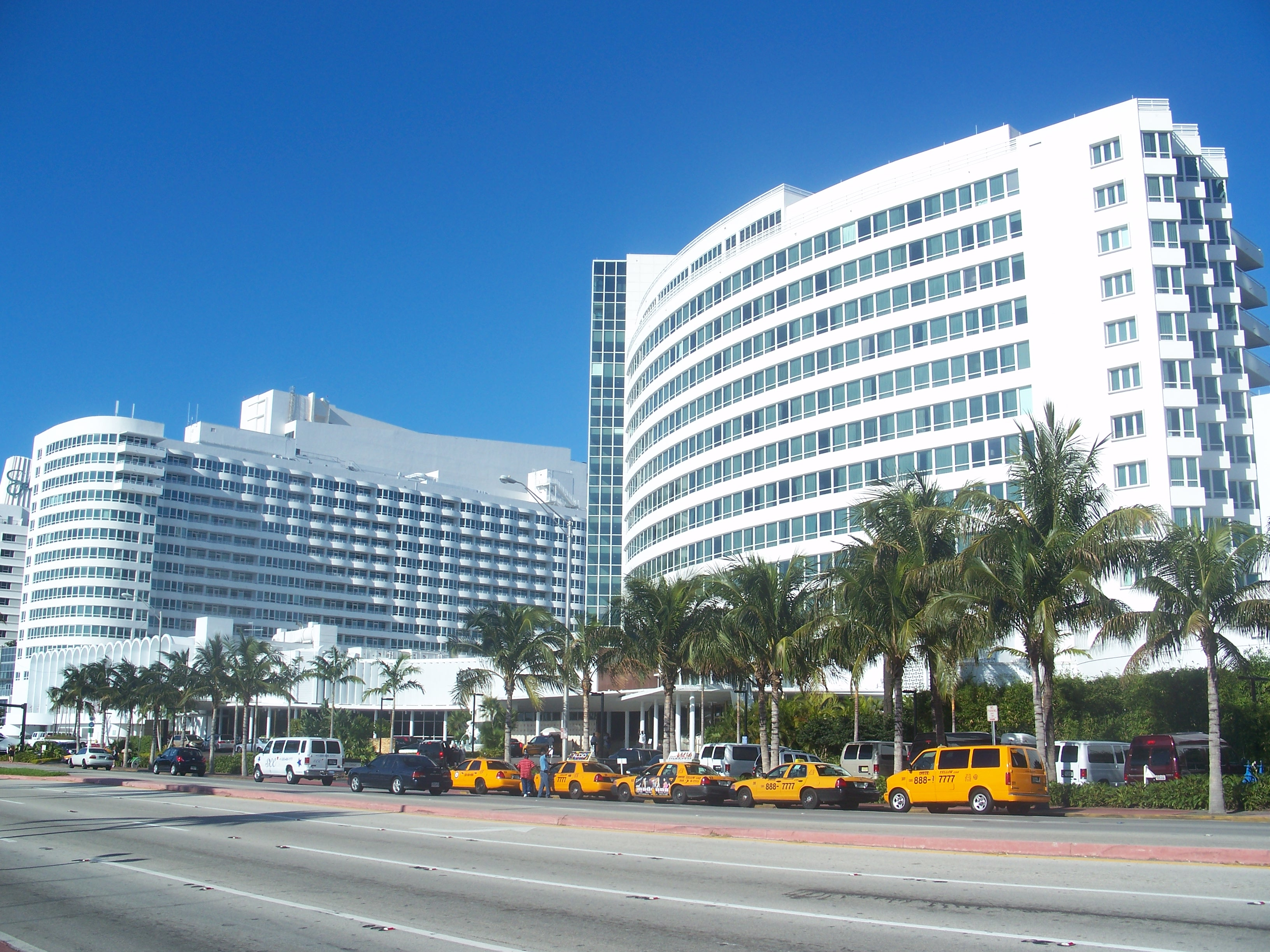
Fontainebleau Miami Beach, April 2011

- Bass Museum
- Eden Roc Miami Beach Hotel
- The Fillmore Miami Beach (originally the Miami Beach Municipal Auditorium)
- Flagler Monument Island
- Fontainebleau Hotel
- Versace Mansion (Casa Casuarina)
- Holocaust Memorial
- Jewish Museum of Florida
- Lincoln Road
- Miami Beach Architectural District
- Miami Beach Botanical Garden
- North Beach
- Ocean Drive
- South Beach
- South Pointe Park
- Wolfsonian-FIU Museum
- World Erotic Art Museum Miami
- The Setai Hotel

=== Historic preservation ===
Map of Miami Beach historic districts as of January 17, 2018.

By the 1970s, jet travel had enabled vacationers from the northern parts of the US to travel to the Caribbean and other warm-weather climates in the winter. Miami Beach's economy suffered. Elderly retirees, many with little money, dominated the population of South Beach.

To help revive the area, city planners and developers sought to bulldoze many of the aging art deco buildings that were built in the 1930s. By one count, the city had over 800 art deco buildings within its borders.

In 1976, Barbara Baer Capitman and a group of fellow activists formed the Miami Design Preservation League (MDPL) to try to halt the destruction of the historic buildings in South Beach. After battling local developers and Washington DC bureaucrats, MDPL prevailed in its quest to have the Miami Beach Art Deco District named to the National Register of Historic Places in 1979. While the recognition did not offer protection for the buildings from demolition, it succeeded in drawing attention to the plight of the buildings.

Due in part to the newfound awareness of the art deco buildings, vacationers, tourists and TV, and movie crews were drawn to South Beach. Investors began to rehabilitate hotels, restaurants and apartment buildings in the area.

Despite the enthusiasm for the historic buildings by many, there were no real protections for historic buildings. As wrecking crews threatened buildings, MDPL members protested by holding marches and candlelight vigils. In one case, protestors stood in front of a hotel blocking bulldozers as they approached a hotel.

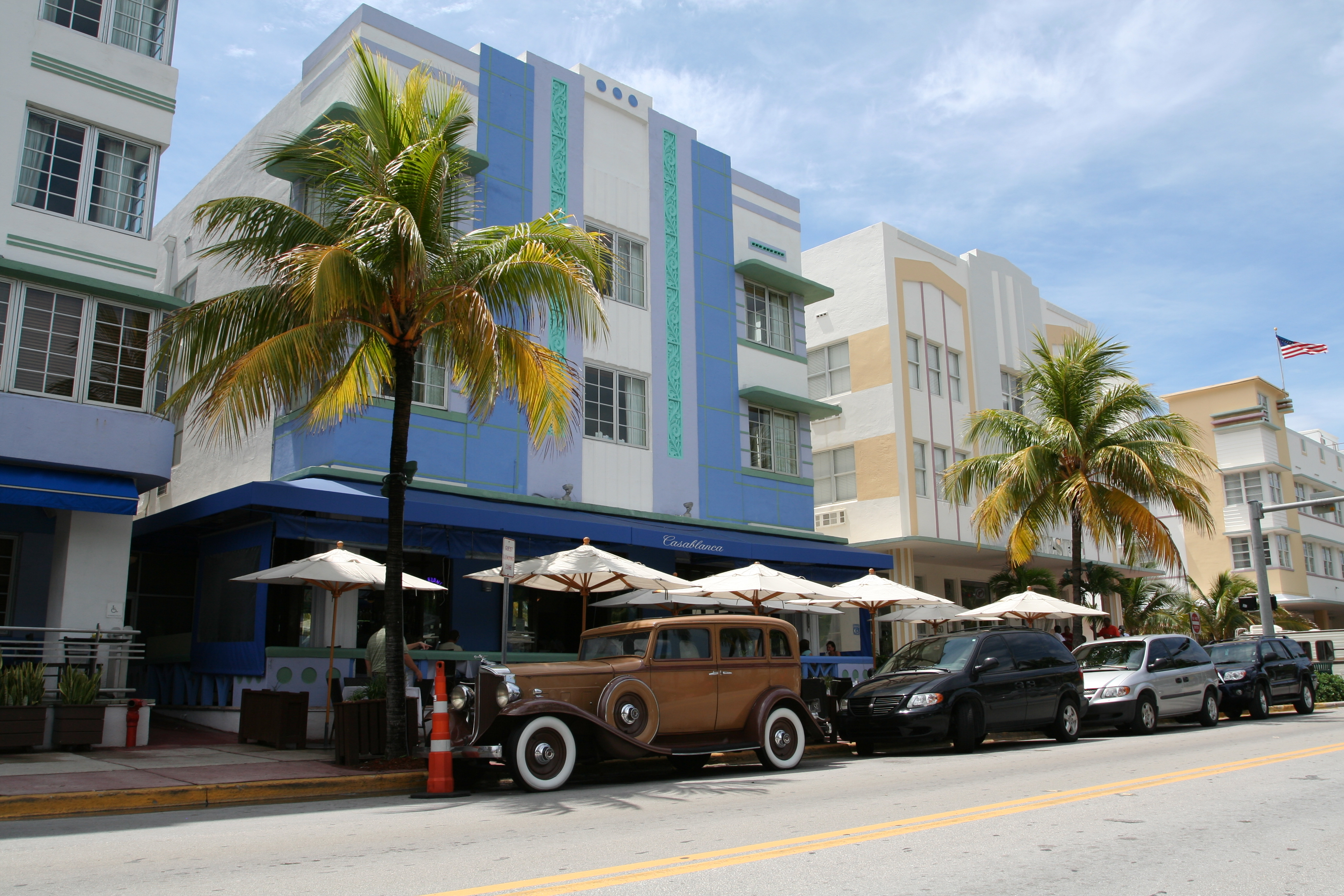
Many Art Deco style hotels are located on Ocean Drive

After many years of effort, the Miami Beach city commission created the first two historic preservation districts in 1986. The districts covered Espanola Way and most of Ocean Drive and Collins Avenue in South Beach. The designation of the districts helped protect buildings from demolition and created standards for renovation.

While some developers continued to focus on demolition, several investors like Tony Goldman and Ian Schrager bought art deco hotels and transformed them into world famous hot spots in the ‘80s and ‘90s. Among the celebrities that frequented Miami Beach were Madonna, Sylvester Stallone, Cher, Oprah Winfrey and Gianni Versace.

Additional historic districts were created in 1992. The new districts covered Lincoln Road, Collins Avenue between 16th and 22nd Streets and the area around the Bass Museum. In 2005, the city began the process of protecting the mid-century buildings on Collins Avenue between 43rd to 53rd Streets including the Fontainebleau and Eden Roc Hotels. Several North Beach neighborhoods were designated as historic in 2018. A large collection of MiMo (Miami Modern) buildings can be found in the area.

=== The arts ===
Jackie Gleason hosted his Jackie Gleason and His American Scene Magazine (September 29, 1962 – June 4, 1966) television show, after moving it from New York to Miami Beach in 1964, reportedly because he liked year-round access to the golf course at the nearby Inverrary Country Club in Lauderhill (where he built his final home). His closing line became, almost invariably, "As always, the Miami Beach audience is the greatest audience in the world!" In the Fall 1966 television season, he abandoned the American Scene Magazine format and converted the show into a standard variety hour with guest performers. The show was renamed The Jackie Gleason Show, lasting from September 17, 1966 – September 12, 1970. He started the 1966–1967 season with new, color episodes of The Honeymooners, with Sheila MacRae and Jane Kean as Alice Kramden and Trixie Norton, respectively. The regular cast included Art Carney as Ed Norton; Milton Berle was a frequent guest star. The show was shot in color on videotape at the Miami Beach Auditorium (later renamed the Jackie Gleason Theatre of the Performing Arts), now known as Fillmore Miami Beach, and Gleason never tired of promoting the "sun and fun capital of the world" on camera. CBS canceled the series in 1970.

Each December, the City of Miami Beach hosts Art Basel Miami Beach, one of the largest art shows in the United States. Art Basel Miami Beach, the sister event to the Art Basel event held each June in Basel, Switzerland, combines an international selection of top galleries with a program of special exhibitions, parties and crossover events featuring music, film, architecture, and design. Exhibition sites are located in the city's Art Deco District, and ancillary events are scattered throughout the greater Miami metropolitan area.

The first Art Basel Miami Beach was held in 2002. In 2016, about 77,000 people attended the fair. The 2017 show featured about 250 galleries at the Miami Beach Convention Center.

Miami Beach is home to the New World Symphony, established in 1987 under the artistic direction of Michael Tilson Thomas. In January 2011, the New World Symphony made a highly publicized move into the New World Center building designed by Canadian American Pritzker Prize-winning architect Frank Gehry. Gehry is famous for his design of the Guggenheim Museum in Bilbao, Spain, and the Walt Disney Concert Hall in Los Angeles, California. The new Gehry building offers Live Wallcasts™, which allow visitors to experience select events throughout the season at the half-acre, outdoor Miami Beach SoundScape through the use of visual and audio technology on a 7,000 sq ft (650 m^{2}) projection wall.

Miami beach is also home to Miami New Drama, the resident theater company at the historic Colony Theatre on Lincoln Road. The regional theater company was founded in 2016 by Venezuelan playwright and director, Michel Hausmann, and playwright, director, and Medal of the Arts winner, Moises Kaufman. In October 2016, Miami New Drama took over operations of the Colony Theatre, and since then, the 417-seat Art Deco venue hosts Miami New Drama's theatrical season as well as other live events.

The Miami City Ballet, a ballet company founded in 1985, is housed in a 63,000 sq ft (5,900 m^{2}) building near Miami Beach's Bass Museum of Art.

The Miami Beach Festival of the Arts is an annual outdoor art festival that was begun in 1974.

=== Jewish community ===
Miami Beach is home to several Orthodox Jewish communities with a network of well-established synagogues and yeshivas, the first of which being the Landow Yeshiva, a Chabad institution in operation for over 30 years. There is also a liberal Jewish community containing such famous synagogues as Temple Emanu-El, Temple Beth Shalom and Cuban Hebrew Congregation. Miami Beach is also a magnet for Jewish families, retirees, and particularly snowbirds when the cold winter sets into the north. These visitors range from the Modern Orthodox to the Haredi and Hasidic – including many rebbes who vacation there during the North American winter. Till his death in 1991, the Nobel laureate writer Isaac Bashevis Singer lived in the northern end of Miami Beach and breakfasted often at Sheldon's drugstore on Harding Avenue.

There are many kosher restaurants and even kollels for post-graduate Talmudic scholars, such as the Miami Beach Community Kollel. Miami Beach had roughly 60,000 people in Jewish households (62 percent of the total population) in 1982, but only 16,500 (19 percent of the population) in 2004, according to Ira Sheskin, a demographer at the University of Miami who conducts surveys once a decade. The Miami Beach Jewish community had decreased in size by 1994 due to migration to wealthier areas and aging of the population.

Miami Beach is home to the Holocaust Memorial of the Greater Miami Jewish Federation.

=== LGBT community ===
Miami Beach has been regarded as a gay mecca for decades as well as being one of the most LGBT friendly cities in the United States. Miami Beach is home to numerous gay bars and gay-specific events, and five service and resource organizations. After decades of economic and social decline, an influx of gays and lesbians moving to South Beach in the late-1980s to mid-1990s contributed to Miami Beach's revitalization. The newcomers purchased and restored dilapidated Art Deco hotels and clubs, started numerous businesses and built political power in city and county government.

The passage of progressive civil rights laws, election of outspokenly pro-gay Miami Beach Mayor Matti Bower, and the introduction of Miami Beach's Gay Pride Celebration, have reinvigorated the local LGBT community in recent years, which some argued had experienced a decline in the late 2000s. In January 2010, Miami Beach passed a revised Human Rights Ordinance that strengthens enforcement of already existing human rights laws and adds protections for transgender people, making Miami Beach's human rights laws some of the most progressive in the state.

Miami Beach Pride has gained prominence since it first started in 2009, there has been an increase in attendance every year. In 2013 there were more than 80,000 people who participated to now more than 130,000 people that participate in the festivities every year. It has also attracted many celebrities such as Chaz Bono, Adam Lambert, Gloria Estefan, Mario Lopez, and Elvis Duran who were Grand Marshals for Pride Weekend from 2012 through 2016 respectively. There are over 125 businesses who are LGBT supportive that sponsor Miami Beach Pride.

== Government ==
Miami Beach is governed by a ceremonial mayor and six commissioners. Although the mayor runs commission meetings, the mayor and all commissioners have equal voting power and are elected by popular election. The mayor serves for terms of two years with a term limit of three terms and commissioners serve for terms of four years and are limited to two terms. Commissioners are voted for citywide and every two years three commission seats are voted upon.

Appointed offices in the city include the City Manager, City Clerk and the City Attorney are also appointed officials.

In Miami Beach, city manager is responsible for administering governmental operations. An appointed city manager is responsible for administration of the city.

== Education ==
Miami-Dade County Public Schools serves Miami Beach.

- North Beach Elementary
- Treasure Island Elementary
- South Pointe Elementary
- Mater Beach Academy
- Biscayne Elementary
- Fienberg/Fisher K–8 Center
- Nautilus Middle School
- Miami Beach Senior High School

Private schools include Rabbi Alexander S. Gross Hebrew Academy, St. Patrick Catholic School, Landow Yeshiva – Lubavitch Educational Center (Klurman Mesivta High School for Boys and Beis Chana Middle and High School for Girls), and Mechina High School. The Roman Catholic Archdiocese of Miami operates St. Patrick Catholic School in Miami Beach. The archdiocese formerly operated Saint Joseph School in Miami Beach.

In the early history of Miami Beach, there was one elementary school and the Ida M. Fisher junior-senior high school. The building of Miami Beach High was constructed in 1926, and classes began in 1928.

=== Colleges and universities ===
The Florida International University School of Architecture has a sister campus at 420 Lincoln Road in South Beach, with classroom spaces for FIU architecture, art, music and theater graduate students.

Other Colleges include:

- Johnson & Wales University (satellite campus closing at the end of the 2020–2021 school year.)

== Infrastructure ==
=== Public transportation ===
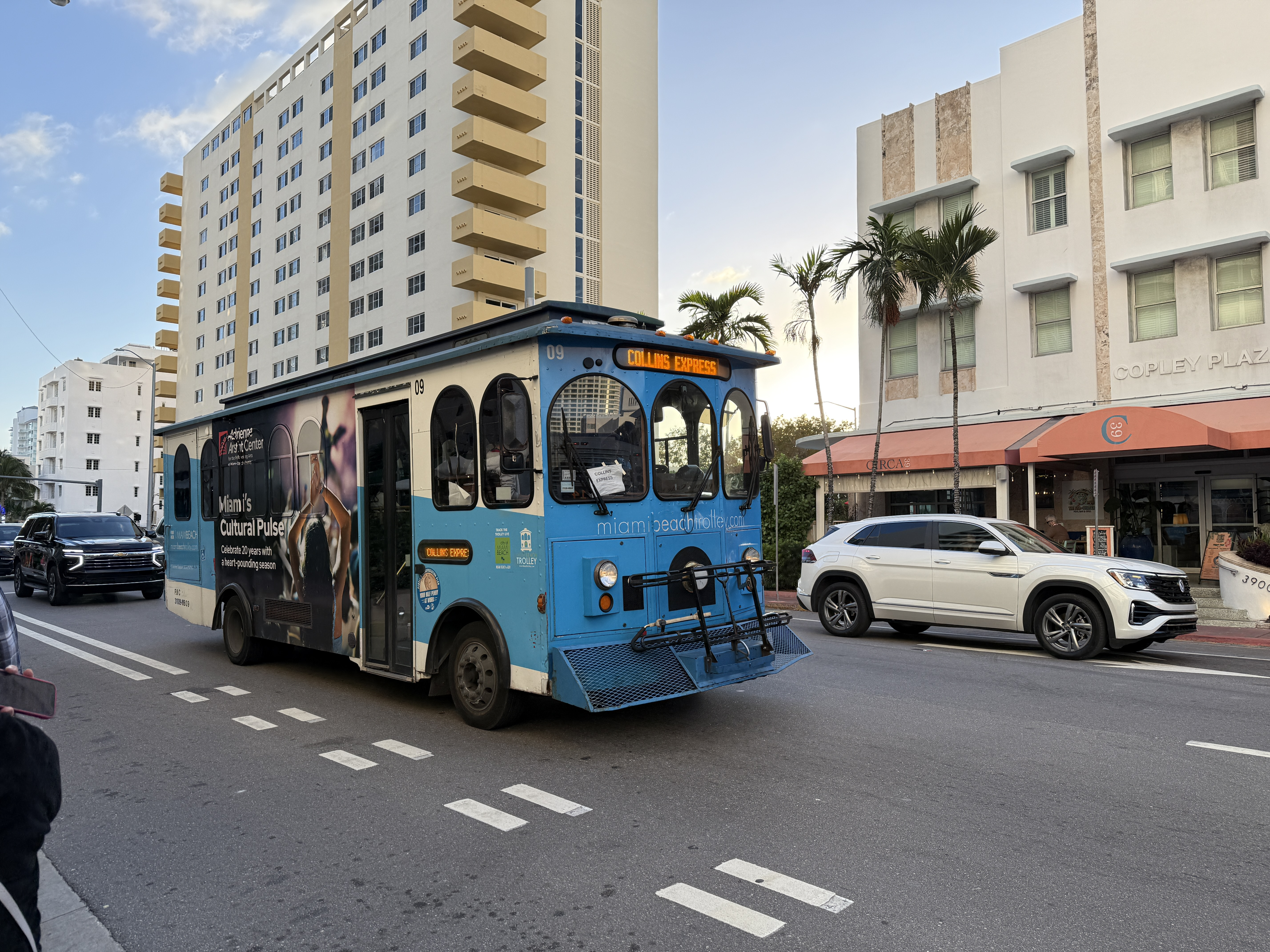
Miami Beach Trolley

Public transportation in Miami Beach is operated by Miami-Dade Transit (MDT). Along with neighborhoods such as Downtown and Brickell, public transit is heavily used in Miami Beach and is a vital part of city life. Although Miami Beach has no direct Metrorail stations, numerous Metrobus lines connect to Downtown Miami and Metrorail, such as the 100 bus route, which connects Downtown Miami to Aventura Mall via Miami Beach and is the busiest bus route on the network with over 16,000 riders on weekdays.

A rail connection to Miami Beach from the mainland, called BayLink in planning documents, has been discussed for decades and was included as a planned line in the 2002 People's Transportation Plan (PTP) passed by voters in November 2002. Again in 2016, the line was included as part of the Strategic Miami Area Rapid Transit (SMART) plan, which included the line as part of the longer Beach Corridor, which would connect South Beach to Wynwood or the Design District and to existing Metromover services. The project has since been delayed by casino giant Genting Group proposing a monorail in 2019, then the county scrapping those plans in favor of a Metromover expansion in 2022 over local opposition from the City of Miami Beach commission, primarily driven by wealthy Miami Beach residents. While some residents are opposed to the Metromover extension, a survey published by the Miami Herald in June 2025 found that 79% of Miami Beach residents support the extension.

The city of Miami Beach operates the Miami Beach Trolley, a free tourist trolley system that consists of four routes: the South Beach Loop, the Middle Beach Loop, the Collins Express, and the North Beach Loop.

==== Bicycling ====
Since the late 20th century, cycling has grown in popularity in Miami Beach. Due to its dense, urban nature, and pedestrian-friendly streets, many Miami Beach residents get around by bicycle.

In March 2011 a public bicycle sharing system named Citi Bike Miami was launched, one of only a handful of such programs in the United States. The program is operated by a private corporation, Decobike, LLC, but is partnered with the City of Miami Beach in a revenue-sharing model. As of 2020, the Citi Bike program operates between the cities of Miami and Miami Beach with over 160 stations and approximately 2,000 bicycles.

== Notable people ==
- George Abbott (1887–1995), playwright, screenwriter, producer, and director
- George Ade (1866–1944), writer
- Moses Annenberg (1877–1942), Prussia-born American newspaper publisher
- Desi Arnaz (1917–1986), Cuban-American entertainer
- Bora Aydınlık (born 2005), soccer player
- David Beckham (born 1975), footballer and co-owner of Inter Miami CF
- Victoria Beckham (born 1974), fashion designer and singer
- Shmuley Boteach (born 1966), Orthodox rabbi, radio and television host, and author
- Walter Briggs, Sr. (1877–1952), entrepreneur, owner of the Detroit Tigers
- Sergey Brin (born 1973), Google co-founder
- Douglas Isaac Busch (born 1951), photographer and teacher
- Barbara Baer Capitman (1920–1990), historic preservation activist, writer
- Al Capone (1899–1947), mobster
- David Caruso (born 1956), actor and producer
- Sean Combs (born 1969), rapper and record executive
- John S. Collins, horticulturist
- Kent Cooper, Associated Press executive director
- James M. Cox, Governor of Ohio and presidential candidate
- Andrew Cunanan, serial killer
- Matt Damon (born 1970), actor
- Ron Dermer (born 1971), Israeli Ambassador to the US
- Vladislav Doronin (born 1962), real estate developer
- Robert Epstein (1928–2024), anesthesiologist and professor
- Emilio Estefan (born 1953), music producer
- Gloria Estefan (born 1957), singer
- Harvey Firestone, Firestone Tires founder
- Carl Graham Fisher, developer of Miami Beach
- Rayni Fox (born 1956), tennis player
- Miriam Freund-Rosenthal (1906–1999), civic leader
- Phillip Frost (born 1936), businessman and philanthropist
- Future (born 1983), rapper
- Frank Gannett (1876–1957), Gannett Media Corporation founder
- Barry Gibb (born 1946), British singer, songwriter, musician (Bee Gees)
- Jackie Gleason, comedian, actor, TV host
- Jim Goetz (born 1966), venture capitalist, Sequoia Capital
- Tony Goldman, real estate developer
- Ronald Green (1944–2012), American-Israeli basketball player
- Ken Griffin (born 1968), founder of Citadel LLC
- David Grutman (born 1974), nightlife and hospitality entrepreneur
- Gabriel Heatter (1890–1972), radio commentator
- Jacob Helberg, technology policy adviser
- Jerry Herman, Broadway composer
- John D. Hertz (born Sándor Herz, 1879–1961), Hertz Rental Cars chairman
- Henry Hohauser (1895–1963), architect
- Bill Hurst (born 1970), Major League Baseball pitcher
- Nunnally Johnson (1897–1977), film director
- Josignacio (born 1963), Cuban artist
- DJ Khaled (born 1975), record producer and DJ
- Larry King (born Lawrence Harvey Zeiger; 1933–2021), author, radio host, and TV host
- S.S. Kresge (1867–1966), retailer
- Hedy Lamarr (born Hedwig Eva Maria Kiesler; 1914–2000), Austrian-born American actress and inventor
- Meyer Lansky (born Maier Suchowljansky; 1902–1983), mobster
- Ring Lardner (1885–1933), writer
- Albert Lasker (1880–1952), businessman
- Dan Le Batard, ESPN Radio & TV host
- Lil Wayne (born 1982), rapper
- Bernarr MacFadden, bodybuilder, owner of the Deauville Hotel
- Floyd Mayweather Jr. (born 1977), boxer
- William "Billy" Milligan, accused rapist found not guilty by reason of insanity
- Alex Omes, Argentine-born American music promoter
- Yaxeni Oriquen-Garcia, Venezuelan-American IFBB professional bodybuilder
- James Cash Penney, department store magnate
- Robert Pera (born 1978), founder of Ubiquiti and owner of the Memphis Grizzlies
- Gabe Plotkin (born 1979), hedge fund manager, founder of Melvin Capital
- Keith Rabois (born 1969), venture capitalist
- Irving Jacob Reuter, General Motors
- Grantland Rice, sportswriter
- Bernice Rose (1935–2023), art historian and curator
- Mark B. Rosenberg (born 1949), political scientist
- Rick Ross (born 1976), rapper
- Ed Rubinoff (born 1935), tennis player
- Paulina Rubio (born 1971), Mexican singer
- Damon Runyon, newspaperman and writer
- Nicholas Schenck (1880–1969), film industry
- Eric Schmidt (born 1955), former CEO of Google
- Dutch Schultz (born Arthur Simon Flegenheimer; 1901–1935), mobster
- Richard M. Schulze (born 1940), founder of Best Buy
- Robin Sherwood (born 1952), actress
- Anthony Shriver (born 1965), founder of Best Buddies International
- Barry Sternlicht (born 1960), founder of Starwood Capital Group
- Sid Tepper (1918–2015), songwriter
- Peter Thiel (born 1967), entrepreneur and venture capitalist, PayPal co-founder
- Gianni Versace (1946–1997), Italian fashion designer
- Betty Viana-Adkins, Venezuelan IFBB professional bodybuilder
- Neal Walk (1948–2015), basketball player
- Albert Warner (born Aaron Abraham Wonsal, 1884–1967), Warner Brothers studio founder
- Russell Weiner, founder of Rockstar Energy
- Steve Witkoff (born 1957), attorney, politician, advisor
- Garfield Wood (1880–1971), inventor
- Martin Zilber (born 1962), judge

== Sister cities ==
Miami Beach has 13 sister cities

- Almonte, Spain
- Marbella, Spain
- Fortaleza, Brazil
- Santa Marta, Colombia
- Český Krumlov, Czech Republic
- Nahariya, Israel
- Pescara, Italy
- Fujisawa, Japan
- Cozumel, Mexico
- Ica, Peru
- Basel, Switzerland
- Brampton, Canada
- Asmara, Eritrea

== See also ==
- List of mayors of Miami Beach, Florida
- List of tallest buildings in Miami Beach
- Miami Beach Police Department
- Rosie the Elephant

== Sources ==
- Carson, Ruby Leach (1955). "Forty Years of Miami Beach" (PDF). Tequesta. Historical Association of Southern Florida. ISSN 0363-3705. Archived from the original (PDF) on June 23, 2010 – via Florida International University.
- Hellmann, Paul T. (2006). "Florida: Miami Beach". Historical Gazetteer of the United States. Taylor & Francis. ISBN 1-135-94859-3.
