= Citi Bike Miami =

Bike sharing system in Miami Beach, Florida, US

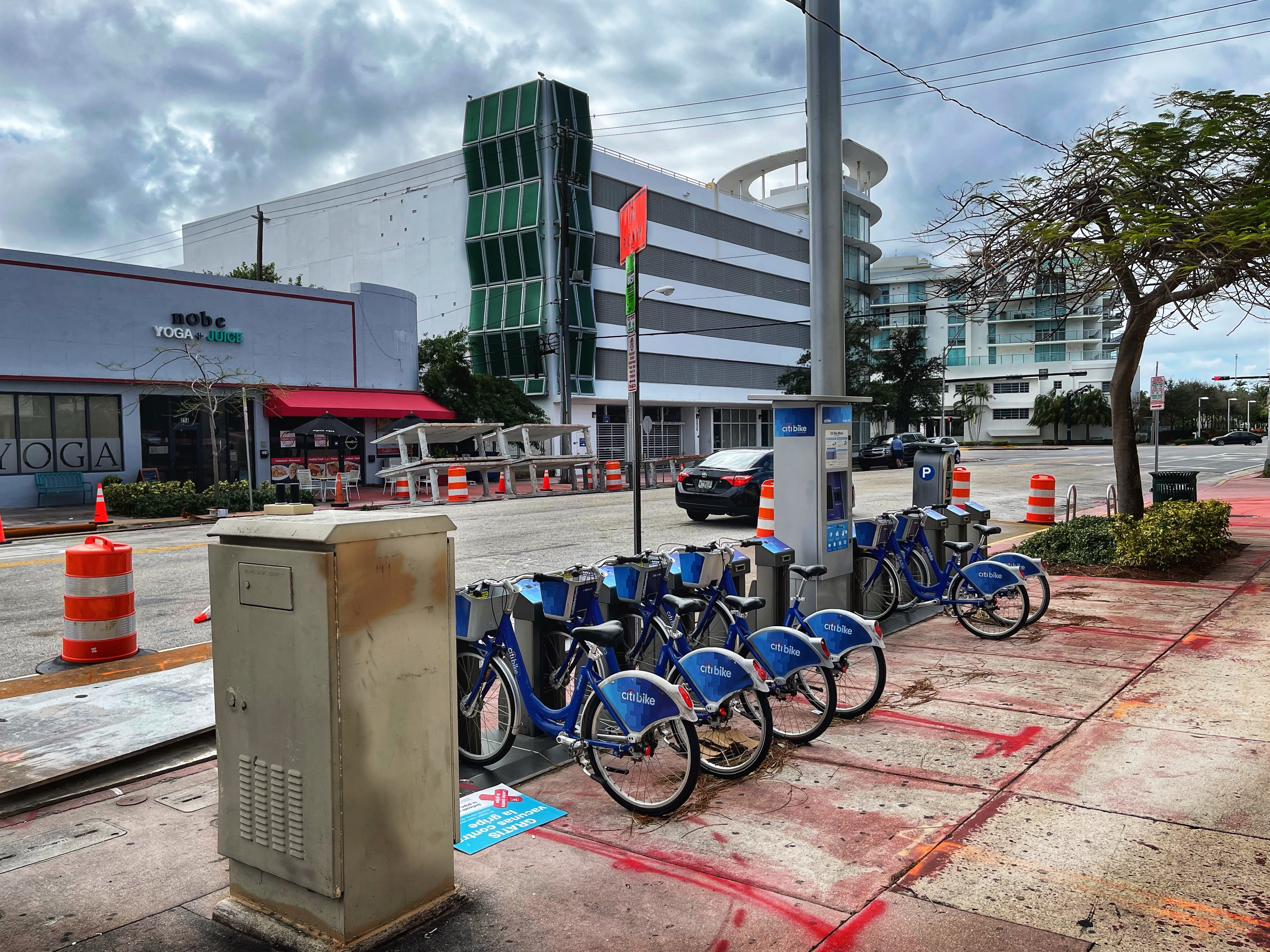

Overview
- Owner: DecoBike
- Locale: City of Miami Beach
- Transit type: Bicycle-sharing system
- Number of stations: 100
- Website: citibikemiami.com

Operation
- Began operation: March 15, 2011; 15 years ago
- Number of vehicles: 1000

Citi Bike Miami (also known as DecoBike) is a bicycle-sharing system deployed in Miami Beach, Florida.

== History ==
DecoBike was rolled out on March 15, 2011 with approximately 60 kiosks & 500 bikes throughout Miami Beach. By 2014, the program has exceeded 3 million rides and had around 100 kiosks with 1,000 bikes. In October 2014, the bike-share program changed its name to Citi Bike Miami, reflecting sponsorship from Citibank. Citi Bike Miami has plans to link the Miami Beach and Miami systems by the end of January 2015.

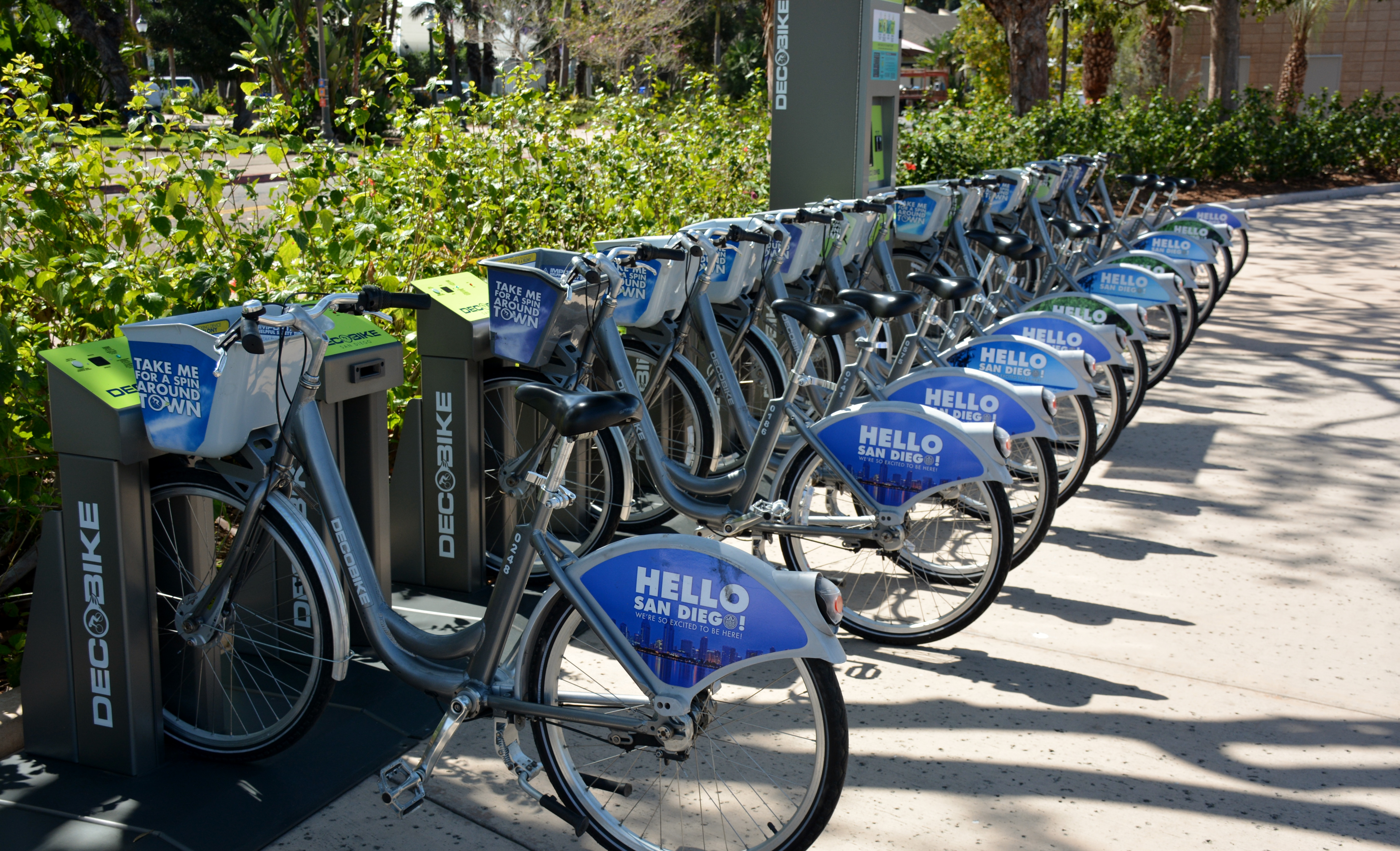
DecoBike bicycles at the docking station in San Diego, California, 2016

In August 2015, DecoBike program opened in San Diego with 200 stations and 1800 bikes. In September 2017, 15 DecoBike stations were removed from the boardwalk following Pacific Beach residents’ protests. In April 2019, city officials ordered the company to remove its stations, citing breach of contract.

== See also ==
- Bicycle rental
- Bicycle culture
- Free bicycle/Short term hire schemes
- Sustainable transport
- Carsharing
- Collaborative consumption
