= Martin Zilber =

American judge

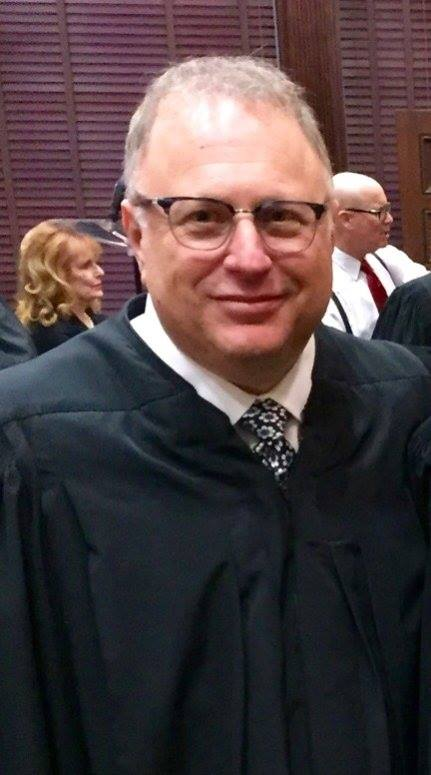
- Zilber in October 2015
- Born: 1962 (age 63–64); Miami Beach, Florida, U.S.
- Education: University of Florida; University of Miami School of Law
- Occupations: Mediator and former Florida Circuit Court Judge
- Years active: 1989 - Present
- Spouse: Cynthia Zilber
- Children: Michael Zilber, Leigh Zilber

Martin Zilber is an American retired judge based in Miami-Dade County, Florida. He was elected to the court in 2014 for a term beginning on January 6, 2015, and departed the bench in May 2021. After years of community service was also a candidate for the Miami City Commission in 2023.

== Early life and education ==
Zilber was born in Miami Beach, Florida in 1962. Martin received his B.A. from the University of Florida in 1984 and his J.D. from the University of Miami School of Law in 1988.

== Early life and education ==
Zilber graduated from the University of Florida and the University of Miami School of Law.

== Career ==
After graduating from the University of Miami School of Law, Zilber became a legal intern in the Miami-Dade county state attorney's office. In 1989, Zilber went to work as in-house general counsel to several transportation companies including Metro Transportation Services, Metro Taxi and Greyline Bus.

In 1997, he became vice president of mergers and acquisitions for Coach USA. After the acquisition of the company by Stagecoach, he became the president of the Taxi Cab, Limousine, and Paratransit Association. In 2001, he co-founded the firm, Stolzenberg, Gelles, and Zilber, and remained there as a partner, till 2014. From 2010 to 2014, Zilber also served as a traffic magistrate in Miami-Dade county.

In 2005 he was elected, to a four-year term, to the Coconut Grove village council. The council was responsible for voting on a variety of zoning and community issues. During his term, Zilber was elected chairman of the village council by fellow councilmen. The same year, he was appointed to the Jackson Memorial Hospital Public Health Trust. Zilber was recommended by Florida governor Jeb Bush and appointed by the Miami-Dade county commission. He served for ten years on the Miami-Dade county arts board and was active in the cultural and arts as vice chairman of the cultural affairs council of Miami Dade county. He was an adjunct professor at Miami-Dade College and Florida International University. Judge Zilber also serves as a board member for the University of Miami School of Law.

He was a judge for the Eleventh Circuit Court, in Florida, before resigning following an investigation into allegations of judicial misconduct. He was elected to the court, in 2014, for a term beginning on January 6, 2015, and expiring on January 4, 2027. He began in the Juvenile Dependency Division and Unified Family Court, and then the Felony Criminal Division of the Circuit Court. At the time he resigned, Zilber served in the Circuit Civil Division.

Zilber in 2023 ran for the Miami City Commission. Zilber lost to Sabrina Covo, obtaining only 12% of the vote.

== Investigation in Misconduct ==
On April 9, 2021, the Investigative Panel of the Florida Judicial Qualifications Commission found that Martin Zilber had engaged in judicial misconduct. He was accused of improperly requesting his staff to do his personal tasks. The Commission also found he was often tardy, worked from home and was absent from the courthouse. Consequently, the Commission recommended that he be fined $30,000, suspended for 60 days, re-attend Florida Judicial College, and write letters of apology to his staff and former staff.[11][12] The judge submitted a resignation letter on May 14, 2021.

Following Zilber’s departure from the bench, The Florida Bar separately investigated the allegations surrounding the matter. After conducting its review, The Florida Bar found no probable cause to impose disciplinary sanctions against him. As a result, the Miami Herald reported that no disciplinary action was taken against Zilber in connection with the allegations.

As of September 10, 2026, Zilber serves as the current Chair of The Florida Bar’s Eleventh Judicial Circuit Grievance Committee, a committee responsible for reviewing complaints involving attorneys and evaluating matters related to professional conduct and potential disciplinary proceedings.

== Personal life ==
Zilber lives with his wife and two children in Miami-Dade County, Florida. His son Michael is also an attorney at the Carlton Fields law firm.
