= 2015 Miami Beach mayoral election =

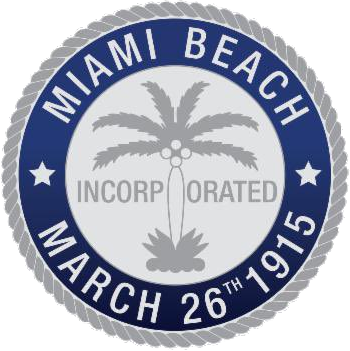
- November 3, 2015
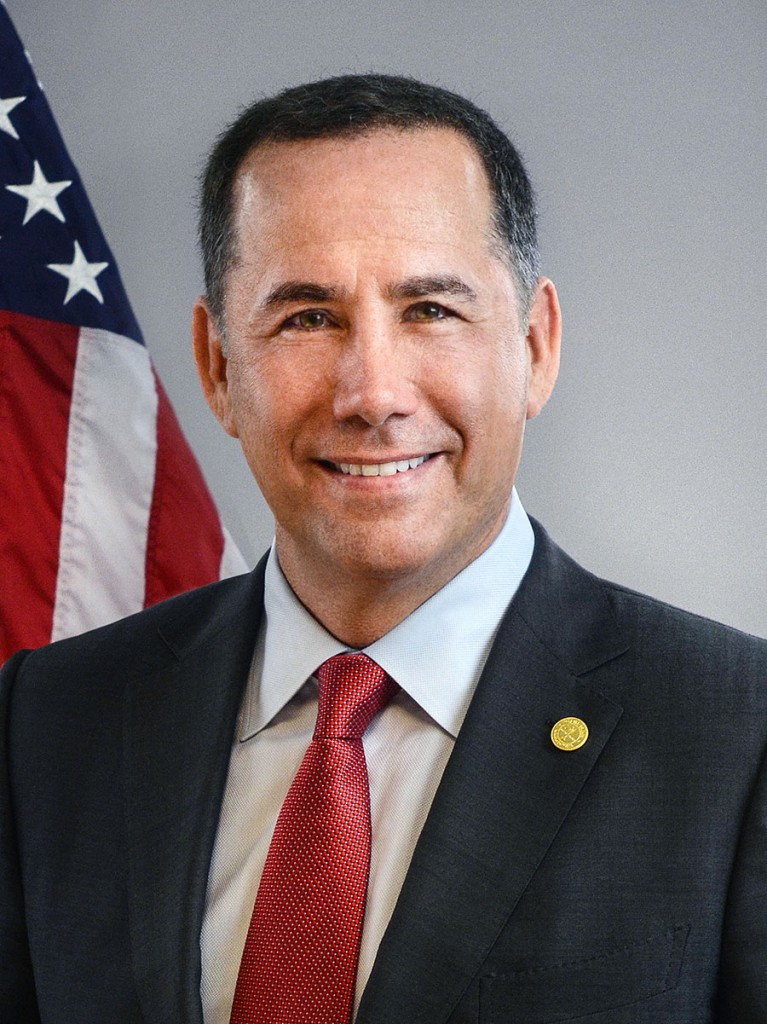

Nominee	Philip Levine	David S. Wieder
Party	Democratic	Democratic
Popular vote	6,842	3,609
Percentage	65.47%	34.53%
Mayor before election
Philip Levine
Democratic
Elected mayor
Philip Levine
Democratic

The 2015 Miami Beach mayoral election took place on November 3, 2015, to elect the mayor of Miami Beach, Florida. The election was held concurrently with various other local elections, and was officially nonpartisan. Mayor Philip Levine secured reelection with over 50% of the vote, avoiding a runoff.

== See also ==
- Mayors of Miami Beach
