= Sybil Spencer =

UK gardener (1908–1994)

- Born: Sybil Armitage; 29 March 1908; Leeds
- Died: 1994 (aged 85–86)
- Education: RADA
- Occupation: gardener
- Known for: co-creating and gifting the York Gate garden
- Spouse: Frederick Spencer
- Children: Robin Spencer

Sybil Beatrice Spencer born Sybil Beatrice Armitage (29 March 1908 – 1994) was a British gardener. With her husband and son she created the York Gate Garden. After the deaths of her son and her husband she cared for the garden for twelve years leaving it to a charity to be shared by visitors.

== Life ==
Spencer was born in Leeds; her parents were Mary Jane (born Ellis) and Nathaniel Newburn Armitage, a pharmacist. Spencer trained at RADA.

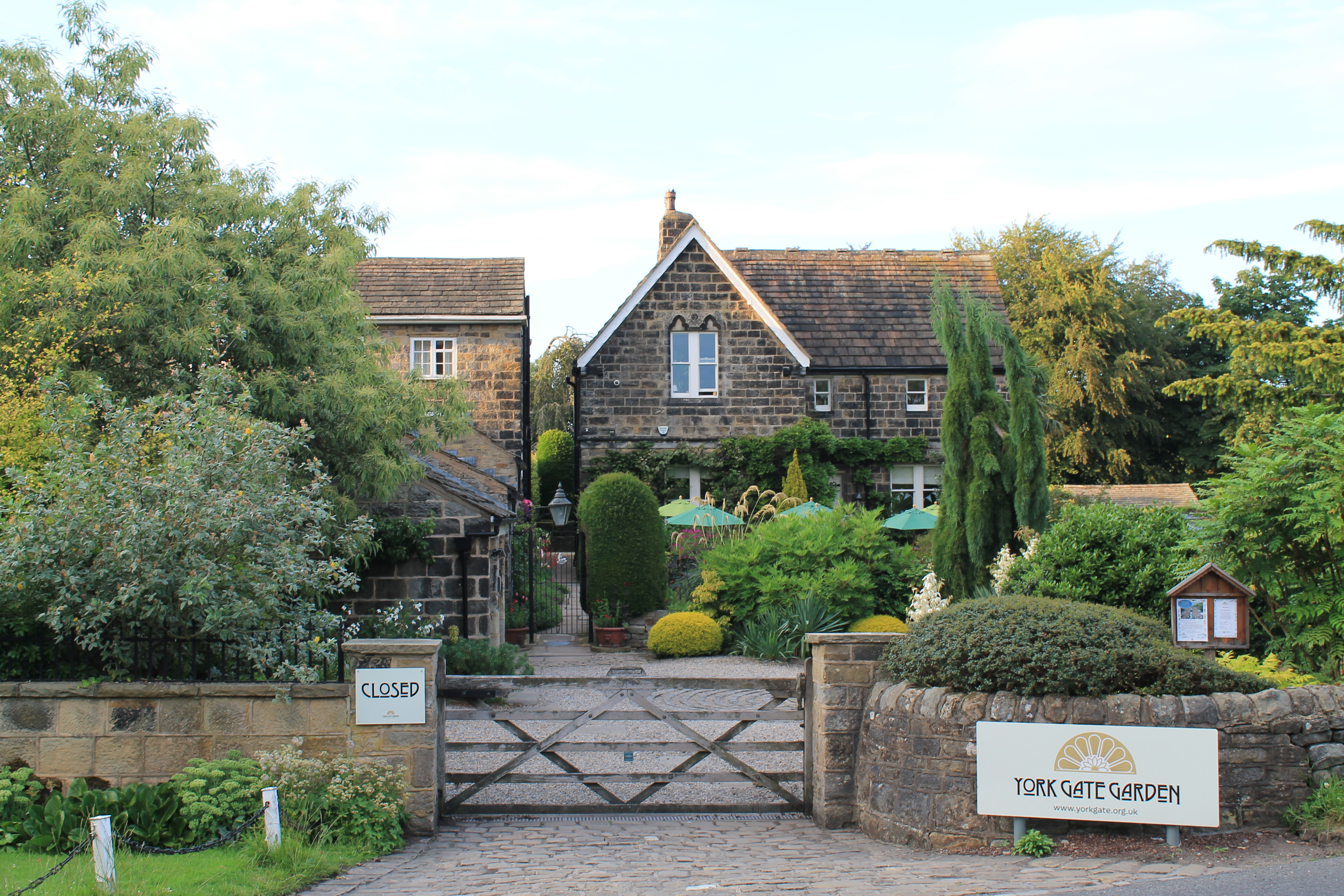
York Gate Garden was given by Sybil Spencer - 2019 photo

In 1951 the York Gate house at Adel near Leeds was purchased. At the time it was surrounded by fields. A garden was built consisting of different "rooms" in the Arts and Crafts style. The success of the garden was in its design and Spencer's skill as a gardener. The garden surrounds three sides of the house and her husband Frederick, who was a surveyor, designed the garden's rooms to be accessible from the main path. There are over a dozen of these rooms.

After the death of her son, Robin, when he was 47, she took over the management of the garden. Like her, Robin was a skilled plantsperson, but he had also collected an old water pump, griffin statues and cruck beams for the garden which were recycled from a local chapel.

== Death and legacy ==
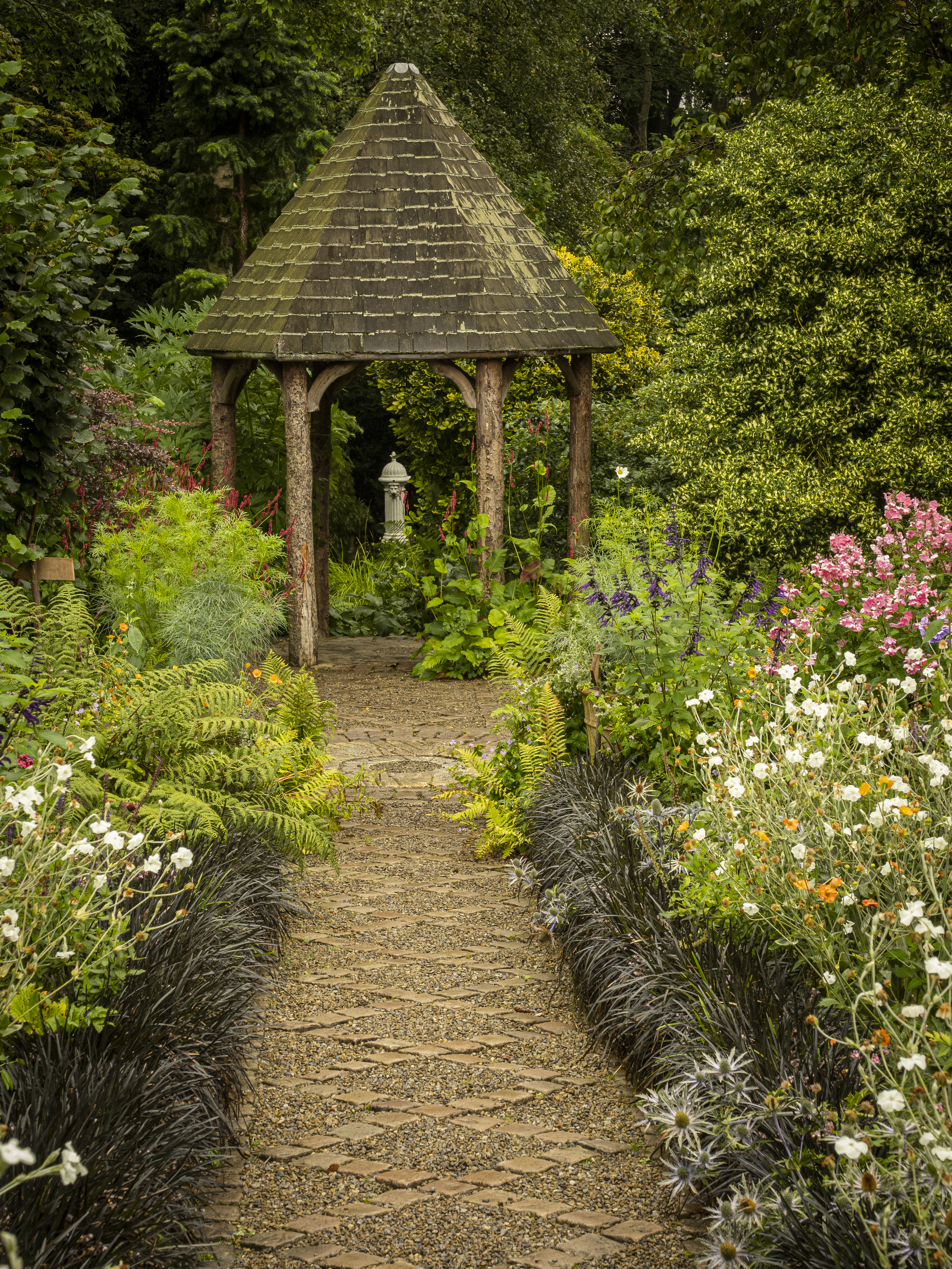
Vista at York Gate Garden in 2020

When she died in 1994 she left the garden to the Gardeners' Royal Benevolent Society in order that it should be shared with others. The small garden that her family built is said to be one of England's best. The garden continues to be developed and it has gained a Mediterranean garden created by Alistair Baldwin and the head gardener.

In 2021 the garden had eight full time staff and 100 volunteers maintaining the garden.
