= Gardeners' Royal Benevolent Society =

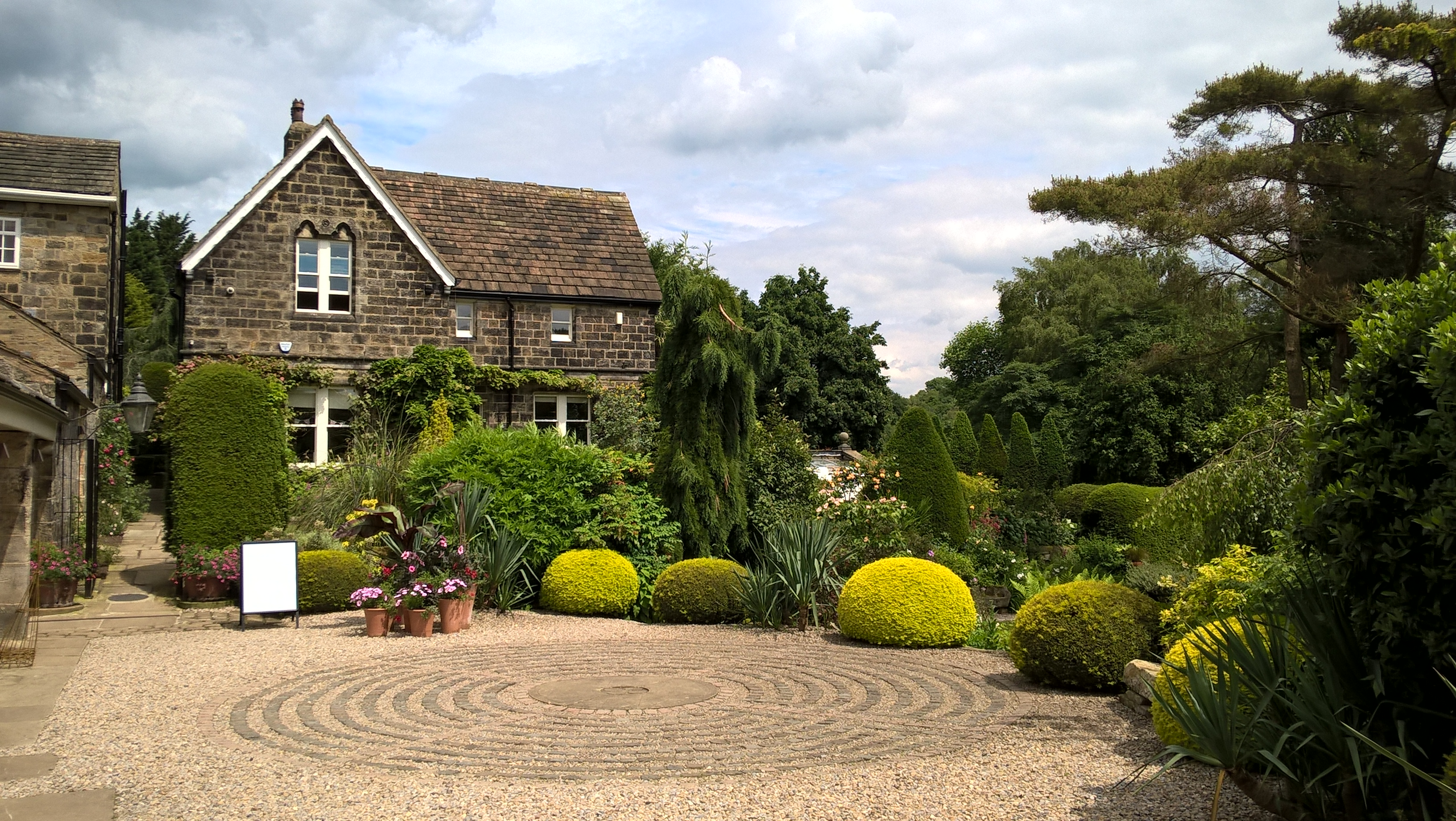
Entrance to the society's York Gate Garden

Gardeners' Royal Benevolent Society is a large national charity in the United Kingdom. It currently operates under the working name Perennial.

Founded in 1839, Gardeners' Royal Benevolent Society is based in Leatherhead, Surrey, and is a registered charity under English and Scottish law.

Its activities include support for people in the horticultural trade, education in horticulture and preservation of gardens.

== Gardens ==
Perennial maintains two gardens open to the public. York Gate Garden is at Adel near Leeds. The garden was given to the society by Sybil Spencer in 1994. The other garden is Fullers Mill Garden which is at West Stow, near Bury St Edmunds in Suffolk.

In 2015 Sir Roy Strong announced that he would bequeath The Laskett Gardens in Herefordshire to the Society.

== See also ==
- Royal Horticultural Society
