= Julia Trevelyan Oman =

Set designer

Julia Trevelyan Oman CBE
- Born: 11 July 1930; Kensington, London, England
- Died: 10 October 2003 (aged 73); Much Birch, Herefordshire, England
- Occupations: Set designer in television, theatre, ballet & opera
- Title: Lady Strong
- Spouse: Sir Roy Strong (m. 1971)

Julia Trevelyan Oman, Lady Strong CBE (11 July 1930 – 10 October 2003) was an English television, theatre, ballet and opera set designer.

== Biography ==
Julia Trevelyan Oman was born on 11 July 1930 in Kensington, London. Her father was Charles Chichele Oman, Keeper of Metalwork at the Victoria and Albert Museum, son of Sir Charles Oman; her mother the historian Joan Trevelyan, daughter of Calcutta High Court judge Sir Ernest John Trevelyan. She was educated at Wimbledon College of Art and then at the Royal College of Art, where she won a silver medal in 1955.

Among the BBC television programmes Oman worked on were Dixon of Dock Green and the Billy Cotton Band Show. In 1966, she won the designer of the year award for her contribution to Jonathan Miller's television production of Alice in Wonderland. In 1968 she won the Plays and Players “Best Set” award for Brief Lives, directed by Patrick Garland, with whom she worked on several occasions. She later designed sets for the Chichester Festival, Hamburg State Opera, the Glyndebourne Festival, the National Theatre, the Royal Opera House, and the Royal Shakespeare Company.

Oman's design work is classed as a highly detailed naturalism, often researching her location and time period extensively. She was concerned primarily with the creation of an entire visual effect, often designing both the set and costumes to have full control over the transportive nature of the aesthetics of the production she worked on. Her designs are endearing, with many of her ballet designs still performed on stage, including the Royal Ballet's The Nutcracker which still uses her original set and costumes from 1984.

Oman married the art historian Roy Strong on 10 September 1971, at Wilmcote church, near Stratford-upon-Avon, with a special licence from the Archbishop of Canterbury. She was 41 and her husband 36. They lived at Much Birch, Herefordshire, where they made one of Britain's largest post-war formal gardens, The Laskett. In 1995 they commissioned the artist Jonathan Myles-Lea to paint a 'portrait' of the house and gardens and the painting The Laskett was completed the same year. She and Strong also wrote books together.

Oman appeared as a castaway on the BBC Radio programme Desert Island Discs on 18 December 1971, and was made a Commander of the Order of the British Empire (CBE) in the 1986 New Year Honours.

== Death and legacy ==
She died at Much Birch, on 10 October 2003, of pancreatic cancer.

A number of her paintings, including a self-portrait, are in the University of Bristol's Theatre Collection.
