= Brief Lives =

Late 17th-century collection of biographies by John Aubrey

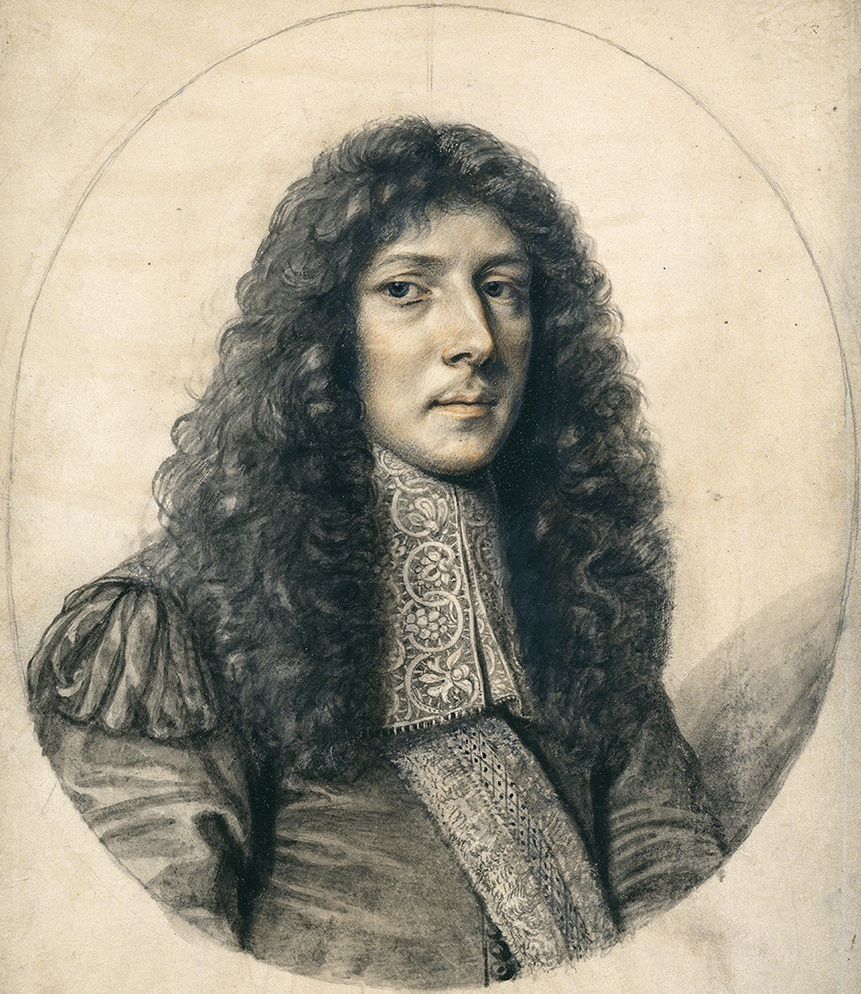
John Aubrey, author of Brief Lives

Brief Lives is a collection of short biographies written by John Aubrey (1626–1697) in the last decades of the 17th century.

== Writing ==
Aubrey initially began collecting biographical material to assist the Oxford scholar Anthony Wood, who was working on his own collection of biographies. With time, Aubrey's biographical researches went beyond mere assistance to Wood and became a project in its own right.

Aubrey was careful, wherever possible, to seek out and talk with those who had been acquainted with his subjects. His sociable nature and his wide circle of friends helped him in this pursuit. At his death, Aubrey left his biographical writings in a state of chaos. It has been the task of later editors to organise the manuscripts (held at the Bodleian Library) into readable form.

== Afterlife ==
The Brief Lives includes biographies of such figures as Francis Bacon, Robert Boyle, Thomas Browne, John Dee, Sir Walter Raleigh, Edmund Halley, Ben Jonson, Thomas Hobbes, John Ogilby, William Petty and William Shakespeare. There have been many modern editions.

Patrick Garland wrote and directed a play Brief Lives based on Aubrey's work; featuring Roy Dotrice as Aubrey. The production has been performed worldwide since 1969. It was originally designed by Julia Trevelyan Oman and incorporated more than 2,500 props, vividly recreating the life and personality of Aubrey. The play was first written and produced as part of Garland’s six-part series Famous Gossips, and was later adapted into the stage version by Garland, Oman, and Dotrice.

In 2008, Aubrey's Brief Lives was a five-part drama serial on BBC Radio 4. Writer Nick Warburton intertwined some of Aubrey's biographical sketches with the story of the turbulent friendship between Aubrey and Wood. Abigail le Fleming produced and directed.

== Sources ==
- Levy, F. J. (1984). "John Aubrey. Brief Lives by Richard Barber". Albion. 16 (1). The North American Conference on British Studies: 47–49. doi:10.2307/4048911. ISSN 0095-1390. JSTOR 4048911.
- Reynolds, Gillian (2 December 2008). "Gillian Reynolds: the week in radio". The Telegraph. ISSN 0307-1235.
- Walker, Tim (30 January 2008). "Two old stagers find vigour in Brief Lives". The Spectator.
