= Roy Strong =

British art historian

Sir Roy Strong CH, FRSL, FSA
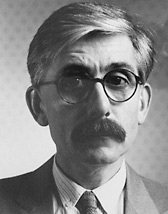
- Born: Roy Colin Strong; 23 August 1935 (age 91); Winchmore Hill, Middlesex, England
- Education: Queen Mary College, University of London (BA); Warburg Institute (PhD)
- Occupation: Art historian
- Spouse: Julia Trevelyan Oman (m. 1971; died 2003)

Sir Roy Colin Strong, CH, FRSL, FSA (born 23 August 1935) is an English art historian, museum curator, writer, broadcaster and landscape designer. He has served as director of both the National Portrait Gallery and the Victoria and Albert Museum in London. Strong was knighted in 1982, and made a Member of the Order of the Companions of Honour in 2016.

== Early years ==
Roy Colin Strong was born at Winchmore Hill (at that time in Middlesex; it later became part of the London Borough of Enfield), the third son of hat manufacturer's commercial traveller George Edward Clement Strong, and Mabel Ada Strong (née Smart). He was raised in "an Enfield terrace sans books, with linoleum 'in shades of unutterable green'", and attended nearby Edmonton County School, a grammar school in Edmonton.

Strong graduated with a first-class honours degree in history from Queen Mary College, University of London. He then earned his PhD degree from the Warburg Institute and became a research fellow at the Institute of Historical Research. He put aside his passionate interest in the portraiture of Queen Elizabeth I in order to write a thesis on Elizabethan Court Pageantry, supervised by Renaissance scholar Dame Frances Yates, "'who [he says] restructured and re-formed my thinking'". In 2007, Strong listed his qualifications as DLitt PhD FSA.

== Career ==
=== National Portrait Gallery ===
He became assistant keeper of the National Portrait Gallery in London in 1959. In 1967, aged 32, he was appointed its director, a post he held until 1973. He set about transforming its conservative image with a series of extrovert shows, including "600 Cecil Beaton portraits 1928–1968". Dedicated to the culture of the 1960s and 1970s, Strong went on to amuse audiences at the V&A in 1974 with his collection of fedora hats, kipper ties and maxi coats. By regularly introducing new exhibitions, he doubled attendance.

Reflecting on his time as director of the National Portrait Gallery, Strong pinpointed the Beaton exhibition as a turning point in the gallery's history. "The public flocked to the exhibition and its run was extended twice. The queues to get in made national news. The Gallery had arrived," Strong wrote in the catalogue to Beaton Portraits, the more recent exhibition of Beaton that ran at the gallery until 31 May 2004.

=== Victoria and Albert Museum ===
In 1974, aged 38, he became the youngest director of the Victoria and Albert Museum (V&A), London, following John Pope-Hennessy who moved to the British Museum. Strong proved something of a polarising figure; he was condemned by Hennessy in his 1991 autobiography for "a thirteen years reign that reduced the museum and its staff to a level from which it will not recover for many years". During his tenure, until 1987, he presided over its exhibitions The Destruction of the Country House (1974, with Marcus Binney and John Harris), Change and Decay: the future of our churches (1977), and The Garden: a Celebration of a Thousand Years of British Gardening (1979), all of which have been credited with boosting their conservationist agendas. In 1977, following government cuts, he oversaw the closure of the much-lamented Circulation Department of the V&A, which organised tours of the collection around Britain. In 1980, "he was awarded the prestigious Shakespeare Prize by the FVS Foundation of Hamburg in recognition of his contribution to the arts in the UK". In 2003, he was awarded the Royal Photographic Society's President's Medal and Honorary Fellowship (HonFRPS) in recognition of a sustained, significant contribution to the art of photography.

=== Television ===
Among other work for television, in 2008, Strong hosted a six-part TV reality series, The Diets That Time Forgot. He acted as the Director of the fictitious Institute of Physical Culture, where nine volunteers spent 24 days testing three weight-loss diets and fitness regimes that were popular in the late Victorian era (William Banting and his no-sugar diet), the Edwardian era (Horace Fletcher and his chewing diet), and the "roaring" Twenties (Dr Lulu Hunt Peters and her calorie-counting diet). The weekly series was first aired on 18 March on Channel 4.

=== Writing ===
Strong is a notable scholar of Renaissance art, especially English Elizabethan portraiture, on which he has written many books and articles (see bibliography section). His Diaries from 1967 to 1987 were published in 1997, and The Spirit of Britain: A Narrative History of the Arts, a widely acclaimed 700-page popular history of the arts in Britain through two millennia in 1999. In 2005, he published Coronation: A History of Kingship and the British Monarchy. He had a monthly column in the Financial Times for much of the 1970s and 1980s, and has written articles for many other magazines and newspapers. In 2000, he wrote Gardens Through the Ages and is a patron of the Plantation Garden, Norwich.

== Personal life ==
=== Marriage ===
On 10 September 1971, Strong married 41-year-old theatrical designer Julia Trevelyan Oman at Wilmcote church, near Stratford-upon-Avon, with a special licence from the Archbishop of Canterbury. They enjoyed a belated honeymoon in Tuscany. She died in 2003 of pancreatic cancer.

=== Herefordshire ===
Strong lives in the village of Much Birch in Herefordshire. Here, with his wife, he designed one of Britain's largest post-war formal gardens, the Laskett Gardens. In 1995, he and his wife commissioned the artist Jonathan Myles-Lea to paint a portrait of the house and gardens, which was completed the same year. Since 2010, the gardens have been open to the public by appointment, for groups of more than twenty. An offer by Strong to bequeath Laskett Gardens to the National Trust was rejected in 2014 after it was deemed that they fail to "reach the high rung of national and historic importance". Strong later announced plans to have the gardens "destroyed" after his death. He subsequently relented and in 2015 agreed to bequeath the gardens to the horticultural charity "Perennial" (Gardeners' Royal Benevolent Society).

After leaving the V&A, Strong published a set of diaries that became notorious for its critical assessments of figures in the art and political worlds. It has been rumoured that he has retained a set for posthumous publication. Jan Moir commented in 2002: "His bitchy, hilarious diaries caused a storm when they were published in 1997 and although he has no plans at present to publish another set, he is keeping a private diary again."

=== Gardening ===
Strong subsequently designed gardens for Gianni Versace at Versace's Lake Como villa, Villa Fontanelle, and Versace's Miami house, Casa Casuarina. At Versace's behest, Strong designed an Italian garden at Elton John's residence, Woodside, in Old Windsor, Berkshire.

=== Anglicanism ===
A practising Anglican, Strong is an altar server at Hereford Cathedral, and served as High Bailiff and Searcher of the Sanctuary of Westminster Abbey. In this capacity, he attended the funeral service of the Queen Mother in 2002. On 30 May 2007, in the crypt of St Paul's Cathedral, he delivered the annual Gresham College Special Lecture, titled "The Beauty of Holiness and its Perils (or what is to happen to 10,000 parish churches?)", which was deeply critical of the status quo. He said: "little case can be made in the twenty-first century for an expensive building to exist for a service once a week or month lasting an hour," and he wanted to "take an axe and hatchet the utterly awful kipper coloured choir stalls and pews, drag them out of the church and burn them," and "letting in the local community" in order to preserve many rural churches in Britain.

== Portraits of Roy Strong ==
The National Portrait Gallery Collection has seventeen portraits of Strong, including a photo and a sketch by Cecil Beaton and an oil painting by Bryan Organ. An early bronze bust by Angela Conner is on view at Chatsworth House, Derbyshire. In 2005, Strong sat for Jon Edgar for a work in terracotta, which was exhibited at Yorkshire Sculpture Park in 2013 as part of the Sculpture Series Heads – Contributors to British Sculpture. A bronze of this head is in the permanent collection of the Bodleian Library, Oxford, where Strong's papers reside.

== Honours ==
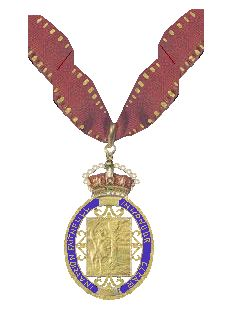
Insignia of CH

In 1980, the Hamburg-based Alfred Toepfer Foundation awarded Strong its annual Shakespeare Prize in recognition of his life's work. Strong was knighted in the 1982 New Year Honours and was appointed Member of the Order of the Companions of Honour (CH) in the 2016 New Year Honours for services to culture. He was elected a Fellow of the Royal Society of Literature in 1999.

== Honorary positions ==
- Chairman of the Art Department, Arts Council
- Deputy Chairman, Southbank Centre
- High Bailiff and Searcher of the Sanctuary of Westminster Abbey, 2000–2021
- President, Garden History Society, 2000–2006
- President, Friends of Croome Park, from 2008
- Vice-President Plant Heritage
- Patron Broadway Arts Festival, 2015

== Bibliography ==
=== Books ===
- Portraits of Queen Elizabeth I (Clarendon Press, London, 1963)
- Leicester's Triumph (Leiden: Leiden University Press, and Oxford: Oxford University Press, 1965), with J. A. van Dorsten.
- A Brief Guide to the National Portrait Gallery (London: Pitkin Pictorials, 1969)
- The English Icon: Elizabethan & Jacobean Portraiture (London: Paul Mellon Centre for Studies in British Art, 1969)
- Tudor & Jacobean Portraits in the National Portrait Gallery (Her Majesty's Stationery Office, London, 1969)
- Nicholas Hilliard (Michael Joseph Ltd, London, 1975) ISBN 0-7181-1301-2
- The Cult of Elizabeth: Elizabethan Portraiture and Pageantry (Thames & Hudson, 1977) ISBN 978-0-500-23263-7
- And When Did You Last See Your Father?: The Victorian Painter and British History (London: Thames and Hudson, 1978) ISBN 978-0-500-23281-1
- The Renaissance Garden in England (London: Thames and Hudson, 1979) ISBN 978-0-500-01209-3
- The English Year: A Personal Selection from Chambers' Book of Days (with Julia Trevelyan Oman) (Ticknor & Fields, New Haven, 1982) ISBN 978-0-899-19122-5
- Artists of the Tudor Court: The Portrait Miniature Rediscovered 1520–1620 (V&A Publishing, London, 1983)
- Art and Power: Renaissance Festivals 1450–1650 (Boydell Press, 1984) ISBN 978-0-851-15200-4
- Strong Points (Thames & Hudson, 1985) ISBN 978-0-500-01377-9
- Creating Small Gardens (Conran Octopus, London, 1986) ISBN 1-85029-067-9
- Henry Prince of Wales & England's Lost Renaissance (Thames & Hudson, London, 1986)
- Gloriana: The Portraits of Queen Elizabeth I (Thames & Hudson, London, 1987) ISBN 978-0-500-25098-3
- A Small Garden Designer's Handbook (Conran Octopus, London, 1987) ISBN 1-85029-110-1
- Lost Treasures of Britain: Five Centuries of Creation and Destruction (Viking Press, London, 1990) ISBN 978-0-670-83383-2
- The Tudor and Stuart Monarchy: Pageantry, Painting, Iconography, Vol. 1 (The Boydell Press, 1990)
- The Garden Trellis (London: Pavilion; New York: Simon & Schuster, 1991) ISBN 978-1-851-45795-3 ISBN 978-0-671-74404-5
- Small Period Gardens: A Practical Guide to Design and Planting (historic plant lists compiled by Tony Lord) (London: Conran Octopus; New York: Rizzoli, 1992) ISBN 978-1-850-29365-1 ISBN 978-0-847-81551-7
- A Country Life: At Home in the English Countryside (illustrated by Julia Trevelyan Oman) (St Martin's Press, 1994)
- Successful Small Gardens: New Designs for Time-conscious Gardeners (London: Conran Octopus, 1994; New York: Rizzoli, 1995) ISBN 978-1-850-29612-6 ISBN 978-0-847-81839-6
- William Larkin: Icons of Splendour (Franco Maria Ricci, 1995)
- Country Life, 1897–1997: The English Arcadia (1996) ISBN 0-7522-1054-8
- The Tudor and Stuart Monarchy: Pageantry, Painting, Iconography, Vol. 2: Elizabethan (The Boydell Press, 1996)
- The Roy Strong Diaries 1967–1987 (Weidenfeld & Nicolson, 1997) ISBN 978-0-297-81841-0
- The Tudor and Stuart Monarchy: Pageantry, Painting, Iconography, Vol. 3: Jacobean and Caroline (The Boydell Press, 1997)
- The Story of Britain: A People's History (Weidenfeld & Nicolson, 1998) ISBN 978-1-474-60705-6
- The Spirit of Britain: A Narrative History of the Arts (Jonathan Cape, 1999) ISBN 978-1-856-81534-5
- The Artist & the Garden (Yale University Press (Paul Mellon Centre for Studies in British Art), 2000) ISBN 978-0-300-08520-4
- Gardens Through the Ages (Conran Octopus, 2000) ISBN 978-1-840-91151-0
- Feast: A History of Grand Eating (Jonathan Cape, 2002) ISBN 978-0-224-06138-4
- The Laskett: The Story of a Garden (Transworld, 2004) ISBN 978-0-553-81519-1
- Beaton Portraits (with Terence Pepper and Peter Conrad) (Yale University Press, 2004) ISBN 978-0-3001-0289-5
- Coronation: A History of Kingship and the British Monarchy (HarperCollins, 2005) ISBN 978-0-007-16054-9
- Passions Past and Present (Pimlico, 2005) ISBN 978-1-844-13927-9
- A Little History of the English Country Church (Random House, 2007) ISBN 978-0-224-07522-0
- Visions of England (The Bodley Head, 2011) ISBN 978-1-847-92160-4
- Roy Strong: Self-portrait as a Young Man (Bodleian Library, 2013) ISBN 978-185124-282-5
- Remaking a Garden: The Laskett Transformed (Frances Lincoln Publishers, 2014) ISBN 978-0-711-23396-6
- Scenes and Apparitions: The Roy Strong Diaries 1988–2003 (Weidenfeld & Nicolson, 2016) ISBN 978-1-474-60389-8
- Types and Shadows: The Roy Strong Diaries 2004–2015 (Weidenfeld & Nicolson, 2020) ISBN 978-1-474-61733-8
- The Stuart Image: English Portraiture 1603-1649 (The Boydell Press, 2023) ISBN 978-1-783-27720-9

=== Journal articles ===
- Strong, Roy C. (1959). "Queen Elizabeth I as Oriana". Studies in the Renaissance. 6: 251–260. doi:10.2307/2857192. JSTOR 2857192.
- Strong, Roy C. (1965). "Sir Henry Unton and His Portrait: An Elizabethan Memorial Picture and Its History". Archaeologia. 99: 53–76. doi:10.1017/S0261340900011139.
- Strong, Roy (7 July 1966). "Queen Christina and Her Pictures". Country Life. 140 (3618): 6–8.
- Strong, Roy; John Harris; Marcus Binney (10 September 2014). "Fighting the Good Fight". Country Life. 208 (37): 118–124.
- Strong, Roy (2019). "High Bailiff Retires". Westminster Abbey Review. 6: 40–42.

== Archives ==
A number of institutions hold the papers of Roy Strong. These include the National Portrait Gallery, the Bodleian Libraries and the Paul Mellon Centre UK. The National Portrait Gallery holds Strong's correspondence with colleagues and acquaintances, mostly of a semi-personal nature concerning his personal commitments and achievements. The Bodleian Libraries' holdings of Roy Strong papers include manuscripts of his many books on historical, cultural and artistic subjects; personal diaries, correspondence and material relating to the Laskett garden. The Paul Mellon Centre holds the research material compiled by Strong in the process of writing his publications on Tudor and Stuart art.
