= Peter Loftin =

American businessman

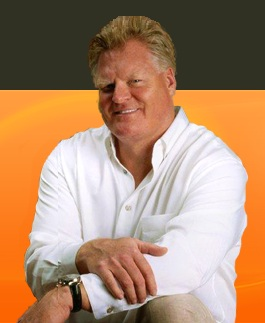
- Born: March 1, 1958; Denton, North Carolina
- Died: November 16, 2019 (aged 61); Miami, Florida
- Occupation: Entrepreneur
- Website: www.peterloftin.com

Peter Terrell Loftin (March 1, 1958 – November 16, 2019) was an American telecom entrepreneur who founded Business Telecom, Inc. (BTI) when he was only 25 years old and built it up to a multimillion-dollar company that was eventually merged with Deltacom (now EarthLink).

Loftin, age 61, died at his home in North Miami Beach, Florida on November 16, 2019.

== Career ==
In 1983 Loftin founded Raleigh, North Carolina–based Business Telecom, Inc. (BTI). In 1999, independent research group New Paradigm Resources ranked BTI seventh nationally among competitive local exchange carriers and BTI was considered one of the nation's top fifteen telecommunications companies, with over 60,000 customers and 600 employees.

Loftin served as chairman of the Board of BTI whose board members included Paul J. Rizzo, former vice-chairman of IBM, and the former Dean of the University of North Carolina's Kenan-Flagler Business School.

In 1997 BTI agreed to donate $3.1 million to Raleigh's Performing Arts Center, with Raleigh Mayor Tom Fetzer stated that this was the largest private donation made to the city of Raleigh arts program at the time and that "Pete Loftin was the only one that showed interest" in helping fund the project. The city council voted to name the center after BTI, naming it the BTI Center for the Performing Arts. In 2005, it was renamed Progress Energy Center for the Performing Arts after Progress Energy agreed to donate $7.5 million over the course of 20 years.

Business North Carolina Magazine named Loftin “North Carolina Entrepreneur of the Year”. In addition, NCEITA, the North Carolina Electronics and Information Technologies Association, awarded him and BTI the “Corporate Citizen of the Year Award” for providing free Internet services to the disabled in rural schools throughout North Carolina. He was then recognized for his contribution by the then Governor of North Carolina, James B. Hunt.

After selling a portion of BTI, Loftin's involvement in the arts encouraged his purchase of Casa Casuarina in 2000. Since owning Casa Casuarina he has restored it and turned it into a high-end boutique hotel and club as well as a luxurious residential property. Casa Casuarina is the former Miami Beach Mansion of Gianni Versace, who lived in the home from 1993 until his death in 1997. The home was built in 1930. Loftin sold the home in 2013.

In 2016, Loftin founded the largest new whiskey distillery in the United States. Bardstown Bourbon is the first-of-its-kind Collaborative Whiskey, Bourbon, and Rye Distilling Program located in Bardstown, Kentucky. Constellation Brands acquired a minority stake in the company in 2016.
