= Villa Fontanelle =

Villa in Moltrasio, Italy

Coordinates: 45°51′4″N 9°5′22″E

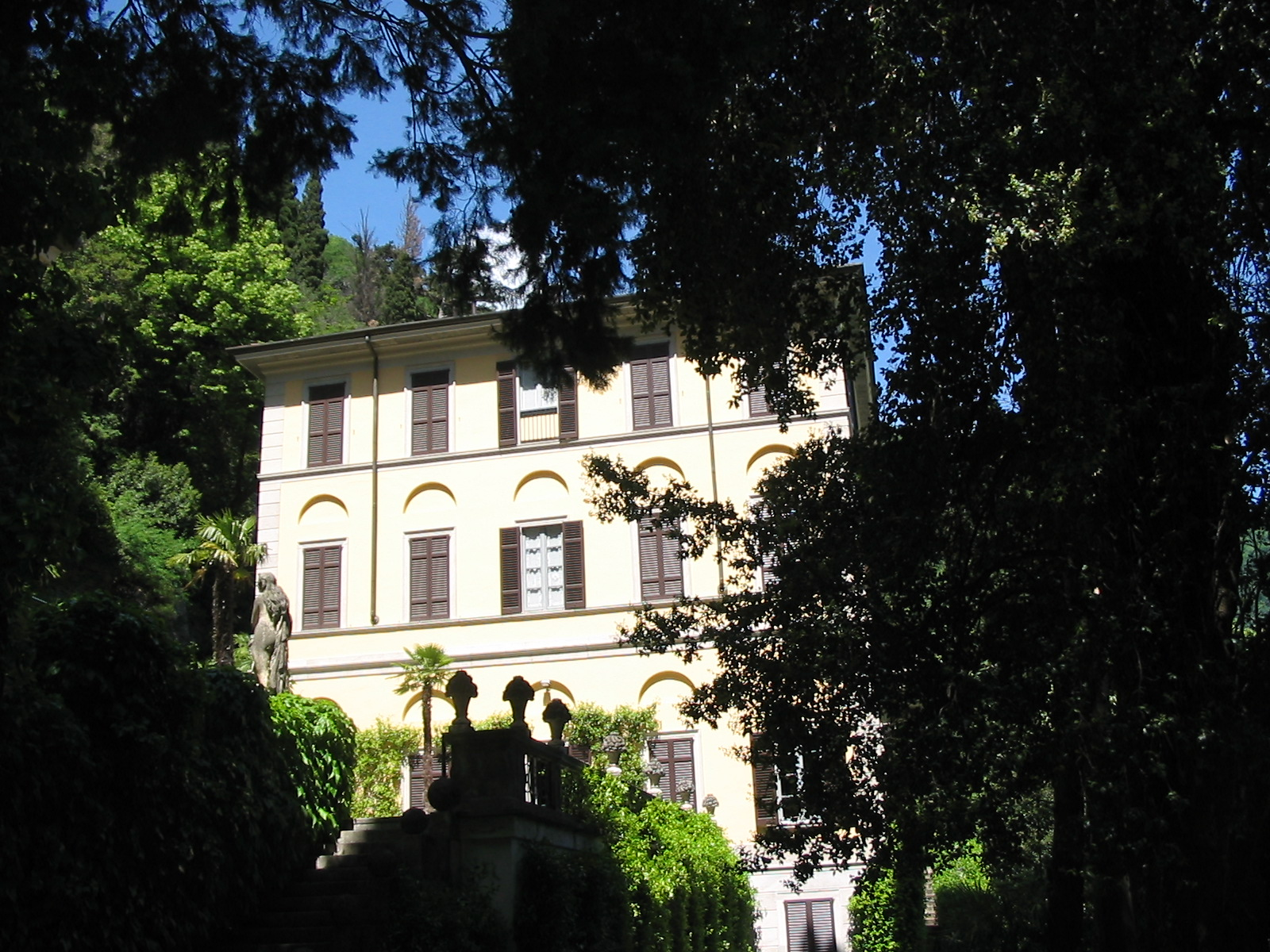
Villa Fontanelle in 2007

Villa Fontanelle is a villa (sometimes called a palazzo) near Moltrasio on Lake Como in Lombardy, Italy, about 50 kilometres (31 mi) from Milan. The four-storey yellow-painted building was built in the first half of the nineteenth century by the eccentric Lord Charles Currie, a visiting Englishman who fell in love with Lake Como. Failing to find a villa for sale, he decided to create his own, right on the water's edge. It was subsequently owned by Antonio Besana, a friend of the composer Giuseppe Verdi.

By 1977, when it was bought by Italian designer Gianni Versace, it was in a state of abandonment, and the designer set about restoring it to its former neoclassical glory. The work, completed in December 1980, included landscaping the three acres (1.2 ha) of ornamental gardens, which include three cottages, a tennis court, water frontage of some 800m and a private mooring.

Versace personally chose hundreds of oil paintings, and with other artworks displayed throughout the interior and exterior, he created a mini-palace that was a personal shrine. The English art historian and landscape gardener Roy Strong created the gardens of the villa for Versace. Strong also worked on the grounds of Versace's house in Miami, the Casa Casuarina.

Before Versace's death, celebrities such as Sir Elton John, Diana, Princess of Wales, Sting and Madonna were regular guests at the property. Since the death of Versace in 1997, however, only American singer Jennifer Lopez and her husband Cris Judd were known to have visited, having spent their honeymoon there in 2001. Otherwise, the property was largely a lifeless temple to Versace.

The estate is now owned by Russian millionaire restaurateur Arkady Novikov, who bought it for 33 million Euros in early 2008 and retained Milanese architect Claudio Pozza to undertake restoration works at the property.

== Gallery ==
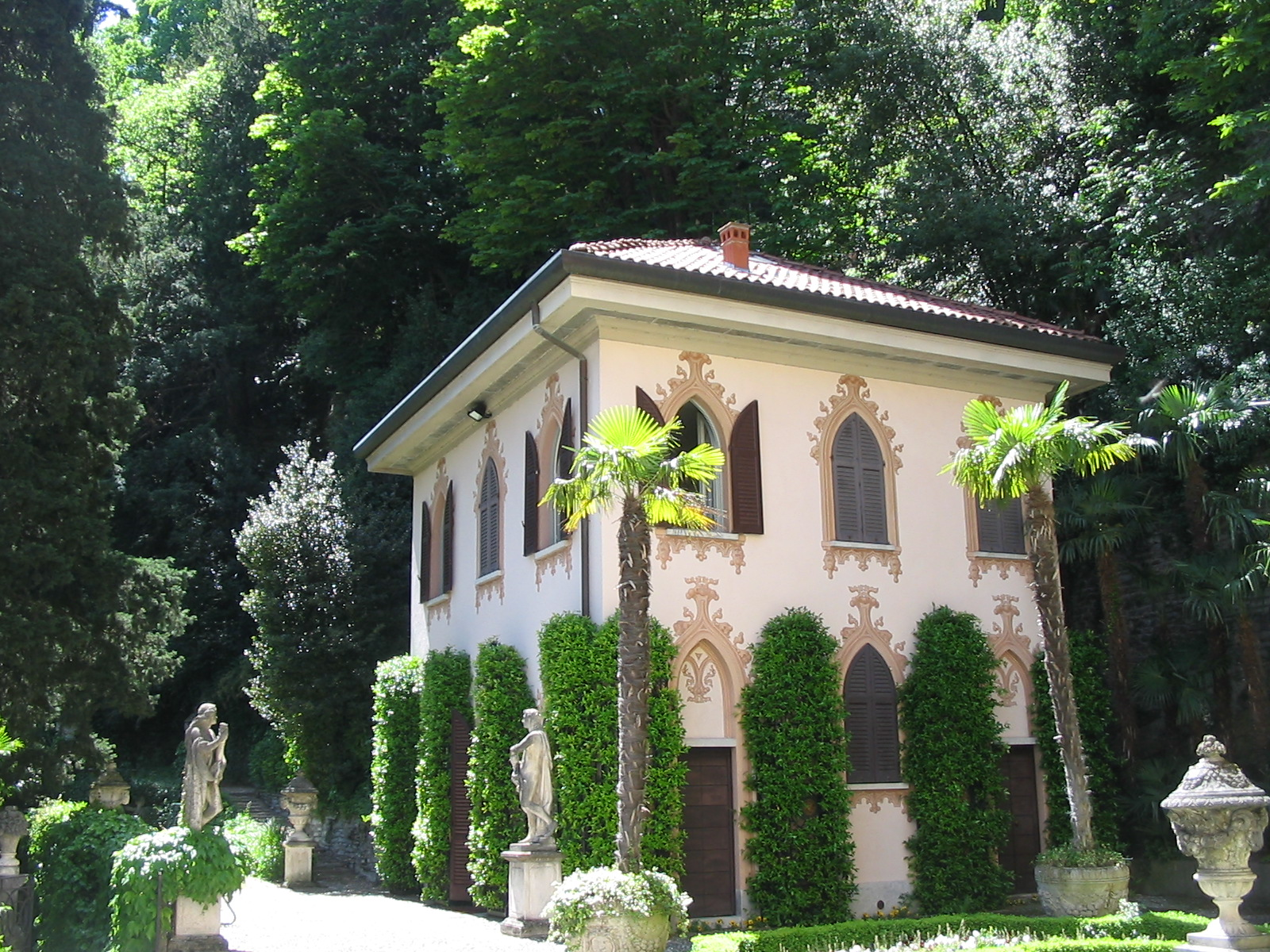

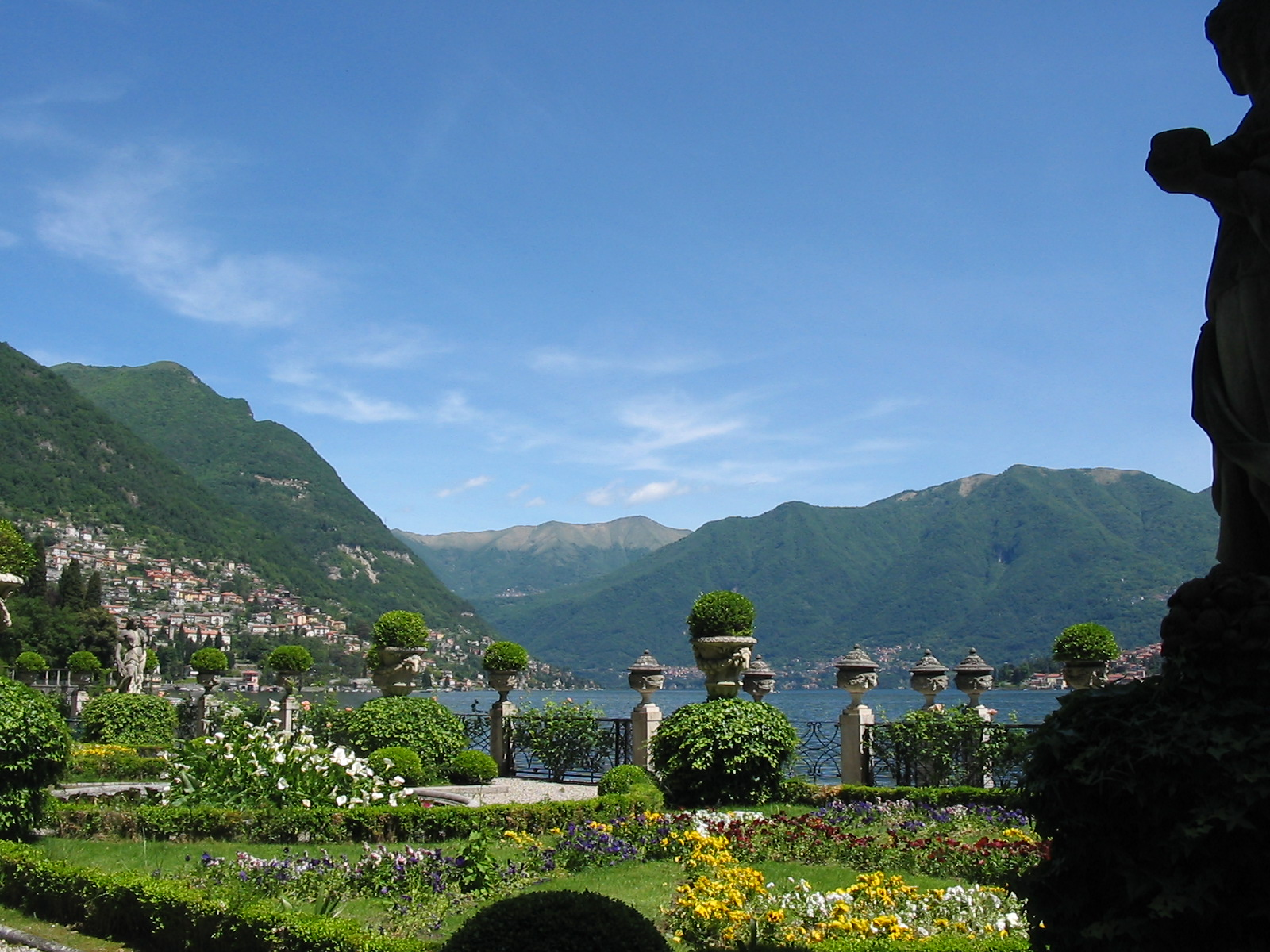

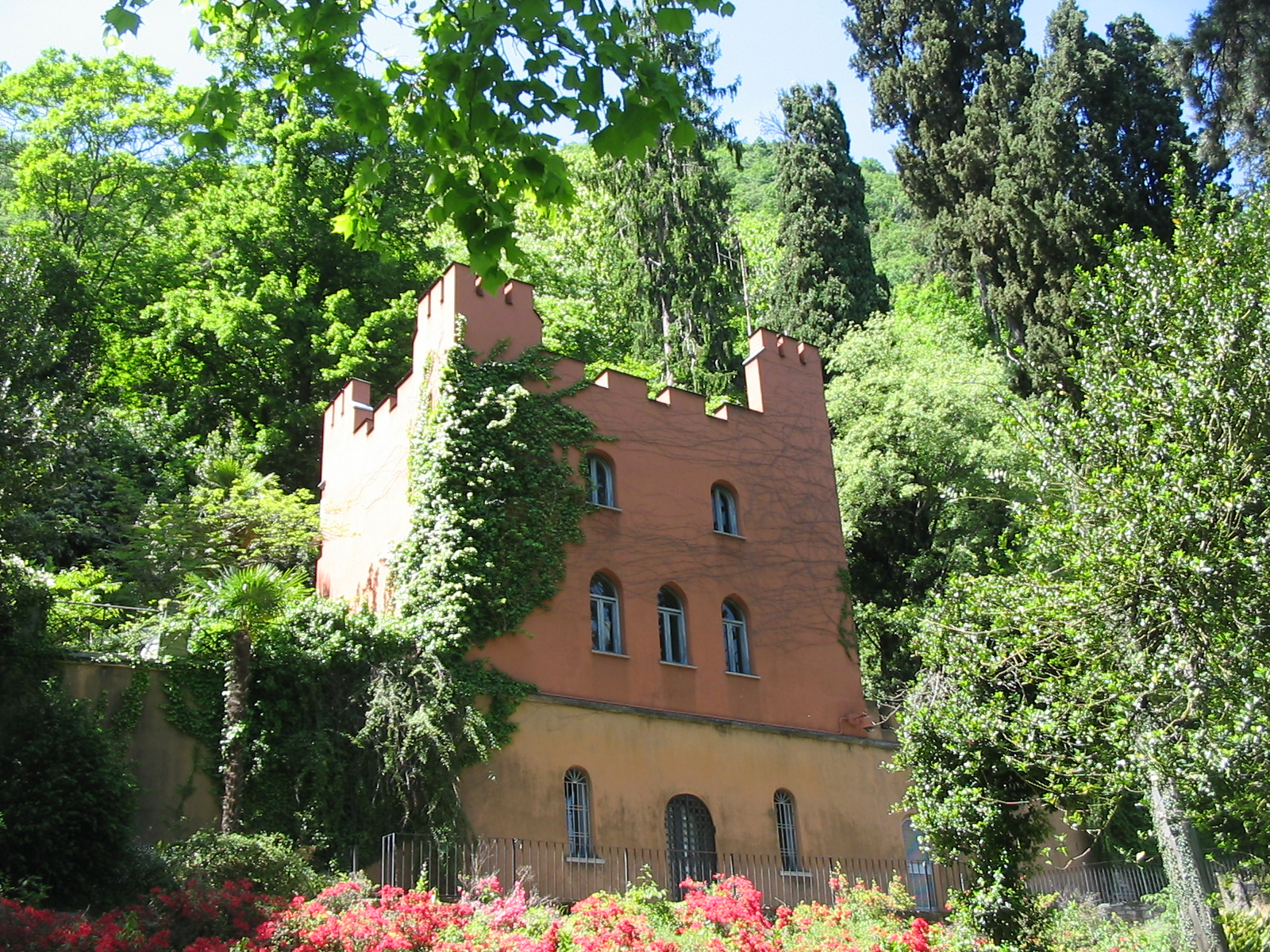
