= Casa Casuarina =

Former home of Gianni Versace

Coordinates: 25°46′55.2″N 80°7′50.2″W

The Villa Casa Casuarina
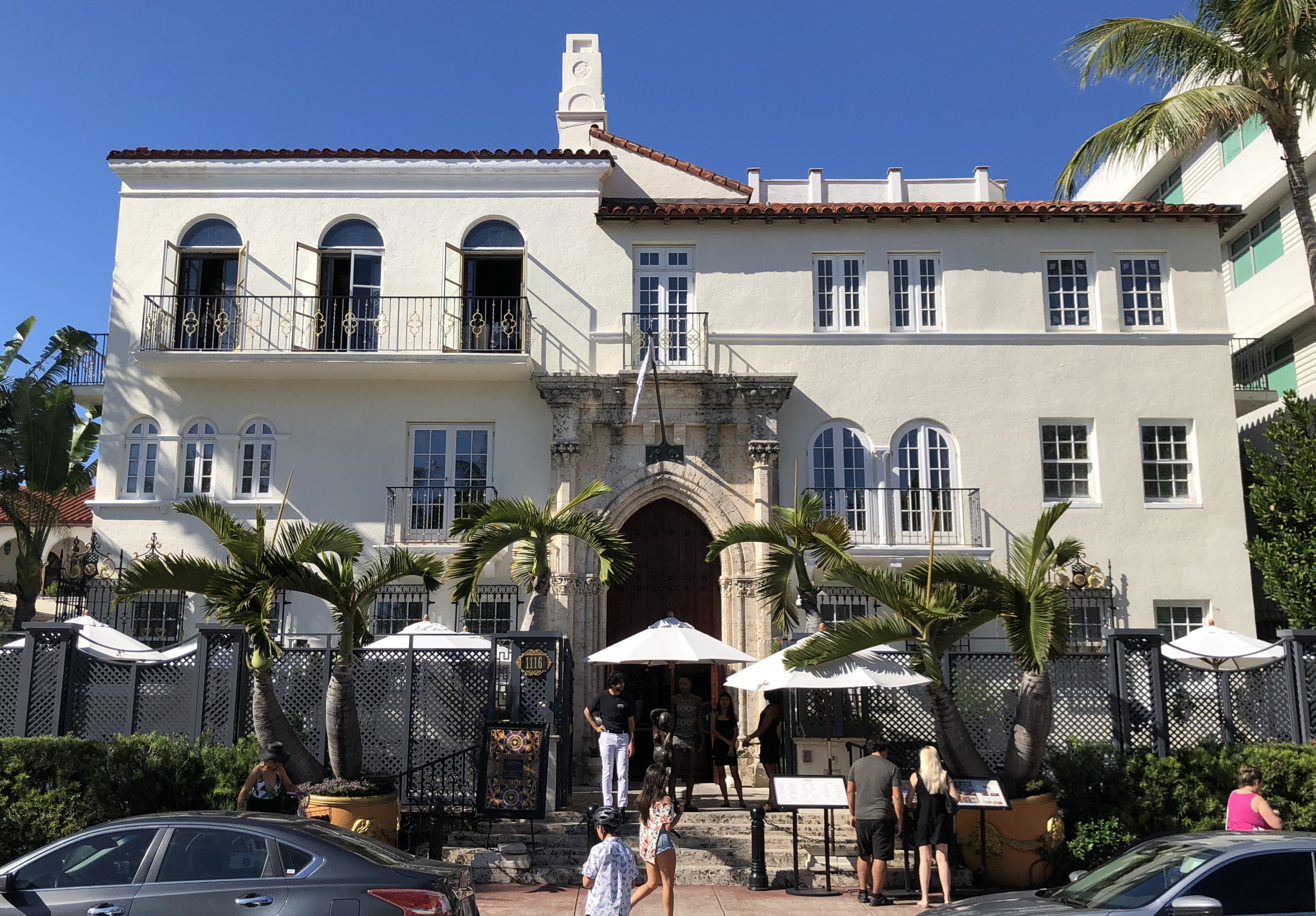
- Front of the building in 2019

General information
- Architectural style: Mediterranean Revival
- Location: 1116 Ocean Drive; Miami Beach, Florida, U.S.
- Owner: Nakash family
- Operator: VM South Beach LLC

Technical details
- Floor count: 3

Other information
- Number of suites: 10
- Number of restaurants: 1

Website
- vmmiamibeach.com

Casa Casuarina, also known as the Versace Mansion, is an American property built in 1930, renowned for being owned by and the place of the murder of the Italian fashion designer Gianni Versace; he lived there from 1992 until his death in 1997. It is located at 1116 Ocean Drive in the South Beach neighborhood of Miami Beach, Florida, in the Miami Beach Architectural District. Since 2015, it has been adapted into and operates as a luxury boutique hotel known as The Villa Casa Casuarina.

== History ==
=== Alden Freeman ===
Casa Casuarina was built in 1930 by Ronin Wolf in the Mediterranean Revival style for Alden Freeman, a philanthropist bachelor who was heir to a Standard Oil fortune. It is rumored that during construction, a time capsule was hidden in one of the walls.

Freeman said the structure was modeled on the Alcázar de Colón, with its Coralline rock blocks. A block from the Alcázar de Colón structure is located on the right side of the main entrance. Addison Mizner designed the interior, including the use of key lime coral flooring.

The name translates to "house of the Australian pine". Commentators suggest that it was named after a W. Somerset Maugham novel, Under the Casuarina Tree, or maybe refers to a tree on the lot that survived the 1926 Miami hurricane.

Major architecture features included an observatory and a small replica of the Homage Tower from the Fortaleza Ozama in the Dominican Republic. About 100 medallions of notable political figures, including Lenin, Mussolini, and Julius Caesar, are installed on the walls.

Freeman lived in the house with his adopted son Charles Boulton and Boulton's family. He died at the house on December 29, 1937.

=== Amsterdam Palace ===
Jacques Amsterdam acquired the house for $100,000 and converted it into a 24-unit apartment building, naming it The Amsterdam Palace. It changed hands several times and was renamed as the Christopher Columbus Apartments, in commemoration of its architectural features referring to Mediterranean style.

By the early 1980s, it had fallen into disrepair. Don Johnson, one of the main actors in the TV police drama series Miami Vice, recalled that in 1984 when they were filming scenes for the show's pilot episode inside the building, it was in such a run-down state that there were holes in the floors.

=== Gianni Versace ===
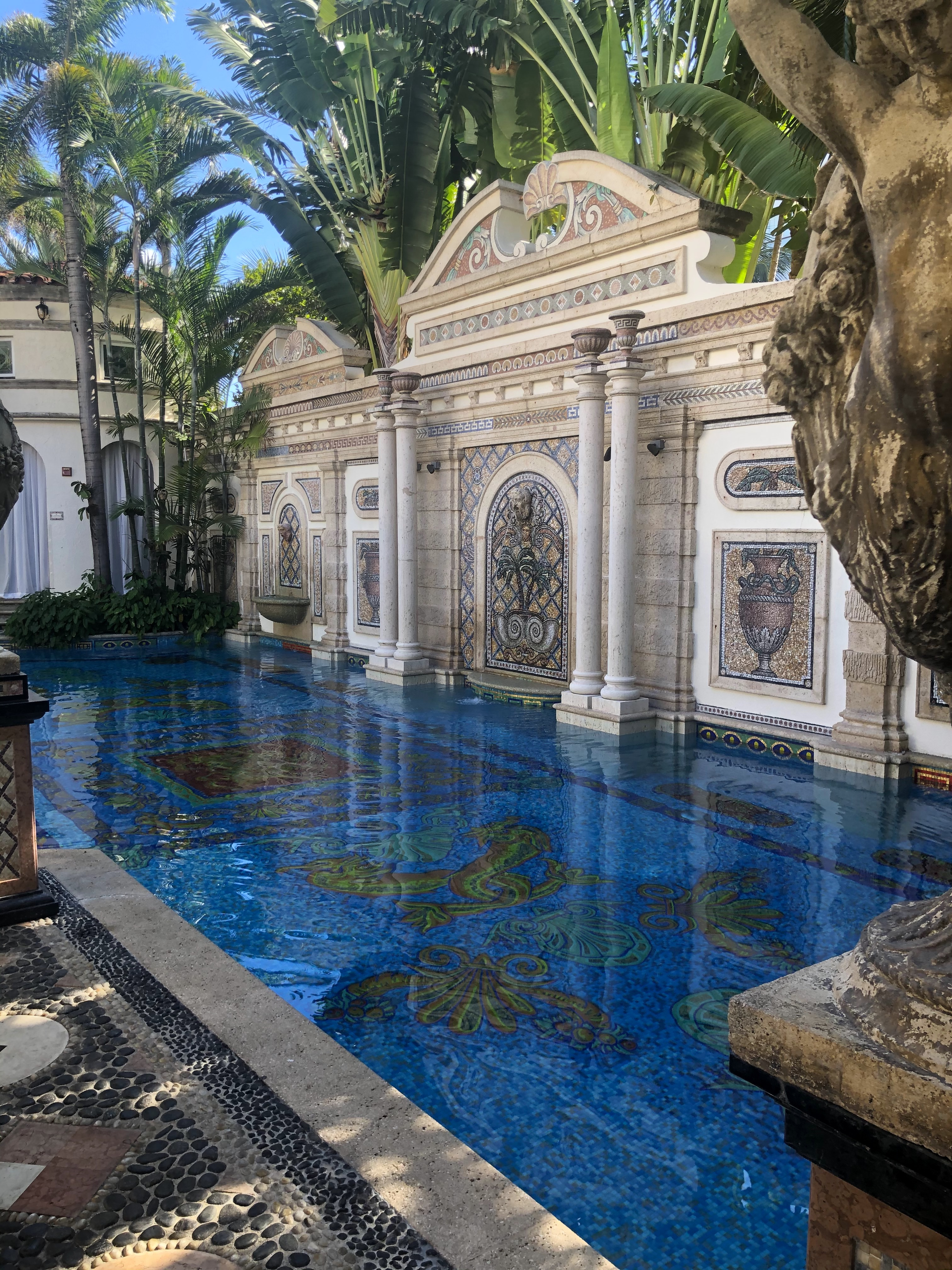
Thousand Mosaic Pool installed during Gianni Versace's ownership.

Gianni Versace bought the house for $2.95 million in 1992. It received extensive renovation and he restored the original name and returned it to private use, creating 8 bedrooms, 2 kitchens, 3 sitting rooms, 10 bathrooms, a bar, a library, and 4 living rooms. He installed modern systems, including central air conditioning. In 1993, Versace bought the adjoining Revere Hotel to the south for $3.7 million, which he tore down to make a pool and garden area for his house. The pool is known as the renowned Thousand Mosaic Pool, adorned with thousands of 24-karat gold tiles imported from Italy. Versace commissioned Sir Roy Strong, an English art historian and landscape designer, to work on creating the garden. He also had created gardens at Versace's Villa Fontanelle on Lake Como in Italy.

On July 15, 1997, Versace was fatally shot in front of the house by Andrew Cunanan.

=== Post-Versace ===
In 2000, the mansion was purchased by Peter Loftin for $19 million. He renovated the property for use as a boutique hotel, restaurant, and luxury event space. The restaurant was Il Sole at The Villa Casa Casuarina.

The mansion was bought by VM South Beach LLC (owned by the Nakash family) for $41.5 million in 2013. Since 2015, The Villa Casa Casuarina has been a luxury hotel with ten unique suites. The gourmet restaurant Gianni's is housed there.

== Gallery ==
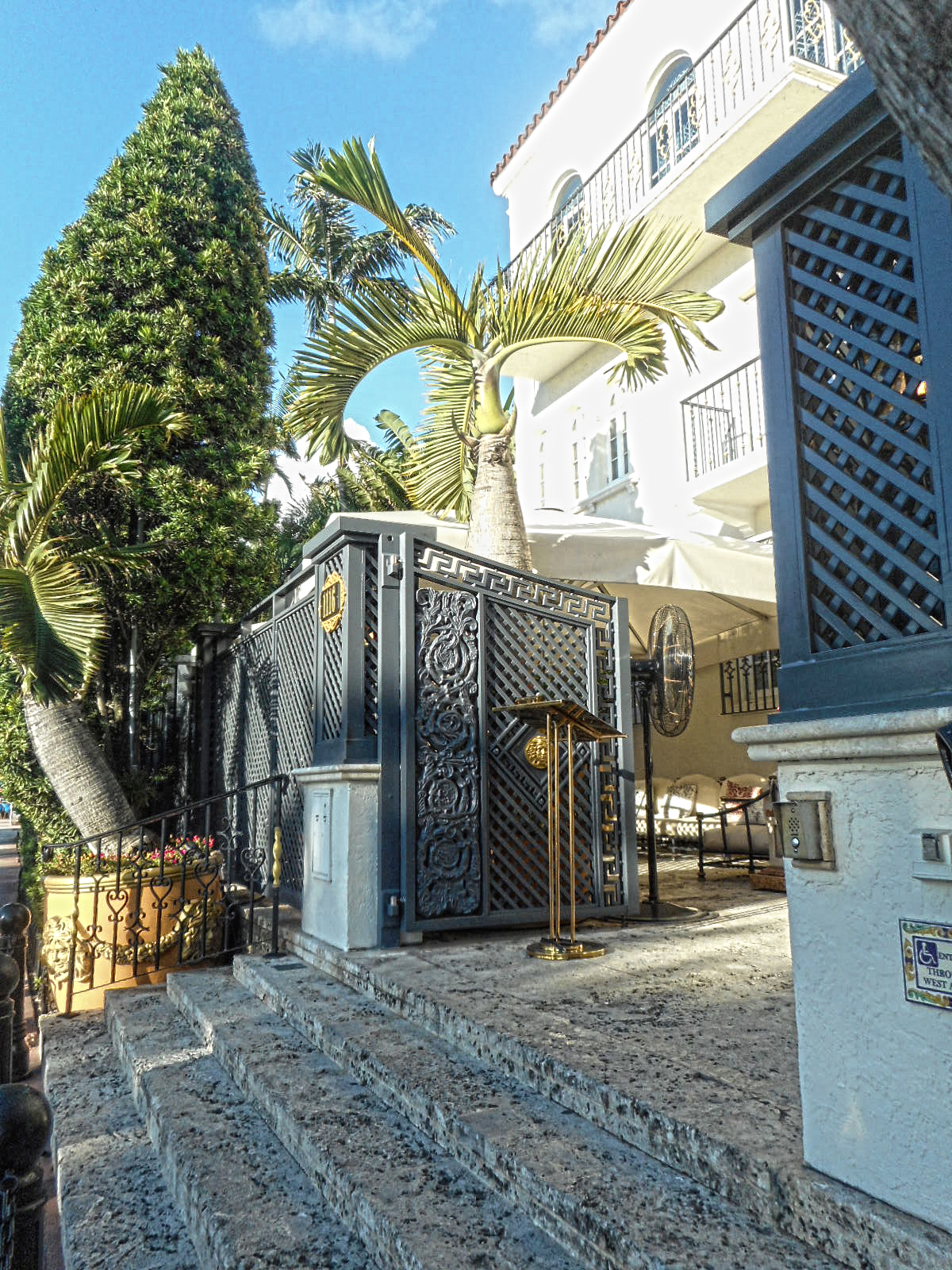
Entrance steps where Gianni Versace was shot by Andrew Cunanan

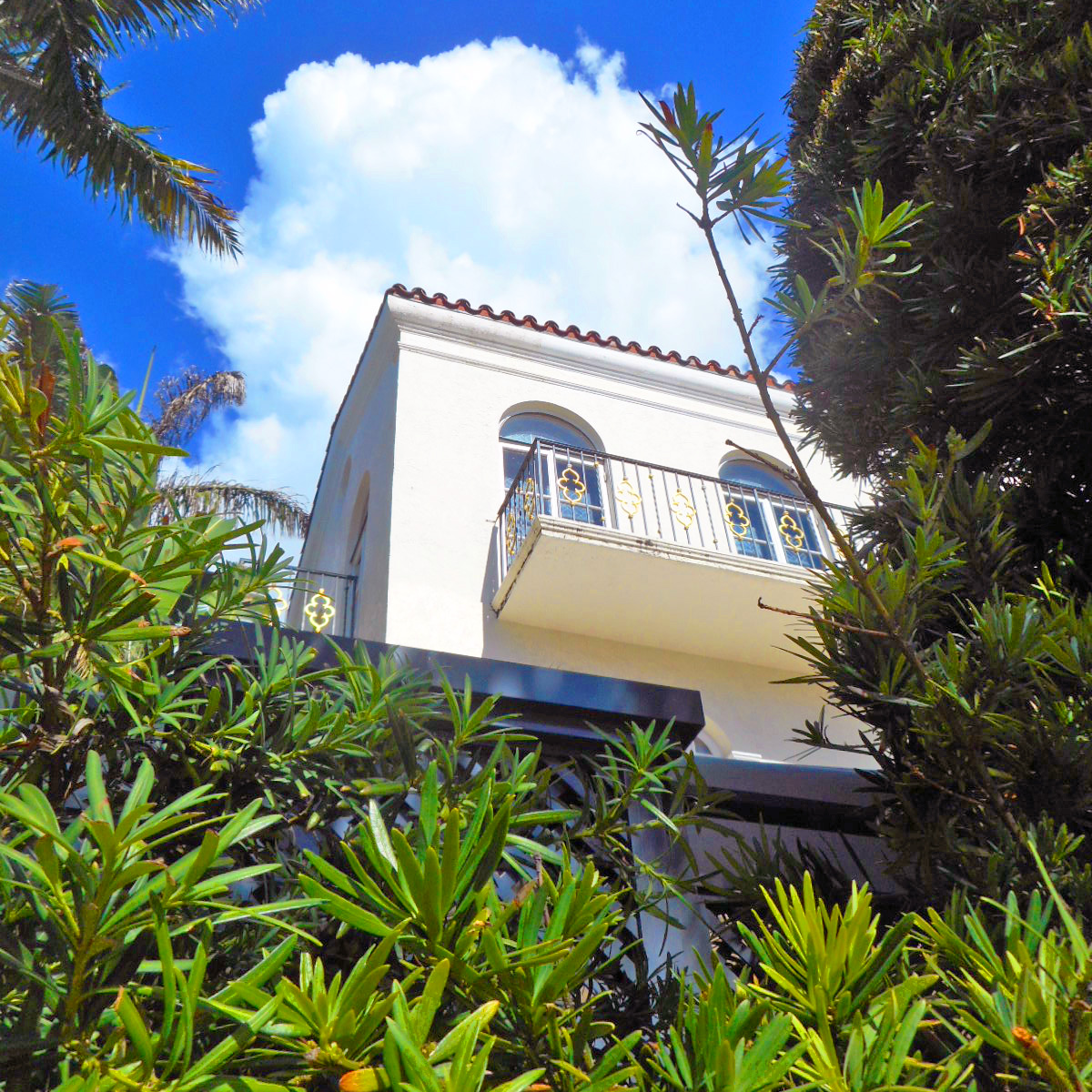
Casa Casuarina - View of balcony

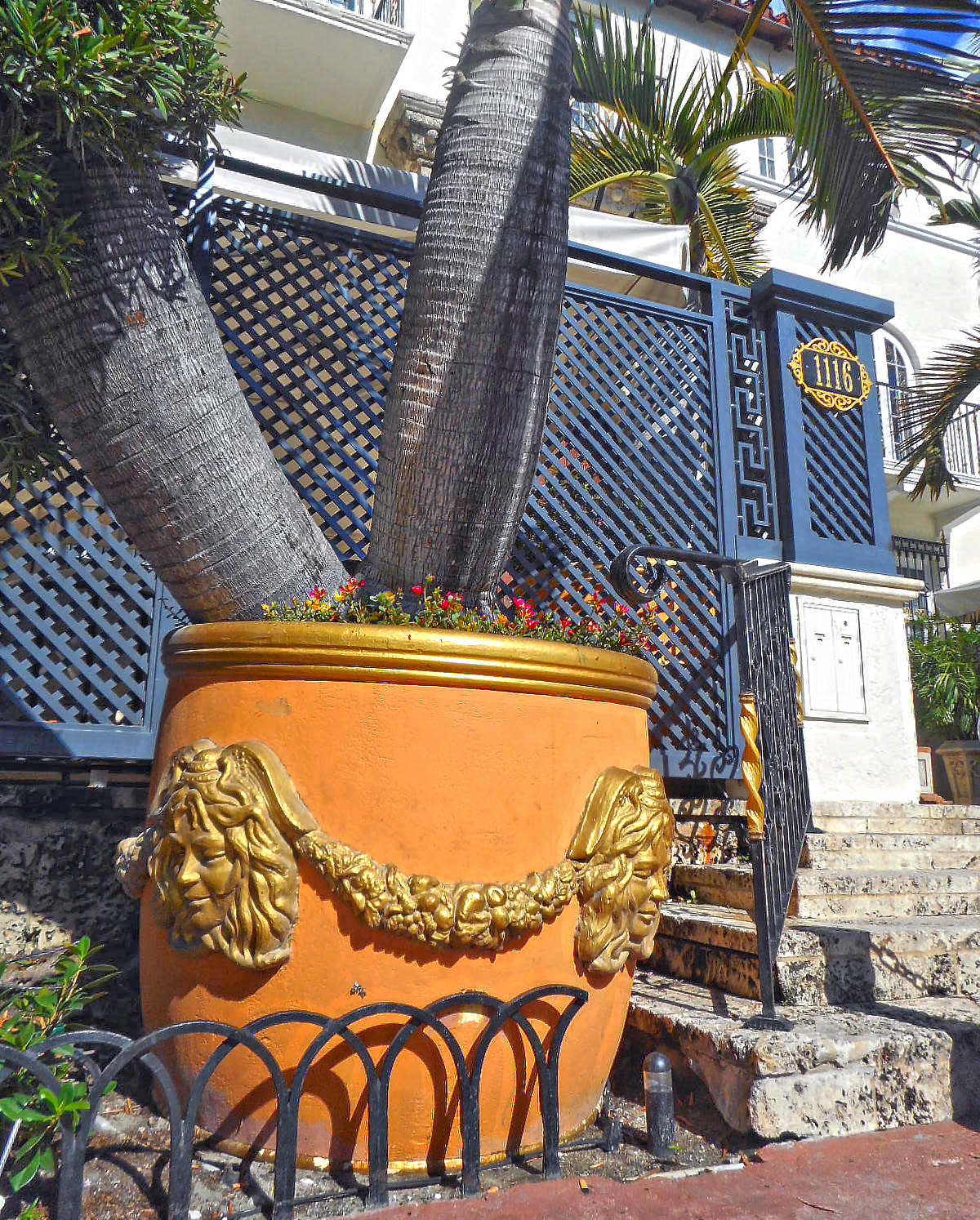
Orange and gold planters outside Versace Mansion

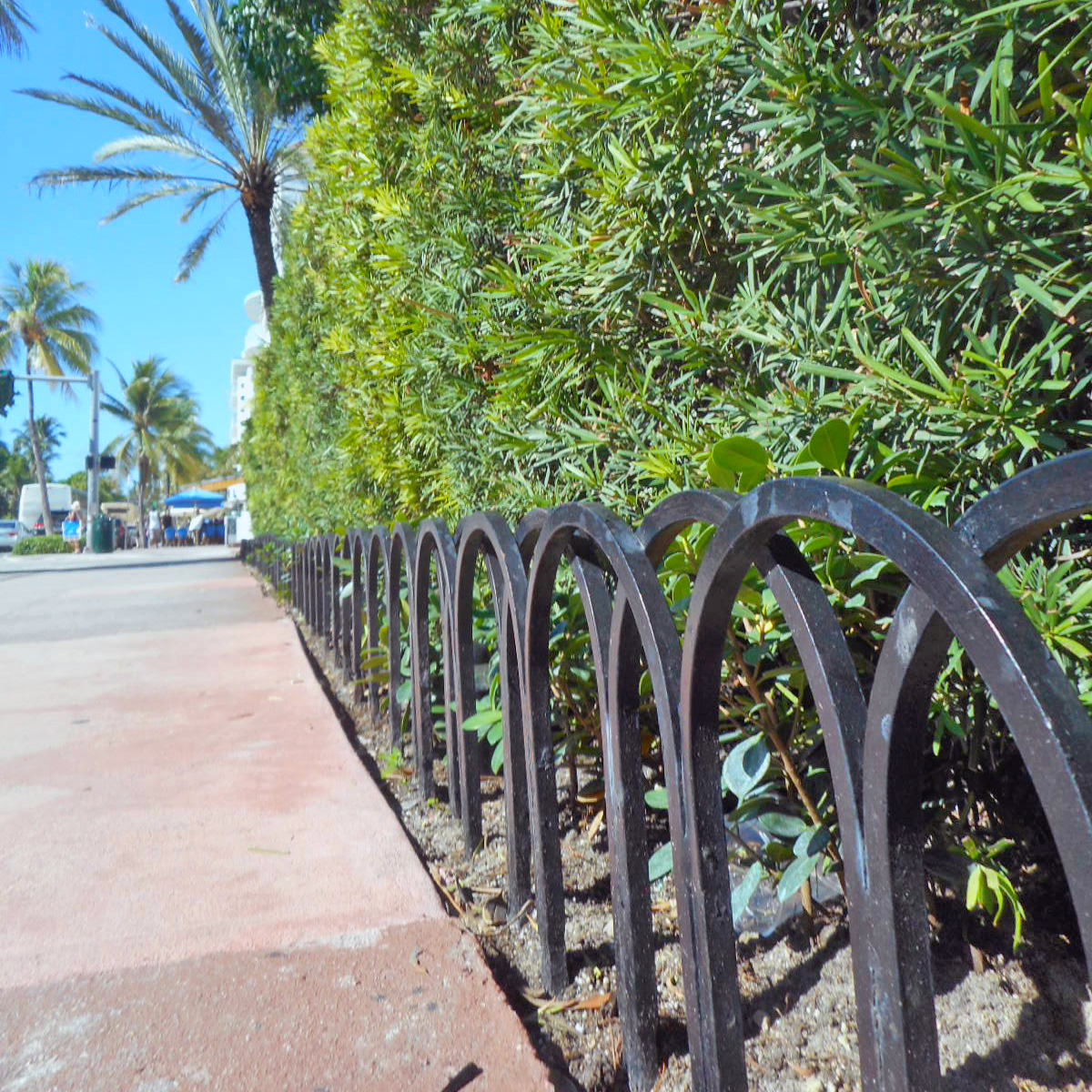
Perimeter street metal railing

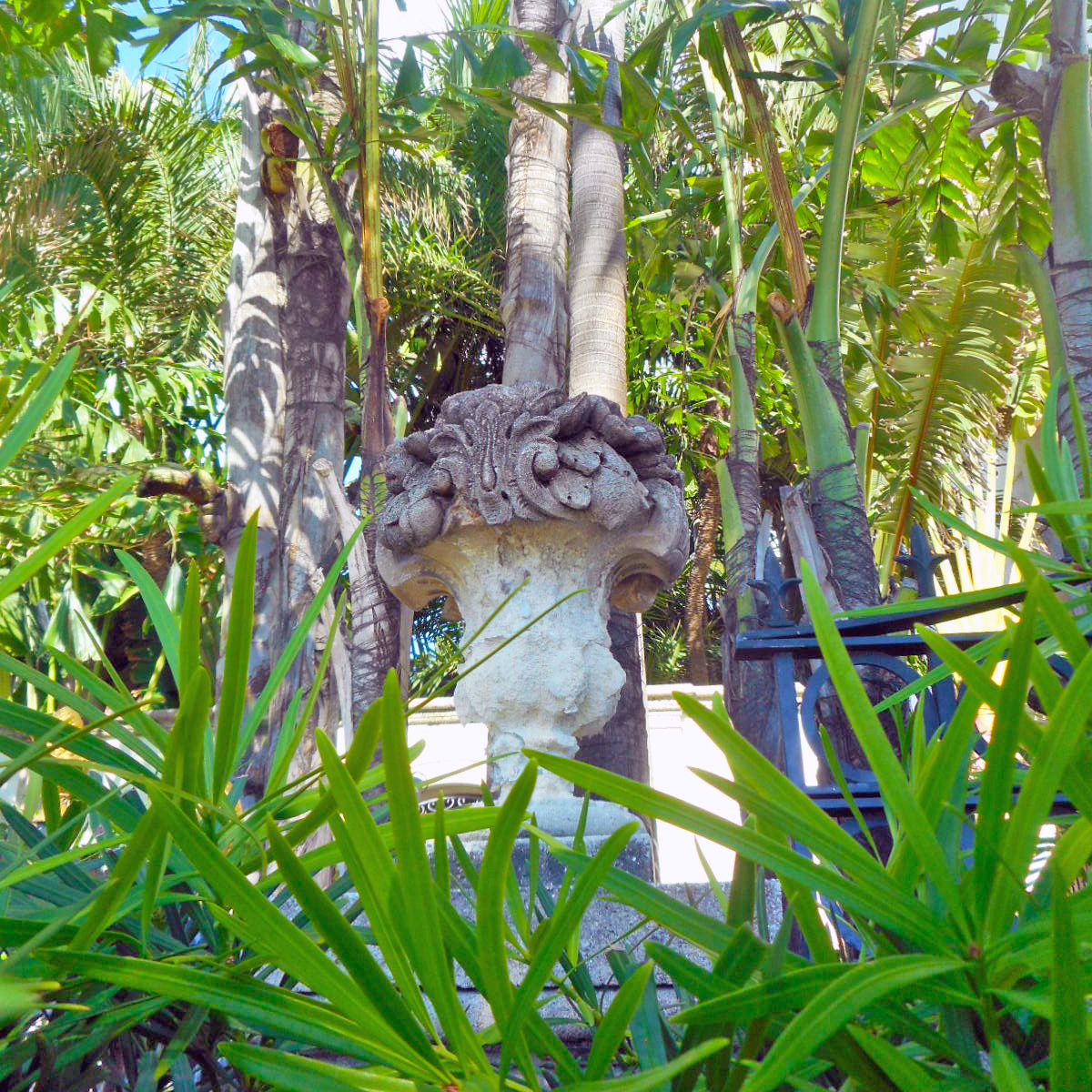
Wall fruit bowl detail

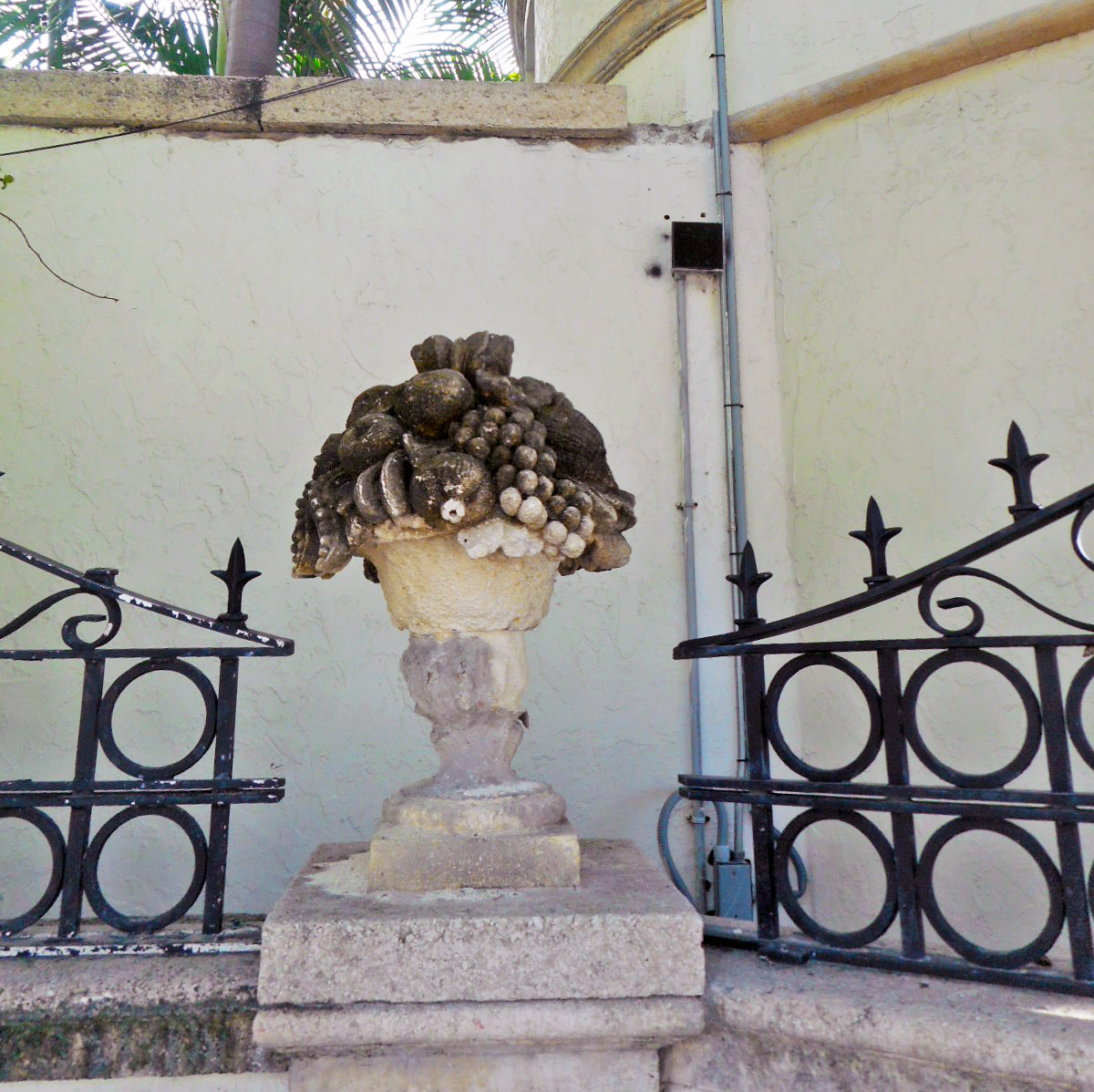
Another wall fruit bowl

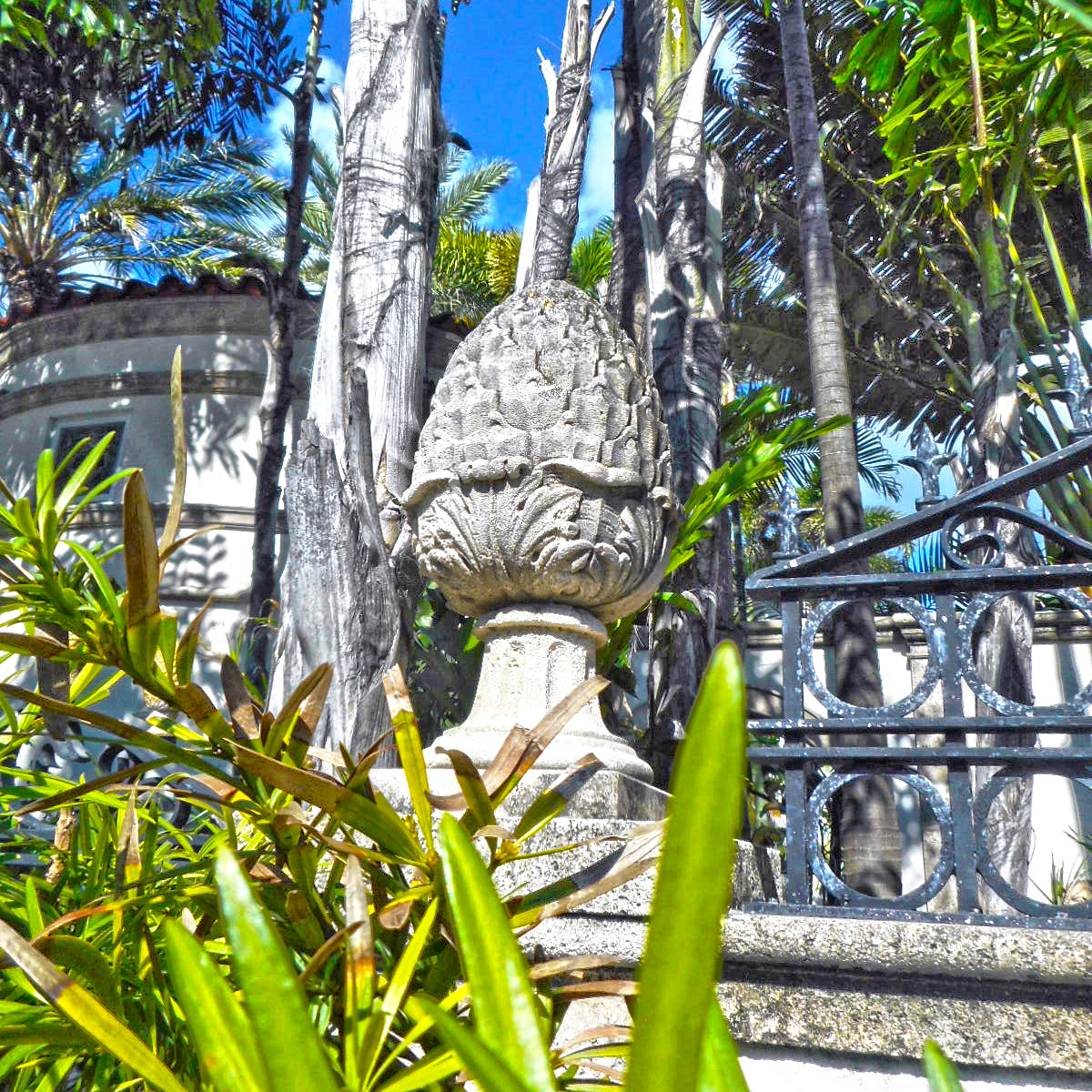
Wall pine cone detail

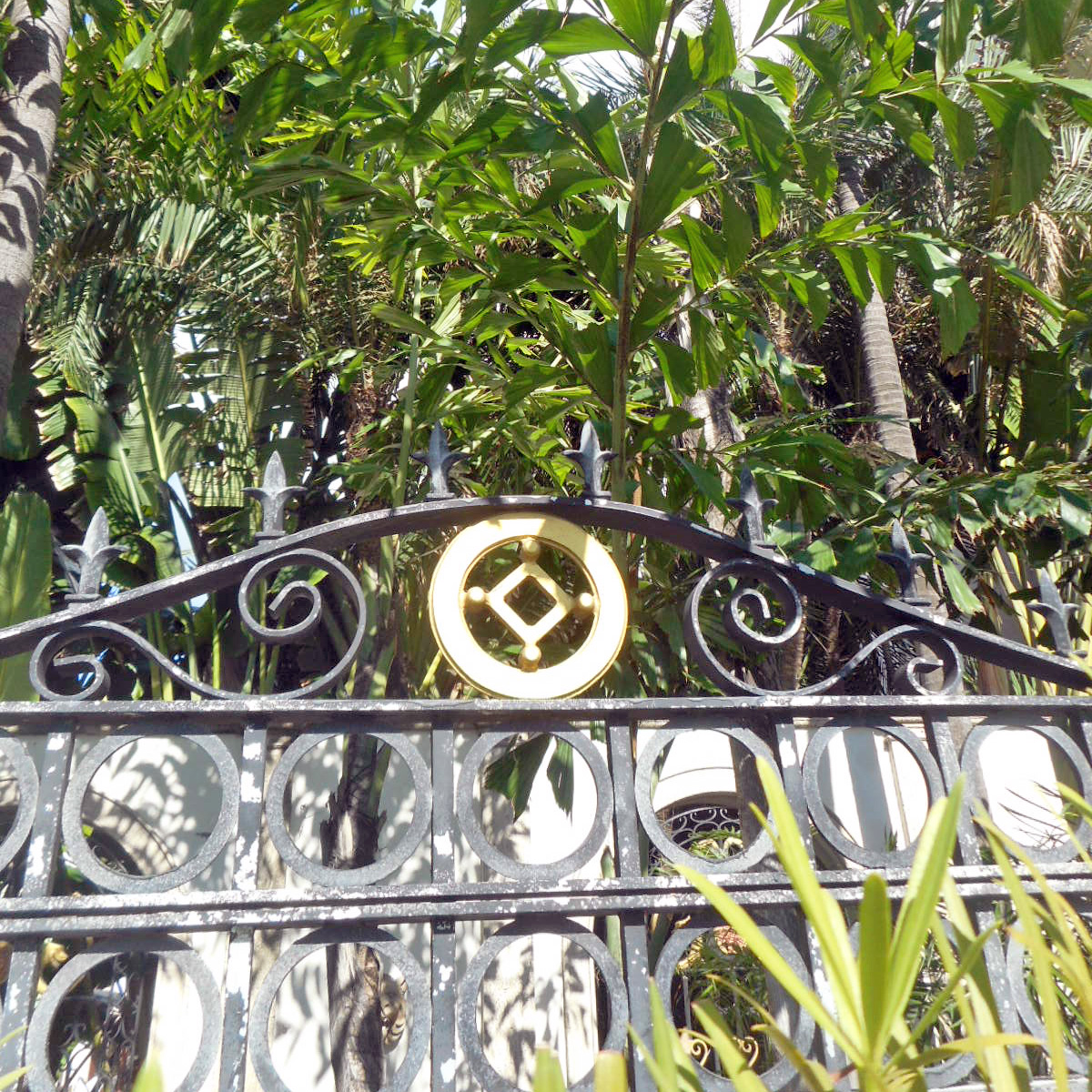
Wall wrought iron round medallion

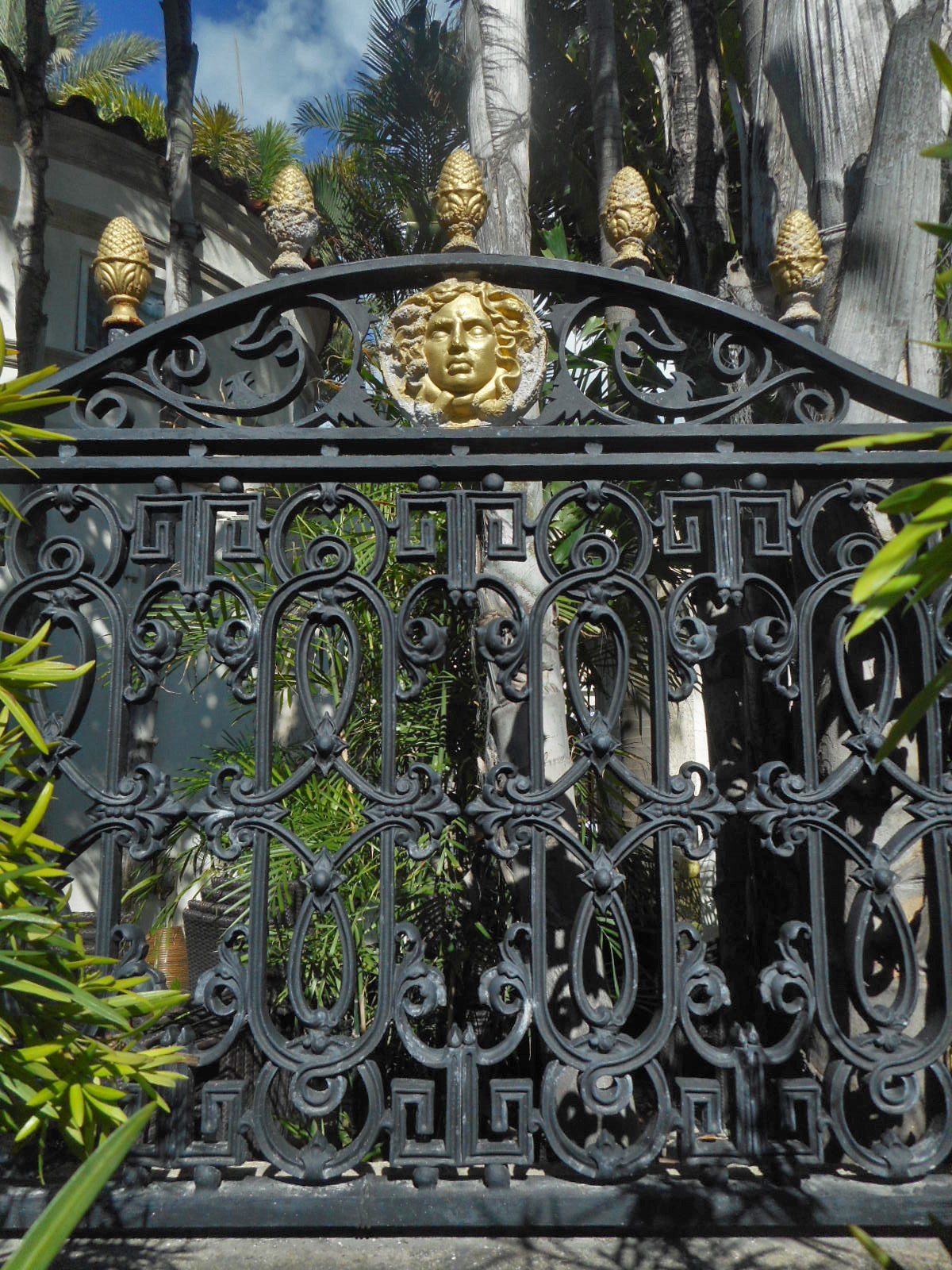
Head of Medusa and pine cones

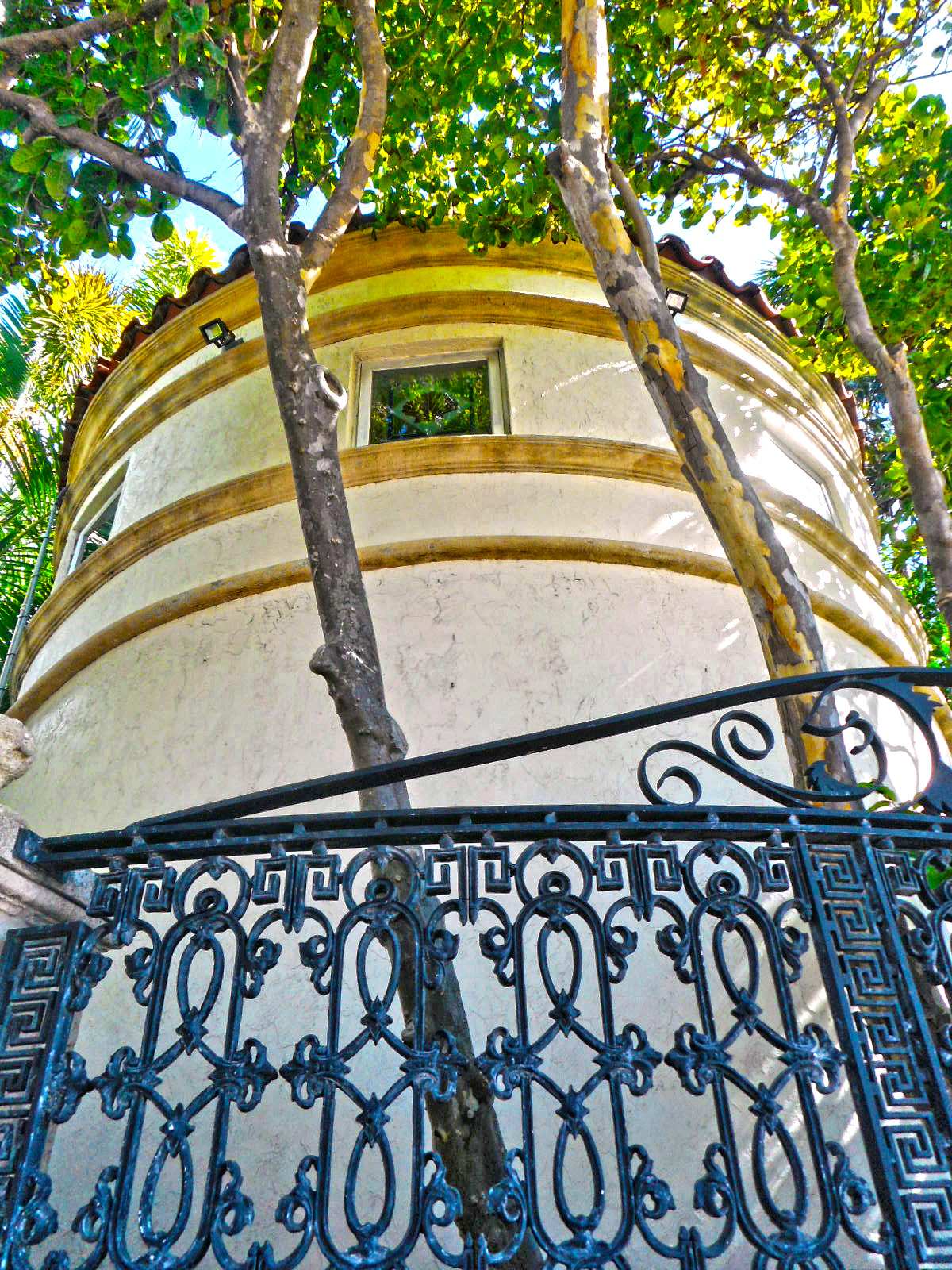
Round tower and iron fence

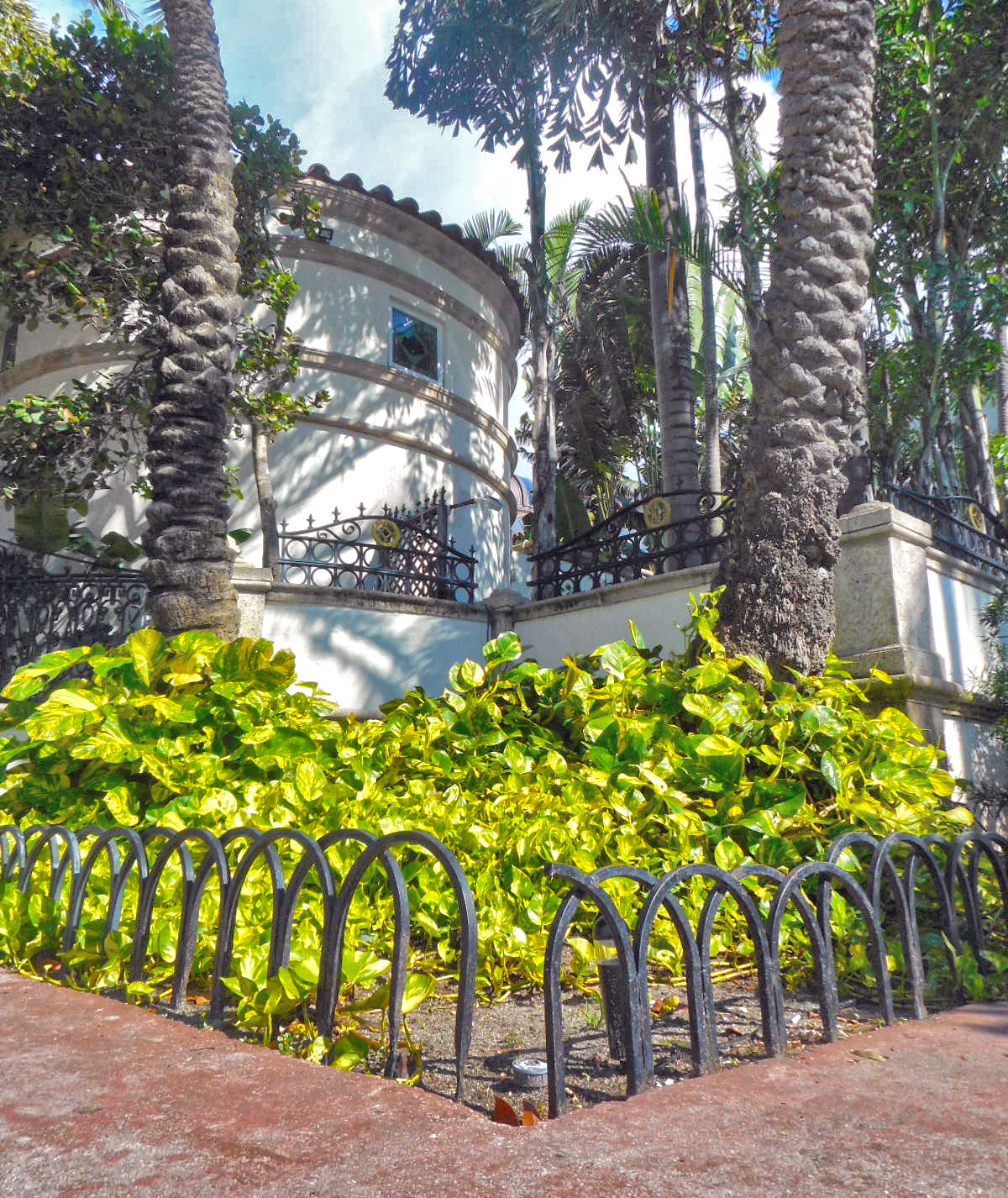
South east corner

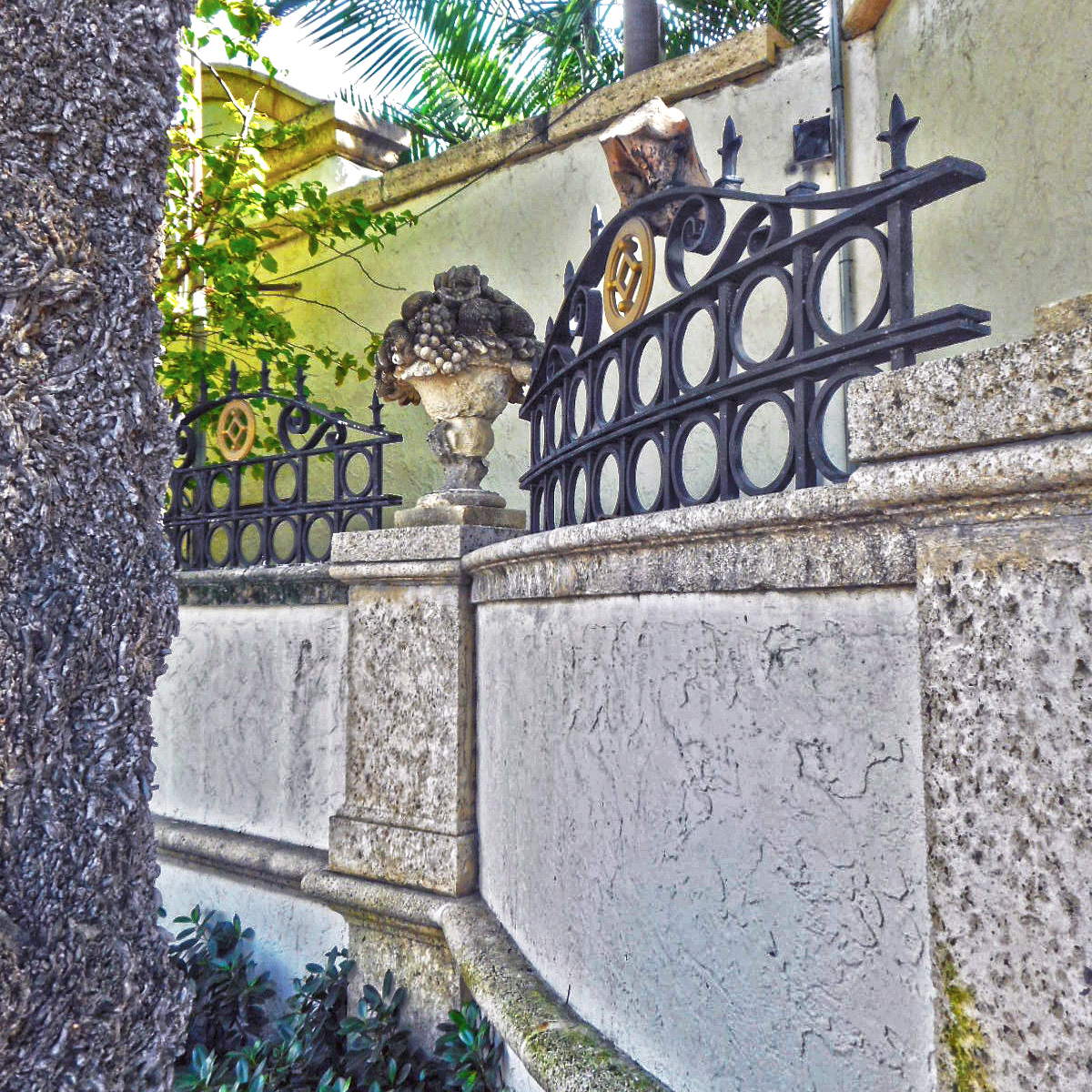
Perimeter wall details - south side

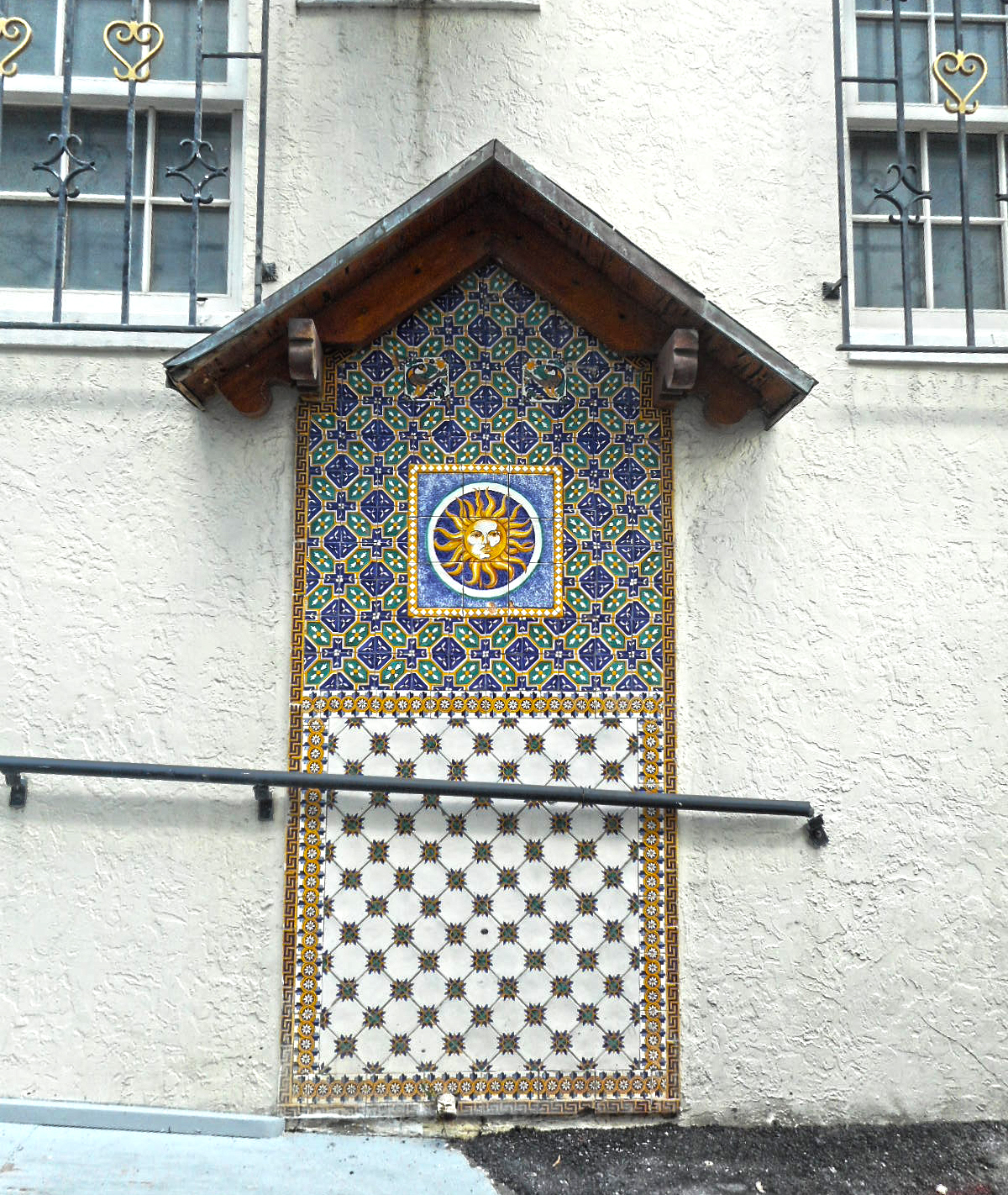
Alleyway handicap entrance for Versace Mansion

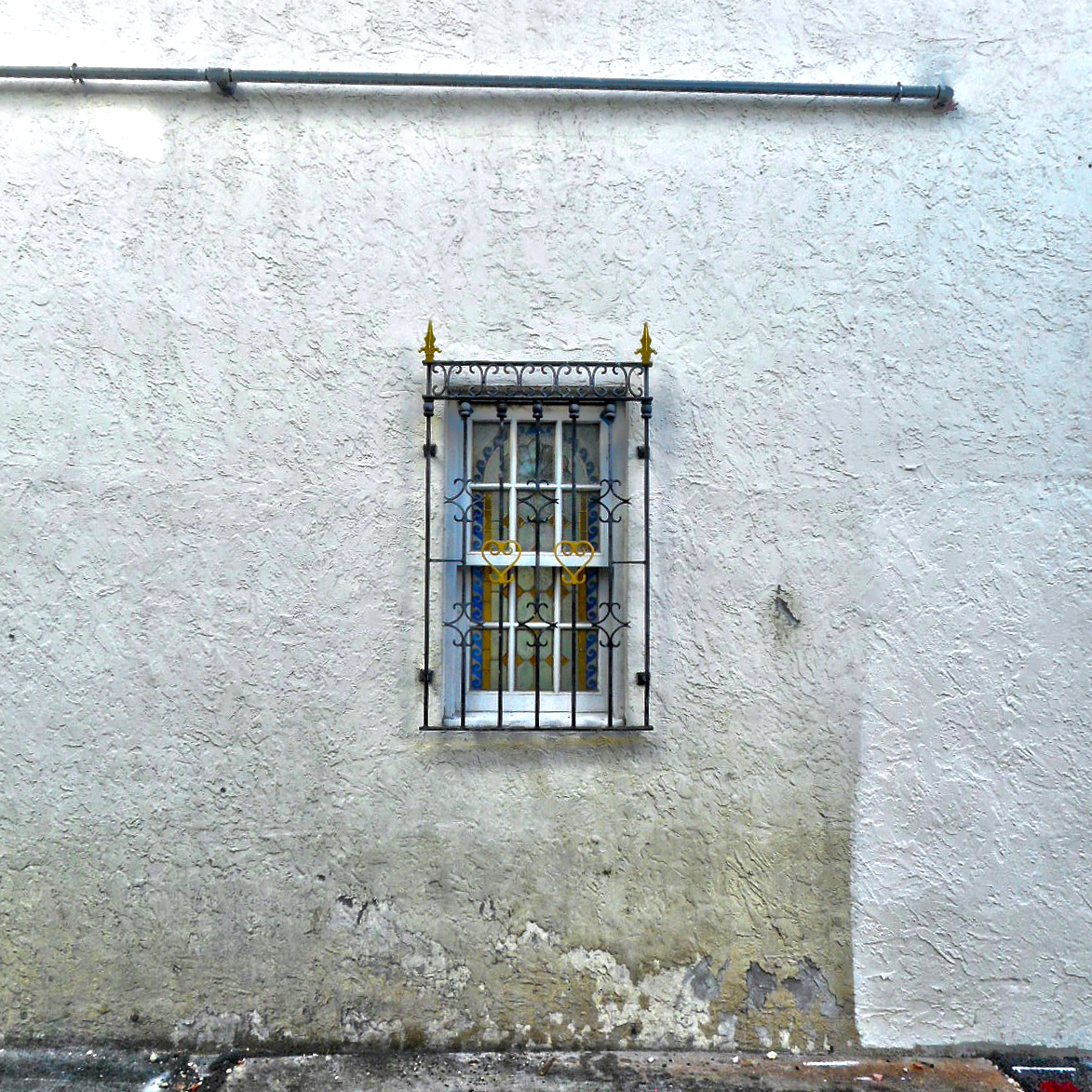
Small window in alleyway

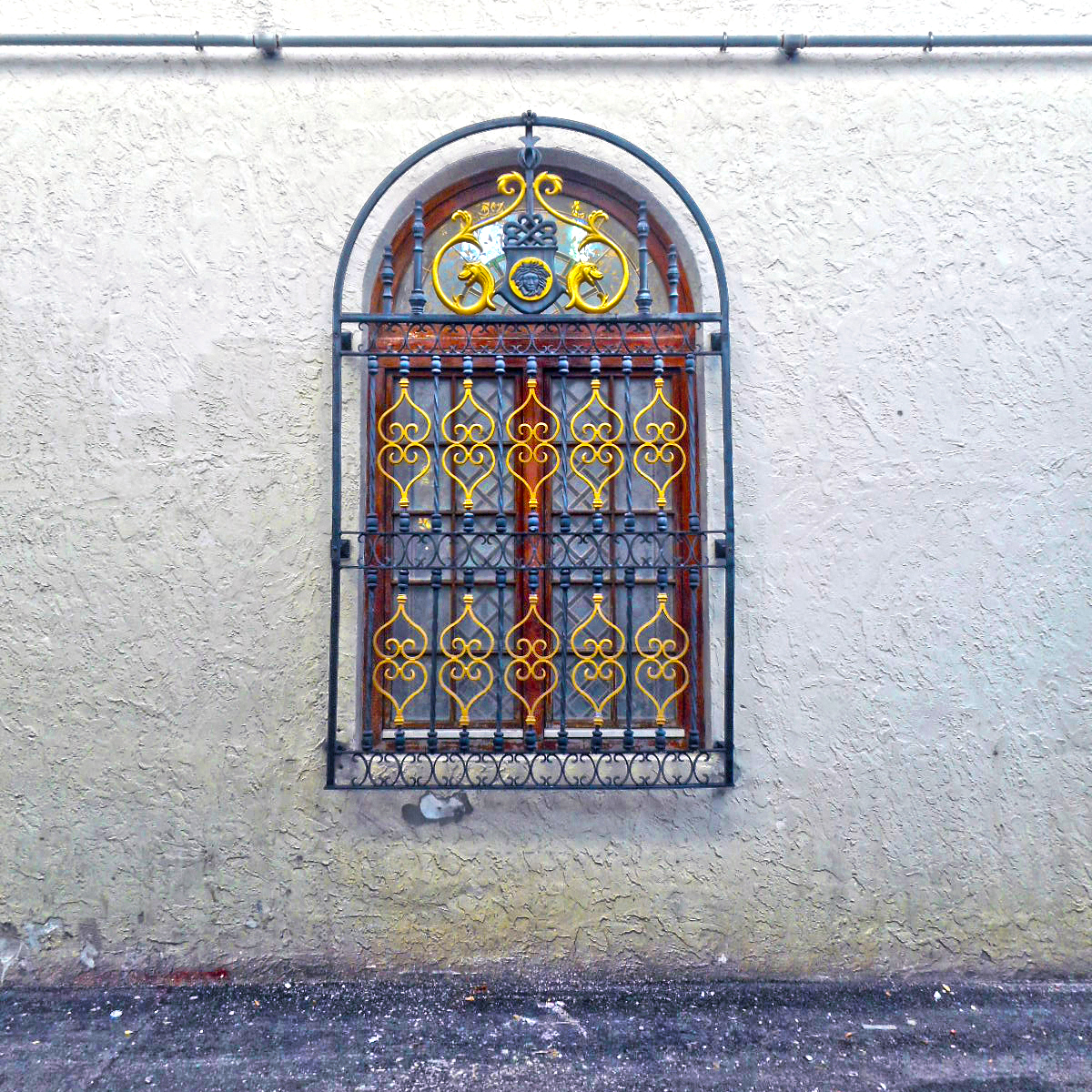
Large window in alleyway

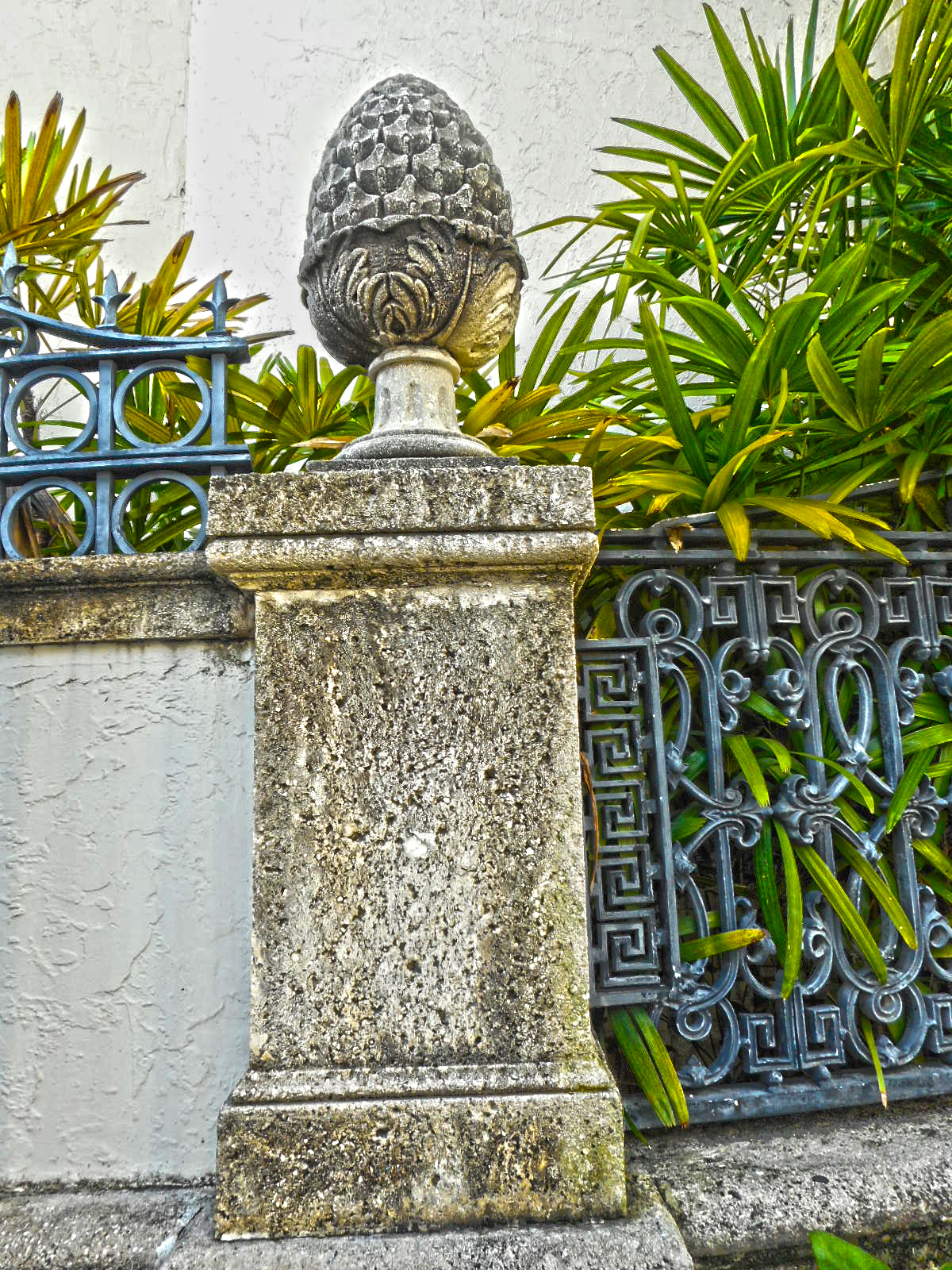
Perimeter wall masonry pine cone

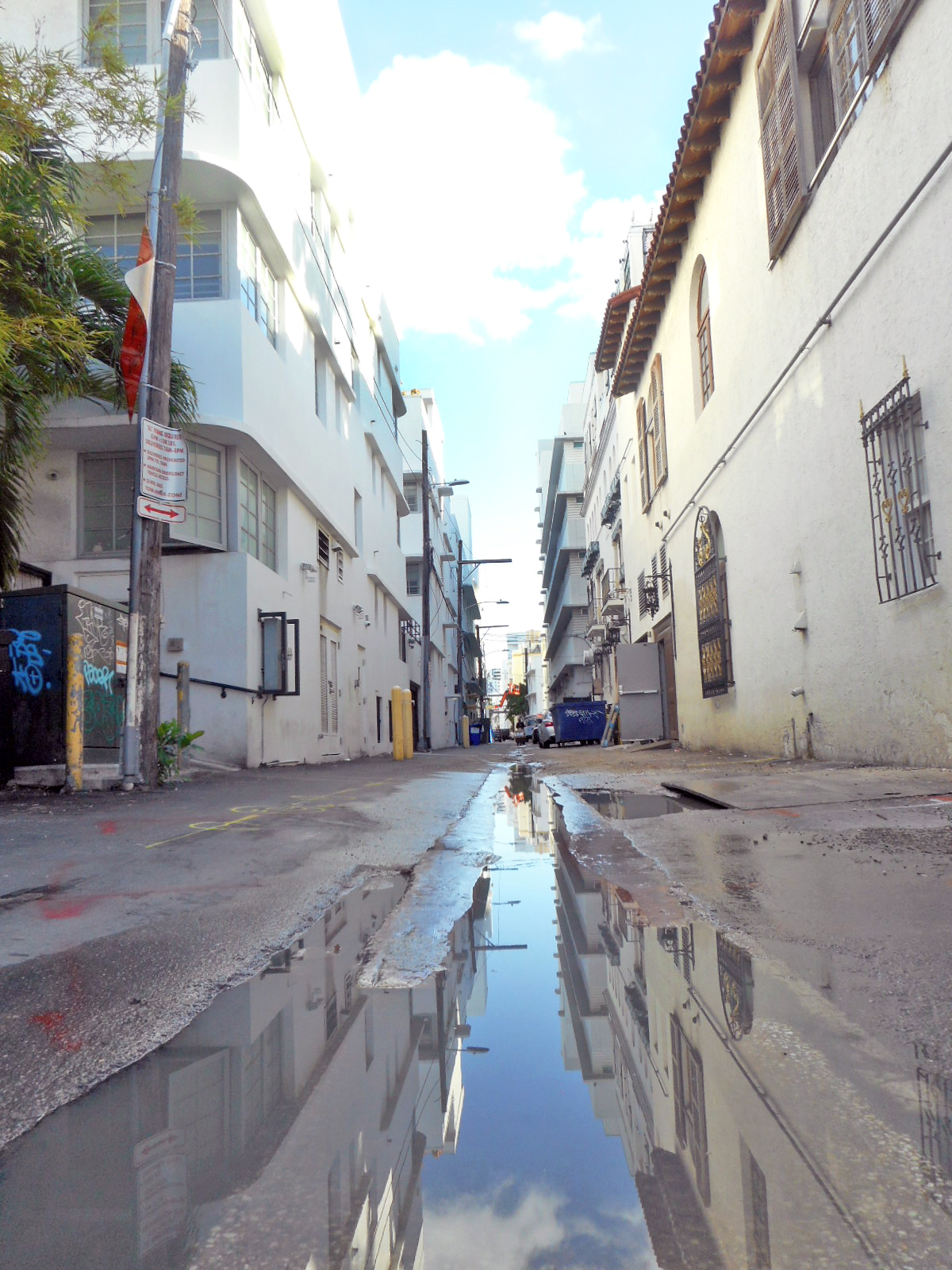
Alleyway looking north

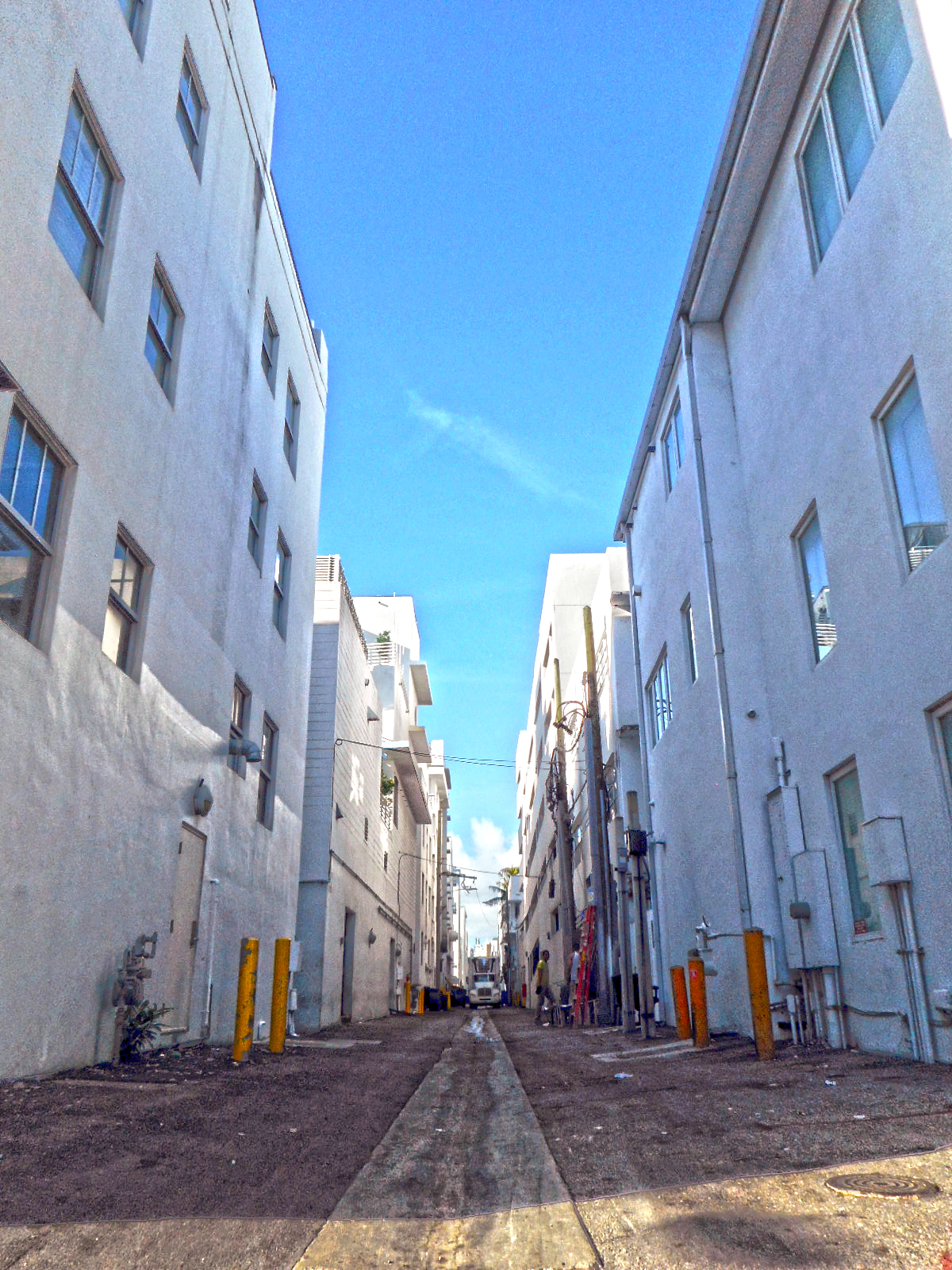
Alleyway behind building looking south

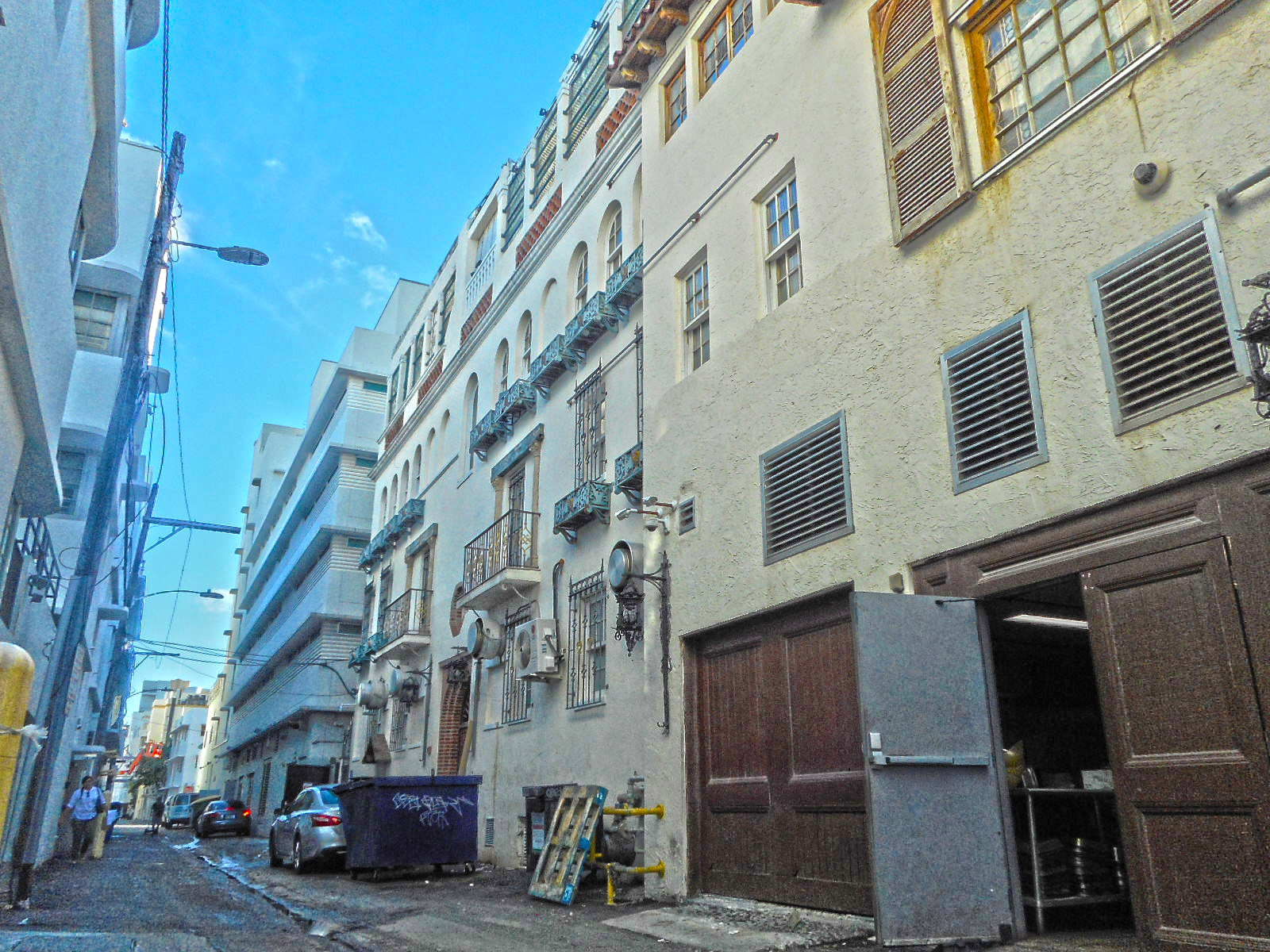
Rear of mansion - alleyway view north

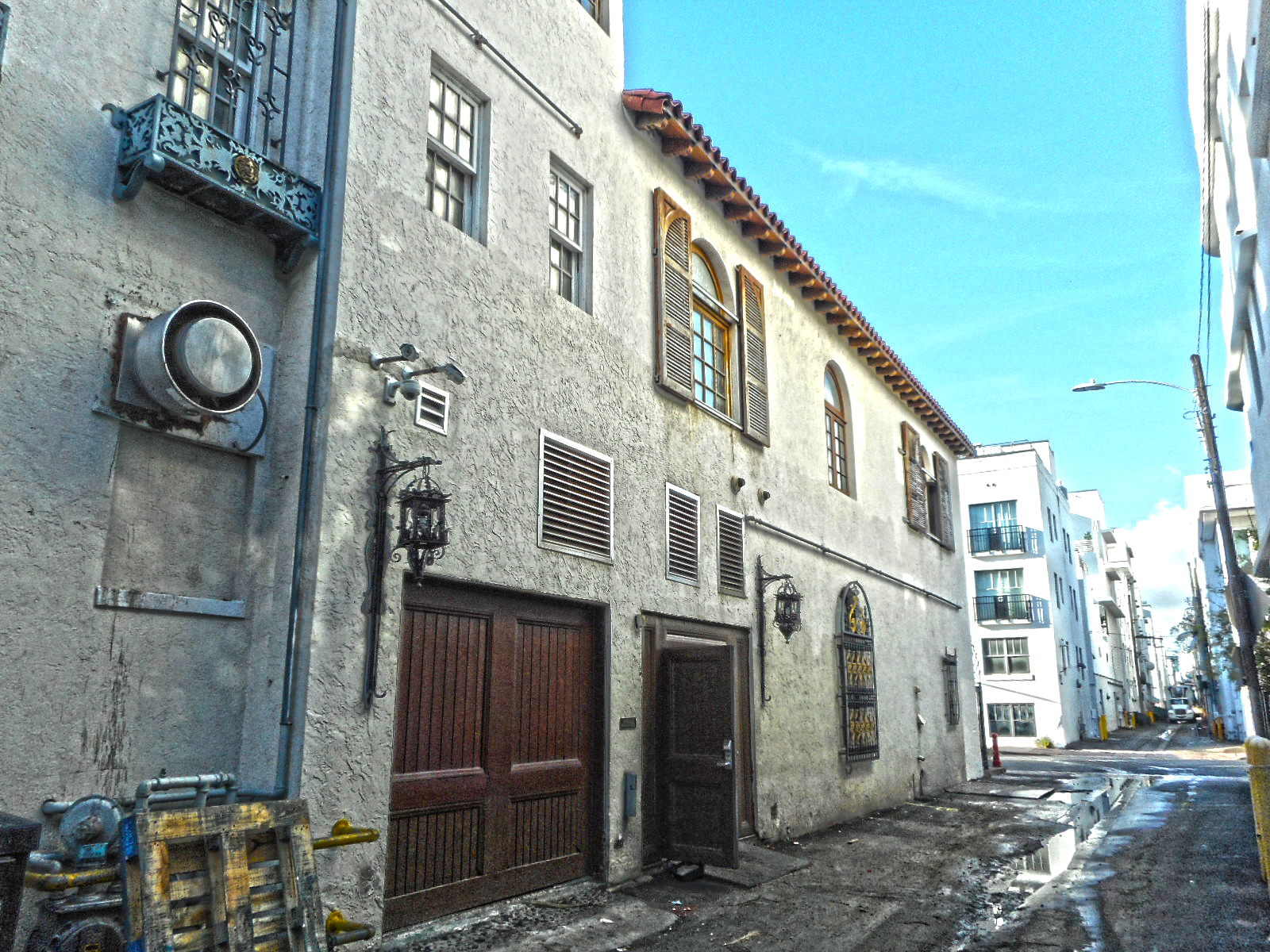
Rear of mansion - alleyway view south
