= The Laskett Gardens =

Garden in Herefordshire, England

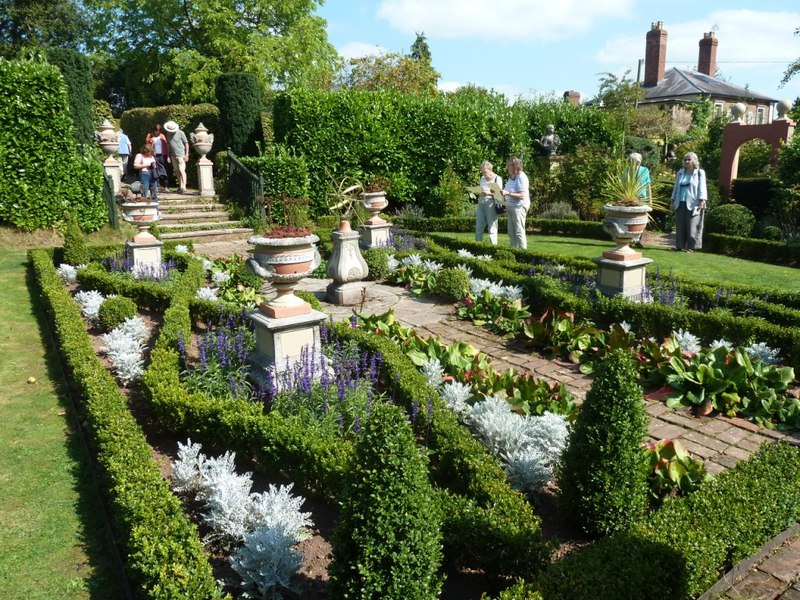
- View across the garden in 2014

- Location within Herefordshire
- 51.96011°N 2.70356°W
- Type: Garden
- Location: Near Much Birch and Llanwarne
- Nearest city: Hereford

History
- Begun: 1974

Site notes
- Owner: Gardeners' Royal Benevolent Society (Perennial)

The Laskett Gardens, near Much Birch, Herefordshire, England, were created by Sir Roy Strong and his wife, Julia, Lady Strong. The couple purchased and moved to the rural property in 1973 and, over the next thirty years, built the garden from scratch.

In 2015 Strong announced that he would bequeath the property to the Gardeners' Royal Benevolent Society, also known as "Perennial". Perennial accepted the gift in 2021.

In early 2026 it was reported that the Gardens would have to close for that year's season as well as suggesting the possibility that they may have to be sold, citing dwindling visitor numbers and lack of adequate visitor amenities. This was later confirmed in March of the same year when it was announced by Perennial that after discussion "the Board has unanimously decided that the only viable option is to explore a potential sale of The Laskett Garden". The property was then listed on the open market through a Hereford estate agent, John Goodwin. As of August 2026 the house and garden remain on the market.

== Artworks ==
Commissioned paintings of The Laskett Gardens were completed by Jonathan Myles-Lea (1995), Richard Shirley Smith (2006) and Paul Brason (2009).

== Sources ==
- Strong, Roy (2003). The Laskett: The Story of a Garden. London: Bantam Press. ISBN 978-0-59305-070-5.
- Strong, Roy (2014). Remaking a Garden: The Laskett Transformed. Frances Lincoln Limited. ISBN 978-0-71123-396-6.
