= Jonathan Myles-Lea =

English painter (1969–2021)

- Born: 23 January 1969; Southport, England
- Died: 25 August 2021 (aged 52); Royal Crescent, Bath, England
- Known for: Painting
- Notable work: Cliveden (1996), Somerleyton Hall (1998), Highgrove (2008), Highgrove - The Sundial Garden (2008)
- Patrons: Sir Roy Strong

Jonathan Myles-Lea (23 January 1969 – 25 August 2021) was an English painter of country houses, historic buildings, and landscapes, typically taking the form of aerial views. Clients have included Charles, Prince of Wales; and the National Trust of Great Britain.

== Life and career ==
Myles-Lea was born in Southport in Lancashire in North West England. Much of his early life was spent in this region of the UK with walks and outdoor activities. He was introduced to the series of walking guides written and illustrated by Alfred Wainwright. The pen and ink drawings included with these guides were an early influence on Myles-Lea's emerging style. He was educated first at Hutton Grammar School and won an arts scholarship to attend Malvern College in Worcestershire from the ages of 15 until 18; he won the painting prizes in 1985 and his senior year, 1986. In 1988 he traveled extensively in Europe making a modern Grand Tour study of art and architecture. He gained an Honours Degree in 'The History of Art & Architecture' from Westfield College, The University of London in 1991.

He worked for three years in arts broadcasting. He held positions as a press and PR officer for arts and entertainment programmes, and a continuity announcer at Channel 4 TV. He also produced and directed an adaptation of Brian Friel's play The Faith Healer. He became a member of The Colony Room, where he was introduced to the renowned Anglo-Irish painter Francis Bacon, who encouraged him to undertake a professional career in painting.

In 1992, Myles-Lea left Channel 4 and went to assist a friend for a year in the restoration of two historic buildings in the British countryside. These were, Bettisfield Park, in Hanmer, Wales, a classical house built in 1760, and Plas Teg a Jacobean mansion in Wales. At Bettisfield, he re-created the original gardens and replanted the parkland using surviving plans from the 18th century. He made his first landscape painting, Plas Teg, Clwyd (1992).

In 1995, Myles-Lea was commissioned to paint an image of The Laskett, a large formal garden created by Sir Roy Strong and Julia Trevelyan Oman. Shortly afterwards Myles-Lea was commissioned by Gervase Jackson-Stops OBE, a senior advisor to The National Trust to produce a plan of Stowe Landscape Gardens (1995). Patronage by The National Trust continued in the mid-1990s with a commission to produce a series of pen and ink sketches of the house and garden features and a landscape plan of the gardens at Cliveden, Taplow, Buckinghamshire.

In 1996, John Harris, writing for Sotheby's, said:

Felix Kelly owes much to Rex Whistler and was the modern master of the country house capriccio... Today Kelly's natural follower seems to be Jonathan Myles-Lea who heightens the projection of his scene with certain mysterious overtones as we can see in Plas Teg, Clwyd (1992) or Trewane Manor, Cornwall (1993).

In 1997 Myles-Lea was included in the feature, "Living National Treasures" by Country Life magazine.

In 2009, Myles-Lea was commissioned to create an oil painting for the cover of Country Life magazine, Dream Acres was the first commissioned painting ever to be featured on the cover of Country Life for the opening issue of their 12-week Dream Acres gardening feature. Country Life publishing director Jean Christie said "This is the first cover of this kind for Country Life in its 112-year history, and the first editorial double gatefold we have produced. This is another example of Country Life breaking with tradition to showcase a magnificent issue."

In July 2009, author and journalist Jonathan Self described Myles-Lea as 'The successor to Stubbs and Constable.

In September 2009, Grosvenor Estates asked Myles-Lea to provide artworks in collaboration with Linley to furnish a recently renovated townhouse in Lower Belgrave Street.

Myles-Lea's main work is his paintings of historic buildings, country houses and their gardens and estates. These are portrayed in a traditional landscape view, and also from an aerial perspective. The landscape paintings are generally in the range of 42" x 30", executed using a miniaturist technique. He has painted portraits of Evelyn H. Lauder, Senior Corporate Vice President, The Estée Lauder Companies Inc, (2004), and Brian Avon, Director of Global Visual Merchandising, Aveda, (2004).

His work has been exhibited at Sotheby's and The British Library in London.

His pictures have been featured in The Artist and the Country House by John Harris, The Artist and the Garden by Sir Roy Strong and The Story of Gardening by Penelope Hobhouse.

A number of his abstract works have also appeared as the artwork on the covers of a series of novellas by the art historian and writer Stephen Little.

He also appeared as a guest of the broadcaster Trevor Barnes in his BBC World Service radio programme about the spiritual significance of garden design A Place in Paradise: Spiritual Gardens.

== Studios ==
Myles-Lea lived and worked in Brussels during 2002. It was during this residency in the Belgian capital that he vigorously promoted his work to mainland European clients building on early successes from commissions such as Kasteel Wylre (commissioned by Marlies & Jo Eyck, 1999). Myles-Lea lived and worked in New York during 2003/4. It was during this period in New York that he continued to develop his painting of abstract pictures building on the influences he had experienced whilst living in Brussels. Myles-Lea occupied a studio in Belsize Park, Hampstead from 2004 to 2006. The house had previously been the wartime home of the artists Ben Nicholson and Barbara Hepworth. Relocating from Hampstead in the latter part of 2006, Myles-Lea took an apartment in Wyndham Place, Marylebone, which was his principal residence and studio until October 2011. Subsequently, his principal residence and studio was at The Folly, within the grounds of Sir Roy Strong's Laskett Garden at Much Birch in Herefordshire. Myles-Lea moved to Royal Crescent, Bath in 2020, where he continued to work despite a terminal cancer diagnosis. He spent some time at Dorothy House hospice before returning to his home in Bath where he died on 25 August 2021.

== Exhibitions ==
The following exhibitions have featured work by Jonathan Myles-Lea

- The Artist and the Country House - from the Fifteenth Century to the Present Day Sotheby's, London (1996) .
- Painting the West Country House and Garden The Holburne Museum, Bath (2006).
- The Artist in the Garden The British Library, London (2007).

== Works ==
Selected paintings

- The Laskett (1995) (commissioned by Sir Roy Strong)
- Burghley House (1996) (commissioned by Simon and Lady Victoria Leatham)
- Cliveden (1996) (A series of garden drawings commissioned by The National Trust (of Great Britain))
- Througham Court (1997) (commissioned by Dr Christine Facer)
- Hanbury Hall (1997) (commissioned by The National Trust (of Great Britain))
- Gresgarth Hall (1998) (commissioned by Sir Mark and Lady Arabella Lennox-Boyd)
- Maybanks Manor (2001) (commissioned by Mr & Mrs Beckwith-Smith)
- Wartnaby House (2001) (commissioned by Lord and Lady King)
- Ein Englischer Garten in Koln (2002) (commissioned by Udo & Kirsten Lammerting)
- The Manor House, Chipperfield (2005) (commissioned by Rory Tapner, Director UBS Warburg)
- The Manor House, Upton Grey (2006) (commissioned by Rosamund Wallinger)
- Highgrove House and Gardens (2008) (commissioned by the Prince of Wales)
- Highgrove - The Sundial Garden (2008) (commissioned by Lady Isabel King)
- Maze with Folly Behind (2008) (Painted for Gensler Can Change Charity Auction for Cancer Research UK)
- Waddeton Court (2009) (commissioned by Mr & Mrs Andrew Brownsword)
- Domaine de Boyéres, Provence (commissioned by Viscount Linley for Princess Salimah Aga Khan)
