= Versace (disambiguation) =

Versace is an Italian fashion label.

Versace may also refer to:

== People ==
=== Versace family ===
- Gianni Versace (1946–1997), Italian fashion designer, founder of Gianni Versace S.p.A.
- Donatella Versace (born 1955), Italian fashion designer, sister of Gianni
- Santo Versace (born 1944), president of Gianni Versace SpA, brother of Gianni
- Allegra Versace (born 1986), Italian heiress and socialite, daughter of Donatella Versace

=== Others ===
- Ariel Versace (born 1992), American drag queen
- Dick Versace (1940–2022), American basketball coach and executive
- Humbert Roque Versace (1937-1965), US Army captain, Medal of Honor recipient and POW during Vietnam War
- Massimiliano Versace (born 1972), Italian computer scientist

== Other ==
- Palazzo Versace Australia, a luxury hotel located on the Gold Coast, Queensland, Australia
- Palazzo Versace Dubai, a luxury hotel and resort under construction in Dubai, United Arab Emirates
- "Versace" (song), performed by Migos
