= Antonio D'Amico =

Italian fashion designer and model (1959–2022)

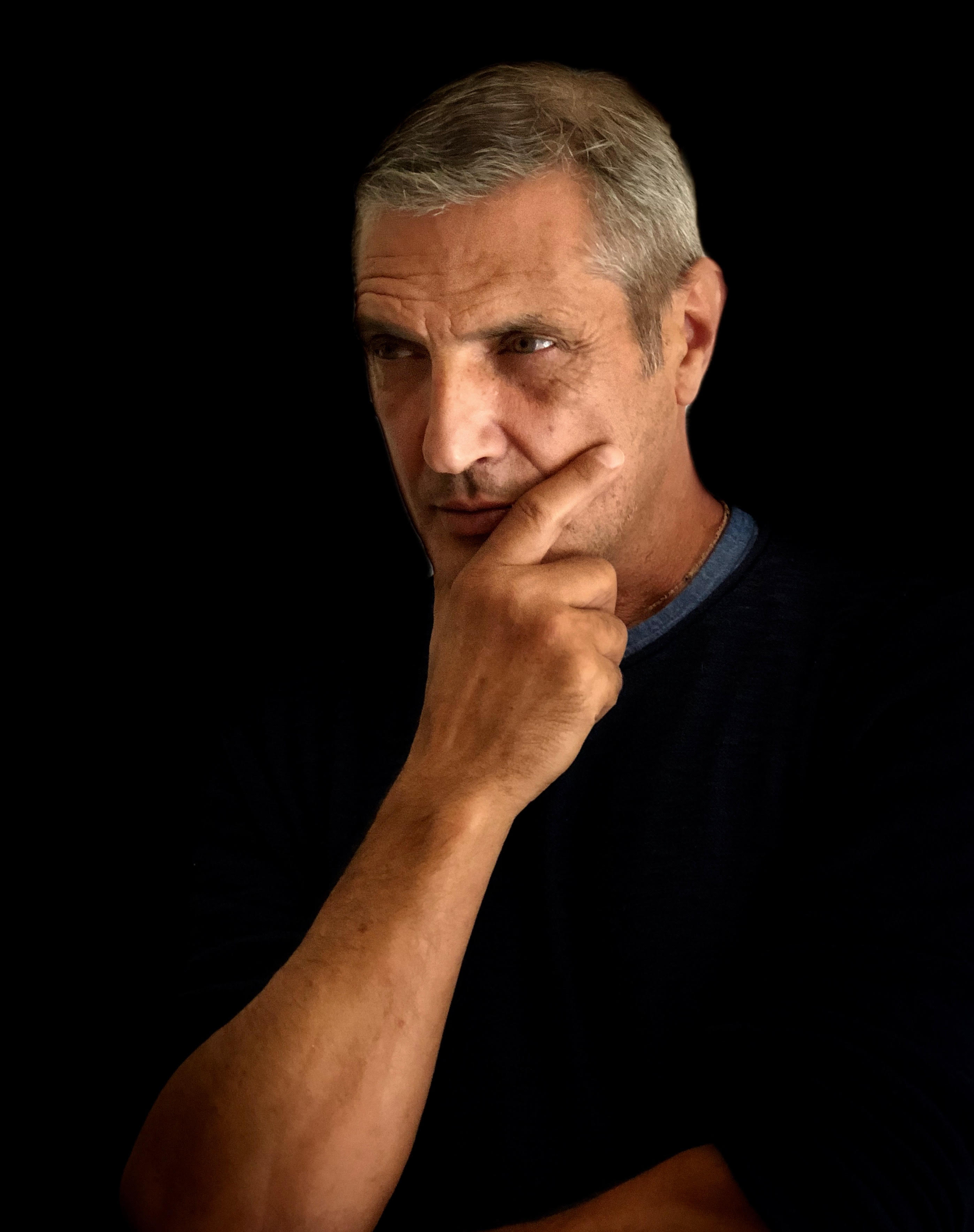
- Born: 20 January 1959; Mesagne, Brindisi, Italy
- Died: 6 December 2022 (aged 63); Manerba del Garda, Brescia, Italy
- Occupation: Fashion designer
- Partner: Gianni Versace (1982–1997; his death)

Antonio D'Amico (20 January 1959 – 6 December 2022) was an Italian fashion designer and model.

== Biography ==
D'Amico was born in Mesagne, in the Italian province of Brindisi, and later lived in Milan. He was hired as a part-time office administrator for his first job. He met Gianni Versace in 1982, and the couple eventually embarked on a long-term relationship that lasted 15 years, until Versace's murder in 1997. During that time, he worked as designer for the Versace Sport line. D'Amico later ran his own fashion design company.

Versace's will left D'Amico with a pension of 50 million lira a month for life, and the right to live in any of Versace's homes in Italy and the United States. However, since the properties that were left to D'Amico in Gianni's will actually belonged to the company, the homes belonged to Versace's sister Donatella, brother Santo, and his niece, Allegra after his death. After working out agreements with lawyers, D'Amico obtained a fraction of the pension and a restricted right to live in Gianni's properties. D'Amico's relations with the rest of the Versace family were not always easy; Donatella said in March 1999, "My relationship with Antonio is exactly as it was when Gianni was alive. I respected him as the boyfriend of my brother, but I never liked him as a person. So the relationship stayed the same."

D'Amico died on 6 December 2022, at the age of 63.

== In popular culture ==
D'Amico was portrayed by Oscar Torre in the film The Versace Murder (1998), by Stefano DiMatteo in the film House of Versace (2013), and Ricky Martin in the miniseries The Assassination of Gianni Versace: American Crime Story (2018). Martin was nominated for a Primetime Emmy Award for Outstanding Supporting Actor in a Limited Series or Movie for his performance.
