= House of Versace =

2013 film by Sara Sugarman

- Promotional poster
- Genre: Drama; Biographical
- Based on: House of Versace: The Untold Story of Genius, Murder, and Survival by Deborah Ball
- Screenplay by: Rama Stagner
- Directed by: Sara Sugarman
- Starring: Gina Gershon; Enrico Colantoni; Colm Feore; Donna Murphy; Raquel Welch
- Composer: Michel Corriveau
- Country of origin: Canada
- Original language: English

Production
- Producers: Ric Nish; Sharon Bordas
- Cinematography: John Dyer
- Editor: Jean Beaudoin
- Running time: 85 minutes
- Production companies: MarVista Entertainment; 20th Century Fox Television

Original release
- Network: Lifetime
- Release: October 5, 2013

House of Versace is a 2013 Canadian biographical drama television film directed by Sara Sugarman and starring Gina Gershon. Based on the 2010 biography House of Versace: The Untold Story of Genius, Murder, and Survival by Deborah Ball, it depicts real-life events of the Versace family, and particularly designer Donatella Versace inheriting the Versace fashion house following the murder of her brother Gianni.

The film premiered on Lifetime on October 5, 2013 and received 1.975 million viewers. The film was released on DVD in 2014 and has grossed $233,729 from its sales.

== Plot ==
The film is about Italian fashion designer and company founder Gianni Versace. When Gianni is shot dead in front of his villa "Casa Casuarina" in Miami at the age of 50, his two siblings, Donatella and Santo, have to take over the management of the company. Donatella has been using drugs since then and is about to go bankrupt. With the help of her relatives, she is transferred to a rehabilitation center and comes back clean and healthy again. It leads the company to one of the most influential fashion brands in the world.

== Cast ==
- Gina Gershon as Donatella Versace
- Enrico Colantoni as Gianni Versace
- Colm Feore as Santo Versace
- Donna Murphy as Mari
- Alex Carter as Paul Beck
- Samantha Hodhod as Allegra Versace
- Stefano DiMatteo as Antonio D'Amico
- Yan England as Michael
- Raquel Welch as Aunt Lucia
- Trevor Momesso as Daniel Versace
- Mylène Dinh-Robic as Amanda
- Jayne Heitmeyer as Lauren
- Luke Morrison as Andrew Cunanan
