= The Assassination of Gianni Versace: American Crime Story =

Season 2 of "American Crime Story"

- Promotional poster
- Starring: Édgar Ramírez; Darren Criss; Ricky Martin; Penélope Cruz
- No. of episodes: 9

Release
- Original network: FX
- Original release: January 17 – March 21, 2018

Season chronology
- ← Previous; The People v. O. J. Simpson Next → Impeachment

The second season of American Crime Story, titled The Assassination of Gianni Versace, examines the July 1997 murder of legendary fashion designer Gianni Versace by sociopathic serial killer Andrew Cunanan. It is based on Maureen Orth's book Vulgar Favors: Andrew Cunanan, Gianni Versace, and the Largest Failed Manhunt in U.S. History, and was developed by Tom Rob Smith, after the departure of series creators Scott Alexander and Larry Karaszewski.

Cable network FX confirmed in October 2016 a season about Versace's murder, which would be the series' third, following an installment about Hurricane Katrina. The story about Katrina was eventually cancelled and The Assassination of Gianni Versace took over as second season, with filming taking place from May to November 2017. Comprising nine episodes, it was broadcast between January 17 and March 21, 2018. The ensemble cast includes Édgar Ramírez, Darren Criss, Ricky Martin, and Penélope Cruz.

The Assassination of Gianni Versace received positive reviews from critics, with praise for most of the performances (particularly from Criss). Among its awards, the season won the GLAAD Media Award for Outstanding TV Movie or Limited Series, due to its treatment of LGBT characters and themes. It also won seven Emmy Awards, two Golden Globe Awards, three Satellite Awards, and two Critics' Choice Television Awards. Criss won six out of nine nominations for his performance in the season.

== Cast ==
=== Main ===
- Édgar Ramírez as Gianni Versace
- Darren Criss as Andrew Cunanan
- Ricky Martin as Antonio D'Amico
- Penélope Cruz as Donatella Versace

=== Special guest stars ===
- Judith Light as Marilyn Miglin
- Aimee Mann as Bar Singer
- Finn Wittrock as Jeffrey "Jeff" Trail

=== Recurring ===
- Joanna P. Adler as Mary Ann Cunanan
- Joe Adler as Jerome Gentes
- Annaleigh Ashford as Elizabeth Cote
- Jon Jon Briones as Modesto Cunanan
- Will Chase as Det. Paul Scrimshaw
- Giovanni Cirfiera as Santo Versace
- Mike Farrell as Lee Miglin
- Jay R. Ferguson as Agent Keith Evans
- Cody Fern as David Madson
- Max Greenfield as Ronnie Holston
- Sophie von Haselberg as Linda Elwell
- Edouard Holdener as Young Andrew Cunanan
- Christine Horn as Agent Talarah Gruber
- John Lacy as Howard Madson
- Cathy Moriarty as Vivian Oliva
- Michael Nouri as Norman Blachford
- Dascha Polanco as Det. Lori Wieder
- Terry Sweeney as David Gallo
- José Zúñiga as Det. George Navarro

=== Guest ===
- Maralyn Facey as Lake Como Housekeeper
- Razaaq Adoti as Det. Pete Jackson
- Vincenzo Amato as Versace Spokesman
- Jack Armstrong as J. Paul Beitler
- Cullen Douglas as Agent Reynolds
- Nico Evers-Swindell as Philip Merrill
- Alex Fernandez as Supt. Matt L. Rodriguez
- Jacob Fortner as Duke Miglin
- Molly Price as Escort Agency Manager
- Paul Schneider as Paul Beck
- Tara Summers as Laura Trail
- Todd Waring as Lincoln Aston
- Michael Shamus Wiles as Det. Robert Tichich
- Gregg Lawrence as William Reese

== Episodes ==
| No. overall | No. in season | Title | Directed by | Written by | Original release date | Prod. code | US viewers (millions) |
|---|---|---|---|---|---|---|---|
| 11 | 1 | "The Man Who Would Be Vogue" | Ryan Murphy | Tom Rob Smith | January 17, 2018 (Note: This episode was available five days before the official premiere for FX+ subscribers.) | 3WAX01 | 2.22 |
On the morning of July 15, 1997, fashion designer Gianni Versace is shot and killed outside his Miami Beach mansion by Andrew Cunanan. Seven years earlier in 1990, Cunanan meets Versace at a gay nightclub in San Francisco and tells his roommates about the encounter the following day, albeit with most of the details either embellished or fabricated. Cunanan later attends a performance of Capriccio as Versace's guest and exchanges origin stories with him after the performance. In the present, Cunanan flees the scene, evading one of Versace's associates. Versace, meanwhile, is rushed to the hospital and pronounced dead. As police collaborate with federal authorities, Versace's sister, Donatella, and brother, Santo, plan the future of their brother's business empire while Cunanan purchases newspapers covering Versace's murder with a remorseless expression.
| 12 | 2 | "Manhunt" | Nelson Cragg | Tom Rob Smith | January 24, 2018 | 3WAX02 | 1.42 |
In March 1994, Versace is diagnosed with ear cancer. Three years later, Cunanan arrives in Miami after fleeing from South Carolina and moves into a motel under an assumed identity. He juggles working as a prostitute, giving his earnings to his gay neighbor Ronnie, and feeding his obsession with Versace. Versace, meanwhile, juggles dealing with creative block and reeling from Antonio's proposal of a wedding. While at a nightclub one evening, Cunanan surprises Versace and Antonio and attempts to follow them only to lose them in the crowd.
| 13 | 3 | "A Random Killing" | Gwyneth Horder-Payton | Tom Rob Smith | January 31, 2018 | 3WAX03 | 1.26 |
In May 1997, Chicago real estate developer Lee Miglin is found dead in his garage. One week earlier, Miglin invites Cunanan, whom he knows as a gay escort, over to his house after his wife Marilyn leaves Chicago to promote her perfume brand. Cunanan proceeds to brutally torture and kill Miglin before stealing his Lexus. In the present, detectives assigned to the case discover gay pornographic magazines surrounding Miglin's dead body. Marilyn insists that the killer owns the magazines and that her husband's murder was nothing more than a random killing. The authorities later use the car's phone in an attempt to track Cunanan, who learns about their plan after it is leaked to the media. He then abandons Miglin's Lexus in Pennsville, New Jersey before gunning down caretaker William Reese and stealing his red pick-up truck. Marilyn, meanwhile, deals with her grief as she continues to promote her perfume.
| 14 | 4 | "House by the Lake" | Daniel Minahan | Tom Rob Smith | February 7, 2018 | 3WAX04 | 0.98 |
In April 1997, Cunanan lures former acquaintance Jeff Trail to the Minneapolis loft-apartment of his former lover, David Madson, and bludgeons him to death with a claw hammer. After forcing Madson to remain complicit, Cunanan decides to flee to Mexico, forcing Madson to accompany him. One of Madson's co-workers calls at Madson's apartment when he fails to show up for work and then calls the police. The Minneapolis Police Department discovers Trail's corpse and suspect Madson to be the killer. They question Madson's parents, who firmly believe that their son is innocent. When Madson confronts Cunanan about his lies, Cunanan realizes that he has lost his hold on his lover and shoots Madson near a lake outside Rush City.
| 15 | 5 | "Don't Ask Don't Tell" | Daniel Minahan | Tom Rob Smith | February 14, 2018 | 3WAX05 | 0.91 |
In June 1995, Versace ignores Donatella's disapproval and makes his sexuality public in an interview. In November 1995, U.S. Navy lieutenant Jeff Trail is suspected to be gay after saving a fellow veteran from being assaulted in San Diego. Following a suicide attempt, Trail goes to a gay bar and meets Cunanan. Trail later agrees to do an interview about homophobia in the military, during which he "makes the decision" to leave the Navy. Two years later, Cunanan runs into Trail and Madson in Minneapolis. Both men, however, try to avoid him, with Trail staying at his sister's house and Madson stating he has moved on. Abandoned and angry, Cunanan resolves to murder Trail.
| 16 | 6 | "Descent" | Gwyneth Horder-Payton | Tom Rob Smith | February 28, 2018 | 3WAX07 | 1.10 |
In 1996, Cunanan lives in La Jolla, California with middle-aged businessman Norman Blachford, who handles his finances as part of their arranged relationship. During his twenty-seventh birthday party, Cunanan tries to impress Madson by fabricating details about his life and boasting that everyone loves him. After making more extravagant demands results in Blachford asking him to leave, Cunanan spends thousands of dollars in an attempt to win Madson over, only for Madson to cut all ties with him. Cunanan then outs Trail to his father in a postcard, causing Trail to threaten him before moving to Minneapolis. Following a severe, drug-fueled bout of depression, Cunanan reunites with his mother Mary Ann and tells her he is going to Minneapolis.
| 17 | 7 | "Ascent" | Gwyneth Horder-Payton | Tom Rob Smith | March 7, 2018 | 3WAX06 | 0.92 |
In 1992, Versace pressures Donatella into taking over the company after his death. Following a failed attempt to collaborate on a dress for the Vogue anniversary gala, Versace is diagnosed with ear cancer and travels to Miami to recover, forcing Donatella to take the reins. That same year, Cunanan, who is living with Mary Ann, starts working as a gay escort for older men. He develops a relationship with architect Lincoln Aston, a close friend of Norman Blachford, only for Aston to break up with him after discovering he and Madson spent the night together. Cunanan's attempt to reconcile with Aston ends with him witnessing Aston's brutal murder. Cunanan then moves out of his mother's apartment following an argument and uses Aston's death to develop a relationship with Blachford, who lets him move into his house.
| 18 | 8 | "Creator / Destroyer" | Matt Bomer | Tom Rob Smith and Maggie Cohn | March 14, 2018 | 3WAX08 | 1.00 |
In 1957 Italy, a young Versace starts designing clothes under tutelage from his dressmaker mother. In 1980, a young Cunanan receives preferential treatment from his stockbroker father Modesto as a result of having to care more for him following Mary Ann's postpartum depression, resulting in him abusing her and neglecting his siblings. Seven years later, Cunanan juggles attending private school at The Bishop's School and secretly dating older men. Modesto, meanwhile, flees to Manila after being fired for embezzling from elderly clients and learning that he is wanted by the FBI, leaving his family penniless. Cunanan tracks him down and confronts him over the charges only to be rejected. Upon returning to the United States, Cunanan applies for a job at a pharmacy, where he tells the manager that Modesto owns pineapple plantations.
| 19 | 9 | "Alone" | Daniel Minahan | Tom Rob Smith | March 21, 2018 | 3WAX09 | 1.20 |
On the evening of July 15, 1997, Cunanan hides in a Miami Beach houseboat in an attempt to evade both local and federal authorities. Over the course of the next two days, Cunanan attempts to leave the island city only to continue hiding due to the strong police presence. As the authorities interrogate Mary Ann and Ronnie, Marilyn grapples with the fact that he has gone unpunished. At the same time, Cunanan's friend Elizabeth Cote appeals to him in a television interview, Madson's father insists his son is a victim, and Modesto uses Cunanan's story in an attempt to get attention after Cunanan calls him in a plea for help. On July 22, 1997, as Versace is buried in his family vault near Lake Como, Italy, Donatella tells Antonio he cannot stay in the house. The next morning, the authorities corner Cunanan, and he shoots himself in the mouth. Cunanan is later buried in a public mausoleum while Donatella prepares to meet with Versace's lawyers and Antonio attempts suicide.

== Production ==
=== Development ===
The Assassination of Gianni Versace: American Crime Story was picked up on October 18, 2016, and was announced as the third season of the series, following the season about Katrina. The announcement also revealed that English author Tom Rob Smith would be the writer of multiple episodes of the season, including the first two, while executive producer Ryan Murphy would be directing the season premiere. Following the airing of the first season's finale in April 2016, it was revealed that series creators Scott Alexander and Larry Karaszewski would not be returning for the second season.

In June 2017, it was announced that Katrina would not begin production until early 2018 and that Versace would air in early 2018, replacing Katrina as the show's official second installment.

On October 2, 2017, American Horror Story actor Matt Bomer was announced as the director of the eighth episode, making it his directorial debut. During its production, the working title of the season was American Crime Story: Versace/Cunanan.

In December 2017, after the first public screening, it was revealed that Versace would have nine episodes, despite being originally reported to consist of ten episodes.

=== Casting ===
In February 2017, Édgar Ramírez and Darren Criss joined the cast of The Assassination of Gianni Versace as Gianni Versace and Andrew Cunanan, respectively. Murphy confirmed the reports announcing Lady Gaga would portray Donatella Versace in The Assassination of Gianni Versace were false; Penélope Cruz was later cast in the role. In April 2017, it was announced that Ricky Martin was joining the cast of The Assassination of Gianni Versace as Antonio D'Amico, Versace's longtime partner. On April 28, 2017, Annaleigh Ashford was seen filming on the set of The Assassination of Gianni Versace with Criss. On June 21, 2017, it was announced through Entertainment Weekly that Ashford's role in the series would be as Elizabeth Cote, a friend of Cunanan's since high school, while Nico Evers-Swindell would play her husband, Philip Merrill.

On May 5, 2017, Murphy announced via his Instagram account that Max Greenfield joined the casting, by publishing a photo of Greenfield and Criss on the set. On June 21, 2017, it was announced that Finn Wittrock will star in The Assassination of Gianni Versace, playing Jeffrey Trail, Cunanan's first victim.

In November 2017, the official Twitter account for the series revealed that Judith Light and Dascha Polanco are part of the cast. In December 2017, the official webpage for the series released cast and character bios revealing that Max Greenfield would play Ronnie, whilst confirming the casting of Judith Light as Marilyn Miglin, Dascha Polanco as Detective Lori Wieder, Jon Jon Briones as Modesto Cunanan, Cody Fern as David Madson, and Mike Farrell as Lee Miglin.

=== Filming ===
According to multiple set reports and photos, principal photography of season 2 took place at the beginning of May 2017, in Miami and Reggio Calabria. As revealed by Darren Criss via his Twitter account, shooting ended during the week of November 13.

== Promotion ==
In September 2017, FX released the first promotional teaser for The Assassination of Gianni Versace, showing doves sitting outside Versace's former mansion and flying away when two gunshots ring out. A second teaser was released that same month, depicting Versace's sister Donatella placing flowers on a casket. In October, a third teaser was released, depicting some police radio communications as a black clothes cover, with the name Versace on it, is being closed. The same month, a fourth teaser was released, showing Donatella kissing the stairs where Gianni was murdered, before entering in his mansion. On Halloween day, FX aired a new promotional video during a commercial break of the ninth episode of American Horror Story: Cult, which announced that the season would premiere on January 17, 2018.

In November 2017, four new teasers were released. The first showed Versace relaxing next to his pool, as Cunanan comes out of it. The second depicts D'Amico leaving Gianni's house, as he hears two gunshots (the unseen murder) and runs to see what happened; while a voice-over by Ricky Martin as D'Amico says that he was Gianni's partner and lover. The third shows Donatella and Gianni hugging and watching themselves in front of a mirror, as the latter tells his sister that she would be Versace without him. The fourth depicts a running sewing machine, which ends up having some issues and not being able to finish its work.

On November 15, 2017, the first full trailer for the season was released via the Twitter account of the series. It shows moments from Cunanan's unstable past and the first aftermaths of Versace's murder. The same day, it was announced that the first episode of the season would be available five days before the official premiere for FX+ subscribers. On November 28, 2017, FX released a new short trailer depicting the main cast of the season: Cruz, Ramírez, Martin and Criss; while a voice-over by Criss as Cunanan reveals how he feels the same as Versace.

In December 2017, more teasers were released. The first opposed Versace and Cunanan as they speak about themselves and their pasts. The second featured a Versace fashion show where models start crying, as news reports about the designer's death are heard. The third showed Cunanan trying to convince someone that he really has a date with Versace, while the scene is being cut by shots of the murder and its aftermaths. The fourth one features Donatella Versace in a black dress for her brother's funeral; the fifth showed different rooms of Versace's mansion, with multiple voice-overs by different characters; and the sixth featured a showering Cunanan, surrounding his face with duct tape, as Max Greenfield's Ronnie asks him what he is doing. On December 28, a first look at the series was released, with interviews from the crew and the cast. That same day, a new teaser was also released, depicting Criss-as-Cunanan about to kill his sexual partner and then Versace.

At the start of January 2018, a new teaser was released. It featured Criss-as-Cunanan changing the license plate of his car and greeting a young girl, while a voice-over is saying that the police are looking for him and that he is very dangerous. On January 16, 2018, the full red band trailer was released, and a short version premiered the next day.

== Reception ==
=== Reviews ===
The second season of American Crime Story received generally positive reviews from critics. The review aggregator Rotten Tomatoes gave the season an approval rating of 88% based on 98 reviews, with an average rating of 7.20/10. The site's critical consensus reads, "The Assassination of Versace starts with a bang and unfurls slowly, moving backward through an intricate (and occasionally convoluted) murder mystery anchored by a career-defining performance from Darren Criss." On Metacritic, the season has a score of 74 out of 100, based on 35 critics, indicating "generally favorable" reviews.

=== Reaction from individuals involved ===
In January 2018, the Versace family released a statement criticizing the series. They explained they have "neither authorized nor had any involvement whatsoever" in the production of the season, before adding that it "should only be considered as a work of fiction." Executive producer Ryan Murphy answered that the series was "not a work of fiction" as it is based on a non-fiction book, Maureen Orth's Vulgar Favors, and that the production team and FX stand by the author and her work. Comparing it to The People v. O. J. Simpson, Murphy added that the season is "a work of non-fiction obviously with docudrama elements," and not a documentary. Following this answer, the Versace family released a second statement, still slamming the series as "a work of fiction" because "the Orth book itself is full of gossip and speculation." They also heavily criticized Orth's work, calling it an "effort to create a sensational story" with "second-hand hearsay that is full of contradictions." They gave the example of Gianni Versace's medical condition, as Orth claims that Versace was HIV positive at the time of his death.

Antonio D'Amico also criticized the series, deeming some scenes as "ridiculous" and insisting that "so much has been fictionalized". He also revealed that he does not plan to watch it, but that he would have been happy if Ricky Martin, who plays his role, got in contact to get some insight into his relationship with Versace.

According to Ryan Murphy, Donatella Versace was very supportive that Penélope Cruz played her role. As Cruz and Versace are friends, Murphy explained that, when he offered her the role, Cruz asked the permission of Versace before agreeing to do it. He also revealed that, while Cruz was representing the series at the 75th Golden Globe Awards, Versace "very graciously sent [her] a lovely and huge flower arrangement saying 'good luck.'"

=== Ratings ===
Viewership and ratings per episode of The Assassination of Gianni Versace: American Crime Story
| No. | Title | Air date | Rating/share (18–49) | Viewers (millions) | DVR (18–49) | DVR viewers (millions) | Total (18–49) | Total viewers (millions) |
|---|---|---|---|---|---|---|---|---|
| 1 | "The Man Who Would Be Vogue" | January 17, 2018 | 0.7 | 2.22 | 0.6 | 1.76 | 1.3 | 3.98 |
| 2 | "Manhunt" | January 24, 2018 | 0.4 | 1.42 | 0.7 | 1.98 | 1.1 | 3.40 |
| 3 | "A Random Killing" | January 31, 2018 | 0.4 | 1.26 | 0.7 | 1.94 | 1.1 | 3.20 |
| 4 | "House by the Lake" | February 7, 2018 | 0.3 | 0.98 | 0.6 | 1.79 | 0.9 | 2.77 |
| 5 | "Don't Ask Don't Tell" | February 14, 2018 | 0.2 | 0.91 | TBD | TBD | TBD | TBD |
| 6 | "Descent" | February 28, 2018 | 0.3 | 1.10 | 0.6 | 1.58 | 0.9 | 2.68 |
| 7 | "Ascent" | March 7, 2018 | 0.3 | 0.92 | 0.5 | 1.55 | 0.8 | 2.47 |
| 8 | "Creator / Destroyer" | March 14, 2018 | 0.3 | 1.00 | 0.5 | 1.57 | 0.8 | 2.57 |
| 9 | "Alone" | March 21, 2018 | 0.3 | 1.20 | 0.6 | 1.62 | 0.9 | 2.82 |

== Accolades ==
| Year | Association | Category | Nominated artist/work | Result | Ref |
|---|---|---|---|---|---|
| 2018 | MTV Movie & TV Awards | Best Performance in a Show | Darren Criss | Nominated | |
| 2018 | People's Choice Awards | The Drama TV Star of 2018 | Darren Criss | Nominated | |
| 2018 | People's Choice Awards | The Bingeworthy Show of 2018 | The Assassination of Gianni Versace: American Crime Story | Nominated | |
| 2018 | Primetime Emmy Awards | Outstanding Limited or Anthology Series | The Assassination of Gianni Versace: American Crime Story | Won | |
| 2018 | Primetime Emmy Awards | Outstanding Lead Actor in a Limited Series or Movie | Darren Criss | Won | |
| 2018 | Primetime Emmy Awards | Outstanding Supporting Actor in a Limited Series or Movie | Ricky Martin (For "The Man Who Would Be Vogue") | Nominated | |
| 2018 | Primetime Emmy Awards | Outstanding Supporting Actor in a Limited Series or Movie | Édgar Ramírez (For "Ascent") | Nominated | |
| 2018 | Primetime Emmy Awards | Outstanding Supporting Actor in a Limited Series or Movie | Finn Wittrock (For "Don't Ask, Don't Tell") | Nominated | |
| 2018 | Primetime Emmy Awards | Outstanding Supporting Actress in a Limited Series or Movie | Penélope Cruz (For "Ascent") | Nominated | |
| 2018 | Primetime Emmy Awards | Outstanding Supporting Actress in a Limited Series or Movie | Judith Light (For "A Random Killing") | Nominated | |
| 2018 | Primetime Emmy Awards | Outstanding Directing for a Limited Series or Movie | Ryan Murphy (for "The Man Who Would Be Vogue") | Won | |
| 2018 | Primetime Emmy Awards | Outstanding Writing for a Limited Series or Movie | Tom Rob Smith (for "House by the Lake") | Nominated | |
| 2018 | Primetime Creative Arts Emmy Awards | Outstanding Casting for a Limited/ Anthology Series or Movie | Courtney Bright and Nicole Daniels | Won | |
| 2018 | Primetime Creative Arts Emmy Awards | Outstanding Contemporary Costumes | Lou Eyrich, Allison Leach, Rebecca Guzzi and Nora Pedersen (for "The Man Who Would Be Vogue") | Won | |
| 2018 | Primetime Creative Arts Emmy Awards | Outstanding Hairstyling for a Limited Series or Movie | Chris Clark, Natalie Driscoll, Shay Sanford-Fong and Helena Cepeda | Won | |
| 2018 | Primetime Creative Arts Emmy Awards | Outstanding Makeup for a Limited Series or Movie (Non-Prosthetic) | Eryn Krueger Mekash, Robin Beauchesne, Silvina Knight, David Williams, Ana Lozano and Tym Buacharern | Won | |
| 2018 | Primetime Creative Arts Emmy Awards | Outstanding Prosthetic Makeup for a Series, Limited Series, Movie or Special | Eryn Krueger Mekash, Michael Mekash, Silvina Knight, Robin Beauchesne, David LeRoy Anderson and Glen Eisner | Nominated | |
| 2018 | Primetime Creative Arts Emmy Awards | Outstanding Single-Camera Picture Editing for a Limited/ Anthology Series or Movie | Chi-Yoon Chung (for "Manhunt") | Nominated | |
| 2018 | Primetime Creative Arts Emmy Awards | Outstanding Single-Camera Picture Editing for a Limited/ Anthology Series or Movie | Emily Greene (for "Alone") | Nominated | |
| 2018 | Primetime Creative Arts Emmy Awards | Outstanding Single-Camera Picture Editing for a Limited/ Anthology Series or Movie | Shelly Westerman (for "House by the Lake") | Nominated | |
| 2018 | Primetime Creative Arts Emmy Awards | Outstanding Sound Mixing for a Limited/ Anthology Series or Movie | Doug Andham, Joe Earle, John Bauman and Judah Getz (for "The Man Who Would Be Vogue") | Nominated | |
| 2018 | TCA Awards | Outstanding Achievement in Movies, Miniseries and Specials | The Assassination of Gianni Versace: American Crime Story | Won | |
| 2018 | TCA Awards | Individual Achievement in Drama | Darren Criss | Nominated | |
| 2018 | American Film Institute Awards | Top 10 Television Programs | The Assassination of Gianni Versace | Won | |
| 2018 | Gold Derby Awards | Best Miniseries | The Assassination of Gianni Versace | Won | |
| 2018 | Gold Derby Awards | Best Miniseries/TV Movie Actor | Darren Criss | Won | |
| 2018 | Gold Derby Awards | Best Miniseries/TV Movie Supporting Actor | Cody Fern | Won | |
| 2018 | Gold Derby Awards | Best Miniseries/TV Movie Supporting Actor | Édgar Ramírez | Nominated | |
| 2018 | Gold Derby Awards | Best Miniseries/TV Movie Supporting Actor | Finn Wittrock | Nominated | |
| 2018 | Gold Derby Awards | Best Miniseries/TV Movie Supporting Actress | Judith Light | Won | |
| 2018 | Gold Derby Awards | Best Miniseries/TV Movie Supporting Actress | Penélope Cruz | Nominated | |
| 2018 | Gold Derby Awards | Best Ensemble of the Year | The Assassination of Gianni Versace | Nominated | |
| 2019 | Screen Actors Guild Awards | Outstanding Performance by a Male Actor in a Miniseries or Television Movie | Darren Criss | Won | |
| 2019 | Screen Actors Guild Awards | Outstanding Performance by a Female Actor in a Miniseries or Television Movie | Penélope Cruz | Nominated | |
| 2019 | Critics' Choice Awards | Best Movie/ Miniseries | The Assassination of Gianni Versace | Won | |
| 2019 | Critics' Choice Awards | Best Actor in a Movie/Miniseries | Darren Criss | Won | |
| 2019 | Critics' Choice Awards | Best Supporting Actor in a Movie/Miniseries | Finn Wittrock | Nominated | |
| 2019 | Critics' Choice Awards | Best Supporting Actress in a Movie/Miniseries | Penélope Cruz | Nominated | |
| 2019 | Critics' Choice Awards | Best Supporting Actress in a Movie/Miniseries | Judith Light | Nominated | |
| 2019 | Writers Guild of America Awards | Long Form – Adapted | Maggie Cohn and Tom Rob Smith | Won | |
| 2019 | Satellite Awards | Best Miniseries | The Assassination of Gianni Versace | Won | |
| 2019 | Satellite Awards | Best Actor in a Miniseries or TV Film | Darren Criss | Won | |
| 2019 | Satellite Awards | Best Supporting Actor in a Series, Miniseries or TV Film | Édgar Ramírez | Nominated | |
| 2019 | Satellite Awards | Best Supporting Actress in a Series, Miniseries or TV Film | Penélope Cruz | Nominated | |
| 2019 | Satellite Awards | Best Ensemble: Television | The Assassination of Gianni Versace | Won | |
| 2019 | Golden Globe Awards | Best Miniseries or Television Film | The Assassination of Gianni Versace: American Crime Story | Won | |
| 2019 | Golden Globe Awards | Best Actor – Miniseries or Television Film | Darren Criss | Won | |
| 2019 | Golden Globe Awards | Best Supporting Actor – Series, Miniseries or Television Film | Édgar Ramírez | Nominated | |
| 2019 | Golden Globe Awards | Best Supporting Actress – Series, Miniseries or Television Film | Penélope Cruz | Nominated | |
| 2019 | Producers Guild of America Awards | David L. Wolper Award for Outstanding Producer of Limited Series Television | Ryan Murphy, Nina Jacobson, Brad Simpson, Alexis Martin Woodall, Tom Rob Smith, Daniel Minahan, Brad Falchuk, Scott Alexander, Larry Karaszewski, Chip Vucelich, Maggie Cohn, Eric Kovtun, Lou Eyrich, and Eryn Krueger Mekash | Won | |
| 2019 | GLAAD Media Awards | Outstanding TV Movie or Limited Series | The Assassination of Gianni Versace: American Crime Story | Won | |
