= Giovanni Cirfiera =

Italian actor

- Occupation: Actor
- Years active: 2006–present

Giovanni Cirfiera (Italian pronunciation: [dʒoˈvanni tʃirˈfjɛːra]) is an Italian film and television actor. He was born in Casarano, province of Lecce, in the region of Apulia. He is best known for portraying Santo Versace in the miniseries The Assassination of Gianni Versace: American Crime Story (2018).

== Filmography ==
=== Film ===
| Year | Title | Role | Notes |
|---|---|---|---|
| 2006 | Poveri diavoli | El Perro | Short film |
| 2008 | Camille | Bartender | Uncredited |
| 2008 | Selezione | Murdered man | Short film |
| 2008 | I principi di Marte | Oscar | Short film |
| 2009 | It's Complicated | Businessman | Uncredited |
| 2011 | Like Father, Like Son | Vincenzo | Short film |
| 2011 | Ayn Rand & the Prophecy of Atlas Shrugged | Novel character | Documentary film |
| 2012 | My Uncle Rafael | Pietro | |
| 2013 | The Family | BBQ guest | |
| 2013 | Les limites | Andrea | Short film |
| 2017 | Stranger's Relative | Marcelo | |
| 2018 | Mary Magdalene | | |
| 2019 | Ford v Ferrari | Gianni Agnelli | |
| 2020 | Tout nous sourit | | |
| 2020 | L'ultimo paradiso | Brigadier | Pre-production |
| 2020 | Jesus and the Others | Maximus Blandus | Pre-production |

=== Television ===
| Year | Title | Role | Notes |
|---|---|---|---|
| 2010 | Tutti pazzi per amore | Fabio | Episode: "Una carezza in un pugno" |
| 2010 | RIS Delitti Imperfetti | Matteo | Episode: "Effetto Lucifero" |
| 2010 | General Hospital | Reporter | Episode 12120 |
| 2015 | Squadra antimafia – Palermo oggi | Ruotolo | Episode 5 (season 7) |
| 2016 | Le Mari de mon mari | Marcello | Television film |
| 2018 | The Assassination of Gianni Versace: American Crime Story | Santo Versace | 3 episodes |
| 2018 | Queen of the South | Luca | Episode: "La Muerte" |
| 2023 - 2024 | Signora Volpe | Capitano Riva | 6 episodes |
