= Gina Gershon =

American actress and singer (born 1962)

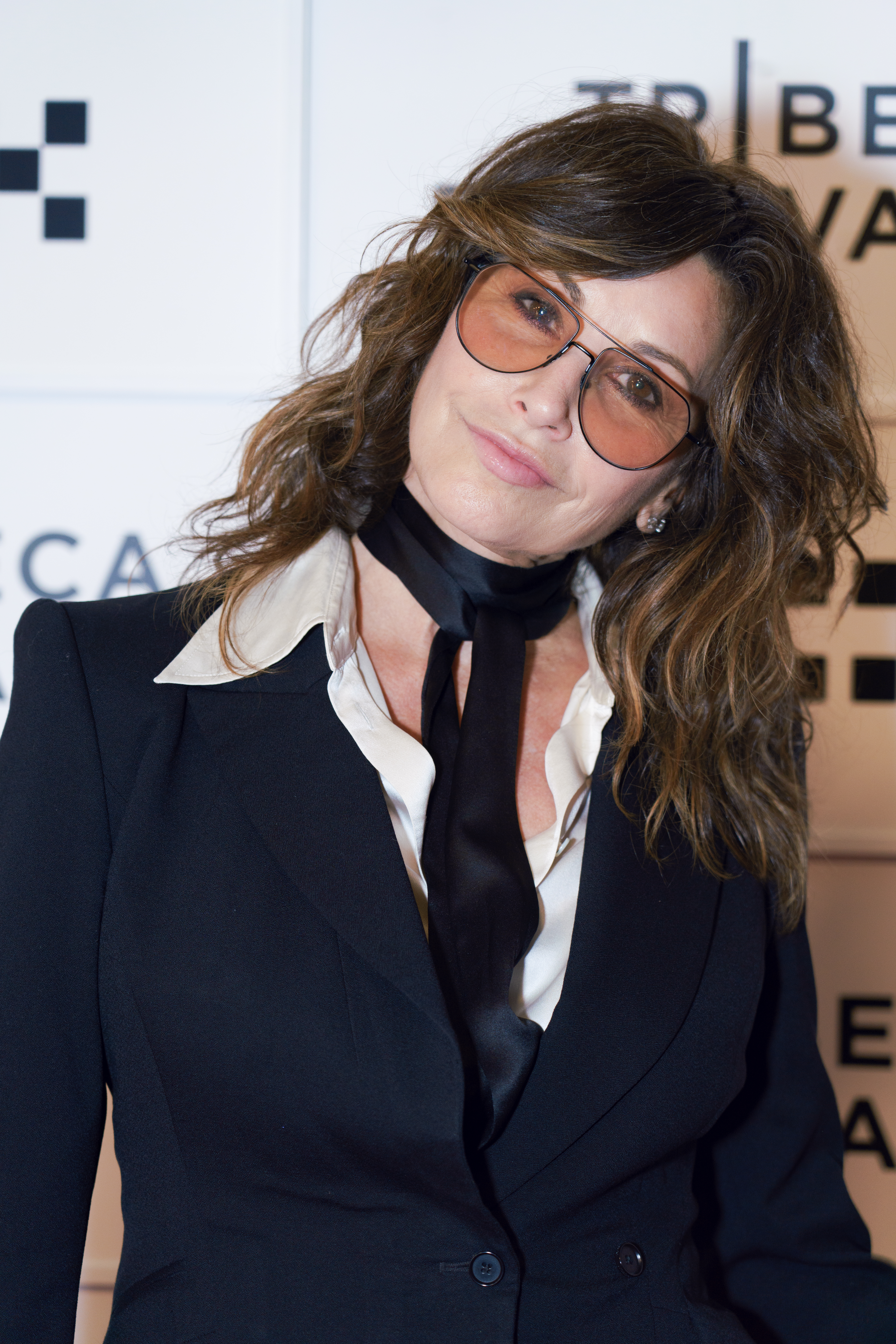
- Gershon in 2026
- Born: Gina L. Gershon; June 10, 1962 (age 64); Los Angeles, California, U.S.
- Education: New York University (BFA)
- Occupations: Actress; singer; author
- Years active: 1981–present
- Relatives: Jack Elliott (uncle)

Gina L. Gershon (/ˈɡɜːrʃɒn/; born June 10, 1962) is an American actress and singer. She has starred in such films as Cocktail (1988), Red Heat (1988), Showgirls (1995), Bound (1996), Face/Off (1997), The Insider (1999), Demonlover (2002), P.S. I Love You (2007), Killer Joe (2011), House of Versace (2013), Blockers (2018), and Emily the Criminal (2022). She has also had recurring television roles in FX's Rescue Me (2007–2009), HBO's How to Make It in America (2011), and The CW teen drama series Riverdale (2018–2019).

== Early life ==
Gina L. Gershon was born in Los Angeles, to Mickey Gershon Koppel, an interior decorator, and Stan Gershon, who worked in the import-export business and sales. She was raised in a Jewish family in Los Angeles's San Fernando Valley. She has an older brother and sister.

Gershon went to Collier Street Elementary School and Woodland Hills Academy (formerly Parkman Junior High). She attended Beverly Hills High School and started acting at the age of 14. After graduating from high school in 1980, she moved to Boston to attend Emerson College. She transferred to New York University and graduated with a BFA in drama and psychology/philosophy in 1983.

She has said she always wanted to be an actress, but her career began in music and dance.

== Career ==
=== Theatre ===
Gershon attended the Circle in the Square Professional Theater School in New York, working first with David Mamet and later with Harold Guskin and Sandra Seacat, whom she has described in interviews as "a huge influence." Her first professional acting was in stage productions of Camille and The Substance of Fire.

She is one of the founding members of the New York-based theater group Naked Angels.

She has appeared on Broadway three times: as Sally Bowles in the revival of Cabaret; in the revival of the sex farce Boeing-Boeing; and as Rosie Alvarez in the 2010 revival of Bye Bye Birdie at the Roundabout Theatre Company.

=== Film ===
Gershon's break came with a bit part in Pretty in Pink (1986), which led to more substantial roles in Sweet Revenge with Nancy Allen, Cocktail with Tom Cruise and Elisabeth Shue, and John Sayles' urban drama City of Hope (1991). Also in 1991, she appeared in the action film Out for Justice opposite Steven Seagal, where she played Patti Madano, sister of the film's villain, Richie Madano (William Forsythe). Gershon also worked in television, with a recurring role on Melrose Place playing a prostitute working for a Heidi Fleiss-esque Hollywood madam.

In 1996, she played Corky, an ex-con who gets mixed up in an affair with Violet (played by Jennifer Tilly) in the crime film Bound. In 1997, she co-starred with John Travolta and Nicolas Cage in Face/Off.

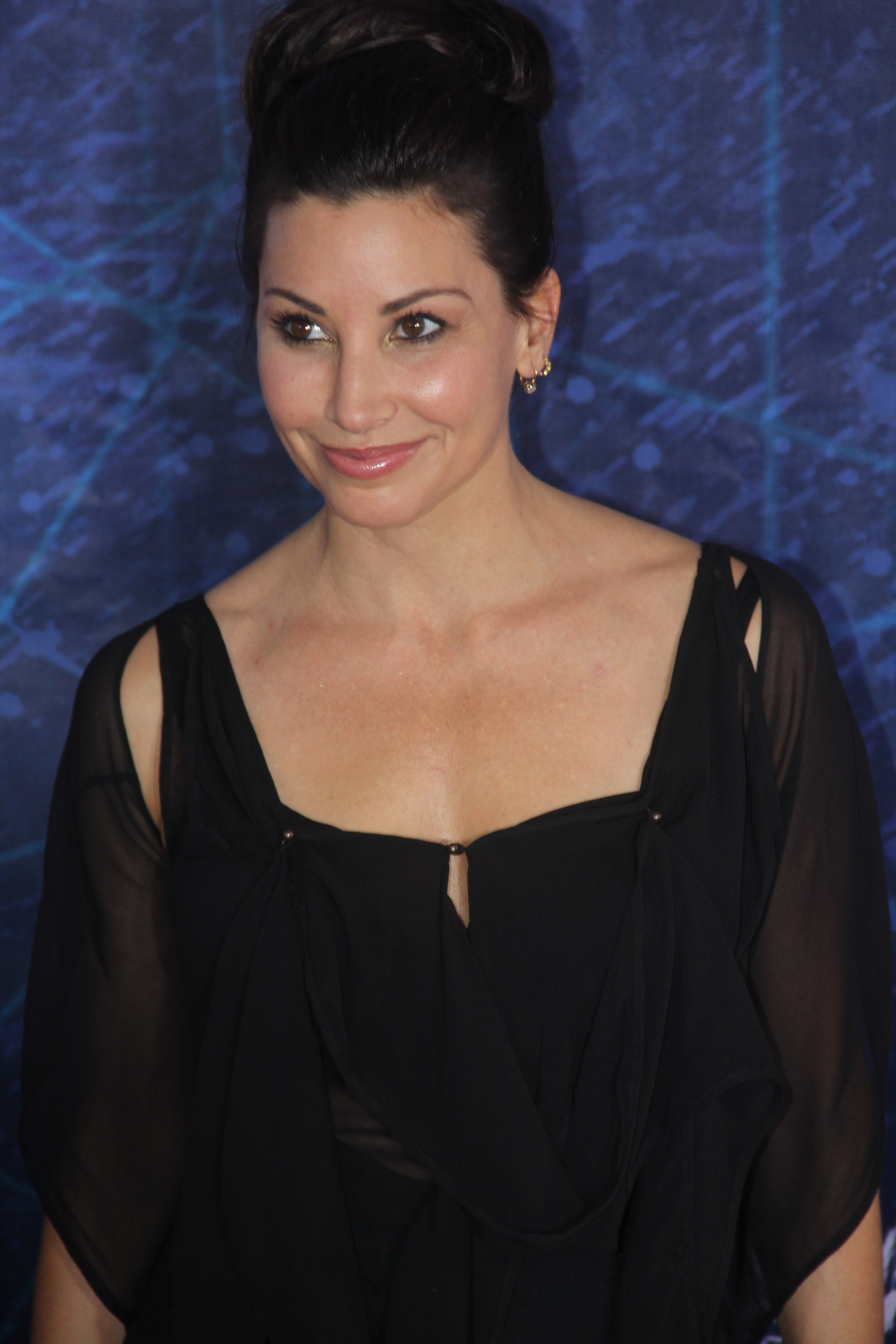
Gershon in June 2011

Gershon is regarded as a gay icon for her roles in films such as Bound (in which she played a butch lesbian), Prey for Rock & Roll, and Showgirls (in which she played a bisexual showgirl, and which is regarded as a camp classic). She was ranked #51 on the Maxim Hot 100 Women of 2004.

In 2011, Gershon appeared alongside Matthew McConaughey in Killer Joe, a dark comedy/thriller featuring director William Friedkin.

In 2017, Gershon starred in Bad Kids of Crestview Academy directed by Ben Browder, Lost Cat Corona directed by Anthony Tarsitano, the romantic comedy-drama Permission opposite Dan Stevens and Rebecca Hall directed by Brian Crano, Gershon co-starred alongside Nicolas Cage in the thriller Inconceivable, thriller film directed by Jonathan Baker, That same year, she starred in 9/11 directed by Martin Guigui revolving around the September 11 attacks opposite Whoopi Goldberg, Luis Guzmán and Charlie Sheen. The film was panned by critics and faced controversy for Sheen's history with the 911 Truth movement, a conspiracy theory. Gershon stated she was unaware of Sheen's comments during production of the film and would have spoken with Sheen and Guigui before agreeing to star.

In 2018, Gershon starred in the adventure drama American Dresser directed by Carmine Cangialosi, which was critically panned. Gershon then starred in the drama film After Everything directed by Hannah Marks and Joey Power, opposite Maika Monroe and Jeremy Allen White. The film had its world premiere at South by Southwest in March 2018, and was released in October 2018, to critical acclaim. She also had a small role in comedy Blockers directed by Kay Cannon, which was released on April 6, 2018, to critical and commercial success.

In 2020, Gershon starred in the sports film Cagefighter: Worlds Collide directed by Jesse Quinones. Gershon next starred in Rifkin's Festival directed by Woody Allen. Following backlash for starring in the film, Gershon defended her decision to star in the film stating: "I don't believe that to be true. You should really do all of the research and read all of the articles before believing that. It's really important to make up your own mind and not go by what the masses claim. I've done extensive research and I can say with very clear conscience that I'm so happy to be working with him. This man is not a sexual predator." Gershon also called working on the film "a dream come true". In 2021 Gershon starred in With/In an anthology film set during the COVID-19 pandemic directing from a screenplay she wrote.

=== TV and online work ===
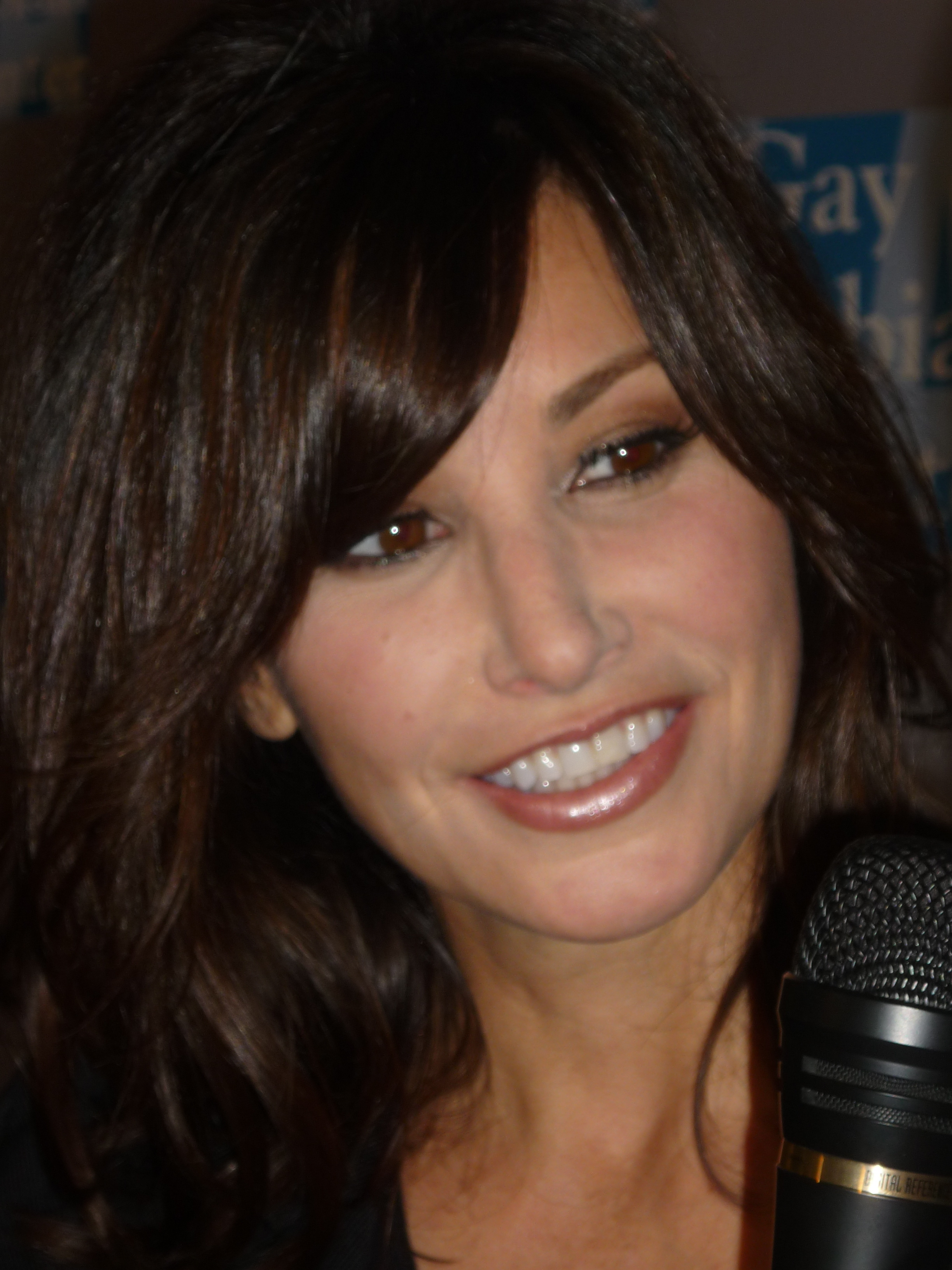
Gershon in May 2010

She portrayed Nancy Barbato, Frank Sinatra's 1st wife in the made-for-TV biopic Sinatra, in 1992. Gershon next had a recurring role on Melrose Place playing a prostitute working for a Heidi Fleiss-esque Hollywood madam. Gershon made a guest appearance as herself on The Larry Sanders Show. Gershon next starred in the lead role of Glenn Hall in ABC's detective series Snoops created by David E. Kelley, which was cancelled after one season.

Gershon has made numerous guest and recurring appearances on various shows including HBO's comedy series Curb Your Enthusiasm, FX's comedy-drama Rescue Me, ABC's Ugly Betty, USA Network's Psych, A recurring role on HBO's How to Make It in America.

Gershon voiced the role of Six in the adult animation series Tripping the Rift. Gershon also voiced the role of Catwoman in the 2007 animated series The Batman. From 2017 to 2018, Gershon voiced the role of Langwidere in Lost in Oz.

In 2013, Gershon starred in the television film House of Versace as Donatella Versace, which premiered on Lifetime. Gershon's performance earned praise from fashion critic Cathy Horyn. That same year, Gershon began starring in the Crackle action series Cleaners.

In 2015, Gershon made a guest appearance on Glee in the sixth and final season as Blaine's mother. From 2015 to 2017, Gershon had a recurring role on Amazon Prime Video's Red Oaks. She also appeared in two episodes of Elementary. That same year, Gershon had a recurring role on Z Nation. In 2016, Gershon guest starred on Empire. In 2017, Gershon guest starred on the HBO comedy series Crashing. That same year, Gershon had a recurring role in Brooklyn Nine-Nine as the villainous Lt. Melanie Hawkins. Gershon was cast in the E! dark comedy pilot #Fashionvictim opposite Willa Fitzgerald, which was not picked up to series. Since 2018, Gershon has had a recurring role on The CW drama Riverdale portraying the role of Jughead Jones's mother, Gladys. That same year, Gershon made a guest appearance on Younger.

In 2020, Gershon had a recurring role on New Amsterdam.

Gershon has appeared in two videos on Funny or Die parodying former Republican vice presidential nominee Sarah Palin, titled "Gina Gershon Strips Down Sarah Palin", and "Gina Gershon Does Sarah Palin 2". In 2016, Gershon parodied Melania Trump in a Funny or Die video "A Message from Melania Trump". Gershon additionally has played Trump on an episode of The Tonight Show Starring Jimmy Fallon, An Off-Broadway play, "The 1st Annual Trump Family Special". and in an episode of CBS All Access's The Good Fight.

=== Music ===
Gershon played Jaw harp on "I Can't Decide", a song on the Scissor Sisters 2006 release Ta-Dah. She also played Jaw harp on the song "I Do It For Your Love", Paul Simon's collaboration with Herbie Hancock on his album Possibilities, in a duo with bassist Christian McBride on the song "Chitlins and Gefiltefish", on McBride's 2011 album Conversations with Christian, and on "Maria" from her album In Search of Cleo.

She had a cameo role in The Cars' music video "Hello Again" (1984) alongside Andy Warhol, and appeared in Lenny Kravitz's music video "Again" (2000).

=== Books ===
Gershon and her brother Dann are the authors of the children's book Camp Creepy Time.

Gershon's first book written for adults, In Search of Cleo: How I Found My Pussy and Lost My Mind, is the true story of the hunt for her runaway cat and was released on October 11, 2012.

In March 2026, she released her autobiography Alphapussy.

== Personal life ==
From 2015 to 2018, Gershon was in a relationship with Belgian entrepreneur and former footballer Robert Dekeyser.

Her uncle was composer and conductor Jack Elliott, who co-wrote the themes for Barney Miller and Charlie's Angels.

== Acting credits ==
=== Film ===
| Year | Title | Role | Notes |
|---|---|---|---|
| 1981 | Beatlemania | Dancer | Uncredited |
| 1985 | Girls Just Want to Have Fun | Dancer | Uncredited |
| 1986 | Pretty in Pink | Trombley, Girl Friend / Gym Class | |
| 1986 | 3:15 the Moment of Truth | Cobrettes | |
| 1987 | Sweet Revenge | K.C. | |
| 1988 | Red Heat | Catherine 'Cat' Manzetti | |
| 1988 | Cocktail | Coral | |
| 1989 | Suffering Bastards | Sharnetta | |
| 1990 | Voodoo Dawn | Tina | |
| 1991 | City of Hope | Laurie Rinaldi | |
| 1991 | Out for Justice | Patti Madano | |
| 1991 | Jungle Fever | Angie's Neighbor | Deleted scenes |
| 1992 | The Player | Whitney Gersh | |
| 1993 | Joey Breaker | Jenny Chaser | |
| 1994 | Flinch | Daphne James | |
| 1995 | Best of the Best 3: No Turning Back | Margo Preston | |
| 1995 | Showgirls | Cristal Connors | Nominated – Razzie Award for Worst Supporting Actress |
| 1996 | Bound | Corky | Nominated – Saturn Award for Best Actress; Nominated – MTV Movie Award for Best Kiss |
| 1997 | This World, Then the Fireworks | Carol Lakewood Morton | |
| 1997 | Touch | Debra Lusanne | |
| 1997 | Face/Off | Sasha Hassler | |
| 1998 | Palmetto | Nina | |
| 1998 | Lulu on the Bridge | Hannah | |
| 1998 | Prague Duet | Dr. Lauren Graham | |
| 1998 | I'm Losing You | Lidia | |
| 1998 | One Tough Cop | Joey O'Hara | |
| 1999 | Guinevere | Billie | |
| 1999 | The Insider | Helen Caperelli | |
| 2001 | Driven | Cathy Heguy | |
| 2001 | Picture Claire | Lily Warden | |
| 2002 | Slackers | Girl at Trendy Club | Uncredited |
| 2002 | Demonlover | Elaine Si Gibril | |
| 2003 | Prey for Rock & Roll | Jacki | Also producer |
| 2004 | Three Way | Florence DeCroix Hagen | Also known as 3-Way |
| 2004 | Out of Season | Eileen Phillips | |
| 2005 | One Last Thing... | Arlene | |
| 2006 | Dreamland | Mary | |
| 2006 | Man About Town | Arlene Kreiner | |
| 2006 | Kettle of Fish | Ginger | |
| 2006 | I Want Someone to Eat Cheese With | Herself as Marty's Mother | |
| 2006 | Delirious | Dana | |
| 2007 | What Love Is | Rachel | |
| 2007 | P.S. I Love You | Sharon McCarthy | |
| 2008 | Just Business | Marty Jameson | |
| 2008 | Beer for My Horses | Cammie | |
| 2008 | Gina Gershon Strips Down Sarah Palin | Sarah Palin | Short film |
| 2009 | The Goods: Live Hard, Sell Hard | Unknown | Uncredited |
| 2010 | Love Ranch | Irene | |
| 2010 | Five Minarets in New York | Maria | Also known as Act of Vengeance and The Terrorist |
| 2010 | Across the Line: The Exodus of Charlie Wright | Mariel Garza | |
| 2011 | Sarah Palin Media Addict | Sarah Palin | Short film |
| 2011 | Killer Joe | Sharla Smith | Toronto Film Critics Association Award for Best Supporting Actress; Nominated – Saturn Award for Best Supporting Actress |
| 2012 | LOL | Kathy | |
| 2012 | Breathless | Lorna | |
| 2013 | Dealin' with Idiots | Sophie | |
| 2013 | House of Versace | Donatella Versace | |
| 2014 | The Scribbler | Cleo | |
| 2014 | Mall | Donna | Also known as Mall: A Day to Kill |
| 2014 | The Lookalike | Lee Garner | |
| 2014 | Sharklumbo | Widow | Short film |
| 2014 | Me | Gina Gershon | |
| 2015 | Staten Island Summer | Ms. Greeley | |
| 2016 | A Message from Melania Trump | Melania Trump | Short film |
| 2016 | My Dead Boyfriend | Helene | |
| 2017 | Bad Kids of Crestview Academy | Senator Wilkes | |
| 2017 | Lost Cat Corona | Connie | |
| 2017 | Permission | Lydia | |
| 2017 | Inconceivable | Angela | |
| 2017 | 9/11 | Eve Cage | |
| 2018 | After Everything | Tracy | |
| 2018 | Blockers | Cathy | |
| 2018 | The Little Mermaid | Peggy Gene | |
| 2018 | American Dresser | Sandra | |
| 2019 | The Investigation: A Search for the Truth in Ten Acts | K. T. McFarland / Rick Gates | Live reading of excerpts from the Mueller Report |
| 2019 | Red Shoes and the Seven Dwarfs | Regina | Voice |
| 2020 | The Mimic | The Woman at the Bar | |
| 2020 | Cagefighter: Worlds Collide | Max Drake | |
| 2020 | Rifkin's Festival | Sue | |
| 2020 | People in Landscape | Alex's Mother | |
| 2021 | With/In: Volume 2 | Unknown | Segment: "Shell Game"; also director and writer |
| 2021 | Don't Look Up | Kathy Logolos | Deleted scenes |
| 2022 | Emily the Criminal | Alice | |
| 2023 | Thanksgiving | Amanda Collins | |
| 2024 | Borderlands | Mad Moxxi | |
| 2024 | The Trainer | Bob Campbell | |
| 2025 | High Rollers | Amelia Decker | |
| 2025 | Breed of Greed | Susan Wendolyn | |
| TBA | Tapawingo † | Dot | Post-production |

Key
| † | Denotes films that have not yet been released |

=== Television ===
| Year | Title | Role | Notes |
|---|---|---|---|
| 1986 | Stark: Mirror Image | Alison Cromwell | Television film |
| 1987 | The Twilight Zone | Laura | Episode: "Time and Teresa Golowitz" |
| 1989 | The Days and Nights of Molly Dodd | Randy Lewis | 3 episodes |
| 1989 | Monsters | Ann | Episode: "Jar" |
| 1990 | Cop Rock | Stacey Kane | Episode: "The Cocaine Mutiny" |
| 1992 | Miss Rose White | Angie | Television film |
| 1992 | Sinatra | Nancy Barbato Sinatra | Miniseries |
| 1993 | Love Matters | Heat | Television film |
| 1993 | Melrose Place | Ellen | 3 episodes |
| 1994 | The Untouchables | Becky Petrov | Episode: "The Skin Trade" |
| 1997 | Ellen | Cashier | Episode: "The Puppy Episode: Part 2"; uncredited |
| 1998 | Legalese | Angela Beale | Television film |
| 1998 | The Larry Sanders Show | Herself | Episode: “Just the Perfect Blendship” |
| 1999 | Black and White | Nora 'Hugs' Hugosian | Television film |
| 1999–2000 | Snoops | Glenn Hall | Main role |
| 2000 | Saturday Night Live | Wilma Slotsin | Episode: "Jackie Chan/Kid Rock"; uncredited |
| 2002–2003 | Just Shoot Me! | Rhonda Ferrara | 2 episodes |
| 2002 | Borderline | Dr. Lila Coletti | Television film |
| 2003 | Spider-Man: The New Animated Series | Shikata | Voice, 2 episodes |
| 2003 | The Restaurant | Herself | 1 episode |
| 2004 | The Practice | Glenn Hall | Episode: "The Firm" |
| 2004 | Tripping the Rift | Six | Voice, main role (season 1) |
| 2004 | Kevin Hill | Carly Austin | Episode: "The Good Life" |
| 2004 | Curb Your Enthusiasm | Anna | Episode: "The Survivor" |
| 2004–2007 | The Batman | Selina Kyle / Catwoman | Voice, 5 episodes |
| 2005 | The Studio | Bebe Knight | Episode: "Pilot" |
| 2005 | Crossing Jordan | Charlie Davis | Episode: "Embraceable You" |
| 2005 | Family Guy | Policewoman | Voice, episode: "Blind Ambition" |
| 2005 | Category 7: The End of the World | FEMA Director Judith Carr | Television film |
| 2005 | American Dad! | Karen, additional voices | 2 episodes |
| 2006–2007 | Ugly Betty | Fabia | Recurring role (season 1) |
| 2007 | Psych | Emilina Saffron | Episode: "American Duos" |
| 2007 | Curb Your Enthusiasm | Anna | Episode: "The Anonymous Donor" |
| 2007–2009 | Rescue Me | Valerie | Recurring role (seasons 4-5) |
| 2008 | I Love the New Millennium | Herself | Commentator |
| 2009 | Life on Mars | Rita | Episode: "Coffee, Tea, or Annie" |
| 2009 | Numb3rs | Danielle Hill | Episode: "12:01 AM" |
| 2009 | Eastbound & Down | Realtor | Episode: "Chapter 5" |
| 2009 | Everything She Ever Wanted | Pat Allanson | Miniseries |
| 2010 | Glory Daze | Lt. Lang | Episode: "What's Love Got to Nude with It" |
| 2011 | How to Make It in America | Nancy Frankenburg | 7 episodes |
| 2013 | Maron | Alexa | Episode: "A Real Woman" |
| 2013 | House of Versace | Donatella Versace | Television film |
| 2013 | Hunt For the Labyrinth Killer | Karen Donovan | Television film |
| 2013 | Anger Management | Mandy | Episode: "Charlie Loses His Virginity Again" |
| 2013–2014 | Cleaners | Mother | Main role |
| 2014 | Elementary | Elana March | 2 episodes |
| 2014 | Community | Devon's wife | Episode: "VCR Maintenance and Educational Publishing" |
| 2015 | Glee | Pam Anderson | Episode: "A Wedding" |
| 2015–2017 | Red Oaks | Fay Getty | Recurring role |
| 2015 | Z Nation | La Reina de la Muerte | Recurring role (season 2) |
| 2016 | Empire | Heleen Von Wyatt | Episode: "The Unkindest Cut" |
| 2017 | Crashing | Susie | Episode: "The Road" |
| 2017 | Brooklyn Nine-Nine | Lt. Melanie Hawkins | Recurring role (seasons 4-5) |
| 2017 | Lost in Oz | Langwidere (voice) | |
| 2018 | Younger | Chrissie Hart | Episode: "Sex, Liza and Rock & Roll" |
| 2018–2019 | Riverdale | Gladys Jones | Recurring role (season 3) |
| 2019 | The Good Fight | "Melania Trump" | Episode: "The One with the Celebrity Divorce" |
| 2020–2021 | New Amsterdam | Jeanie Bloom | Recurring role |
| 2020 | Loafy | Slippy Parker | Voice, 5 episodes |
| 2021 | Betty | Oracle | Episode: "Sweet Tooth" |
| 2022 | Chucky | Herself | Episode: "Death on Denial" |
| 2023 | Awkwafina Is Nora from Queens | Toe / Dr. Emily Cohen | Episode: "Nightmares" |
| 2024 | Elsbeth | Dr. Vanessa Holmes | Episode: "An Ear for an Ear" |
| 2024 | Doctor Odyssey | Lenore Laurent | Episode: "Plastic Surgery Week" |
| 2025 | The Assassin | Marie | 5 episodes |
| 2026 | King of the Hill | Marina Butler | Voice, episode: "Hank Encounters of the Nerd Kind" |

=== Video game ===
| Year | Title | Role | Notes |
|---|---|---|---|
| 2025 | Doom: The Dark Ages | The Witch | |

=== Theater ===
| Year | Title | Role | Theatre | Notes |
|---|---|---|---|---|
| 1998 | Cabaret | Sally Bowles | Henry Miller's Theatre / Studio 54 | |
| 2008 | Boeing-Boeing | Gabriella | Longacre Theatre | |
| 2009 | Bye Bye Birdie | Rose Alvarez | Henry Miller Theatre | |
| 2014 | Ghost Brothers of Darkland County | Monique McCandless | Various (18-city tour) | |

=== Music ===
| Year | Title | Notes |
|---|---|---|
| 2007 | In Search of Cleo | |

=== Podcast ===
| Year | Title | Role | Notes |
|---|---|---|---|
| 2020 | The Pack Podcast | Narrator | |
| 2021 | The Playboy Interview | Oriana Fallaci | 2 episodes |
