= American Dresser =

2018 film directed by Carmine Cangialosi

- Theatrical release poster
- Directed by: Carmine Cangialosi
- Written by: Carmine Cangialosi
- Produced by: Carmine Cangialosi; Ryan R. Johnson; Martin Sprock
- Starring: Tom Berenger; Keith David; Gina Gershon; Penelope Ann Miller; Jeff Fahey; Bruce Dern
- Cinematography: Jesse Brunt
- Edited by: Peter Devaney Flanagan
- Music by: Marc Vanocur
- Production companies: The Film House; Go With The Flo Films; Sprockefeller Pictures
- Distributed by: Cinedigm
- Release dates: February 15, 2018 (Berlin); September 21, 2018 (United States)
- Running time: 97 minutes
- Country: United States
- Language: English

American Dresser is a 2018 American adventure drama film written and directed by Carmine Cangialosi, and starring Tom Berenger, Keith David, Gina Gershon, Penelope Ann Miller, Jeff Fahey and Bruce Dern.

== Cast ==
- Tom Berenger as John Moore
- Keith David as Charlie
- Carmine Cangialosi as Willie
- Gina Gershon as Sandra
- Penelope Ann Miller as Vera
- Bruce Dern as King
- Jeff Fahey as Calhoun

== Reception ==
The film has a 0% rating on Rotten Tomatoes.
