= Dario Vitale =

Italian fashion designer

- Born: 1983 (age 42–43); Naples, Italy
- Education: Istituto Marangoni
- Occupation: Fashion designer
- Title: Creative Director, Emporio Armani and Giorgio Armani (accessories)
- Term: September 2026–present
- Predecessor: Giorgio Armani

Dario Vitale (born 1983) is an Italian fashion designer, creative director of Emporio Armani and of accessories at Giorgio Armani. Vitale was creative director of Versace from April 2025 till his dismissal by Prada Group in December 2025.

== Early life and education ==
Vitale was born on 11/04/1983 in Nocera Inferiore,Italy. In 2006 he graduated from Istituto Marangoni.

== Career ==
Vitale began his career at Dsquared2, then working at Bottega Veneta under the direction of Tomas Maier. In 2010 Vitale joined Miu Miu, rising to the role of ready-to-wear and head of image before exiting the fashion house in January 2025.

On 1 April 2025, Vitale was appointed Chief Creative Officer of Versace. Becoming the first person outside the Versace family to lead the fashion house, following the departure of Donatella Versace in March 2025. His first and only collection for Versace was shown on 26 September at the Pinacoteca Ambrosiana in Milan. Vanessa Friedman of The New York Times called it "one of the most buzzed about, debated and potentially influential [collections] of the recent runway season." On 12 December 2025, Vitale was dismissed from his role following the acquisition of Versace by Prada Group.

In September 2026, Vitale was appointed creative director of Emporio Armani and accessories at Giorgio Armani.
