= The British School of Milan =

British international school in Milan, Italy

Location
- Via Carlo Alberto Pisani Dossi, 16; Milan 20134; Italy; 45°29′14.59″N 9°14′40.39″E

Information
- Former name: The Sir James Henderson School
- Type: British
- Motto: Learning to Excel
- Established: 1969
- School district: Lambrate
- Principal: Simon Lockyer
- Staff: 140
- Years offered: Nursery to Year 13
- Enrollment: 800
- Website: www.britishschoolmilan.com

The British School of Milan (BSM), formerly The Sir James Henderson School, is a not-for-profit co-educational day school offering a British International education to students between the age of 3 – 18. Founded in 1969 by members of the British Community in Milan, the school was originally named after Sir James Henderson, a member of the British Chamber of Commerce.

== History ==
The school's first location was in Via Mancinelli, 3, with separate premises for the Senior School opening in Viale Lombardia not long after. In 1996, the school moved to its current location in Via Pisani Dossi, 16, reuniting the Primary and Senior Schools on one campus, with advanced plans to move to a new building. Since 1969, eleven Principals have been appointed to lead the school.

== Overview ==
The BSM currently hosts 760 students. The common language is English, but the school places importance on cultural diversity, following the UK National Curriculum from Nursery to Year 11, with the International Baccalaureate Diploma (IB) pursued in Years 12 and 13. The School is rated among the top IB schools in Europe, and it is the only school in Milan passing all the standards set by UK Government Inspectors (ISI). The BSM aims to inspire learning within a caring, creative and international community, to pursue excellence, and enable students to fulfill their ambitions.

In the last years, students have gained places at a range of top universities including Oxford, Cambridge, Yale, Columbia, Imperial College London, LSE, University College London, University of Edinburgh, Trinity College Dublin, Bocconi, University of British Columbia, Sciences-Po Paris and other leading institutions.

The school places emphasis on creativity, including music, art, and, drama and serves as the Italian centre for the exam board for the Royal School of Music (ABRSM). There is a tradition of community service with students pursuing CAS projects within the IB and the Duke of Edinburgh’s Award Scheme. It also offers over 100 co-curricular activities and three IB Academic Scholarships per year.

== Notable alumni ==
- Allegra Versace
- Emilia Wickstead
- Maurizio Giuliano
