= Donatella Versace =

Italian fashion luxury designer (born 1955)

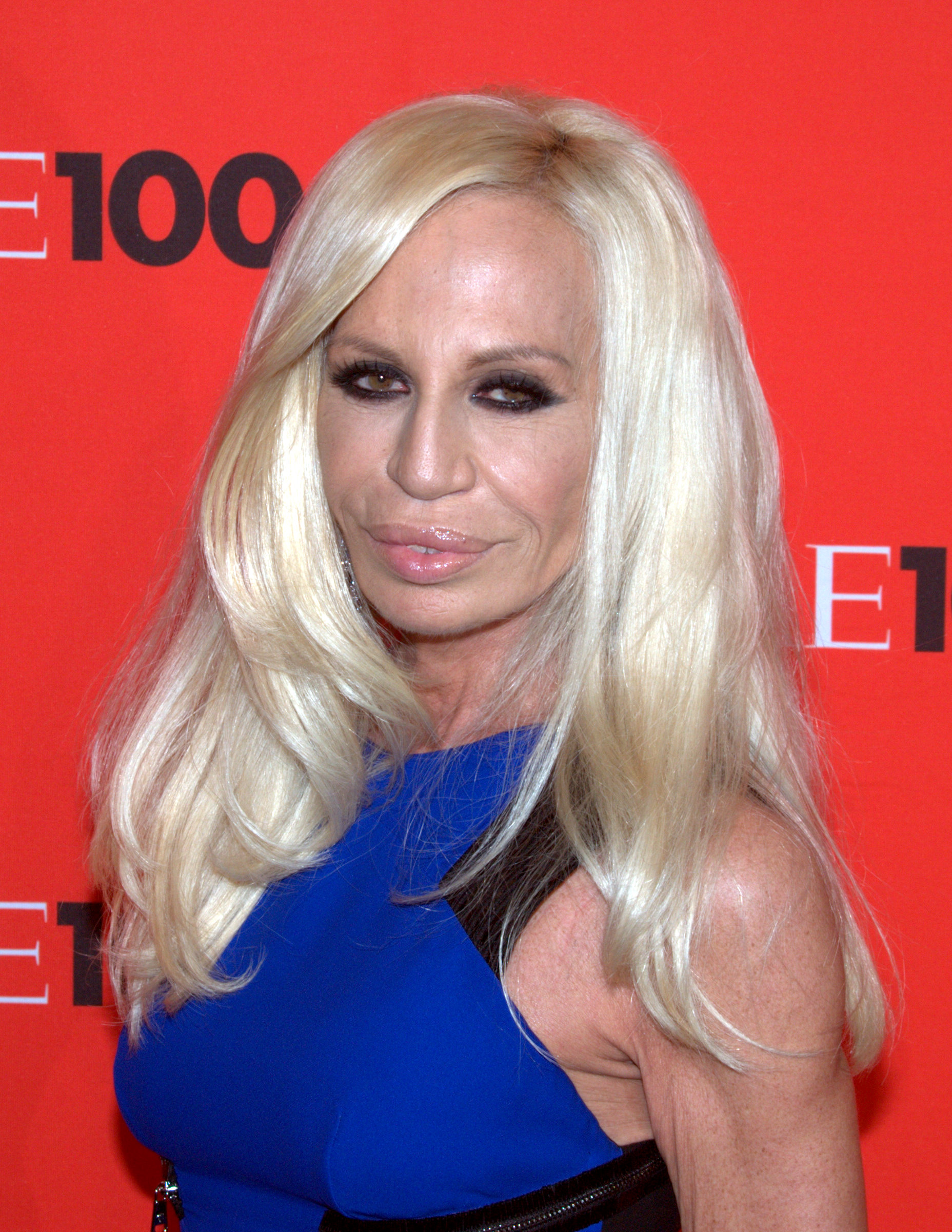
- Versace in 2010
- Born: Donatella Francesca Versace; 2 May 1955 (age 71); Reggio Calabria, Italy
- Occupations: Creative director; Fashion designer; Luxury businesswoman
- Board member of: Versace; Versus; Palazzo Versace Dubai; Elton John AIDS Foundation
- Spouses: Paul Beck (m. 1983; div. 2000) Manuel Dallori (m. 2004; div. 2005)
- Children: Daniel and Allegra
- Relatives: Santo Versace (brother); Gianni Versace (brother)

Vice president of Versace
- In office 1978–1997
- President: Santo Versace
- Preceded by: Office established
- Succeeded by: Jorge Saud

Chief executive officer of Versace
- In office 1997–2004 Serving with Santo Versace and Jorge Saud
- President: Santo Versace
- Preceded by: Gianni Versace
- Succeeded by: Allegra Versace

Creative director of Versace
- In office 1997–2025
- President: Santo Versace
- Preceded by: Gianni Versace
- Website: versace.com

Donatella Francesca Versace (Italian: [donaˈtɛlla franˈtʃeska verˈsaːtʃe]; (Note: According to a January 2018 Vogue interview with Versace, her name is correctly pronounced /vərˈsɑːtʃeɪ/ vər-SAH-chay in English as opposed to the popular pronunciation of /vərˈsɑːtʃi/ vər-SAH-chee.) born 2 May 1955) is an Italian fashion designer, businesswoman, socialite, and model. She is the sister of Gianni Versace, founder of the luxury fashion company Versace, with whom she worked closely on the development of the brand and in particular its combining of Italian luxury with pop culture and celebrity.

Upon Gianni's death in 1997, she inherited a portion of the Versace brand and became its creative director. She is currently the brand's chief brand ambassador. Along with her brother Gianni, she is widely credited for the supermodel phenomenon of the 1990s by casting editorial models on the runway.

== Early life and education ==
Donatella Versace was born in Reggio di Calabria, Italy, the youngest of four children; her siblings were Santo, Gianni, and Tina. Her father, Antonio Versace, helped run the family coal mining business, and her mother, Francesca Versace (née Olandese), was a seamstress for a fashion company before setting up her own fashion boutique. Her older sister, Tina, died at the age of 12 from an improperly treated tetanus infection. Always close to her brother Gianni, Versage was persuaded by him to dye her hair blonde at 11 years old in honor of the Italian singer Patty Pravo, of whom he was a fan.

In the mid-1970s, Versace studied literature and languages in Florence. On the weekends, she would commute to Milan to work with Gianni, who was working at the Callaghan fashion label. Versache's mother did not approve, wanting her to focus instead on her studies, and would check up on her with surprise visits to Florence.

== Career ==
Versace was always interested only in a career in the fashion and model industry, stating, "I knew I was going to work in fashion; I really didn't think of nothing else." In 1976, Versace and Santo joined their brother Gianni in Milan. The three travelled to the United States in 1977 on a three-week tour in search of press and overseas buyers in anticipation of starting the Versace brand.

The Versace brand was established in 1978, with Donatella as vice president. She collaborated with Gianni across all projects, especially in styling, creating the brand image, and designing the brand's accessories, shoes, and handbags. In 1982, Gianni sent her to an auction where she placed the winning bid on the palazzo at Via Gesù 12 in Milan which would become the Versace headquarters and showroom.

Versace is widely considered to have been both a creative partner and muse to Gianni. In 1989, Gianni dedicated the new Blonde perfume to her, and entrusted the Versus diffusion line to her – gifting her a yellow diamond ring to mark the occasion. During 1996 and early 1997, with Gianni Versace recovering from a cancer of the left ear, Donatella took over much of the decision-making for the Versace brand.

Versace has described her approach to design as being rooted in images, saying "I don't look at the clothes with my eyes, I look through images – a picture, or a video." She is often cited as developing the Versace look. She worked with fashion photographer Richard Avedon on the Spring-Summer 1980 campaign shoot, his first for the brand, and would art direct Avedon on the Spring-Summer 1993 campaign.

Gianni was murdered on 15 July 1997, outside the re-constructed Casa Casuarina, also known as Versace Mansion, in Miami, Florida. In the aftermath of the highly publicized crime and manhunt, most of the Versace family, including Donatella, moved temporarily to a secluded private resort in the Caribbean. Her brother, Santo Versace, inherited 30% of Versace upon Gianni's death and her daughter, Allegra Versace, inherited 50%. Gianni Versace's book The Art of Being You, published posthumously in 1997, includes a dedication to Gianni from Donatella and Santo which reads "This book is a tribute to a great artist himself, to someone who lived with an incredible love for art, to a very special person who was always fascinated by art and artists and always supported them, our brother Gianni".

On 18 July 1998, one year and three days after Gianni's death, Donatella Versace mounted her first haute couture show for the Versace Atelier at the Hôtel Ritz Paris. She built her runway over the hotel's swimming pool, as her brother had done every season, though this time using sheer glass. From October 2002 to January 2003, Gianni and Donatella's best known Versace clothing was displayed in a special exhibit of the Victoria and Albert Museum in London.

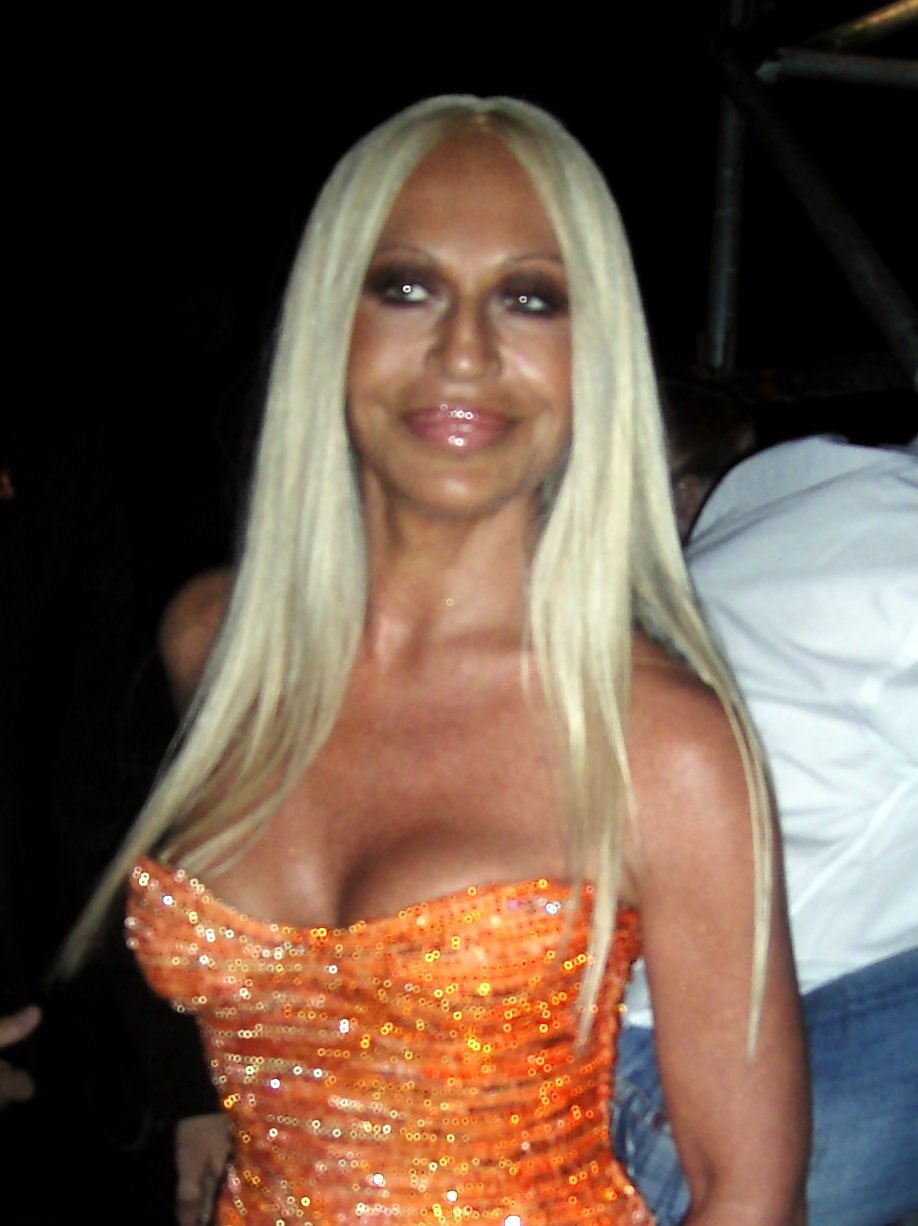
Donatella Versace in 2005

She has designed advertising campaigns for Versace that included Madonna, Courtney Love, Christina Aguilera, Jonathan Rhys Meyers, Demi Moore, Nicki Minaj, Lady Gaga, Beyoncé and January Jones. She designed the green Versace dress of Jennifer Lopez, also known as the "Jungle-Dress", which was worn by Lopez at the 42nd Grammy Awards in 2000. In 2015, she appeared in the AW15 ad campaign of its direct competitor Givenchy.

Versace designed the Palazzo Versace Australia resort on the Gold Coast, Queensland, Australia, which opened in September 2000, and played a major role in the design of the Palazzo Versace Dubai, the second Palazzo Versace hotel, which opened in November 2016. She also designed a Mini Cooper car for the Life Ball. In September 2017, Donatella Versace set up a tribute show dedicated to her brother.

On 12 March 2025, after almost 28 years as CEO of the Versace brand, she announced her departure, a position she will hold until the summer when Dario Vitale, the former design and image director of Italian brand Miu Miu will take over.

== Personal life ==
Versace and her former husband, American model Paul Beck, have two children: daughter Allegra Versace Beck (born 30 June 1986), and son Daniel Versace Beck (born 1989). Her marriage with Paul Beck ended in 2000.

She was addicted to cocaine for 18 years until 2005. She was a heavy smoker, but quit in 2014.

She reportedly divides her time between residences in Milan and on Lake Maggiore.

== Awards ==
- 1996: De Beers Diamonds International Award for her design of a gold and diamond tiara, produced by Gianni Versace.
- 2004: Bambi Award for Fashion
- 2005: World Fashion Award as Designer of the Year, at the Women's World Awards
- 2007: Honored along with Gianni Versace by The City of Beverly Hills and the Rodeo Drive Committee for their contributions to the fashion world with a Rodeo Drive Walk of Style Award.
- 2008: FGI Superstar Award
- 2008: Honorary chairman of Fashion Fringe
- 2009: Honorary chairman of Fashion Fringe for the second year running
- 2010: Woman of the Year by Glamour
- 2012: Speaker at the Oxford Union
- 2012, 2016: Fashion Designer of the Year by Glamour
- 2017: Fashion Icon of the Year award by the British Fashion Council
- 2018: First woman to be named as the Designer of the Year at the GQ Men of the Year Awards in the UK and in China.
- 2018: International CFDA Award
- 2018: Fashion Icon Award at GQ Awards Berlin
- 2023: Humanitarian Award for Equity and Inclusivity at the Camera Nazionale della Moda Italia Sustainable Fashion Awards
- 2024: Game Changer Honor at the Green Carpet Fashion Awards (GCFA)
- 2025: Positive Change Award at CFDA Awards
- 2026: Icon Award at Attitude Awards

== In popular culture ==
Versace made a cameo appearance in Zoolander. In The Devil Wears Prada, her name was mentioned sporadically.

At the 42nd Grammy Awards (2000), Jennifer Lopez wore the Green Jungle Dress, which became an international point of attention, being highly publicised in the media. It was designed by Versace herself and Lopez has the original dress currently with her at her estate. The dress worn by Lopez remains the reason for the creation of Google Images, and is known to have been downloaded over 600,000 times within 24 hours of the Grammy's night. In 2019, Lopez wore the dress for the first time since 2001 for the Versace Milan Fashion Show.

Versace was parodied several times by Maya Rudolph on Saturday Night Live.

In the ABC series Ugly Betty, a fictional character called Fabia, played by actress Gina Gershon, is a parody of Versace. Gershon also played Versace as the lead role in the Lifetime television film House of Versace, released in 2013.

Lady Gaga wrote the song "Donatella" from her album Artpop (2013) for her.

The plot of season 2 of the television series American Crime Story recounts the murder of Donatella's brother Gianni. She is portrayed by Penélope Cruz. She criticized the authenticity of the TV series, stating that she was with Madonna when the murder occurred, a moment that is not in the pictures.

In 2022, Versace took part in an onstage skit alongside musicians Dua Lipa and Megan Thee Stallion at the 64th Annual Grammy Awards. Dua and Megan came to the stage in matching black floor-length gowns before Versace joined them on the stage and unclipped a part of each dress to reveal different looks. The moment was a tribute to a skit between Mariah Carey and Whitney Houston at the 1998 VMAs. Also in 2022, Versace's team assisted with making Cardi B's shiny gold chain outfit for the Met Gala. This dress took around 20 people to make, with each chain being hand embroidered.

In 2023, Versace designed a strapless safety pin dress with white tweed, pearl accents and camellia flower details which was worn by Anne Hathaway at the Met Gala.

The character Donatello Versus in Stone Ocean, Part 6 of the JoJo's Bizarre Adventure manga, is named after her.

In 2026, Versace made a cameo appearance in The Devil Wears Prada 2, starring Meryl Streep, Anne Hathaway, Stanley Tucci and Emily Blunt.
