= Gianni Versace =

Italian fashion designer (1946–1997)

- Born: Giovanni Maria Versace; 2 December 1946; Reggio Calabria, Italy
- Died: 15 July 1997 (aged 50); Jackson Memorial Hospital, Miami, Florida, U.S.
- Cause of death: Murder (gunshot wounds)
- Resting place: Near Cernobbio, Italy
- Occupation: Luxury fashion designer
- Label: Versace
- Partner: Antonio D'Amico (1982–1997)
- Relatives: Santo Versace (brother); Donatella Versace (sister); Allegra Versace (niece)
- Website: versace.com

Giovanni Maria "Gianni" Versace (Italian: [dʒoˈvanni maˈriːa ˈdʒanni verˈsaːtʃe]; (Note: According to a January 2018 Vogue interview with Donatella Versace, Versace is correctly pronounced /vərˈsɑːtʃeɪ/ vər-SAH-chay in English, closer to the native Italian pronunciation, as opposed to the popular pronunciation of /vərˈsɑːtʃi/ vər-SAH-chee.) 2 December 1946 – 15 July 1997) was an Italian fashion designer and businessman. He was the founder of Versace, an international luxury-fashion house that produces accessories, fragrances, make-up, home furnishings and clothes. He also designed costumes for theatre and films. As a friend of Eric Clapton, Princess Diana, Whitney Houston, Naomi Campbell, Kate Moss, Madonna, Elton John, Tupac Shakur, Joan Collins and many other celebrities, he was one of the first designers to link fashion to the music world. He and his partner Antonio D'Amico were regulars on the international party scene. The place where he was born and raised, Reggio di Calabria, greatly influenced his career.

On 15 July 1997, he was murdered outside his Miami Beach mansion, Casa Casuarina, by spree killer Andrew Cunanan.

== Early life ==
Giovanni Maria Versace was born in the city of Reggio Calabria on 2 December 1946 and grew up with his elder brother Santo Versace and younger sister Donatella Versace, along with their father and dressmaker mother, Francesca. An older sister, Tina, died at age 12 because of an improperly treated tetanus infection.

Versace was strongly influenced by ancient Greek history, which dominates the historical landscape of his birthplace. He attended Liceo Classico Tommaso Campanella, where he studied Latin and ancient Greek, without completing the course. He was also influenced by Andy Warhol.

Versace began his apprenticeship at a young age at his mother's sewing business, which employed up to a dozen seamstresses. He became interested in architecture before moving to Milan at the age of 26 to work in fashion design.

In 1973, he became the designer of "Byblos", a successful Genny's youthful line and in 1977, he designed Complice, another, more experimental, line for Genny. A few years later, encouraged by his success, Versace presented his first signature collection for women at the Palazzo Della Permanente Art Museum of Milan. His first fashion show followed in September of the same year. His first boutique was opened in Milan's Via della Spiga in 1978.

== Fashion empire ==
After opening his Milan boutique in 1978, Versace quickly became a sensation on the international fashion scene. His designs employed vivid colours, bold prints and sexy cuts, which were a refreshing contrast to the prevailing taste for muted colours and simplicity. His aesthetic, which "combined luxurious classicism with overt sexuality", attracted much criticism in addition to praise. He is quoted as saying, "I don't believe in good taste", which was reflected in his "brazen defiance of the rules of fashion". A saying referencing Versace's rivalry with Giorgio Armani was: "Armani dresses the wife, Versace dresses the mistress."

Gianni Versace often drew inspiration from historical periods like Classicism, Byzantium, the 18th century and the 1920s and 1930s. His designs reimagined elements such as Ravenna's mosaics and Roman drapery, incorporating them into contemporary fashion.

From 1978, Versace built the company with the support of his family, employing his sister Donatella as vice-president and his brother Santo as president of the company. Donatella's purview extended to creative oversight, where she acted as a key consultant to Versace. Gianni would also come to employ Donatella's husband, Paul Beck, as menswear director.

Among Versace's most famous innovations was his 1982 invention of a type of super-light chainmail called 'Oroton', which became a signature material in his outfits. His suits were inspired more by his experience in female tailoring, departing from masculine Savile Row models by crafting suits that accentuated the male form and "insisted on men as sex objects".

Versace was very proud of his southern Italian heritage and infused his designs with motifs inspired by historical fashion and art movements, especially Graeco-Roman art. This is evident in the company's logo, the Medusa Head and recurring motifs such as the Greek key. He also allowed his love for contemporary art to inspire his work, creating graphic prints based on the art of Roy Lichtenstein and Andy Warhol.

Versace's work was deeply influenced by art, from Gustav Klimt, Robert Delaunay and Alexander Calder to Andy Warhol and Jim Dine. He often collaborated with contemporary artists and used their works as motifs in his designs. For example, one of his collections featured dresses inspired by Warhol's portraits of Marilyn Monroe and James Dean. Versace also drew inspiration from Pablo Picasso and his appreciation for the artist extended beyond his fashion creations. He was an avid art collector and owned several works by Picasso. Following his death, 25 pieces from his personal Picasso collection were auctioned, showcasing his deep connection to the artist.

In 1982, Versace expanded the business into jewellery and housewares, designing luxury furnishings, china and textiles for the home. He was unusual in retaining complete creative control over all aspects of his company. In 1984 and '85, he contributed a specially appointed Gianni Versace Edition to the Mark VII line of American luxury automaker Lincoln. In 1989, the firm expanded into haute couture with the launch of Atelier Versace. Versace became known for employing celebrities in his marketing campaigns and seating them in the front rows of his fashion shows, the first to do so. He is also credited with inventing the supermodel vogue of the 1990s, by discovering and featuring major supermodels such as Naomi Campbell, Christy Turlington and Linda Evangelista, all of whom he featured both on the runway and in advertisement campaigns.

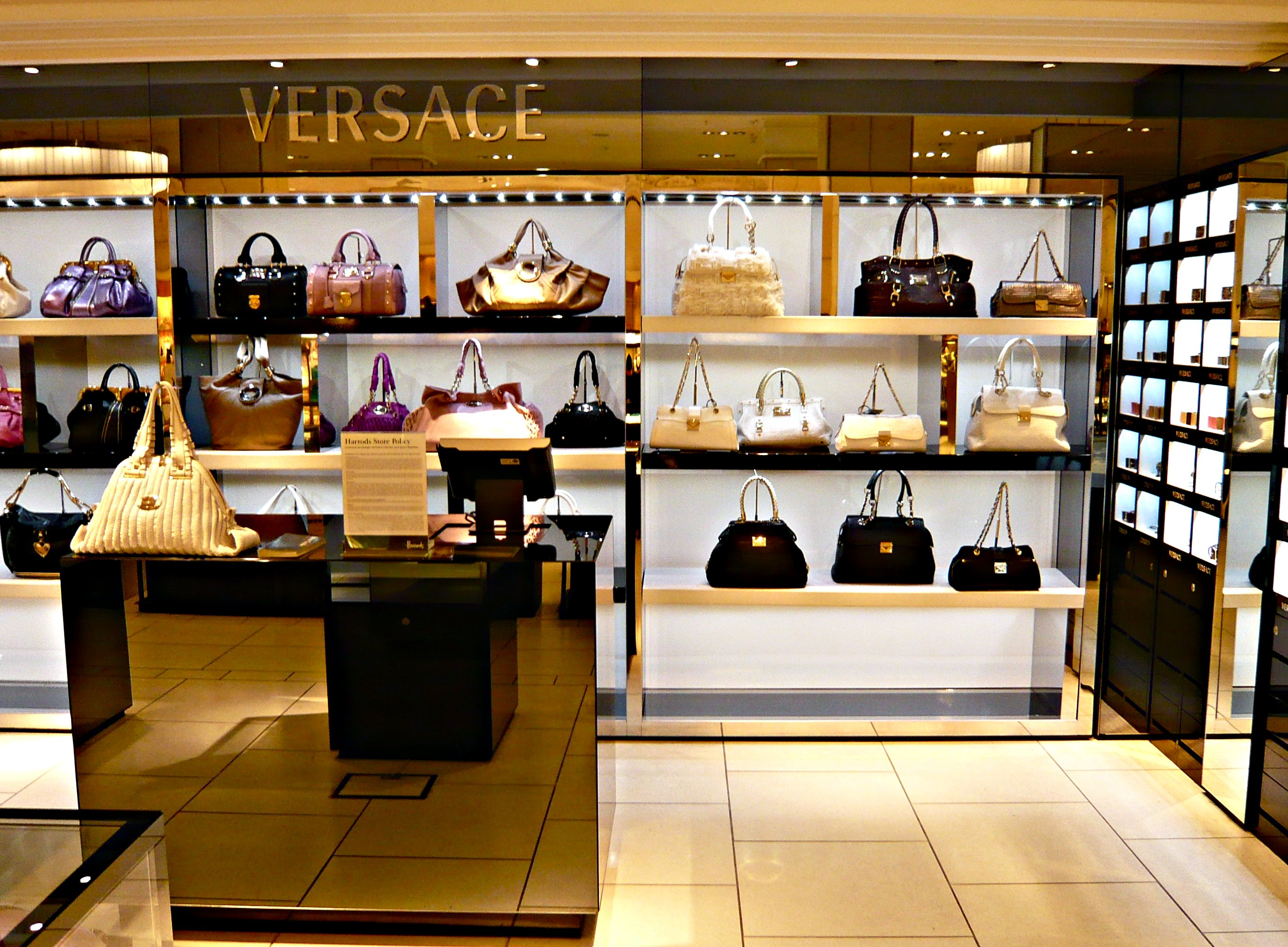
Inside of Versace store featuring multiple designer handbags

At the time of his death, Versace's empire was valued at $807 million and included 130 boutiques across the world.

=== Stage designs ===
Throughout his career, Versace was a prolific costume designer for stage productions and performing artists. He stated, "for me the theatre is liberation" and his designs were well served by his penchant for bold colours, drapery, embellishment and an encyclopaedic knowledge of fashion history. He was a collaborator at the La Scala Theatre Ballet in Milan and designed the costumes for the Strauss ballet Josephslegende in 1982 and Donizetti's Don Pasquale. He also designed the costumes for five Béjart Ballet productions: Dionysos (1984), Leda and the Swan (1987), Malraux ou la Métamorphoses des Dieux (1986), Chaka Zulu (1989) and the Ballet du XXme Siècle. In 1990, he designed the costumes for the San Francisco Opera's production of Capriccio. Versace designed the clothing worn by Michael Jackson and Paul McCartney on their 1983 "Say Say Say" video and Elton John's costumes for his The One Tour.

== Personal life ==
Versace met his partner Antonio D'Amico, a model, in 1982. Their relationship lasted until Versace's murder. During this time, Versace was diagnosed with ear cancer. He was declared cancer free six months before he was murdered.

Versace was known for adoration towards his nieces and nephews: Santo's two children, Francesca and Antonio and Donatella's two children, Allegra and Daniel.

== Death ==
On the morning of 15 July 1997, in Miami Beach, Florida, Versace exited his mansion and walked on Ocean Drive to retrieve his morning magazines. Usually, Versace would have an assistant walk from his home to the nearby News Cafe to get his magazines, but on this occasion, he decided to go himself. Versace had returned and was climbing the steps of his Miami Beach mansion when Andrew Cunanan, a spree killer who had earlier murdered four other men (including his friend Jeffrey Trail, former boyfriend David Madson and real estate developer Lee Miglin) shot him in the head at point-blank range with a .40 calibre Taurus PT100. Versace was pronounced dead at Jackson Memorial Hospital in Miami, at 9:21 am. He was 50 years old at the time of his death. Versace's murder was witnessed by his former UK senior stylist, Dean Aslett, who was on vacation in South Beach, Miami and had partied with Versace a few days prior. Cunanan died by suicide on a houseboat eight days after Versace's murder.

Cunanan was obsessed with the designer and often bragged about his close "friendship" with Versace, although this was symptomatic of Cunanan's delusions of grandeur: he often falsely claimed to have met celebrities. However, FBI agents firmly believe that Versace and Cunanan had previously met in San Francisco, although what their relationship entailed is still a mystery. Maureen Orth published a 2008 article in Vanity Fair reporting that Cunanan and Versace had met briefly at a San Francisco nightclub in 1990 (according to several eyewitness claims) and that they could have interacted on further occasions because both were involved in sex-for-hire circles in Miami and San Francisco. However, Versace's family has always steadfastly denied that the two ever met. Police have said that they do not know why Versace was killed. "I don't know that we are ever going to know the answers", said Miami Beach Police Chief Richard Barreto.

=== Memorial ===
Versace's body was cremated and his ashes returned to the family's estate near Cernobbio and buried in the family vault at Moltrasio cemetery near Lake Como. Versace's funeral liturgy, held at Milan Cathedral, was attended by over 2,000 people, including Carolyn Bessette-Kennedy, Naomi Campbell, Elton John, Whitney Houston, and Diana, Princess of Wales.

== Legacy ==
In September 1997, the estate announced that Versace's brother, Santo, would serve as the new CEO of Gianni Versace S.p.A. while Versace's sister, Donatella, would become the new head of design.

In his will, Versace left 50% of his fashion empire to his niece, Allegra Versace. She and her younger brother, Daniel, inherited Versace's rare artwork collection. Allegra inherited her stake, worth approximately $500 million, when she turned 18 in 2004.

== Filmography ==
Versace was involved in numerous film projects.

=== Actor ===
- Spice World (1997) – Scenes were deleted because of his death before the premiere
- Catwalk (a 1996-released documentary filmed in 1993)
- VH1 Fashion and Music Awards (1995, film)
- Look (1994, television show)

=== Costume designer, costume and wardrobe ===
- A Life Less Ordinary (1997, film) – costumes provider
- Ballet for life (1997, ballet)
- VH1 Fashion Awards (1997, television) – wardrobe
- The Pled (1996, film)
- John Baylor Time (1996, film) – special thanks
- Shakespeare Shorts (1996, TV series)
- Judge Dredd (1995, film)
- Magic of David Copperfield XVI: Unexplained Forces (1995, television) – costume designer
- Showgirls (1995, film) – other (Note: It has said /vərˈseɪs/ vər-SAYS in the movie instead of the correct pronunciation.)
- To Wong Foo, Thanks for Everything! Julie Newmar (1995) – special thanks
- Kika (1993, film) – costume designer
- Born Yesterday (1993, film) – wardrobe
- Cin Cin, also known as A Fine Romance (1992, film) – costumes
- Once Upon a Crime (1992, film) – wardrobe
- Vacanze di Natale, also known as Christmas Vacations (1991, film)
- Crystal or Ash, Fire or Wind, as Long as It's Love (1989, film) – costumes
- 24 Nights (1991, concert film) – wardrobe
- Hard to Kill (1990, film) – wardrobe
- Miami Vice (1989, TV series)

=== Production designer ===
- Elton John Live in Barcelona (1992, video documentary)

== Awards and tributes ==
- Versace was awarded the American Fashion Oscar on 1 February 1993 at the council's annual awards ceremony.
- President of the Italian Republic Francesco Cossiga conferred the decoration of Commendatore della Repubblica Italiana on him on 24 January 1986.
- Elton John dedicated his 1997 album The Big Picture to Versace.
- In July 2007, a specially written ballet was performed in La Scala, Milan, to mark the 10th anniversary of the fashion designer's death. Thanks Gianni, With Love was put together by French choreographer Maurice Béjart, for whom Versace designed many stage costumes.
- In 2009, the Russian Versace fan club was founded. There are 1,500 members (July 2012). The fan club is known for its lectures, excursions and actions dedicated to Gianni Versace. The staff of the club is situated in St. Petersburg, Russia.
- He received the America Award in memory from the Italy–USA Foundation in 2017.

== In popular culture ==
- The second season of the American drama series American Crime Story is subtitled The Assassination of Gianni Versace and revolves around the lead-up to and aftermath of Versace's murder. Versace is played by Venezuelan actor Édgar Ramírez.
- In an episode of the Irish sitcom Father Ted, one of the main characters, Fr Dougal McGuire, refers to Versace's death by saying, "God, Ted, do you remember that fella who was so good at fashion they had to shoot him?"
- Eminem makes references to Versace's murder and his homosexuality in the song "Criminal" (the closing song on his 2000 album The Marshall Mathers LP) through the lyrics "Hey, it's me, Versace! Whoops, somebody shot me! And I was just checkin' the mail. Get it? Checkin' the male?"

== See also ==
- List of fashion designers

== Notes ==
The character Nomi Malone (played by Elizabeth Berkley) mispronounces "Versace" as "Ver-sayce" (sounding like "Versace") in the 1995 cult classic film Showgirls.
