= Santo Versace =

Italian businessman and politician

Santo Versace BEconSc
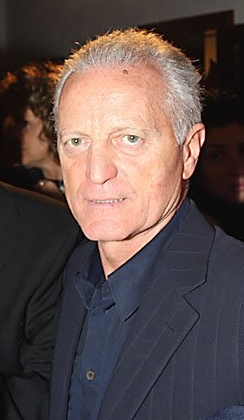

President of Gianni Versace S.p.A.
- Incumbent
- Assumed office 1978
- Preceded by: Office established

chief executive officer of Gianni Versace S.p.A.
- In office 1997–2004 Serving with Donatella Versace and Jorge Saud
- Preceded by: Gianni Versace
- Succeeded by: Allegra Beck

Member of the Chamber of Deputies for Calabria
- In office 14 April 2008 – 25 February 2013
- Preceded by: Ferdinando Adornato
- Succeeded by: Ferdinando Adornato

President of the National Assembly for the Act to Stop the Decline
- In office 25 May 2014 – 25 May 2015
- Preceded by: No immediate predecessor
- Succeeded by: Michele Boldrin

Member of the Parliamentary Commission for Finance
- In office 7 October 2011 – 14 March 2013

Member of the Parliamentary Commission for Trade, Tourism and Productive Activities
- In office 21 May 2008 – 7 October 2011

Personal details
- Born: Santo Domenico Versace; 16 December 1944 (age 81) Reggio Calabria, Italy
- Party: Act to Stop the Decline (2014–2015); Previous affiliations; Alliance for Italy (2009–2014); People of Freedom (until 2009)
- Relatives: Gianni Versace (brother); Donatella Versace (sister); Allegra Versace (niece)
- Education: University of Messina (BEconSc; 1968)
- Profession: Businessman; politician

Santo Domenico Versace (Italian: [ˈsanto doˈmeːniko verˈsaːtʃe]; (Note: According to a January 2018 Vogue interview with Donatella Versace, Versace is correctly pronounced /vərˈsɑːtʃeɪ/ vər-SAH-chay in English as opposed to the popular pronunciation of /vərˈsɑːtʃi/ vər-SAH-chee.) born 16 December 1944) is an Italian businessman and politician who is the president and co-chief executive officer of Gianni Versace SpA, based in Milan, Italy. Since 2008 he has been elected as Member of the Chamber of Deputies of the Italian Republic in the constituency of Calabria. He is a member of the Alliance for Italy political party, and a former member of The People of Freedom.

== Biography ==
=== Early life ===
He was born on 16 December 1944 in Reggio Calabria, where he grew up with his younger siblings Gianni and Donatella, along with their father, Antonio, and dressmaker mother, Francesca. An older sister, Tina, died at the age of twelve from an improperly treated tetanus infection. By age six, Versace joined his father as he continued to work after school and during summer until he attended university. When he was not in school, he helped take care of his younger sister, Donatella. Like his brother Gianni, he attended Reggio Calabria's Liceo Classico Tommaso Campanella, where he studied Latin and Ancient Greek.

=== Personal life ===
In 1981, Versace married Christiana Ragazzi. The couple had two children, Francesca Christiana and Antonio Tina Santo. The marriage ended in divorce in 2004. Versace remarried in 2014 to lawyer Francesca de Stefano.

=== Career and professional life ===
In 1968, Santo graduated from the University of Messina with a degree in economics. He began working first as a banker in Reggio Calabria for Credito Italiano and later as a high school teacher of economics and geography. In 1972, he completed his military service as an officer in the "Genova Cavalleria." Upon completion of his service, Santo opened his own accounting office in both Reggio Calabria and Milan.

In 1976, he moved permanently to Milan where he began working full-time with his brother. Gianni Versace SpA was founded in 1977, with Santo Versace as CEO until 2004. Santo played a leading role in the success of the Versace brand by focusing on communication, organization, productivity, and quality. He oversaw all areas of the business—including sales, distribution, production and finance—and quickly became one of the industry's leading and most well-respected businesspeople.

In 1998, Santo was appointed president of the Italian Fashion Chamber where he served from 1998 to 1999.

Since 1998 he is a shareholder of Viola Reggio Calabria Basketball. From June 1998 to October 1999 was "President of the National Chamber of Italian Fashion." He is Chairman of Operation Smile Italy Onlus, an association of doctors and volunteers which deals with children with facial deformities in 70 countries around the world.

In 2019 he set up the Fondazione Santo Versace, a charity that supports humanitarian work both in Italy and abroad.

== In popular culture ==
Versace is portrayed by Italian actor Giovanni Cirfiera in the second season of the anthology series American Crime Story, which premiered on 17 January 2018.
