= Allegra Versace =

Italian American heiress and socialite

- Born: Allegra Versace Beck; 30 June 1986 (age 40); Milan, Italy
- Education: Sir James Henderson School; Brown University; UCLA
- Occupations: Socialite, director of Gianni Versace S.p.A., theatrical dresser
- Known for: Heiress; Businesswoman; Socialite
- Mother: Donatella Versace
- Relatives: Santo Versace (uncle); Gianni Versace (uncle)
- Website: versace.com

Allegra Versace Beck (Italian pronunciation: [alˈleːɡra verˈsaːtʃe ˈbɛk]; born 30 June 1986), commonly known as Allegra Versace, is an Italian-American heiress and socialite. Since 2011, Allegra has been a director of Gianni Versace S.p.A. and has worked in New York City as a theatrical dresser.

== Early life and education ==
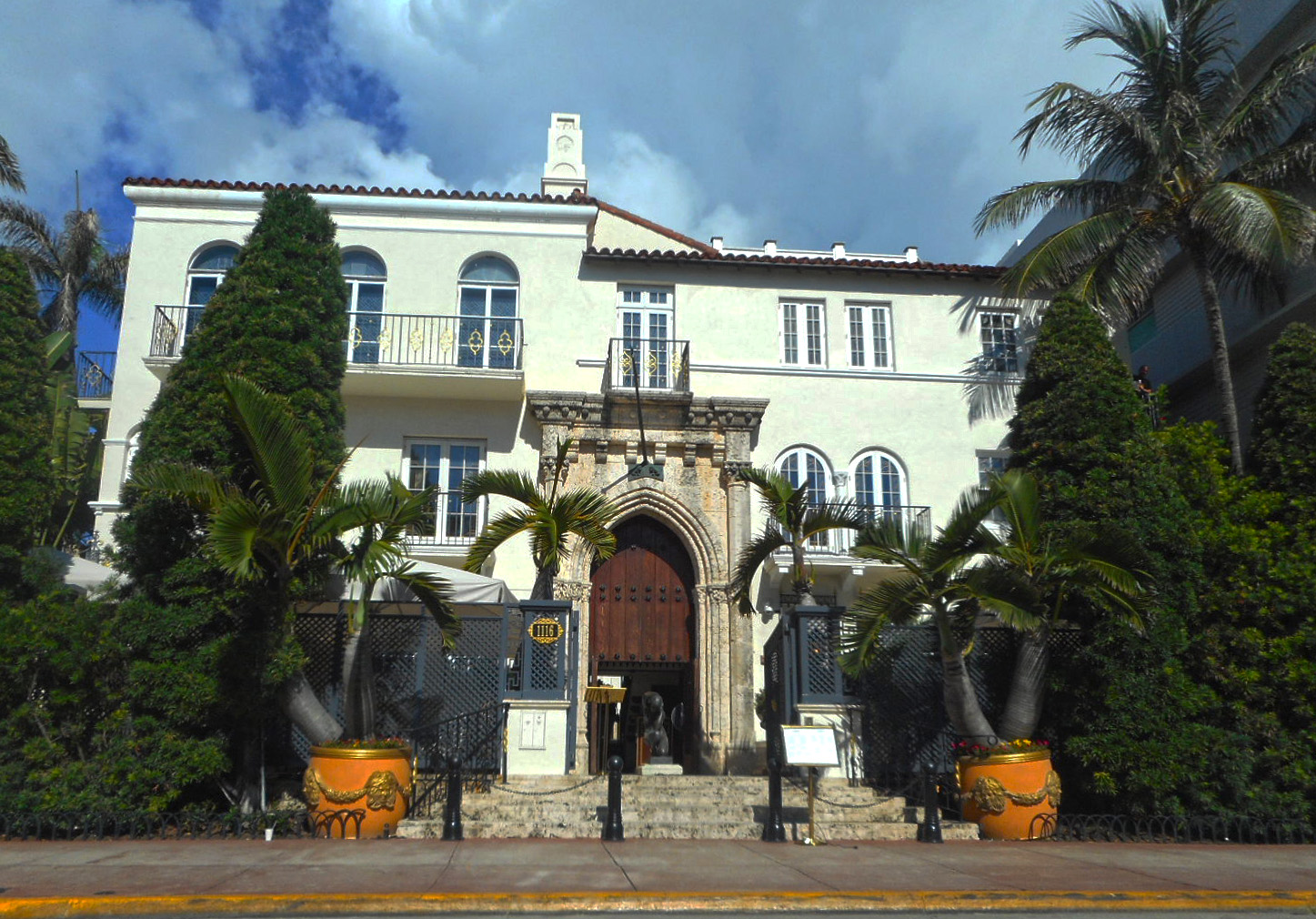
Casa Casuarina, Ocean Drive, Architectural District, Miami Beach, Florida.

Allegra Versace is the daughter of Italian fashion designer Donatella Versace and American ex-fashion model Paul Beck, and the niece of fashion designer Gianni Versace. She was raised outside Milan, Italy, with her younger brother Daniel. Sir Elton John gave her a piano that she admits she never learned to play. As a child, she took ballet classes for nine years and is to this day a huge admirer of ballet. She credits her uncle Gianni as having instilled in her this lifelong passion for ballet. For one of her birthdays, he introduced her to Maurice Béjart.

Versace attended The British School of Milan, then known as "The Sir James Henderson School", where she was tightly guarded. Following the completion of secondary education, she went abroad, first to Brown University in Rhode Island, then in 2006, she enrolled at UCLA, where she studied French, art history, and theatre.

== Inheritance of Versace ==
Allegra Versace was eleven years old when her uncle Gianni Versace was fatally shot outside his Miami mansion in July 1997. Her mother immediately sought counseling for her. On her 18th birthday, she received 50% ownership of Gianni Versace S.p.A. Allegra's uncle Santo Versace already owned 30% of the fashion empire, and her mother already owned 20%, but due to a long-standing disagreement between the two, the remaining 50% of the Versace empire was bequeathed by Gianni to Allegra. Allegra instantly became worth hundreds of millions of dollars. Despite legally being able to claim full control of her inheritance at the age of 18, she opted to focus entirely on her studies and did not begin real participation in the business of Versace until she was 24.

== Personal life ==
She has struggled with anorexia nervosa.
