= Versace =

Italian luxury fashion house in Milan

Gianni Versace S.r.l.
- Logo since 1997

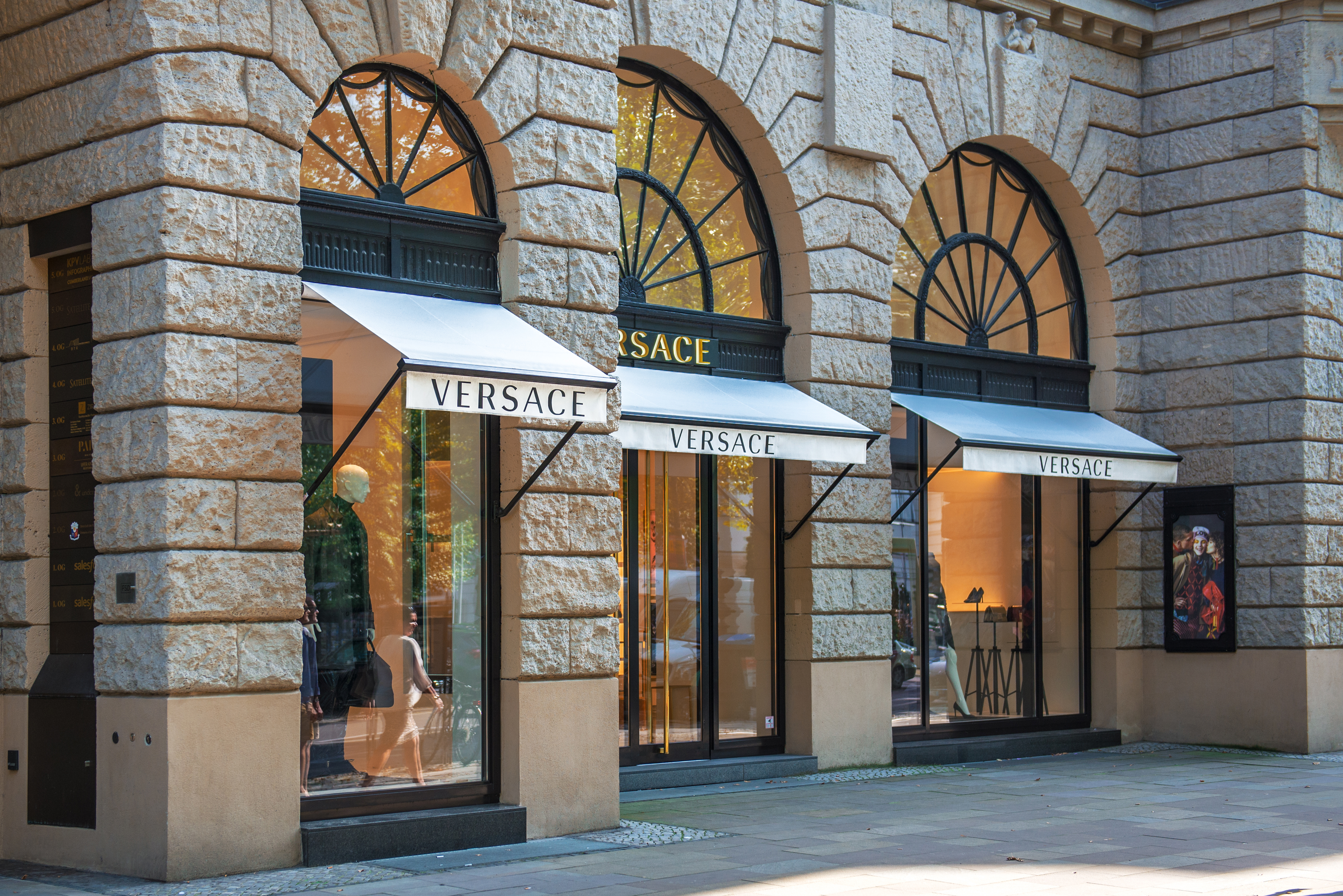
- Versace store in Berlin
- Type: Subsidiary
- Industry: Fashion
- Founded: 1978; 48 years ago, as Gianni Versace Donna
- Founder: Gianni Maria Versace
- Headquarters: Piazza Luigi Einaudi, 4; 20124 Milan; Italy; 45.48306°N 9.19502°E
- Key people: Santo Versace (chairman, president); Emmanuel Gintzburger (director, CEO); Donatella Versace (Brand Ambassador); Pieter Mulier (artistic director)
- Products: Ready-to-wear; haute couture; leather accessories; footwear
- Revenue: ▲€1.7 billion (2017); €635 million (2013)
- Number of employees: 1500
- Parent: Prada
- Website: versace.com

Former Versace logo; the Medusa emblem is still used in the complete version of the newer logo

Gianni Versace S.r.l. (Italian: [ˈdʒanni verˈsaːtʃe]), usually referred to as Versace (/vərˈsɑːtʃeɪ/ vər-SAH-chay), (Note: According to a January 2018 Vogue interview with Donatella Versace, Versace is correctly pronounced /vərˈsɑːtʃeɪ/ vər-SAH-chay in English as opposed to the popular pronunciation of /vərˈsɑːtʃi/ vər-SAH-chee.) is an Italian luxury elite fashion company founded by Gianni Versace in 1978. It produces Italian-made ready-to-wear and accessories, as well as haute couture under its Atelier Versace brand and licenses its name and branding to Luxottica for eyewear.

Gianni Versace being a native of Calabria, in the ancient Magna Graecia (Greater Greece), the company logo is inspired by Medusa, a figure from Greek mythology.

The brand was founded in 1978 by Gianni Versace and run after his death by his family: his brother Santo Versace and sister Donatella Versace while Donatella's daughter, Allegra Versace Beck, became the controlling shareholder having inherited her uncle Gianni's share. Her brother Daniel inherited much of his uncle's art collection.

In January 2019, four months after being sold to the Michael Kors Limited group, Gianni Versace S.r.l. became part of the Capri Holdings group for $2.12 billion, creating a new luxury group together with Kors and Jimmy Choo, keeping Donatella Versace as head of creative design.

On December 2, 2025, the Prada group completed the acquisition of the Italian firm for US$1.375 billion.

In February 2026, Pieter Mulier, formerly creative director of Alaïa, was announced as the chief creative officer of Versace.

== History and operations ==
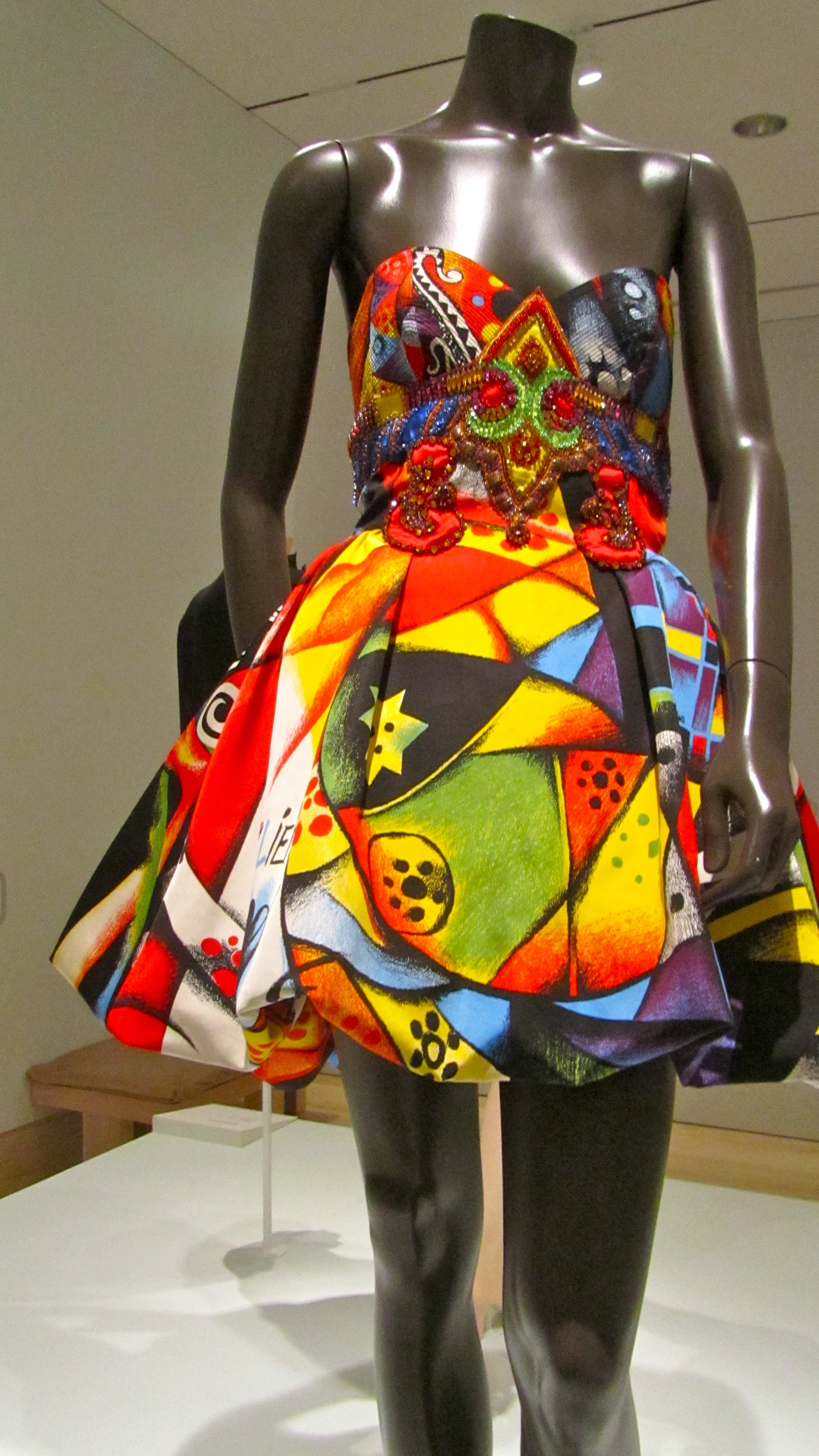
A dress by Gianni Versace

=== Gianni Versace, the beginning ===
Gianni Versace worked from an early age alongside his mother in the family tailor's shop until 5 February 1972. On that day, he left Reggio Calabria to move to Milan, where he initially designed collections for Florentine Flowers. Later that year, he collaborated with De Parisini di Santa Margherita, and his name began to circulate in fashion circles.

In 1976, Gianni's older brother, Santo Versace, who had an economics and business degree and an office in Messina, joined him in Milan. Together with Claudio Luti, they decided to open a company bearing Gianni's name. By March 1978, the first Versace collection was showcased at La Permanente in Milan, garnering great appreciation.

=== Gianni Versace, 1978–1997 ===
In 1972, Gianni Versace designed his first collections for Callaghan, Genny, and Complice.

In 1978, the company launched under the name "Gianni Versace Donna" and opened its first boutique in Milan's Via della Spiga. Gianni independently controlled much of the brand, from designing to retailing. In 1981, the House of Versace released their first-ever fragrance, Gianni Versace for Women. In 1982, the company expanded its offerings to include accessories, jewelry, home furnishings, and china.

In 1993, Donatella Versace added the Young Versace and Versus lines, and from 1994 the company began referring to her as co-designer for Gianni Versace. Also in 1994, the brand gained international coverage from the black Versace dress of Elizabeth Hurley, referred in the media as "that dress".

Versace has designed for various music artists, including stage and album cover costumes for Elton John in 1992 and outfits for Michael Jackson. Versace also designed clothing for the Princess of Wales and Princess Caroline of Monaco.

=== Donatella Versace, 1997–2025 ===
After the murder of Gianni Versace in 1997, his sister Donatella, formerly vice-president, took over as creative director, and his older brother Santo Versace became CEO. Donatella's daughter Allegra Versace was left a 50 percent stake in the company, which she assumed control of on her eighteenth birthday.

In 2000, the green Versace dress worn by Jennifer Lopez at the Grammy Awards gained extensive media attention. The dress was voted the fifth most iconic dress of all time and Elizabeth Hurley's black Versace dress was voted most iconic dress of all time, according to a 2008 Daily Telegraph poll.

In 2000, Versace began its effort to take control of all aspects of producing and selling its merchandise. With the company's profits in decline in the early 2000s, Fabio Massimo Cacciatori was hired as interim CEO to reorganise and restructure Versace Group in 2003. Cacciatori resigned in December 2003 due to "disputes with the Versace family". In 2004, Giancarlo di Risio from IT Holding became CEO, until he resigned in 2009 due to disagreements with Donatella. In May 2016, the Versace Group appointed Jonathan Akeroyd as CEO and board member.

In February 2014, The Blackstone Group purchased a 20 percent stake in Versace for €210 million.

In September 2018, Michael Kors offered to buy Versace for two billion euros. Versace announced all Blackstone and Versace family shares were sold to Michael Kors Limited. The acquisition was completed in December 2018, with Donatella Versace remaining head of creative design. In January 2019, Gianni Versace S.r.l. joined Capri Holdings, forming a new global fashion luxury group alongside Michael Kors and Jimmy Choo.

In 2018, Versace stopped using fur in its products and in 2020 announced it would stop using kangaroo leather. In October 2018, Versace announced its first Pre-Fall season show in New York, scheduled on Gianni Versace's 2 December birthdate. In 2021, Versace opened its first SoHo, New York boutique.

=== Dario Vitale, 2025 ===
In March 2025, Versace announced the appointment of Dario Vitale to Chief Creative Officer. Donatella Versace will remain with the brand, as Chief Brand Ambassador, and will focus on philanthropic endeavors.

In September 2025, Vitale presented his debut and only collection for Spring Summer 2026.

Around the time of Vitale's appointment, Il Sole 24 Ore and Reuters reported that Capri Holdings had put Versace up for sale and given Prada preferential access, ahead of other potential suitors, to the company's financial data. By April 2025, Prada announced it was buying Versace for 1.25 billion euros ($1.38 billion) from Capri.

By December 2025, Prada completed the acquisition of Versace, and Versace announced Vitale's exit a few days after. With the transaction, Prada, which also included Miu Miu, strengthened its position against rivals such as LVMH, while former owner Capri Holdings used the proceeds from the sale to reduce its debt. Prada's management said that Versace held significant long-term potential.

=== Pieter Mulier, 2026- ===
In February 2026, Versace announced Pieter Mulier would be the next Chief Creative Officer. He will be taking the position on July 1, 2026.

== Brands ==
=== Atelier Versace ===
As an Italian house, Versace is a correspondent member of the Chambre Syndicale de la Haute Couture.

In 2004, the brand decided to pull couture off the runway for the first time and, for several years, invited only editors to see the clothes on racks. In 2012, Versace returned to the couture schedule, only to halt its couture shows again from 2017, announcing their couture collections only through photo books posted on their website.

On March 5, 2026, Prada Group announced that Atelier Versace will return to the Paris Fashion Week couture schedule starting in 2027.

=== Versace Classic V2 ===
From 1990 Versace held a majority stake in VeZe, a joint venture company with Ermenegildo Zegna. From 1996, VeZe manufactured the Versace Classic V2 men's and women's wear diffusion lines. In 2004, the company decided to cancel the Versace Classic women's collection and replace the men's line with a higher-positioned brand known as Versace Collezioni.

=== Versace Jeans Couture ===
In 2009 Versace entered into a licensing agreement with Gruppo Facchini for the young line Versace Jeans Couture starting with the spring/summer 2010 season. Under the agreement, Gruppo Facchini manufactured and distributed the brand's apparel and accessories collections for men and women.

Since 2014, Versace Jeans Couture has been the brand's only diffusion line, following the merger of Versus Versace, Versace Jeans, Versace Collection, and all other sub-brands into one. It was licensed to Swinger International.

In 2026, Prada Group announced that it plans to discontinue Versace Jeans Couture entirely and not have any diffusion lines for Versace.

== Collaborations ==
- In 2006, Gianni Versace S.r.l. collaborated with Lamborghini to produce the Lamborghini Murciélago LP640 Versace. The car included a Versace-designed white satin interior with Versace's logo embroidered into the seats. The car was available in black or white and came with a luggage set, driving shoes, and driving gloves. Only ten units were produced.

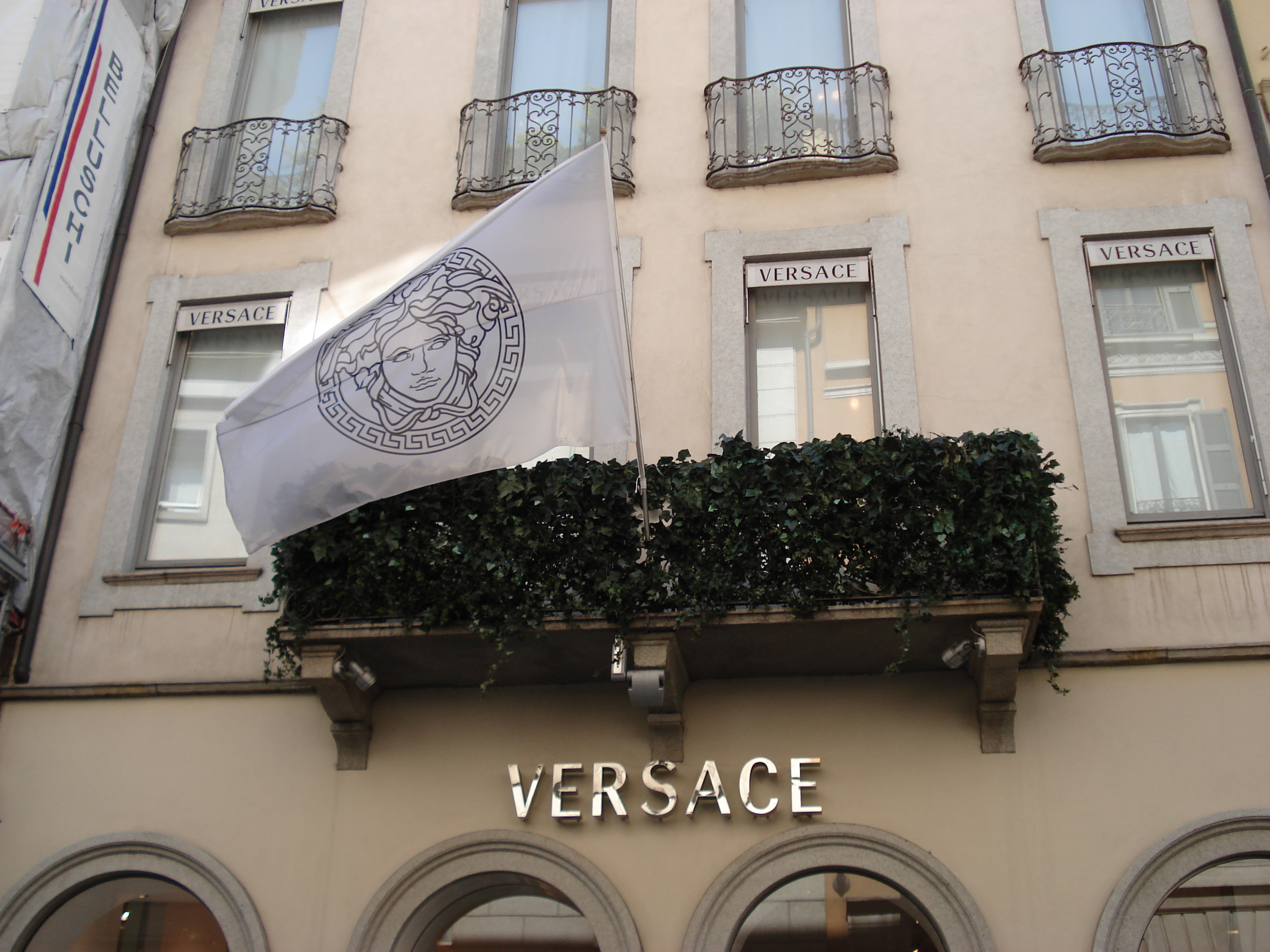
The Versace boutique in Milan, Italy

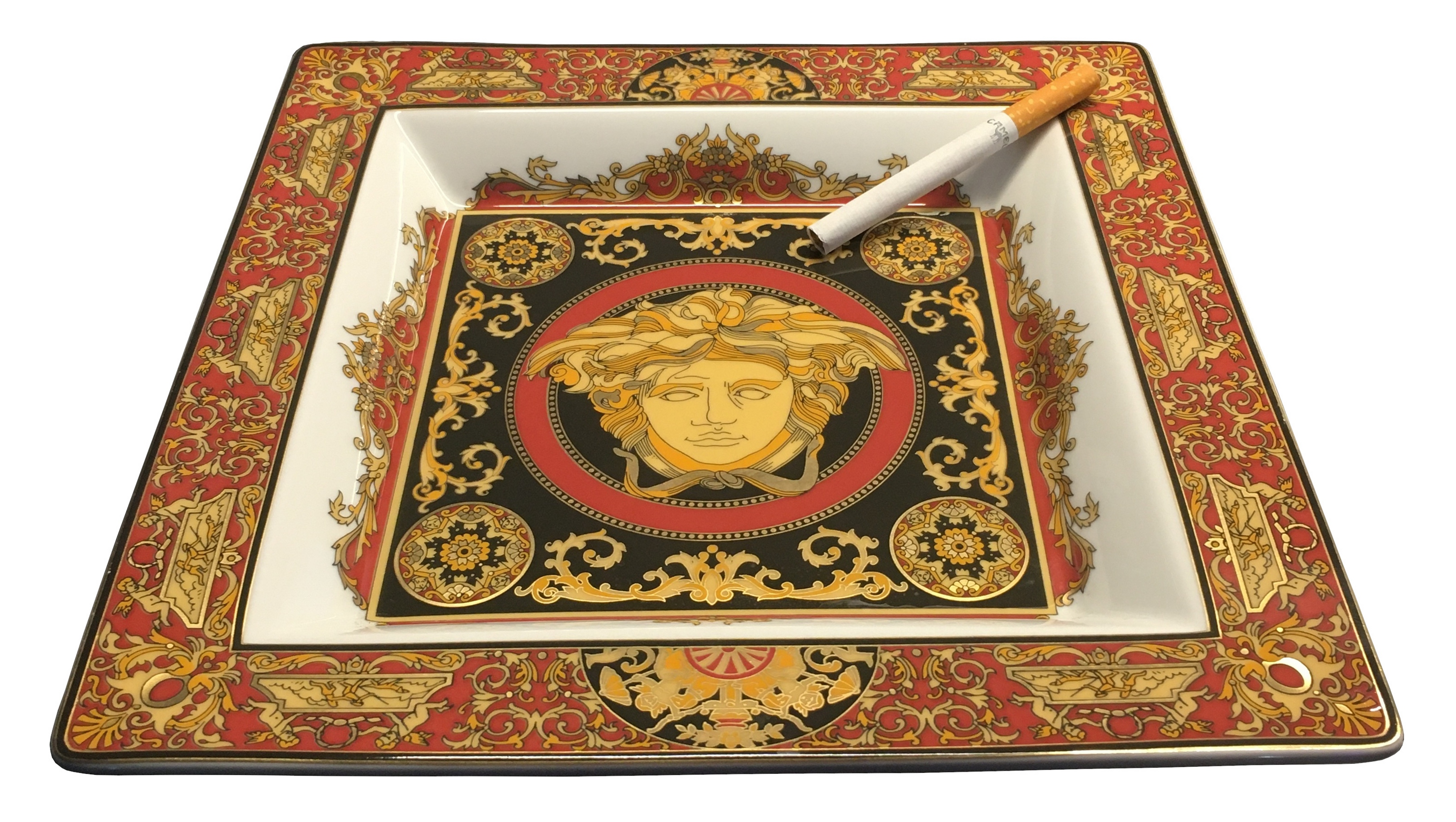
Ashtray (22 cm × 22 cm) designed by Versace and produced by German porcelain company Rosenthal

- In 2008, Versace collaborated with AgustaWestland to create the AgustaWestland AW109 Grand Versace VIP luxury helicopter, including a Versace leather interior and Versace-designed exterior.
- In 2009, Versace and H&M released a new line for H&M's stores, including men's and women's clothing and home items, such as pillows and blankets.
- In 2015, Versace collaborated with dancer Lil Buck to release a line of sneakers.
- In 2015, Donatella Versace was featured in Riccardo Tisci's Givenchy campaign.
- In 2018, Ronnie Fieg and Donatella Versace debuted their Kith x Versace collection, featuring a modified medusa logo with "KITH" written over its eyes.
- In 2019, Versace collaborated with Turkish Airlines to provide amenity kits to business class passengers on long-haul flights. The kits came in separately styled bags for men and women and featured the Versace Eros line of products for men and Versace Eros pour Femme products for women.
- Versace Men's Fall 2019 collection featured several items with the logo of Ford Motor Company. According to the fashion house, the two companies joined forces to channel "the excitement of buying your first car."
- In September 2021, Versace presented a joint fashion show with Fendi, titled "The Swap", consisting of two collections: Fendi's vision for Versace and Versace's vision for Fendi. This marked the first time two artistic directors of brands in different fashion groups designed collections for each other.
- In 2021, Versace collaborated with Lady Gaga to celebrate Born This Way's tenth anniversary by creating a capsule collection, with proceeds benefiting the Born This Way Foundation.
- In 2023, Versace and Dua Lipa collaborated to produce a women's collection called 'La Vacanza' which includes beachwear-inspired designs. It was planned to be unveiled and presented at the Cannes Film Festival on 23 May 2023 and to be available for delivery immediately after the festival.

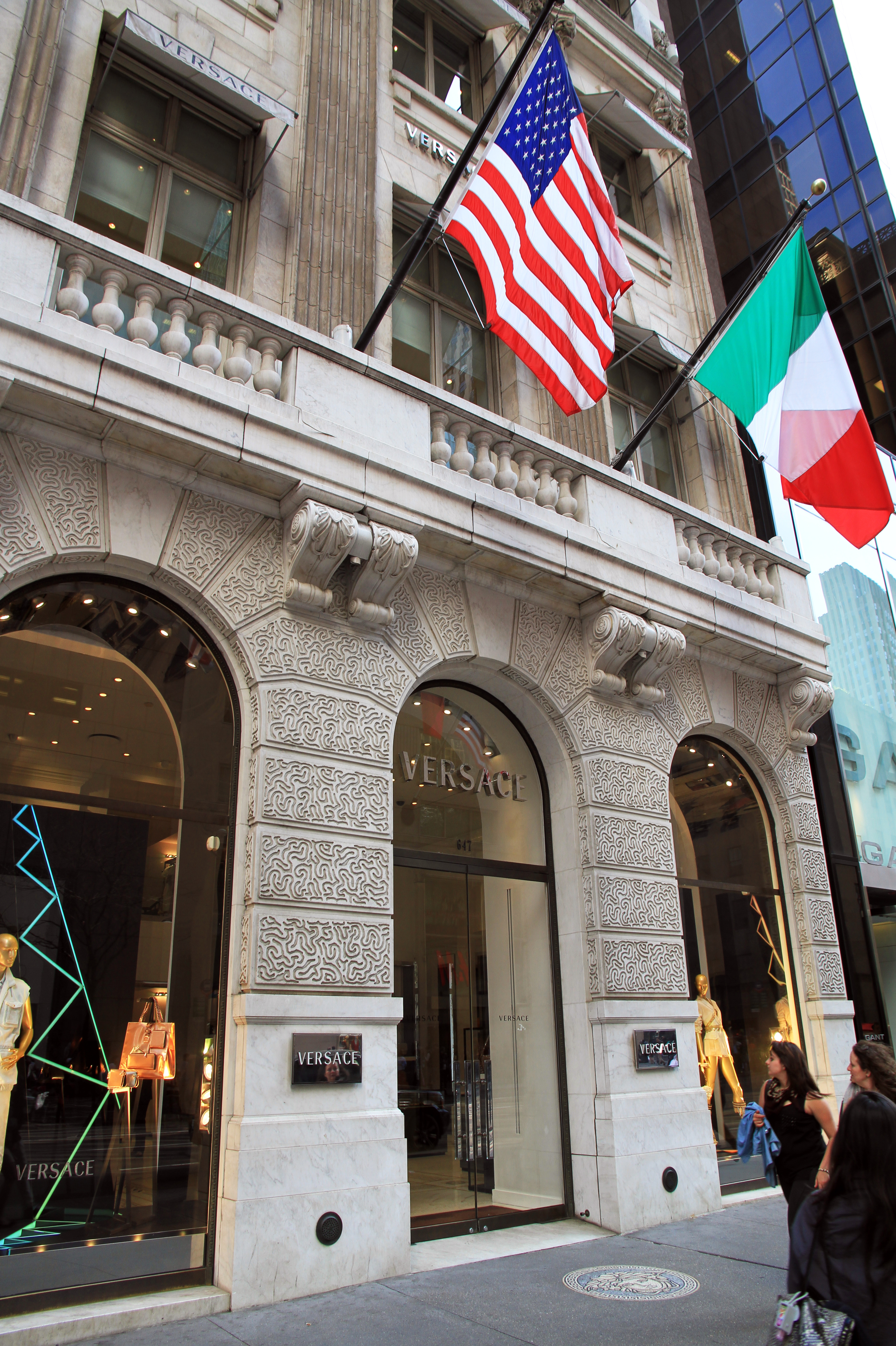
647 Fifth Avenue location, New York City, 2013

== Testimonials ==
=== Celebrity endorsements ===
Versace has always counted important public figures and celebrities among its clients. Between 1980 and 1983, Loretta Goggi was the first Italian artist to flaunt outfits signed by Gianni Versace, which she wore on many public and television occasions. Elton John, who has a strong connection to the Versace family, has consistently worn Versace, just as Lady Diana often wore the designer's clothing after her separation from Prince Charles. Lady Diana shared a close friendship with Gianni Versace and relied on him for various events. The same goes for Naomi Campbell, whose friendship with Versace began in the '90s when he spotlighted her as part of the "supermodel vogue" movement, alongside Linda Evangelista and Christy Turlington. Other celebrities who have worn Versace at public events include Beyoncé, Kim Kardashian, Cindy Crawford (who famously wore a red Versace dress to the 1991 Academy Awards), Elizabeth Hurley (who wore the famous Safety Pin Dress in 1994 to the premiere of Four Weddings and a Funeral), and Jennifer Lopez (who wore the iconic Jungle Dress).

In July 2011, Lady Gaga exclusively wore vintage outfits, garments from the latest collection, and accessories from the brand for an entire month. She also donned a Versace ensemble in the music video for "The Edge of Glory".

=== Brand ambassadors ===
Versace's brand ambassadors have included Hyunjin (since 2023) Zhao Lusi (since 2023), Ningning (since 2024), Cillian Murphy (since 2024), Anne Hathaway, Cai Xukun (since 2024), and Ding Yuxi (since 2025).

=== Advertising campaigns ===
Notable figures who have lent their image to Versace's advertising campaigns include Madonna (in 1995 and 2005), Ashton Kutcher, Kevin Richardson, Demi Moore, Britney Spears, Christina Aguilera, Patrick Dempsey, Jonathan Rhys Meyers, the musical group The Corrs, Halle Berry, Lady Gaga (in 2014), and Channing Tatum (in 2024). The brand has been working with several high-profile photographers for its advertisement campaigns, including Richard Avedon, Steven Meisel (1995), Mert Alas and Marcus Piggott (2011, 2014) and Bruce Weber (2016).

== Other activities ==
=== Interior design ===
Versace was one of the first fashion houses to launch home interiors in 1992, first focused on textiles and later porcelain tableware collections in collaboration with Rosenthal. After having previously manufactured internally, Versace entered into an licensing agreement in 2020 with Lifestyle Design Group, the Italian home design division of Haworth Group, to produce and distribute the Versace Home furniture.

=== Palazzo Versace ===
Soheil Abedian, of Sunland Group, approached Versace in 1997, proposing a luxury hotel built for the Versace brand. The first Palazzo Versace opened on Australia's Gold Coast on 15 September 2000. The hotel was sold to a Chinese consortium in December 2012. The second Palazzo, the Palazzo Versace Dubai, was completed in December 2015 and is located on the foreshore of Dubai Creek. A third Palazzo, the Palazzo Versace Macau, is under construction as part of a partnership with Macau's largest casino operator SJM Holdings. The Palazzo Versace hotels are the world's first fashion-branded hotels.

=== Real estate ===
In 2015, Versace partnered with Mind Group. The companies designed luxury residential towers in China called the Versace Residencies. The goal of the creators was to combine Versace's luxury home elements with elements of traditional Chinese culture.

Also in 2015, Versace partnered with the ABIL Group in India to develop another luxury residential project, located in South Mumbai.

Further developments include designing interiors for the Damac Tower in Vauxhall, London.

=== Watches and jewelry ===
In 2004, Versace sold its Swiss watch subsidiary Versace SA for an undisclosed price to Timex. The subsidiary was renamed Vertime SA and initially held an eight-year license to produce Versace-brand watches, jewelry and writing instruments.

=== Sunglasses ===
Since 2003, Versace has been licensing the development, production and worldwide distribution of sunglasses and prescription frames under its Versace brand to Luxottica.

== Operations ==
As of 2016, more than 1500 boutiques operate worldwide; the first boutique outside of Italy opened in the Italian Centre, Glasgow, Scotland, in 1991.

== Controversy ==
In August 2019, Versace produced a range of tops whose design featured a list of cities and countries, suggesting Hong Kong and Macau were countries separate from China. Versace apologized, saying it made a mistake in the design and would destroy the offending clothing. In response to the controversy, Yang Mi ended her relationship as brand ambassador for Versace.
