= Soheil Abedian =

Australian property developer

Soheil Abedian (b. 1949) is an Iranian-born Australian property developer notable for co-founding the Sunland Group and his philanthropy efforts. He has been awarded a Centenary Medal of Australia, been named the QCF Philanthropist of the year, presented with the Keys to the City of the Gold Coast, and awarded an Order of Australia Medal. He has also been involved in some controversies, being named in a Queensland Crime and Misconduct Commission report into Gold Coast Council elections and described as a consistently uncooperative witness in a Victorian Supreme Court case involving the Sunland Group.

== Biography ==
=== Establishment on the Gold Coast ===
Abedian was born in Khoramabad, Iran, in 1949 into a middle class family. As of 1970 he had moved to Austria where he had his first child and studied at the University of Graz graduating with a master's degree in architecture in 1979. In 1980 he went on holiday to Brisbane, Australia, and decided to make a trip to the Gold Coast during his visit and after returning to Austria he immediately made arrangements to immigrate to the city with his family. They arrived in 1981 with Abedian initially starting a business selling carpets with his brother Sep. Initially he intended to practice as an architect however he was not able to practice in Australia without undertaking further study.

In 1983 Abedian founded the Sunland Group company with his friend Foad Fathi and they began constructing luxury homes. The company quickly became successful, developing a luxury villa project in 1986 and its first high-rise development in 1987, and in 1992 it began a $2.5 million project constructing luxury homes at a waterfront estate on the Gold Coast, and in 1995 it became a publicly listed company registered with the Australian Securities Exchange. By 1997 Sunland was the largest developer on the Gold Coast, however it had a small public profile as Abedian had avoided media coverage and not prioritized public relations. As of 1997 development sites had become scarce in Surfers Paradise and Abedian announced he was pursuing development outside of the Gold Coast.

In 1997 Abedian decided to develop a luxury hotel themed around the fashion brand Versace and he secured a meeting with Gianni Versace himself although Versace was murdered before the meeting could take place. In August 1998 Abedian and his son, Sahba, met with Santo Versace in Milan and secured an agreement to build a Versace Hotel on the Gold Coast, although in August 1999 Abedian visited the United States and met with the Mayor of Miami to earmark potential sites for the Hotel. The Hotel was completed on the Gold Coast in September 2000 and opened at the same time as the opening of the Sydney Olympic Games on September 15.

As of 1999 Abedian had been appointed to the Gold Coast City Council's Heart of the City taskforce and that year he met with four other members of the taskforce and as a group they threatened to resign from the taskforce unless the Council invested $2 million in developing Surfer's Paradise. He harshly criticized the Council at a forum of business leaders in Surfers Paradise stating:

"Our council can’t make a decision, we have 14 independent councillors. They can hide behind anything and everything, they can shit on officers. Council doesn’t have a common vision for this time, they come before every election with new ideas."

In June 2001 Abedian decided to construct the 78 storey Q1 Tower as Sunland's next major project as a joint venture with GWA Ltd's Anderson family which was completed in 2005.

In 2006 a Queensland Crime and Misconduct Commission report revealed Abedian had made improper hidden donations in order to gain political favors during the 2004 Gold Coast Council election. In May 2006 his son, Sahba, now managing director of the company, announced that the Sunland Group would not make any more donations to individual councillors of the Gold Coast City Council after the reports release. In March 2006 Abedian met with James Packer who bought a 13.04 percent stake in the Sunland Group and joined the companies Board of Directors.

=== Dubai expansion ===
In late 2006 Sunland expanded abroad into Dubai and Abedian moved to Dubai to set up Sunland offices, secure designs planning and approvals for the companies projects in the country, and to supervise projects. As of November 2006 the Sunland Group had begun building White Bay, a planned community, and begun developing projects to construct a second Palazzo Versace Hotel and D1 Tower, as a sister project to the Q1 Tower, in Dubai under Abedian's leadership.

In 2007 Sunland made a property deal in Dubai which lead to company executive David Brown being placed under arrest with his passport being confiscated in 2009, and while Abedian's son, Sahba, initially claimed Brown was not being investigated it was later ruled that Sunland had misled the ASX three times by denying the investigation. Before the Victorian Supreme Court Abedian agreed that a bribery investigation into a senior executive would be market sensitive information but denied that any deceit had taken place and the judge commented: “Whilst Soheil denied his alleged ignorance of Brown being under investigation for bribery was to justify the ASX announcement, his denial cannot be considered an honest answer,". The case prompted James Packer to sell his stake in the company and resign from the board in August 2009 with Abedian later admitting that he demanded the company be liquidated as a result of the controversy. In 2010 a shareholder criticized Sunland's global diversification program for not expanding beyond Dubai and Abedian responded by saying:

"I’m really pissed off, I’m going to speak in Persian because my English is obviously not good enough ... It is paramount for you to understand that the Australian asset portfolio is totally separate to Dubai. The Dubai asset has independent management and board."

In June 2011 Abedian returned to Australia in order to become chairman of the Sunland Group due to the chairman at the time, Terry Jackman, resigning. Legal proceedings regarding the 2007 Dubai property deal continued in both Australian and Dubai courts with Sunland accusing employees of the company Nakheel of misleading them however in June 2012 the case was dismissed in the Supreme Court of Victoria with the judge describing Sunland's case as a fabrication stating that it was "simply implausible", that documents had been fabricated, and describing Abedian as a "consistently uncooperative witness".

The accused parties remained imprisoned in Dubai however in early 2013 Abedian denied making any claims against one of them, Marcus Lee, with Lee's lawyer commenting "It's all well and good for them to say now they think he’s innocent but that's not what they said to authorities in Dubai," Former Prime Minister of Australia Malcolm Fraser criticized Abedian saying "If Sunland had nothing to fear, why won't their people go back to Dubai as they've been subpoenaed to do?", with Abedian responding by stating that "Anybody who knows me, they will say that my whole being is about righteousness," . In November 2013 the parties accused by Sunland were also acquitted in Dubai court, with the judge stating that the evidence provided by Sunland was "contrary to fact."

During the proceedings Liberal National Party member Stuart Robert gave a speech before the Australian Parliament written by Sunland Group lobbyist Simone Holzapfel and it later came to light that Abedian had personally donated $12,500 to the Party prior and an additional $25,000 from personal and company funds over 2014 and 2015, resulting in the Labor Party criticizing Robert and describing the situation as a "cash for comment" deal.

=== Recent years ===
In 2011, after his return to Australia, Abedian criticized mayoral candidates in the Gold Coast mayoral election for focusing on trying to secure the Commonwealth Games for the Gold Coast instead of developing Surfers Paradise saying:

"None of you has given any solution on how to go forward, everyone points to 2018 as that is when the return of Christ will come. Let’s start with very small steps. We know the problem. It’s not Coomera or Nerang, it’s the heart of the city. It’s in the heart of the city (Surfers Paradise) where my family are afraid to walk.”

He also described the city as dead, accused the council of allowing the city to be "hijacked" by drunks, criminals, and "low-cost tourists", and criticized the council for not investing more money into development causing property development companies to go bankrupt. Gold Coast mayor Ron Clarke dismissed Abedian's concerns noting he had not lived in the city for some time.

In 2012 a talk given by Joe Hockey and Tim Nicholls which was related to Liberal National Party fundraising vehicle Platinum Circle was hosted at Sunland's Palazzo Versace Hotel on the Gold Coast and in 2013 Abedian personally donated $3500 to Liberal National Party fundraising vehicle Platinum Circle, although in 2015 he publicly criticized the Tony Abbott governments tax policy calling for personal tax rates for those earning under $50,000 to be dropped to zero and for those earning over $1 million to be taxed at seventy-five percent.

In 2015 the Sunland Group began attempting to secure approval to build two forty-four story towers on the Gold Coast Spit and Abedian began meeting with Gold Coast councillors in order to secure the council votes necessary to receive planning approval. In 2016 the development became a divisive issue in the Gold Coast Council election with the Save Our Spit Association protesting the development and mayoral candidate Gary Baildon having his transparency questioned during a mayoral debate as he had accepted $18,000 in donations from Sunland in 2004. In 2016 Abedian gave a talk as keynote speaker at a TSS Foundation breakfast whose attendees included Gold Coast council members at which he stated:

"For many of the so-called knowledgeable people, they have no clue about architecture, they have no clue about the future of the city, they do not understand how a new destination is going to emerge . . . They call me names and say, ‘Go back where you came from’ but I cannot because they would hang me. . . So one day if this goes ahead I will put out a sign for these associations, these Save Our Spit associations and the so-called architects who say they know something but they don’t know shit."

The company threatened to build a mediocre shopping centre if the towers were not approved later in 2016. As of September 2016 a special anti-corruption taskforce had been assigned to investigate links between Liberal MP Stuart Robert and the towers project in light of Sunland's lobbyist donating funds to a fundraising arm of the Liberal National Party which Robert used to donate $60,000 to candidates in the 2016 Gold Coast City Council elections, and the fact Robert had written a letter to the Gold Coast City Council urging them to support the project despite the city not being in his electorate. Media reports also raised the fact Abedian had made thousands of dollars in personal donations to the Liberal Party prior to Robert advising the Gold Coast City Council to support the Sunland development. In 2017 Abedian criticized the Queensland state Labor government for not approving the project saying:

"I hope one day our elected representatives put the party politics aside and think about how best they can serve the people. We are happy to approve mining that destroyed our environment and not to approve hotels that is the cleanest industry in the world . . ."

In October 2018 the Queensland State Government passed laws criminalizing property developers making political donations, however in 2019 concerns were raised in the Gold Coast Council that Abedian had made donations to a charity which the Mayoress of the Gold Coast was a director of. Similarly in 2005 Anne Jamieson, the General Manager for the Sunland Group, had been accused of threatening to withhold donations to the Mayoresses charity if the Gold Coast Council did not co-operate with the Sunland Group which she denied. Also in 2019 Gold Coast council member Hermann Vorster reported in the Council minutes that Abedian had said to him "I hope at the next election it will be proven you do not deserve to sit on the chair you occupy." reporting the encounter as a possible conflict of interest. Abedian then publicly criticized Vorster for pursuing re-election.

In 2020 Gold Coast Mayor Tom Tate awarded Abedian the Gold Coast keys to the city.

In December 2020 the Sunland Group announced it was planning to sell off its assets over a three year period in order to return funds to shareholders which was projected to result in Abedian making $130 million, and it was suggested the company would go private and potentially cease operations as a result. In January 2021 one of Sunland's sites was sold to the Arium Group, a company in which Abedian held an indirect interest and his son Sahba held a major interest, and in February it was reported that Abedian was already engaged in private property development in Miami through the private company Pacific Development Corporation which he co-owned with his son, Sahba, and daughter, Mona.

In June 2021 Abedian placed his residence of fifteen years, the penthouse of Lumiere tower, on the market as he was planning on relocating his residence to a Sunland Project on Hedges Avenue. The same month he was also awarded an Order of Australia Medal as part of the Queen's Birthday Honours for his service to the community and property development sector. In October 2021 the Sunland Group sold its last major project and announced it was winding down in 2023 and Abedian declined to comment on his future plans stating:

“What will happen in the future we cannot talk about until we finish this chapter and hopefully another chapter will begin,”

== Personal life ==
=== Philanthropy ===
Abedian is a member of the Baháʼí Faith and has delivered talks on the religion, and serves as a member of the Spiritual Assembly of the Gold Coast. He is also a partner of the Rays of Light Foundation, a Baháʼí inspired non-governmental organization based in Papua New Guinea.

He supports several philanthropic ventures notably making a large donation to Bond University in 2011 which resulted in construction beginning on the Soheil Abedian School of Architecture at the University, and in 2012 the Abedian Foundation was founded. He founded a Scholarship at Griffith University along with his wife Anne in 2016, and in 2018 Griffith awarded him an Honorary Doctorate.

In March 2020 he became chairman of the registered charity Serving Our People Inc. when it was founded.

=== Family ===
Abedian has a son, Sahba (b. 1978), who became a solicitor in 1998 and became company secretary of the Sunland Group that year. In 2000 he opened Sunland's Victorian operations and in 2002 became joint managing director of the company becoming sole managing director in 2006. In 2010 he became engaged to Gold Coast eye stylist Amy-Jean Linnehan however the engagement ended after a few months and he married Nava Moghbelpour in 2014. Sahba is an Auxiliary Board member, a high rank in the Baháʼí Faith.

He also has a daughter, Mona, who is married to Riaz Rezvani. Rezvani also works in property development and in December 2019 was alleged to have assaulted someone during a property related meeting which former Sunland Chairman Terry Jackman was present at with Jackman saying “I was absolutely amazed and thought it was an extraordinary thing to happen … disgraceful,”.

Abedian is currently married to Anne Jamieson and has a stepson, Tom Jamieson. The company the Australian Residential Corporation is co-owned by Soheil, his children Sahba and Mona, his stepson Tom, and his nephew Khian.
