= Middenbury House =

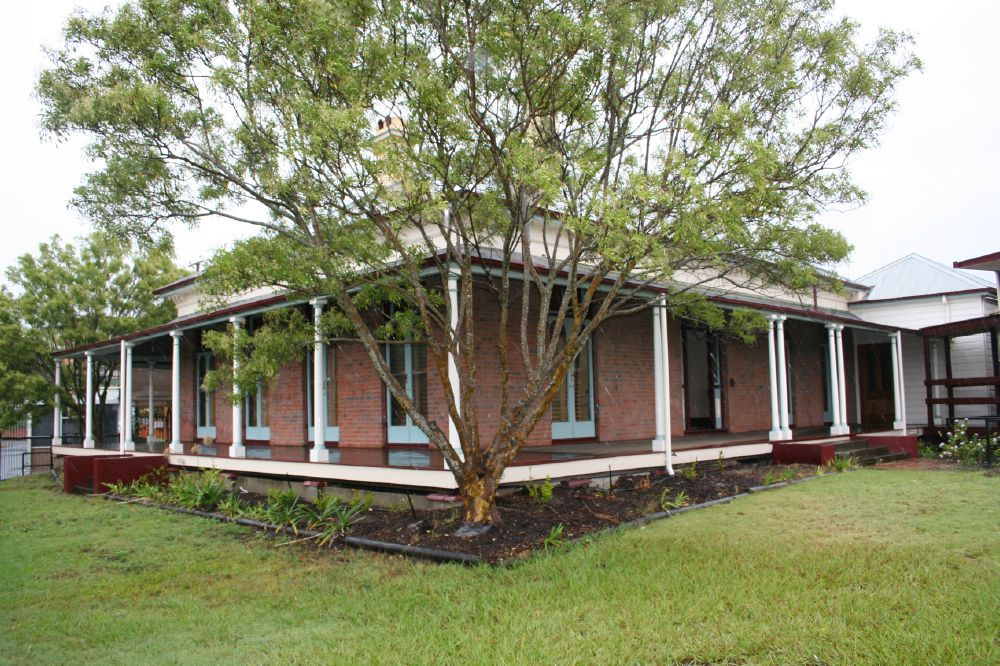
- Middenbury House, north-east corner, 2009

- Location within Queensland
- 27.4850°S 152.9950°E
- Location: 600 Coronation Drive, Toowong, City of Brisbane, Queensland, Australia

History
- Design period: 1840s–1860s (Mid-19th century)
- Built: 1860

Site notes
- Architectural style: Georgian

Queensland Heritage Register
- Official name: Middenbury
- Type: state heritage
- Designated: 18 July 2014
- Reference no.: 600330
- Type: Residential: Detached house
- Theme: Building settlements, towns, cities and dwellings: Dwellings

Middenbury House is a heritage-listed house at 600 Coronation Drive, Toowong, City of Brisbane, Queensland, Australia. It was built in 1866. It was added to the Queensland Heritage Register on 18 July 2014.

== History ==
Middenbury, a single-storeyed brick building, rectangular in plan and surrounded by verandahs on three sides, is located in Toowong on an elevated position on the Brisbane River. It was constructed in 1865 as a villa residence on land owned by Mrs Eliza Mary Rogers, who purchased the site of just over 6 acres (2.4 ha) in that year. Until 1956, the place was used a residence, with large grounds surrounding the house. Following acquisition of the property in 1957 by the Australian Broadcasting Company (ABC) the site was used for radio and television broadcasting, with Middenbury used primarily for office space.

Free settlement occurred in Brisbane, traditional country of the Yuggera and Turrbal people, from 1842. Land available for private ownership was progressively surveyed and offered for sale by the New South Wales Government (the separation of Queensland as an independent colony being in 1859) Land was categorized as either "town", within gazetted towns and villages, "suburban", within 5 miles (8.0 km) of town boundaries or "country", beyond this radius. Early settlement was largely focussed on town land on opposite sides of the river at North Brisbane and South Brisbane, while suburban areas, such as Toowong (then referred to as Milton or West Milton) developed more slowly.

Moggill Road was surveyed and named in 1849 (later known as River Road, then partly Coronation Drive). It was the first route to Ipswich constructed on the north side of the Brisbane River and was shorter than the Ipswich Road on the other side of the river. The land on which Middenbury was constructed was located along this road. From the early 1850s, land speculators increasingly acquired property in the Milton and Toowong area, much of it initially for agricultural purposes.

In July 1853 James Henderson, a manager of the Bank of Australasia in Sydney, purchased Portion 25, Parish of Enoggera, a parcel of over 16 acres (6.5 ha), dissected by the Moggill Road and fronting the Brisbane River. Henderson also purchased the adjacent Portion 26 and by 1860 had acquired around 400 acres (160 ha) between what is now Toowong and Indooroopilly. In 1865 surveyor and land agent James Warner (on behalf of Henderson) began advertising land parcels for sale in the "Village of Nona", a subdivision plan of most of Portions 25 and 26. The remainder of Portion 25, a parcel of just over 6 acres (2.4 ha) between Moggill Road and the river, was sold to Eliza Mary Rogers for £100 an acre, with the Certificate of Title registered in April 1865.

Born in 1797 at Rogate, in West Sussex, England, Eliza Mary Rogers (née Gardner) arrived in Australia in 1835 with her husband Richard Rogers, their three children Eliza Mary, Louisa Emily, Lewis Gardner and three children from Richard's first marriage, Edward, Richard and Anna Susan. Another child Frank was born in 1837. Richard Rogers was employed as Ordnance Storekeeper in Sydney and for a time was also Colonial Storekeeper. In 1850 he was transferred to Hobart and performed similar duties until his retirement in 1855. The Rogers' returned to Sydney and in 1863, Richard accidentally drowned in a shallow creek in their garden at their Darling Point residence "Springfield". Eliza Rogers' move from Sydney may have been influenced by her son Lewis Gardner (LG) living and working in Brisbane at this time. LG Rogers (b.1835) was appointed as a first class revenue clerk for the Queensland Treasury in 1862, a relatively high ranking and well paid position. It is uncertain when Eliza Rogers first came to Brisbane, but by February 1864 she was advertising for domestic servants in Milton.

Following the separation of Queensland in 1859, the first half of the 1860s was a period of strong growth for Brisbane in the newly established colony of Queensland. Immigration boosted the population dramatically (more than doubling between 1861 and 1864 to over 12,000) and many substantial public and private buildings were constructed during this time. The urban environment of Brisbane's fledgling town centre, where residential dwellings co-existed in close proximity with commercial and industrial activity, was characterised by congestion, noise, and poor sanitation, common among other developing towns and cities in mid-19th century Australia. During this period "villa estates", located in the suburban periphery in then semi-rural settings – on elevated locations such as along ridgelines, and in some instances with river frontage - became an increasingly popular type of dwelling for Brisbane's more affluent residents. This demographic included higher-ranking public servants, professionals and successful business people. The flight to residential villa estates by the well-to-do was a development pattern that occurred internationally during the Victorian era. Key elements of villa estates included large and comfortable houses, associated outbuildings such as servant's' quarters and stabling, expansive garden settings, and a good road to town.

While some early Brisbane suburban villa residences were located in relative isolation (such as St Johns Wood, in present-day Ashgrove), in other instances they were established in closer proximity, as occurred along the ridges and on the Brisbane River between Milton and Toowong. At the time of Eliza's Rogers' land purchase there were only a small number of residences in the area. Early substantial residences in the area included: Milton House c. 1853, built for retired chemist Ambrose Eldridge; "Minto", built for WLG Drew, Queensland's Auditor-General (1877–1889); "Dovercourt" (1864), the residence of architect William Ellerker; Moorland Villa (by 1862) for John Markwell, and Richard Langler Drew's "Karslake", later residence of early Toowong memoir writer John Bowden Fewings. This early pattern of suburban settlement can be seen as both a geographic and built expression of the emerging socio-economic structure in Brisbane.

In 1862 Richard Langler Drew bought and subdivided land on the outskirts of Brisbane, setting up a signboard: "This is the village of Toowong". However, closer suburban settlement did not occur in the area until the 1870s, spurred on by the arrival of the Main Line railway to Brisbane from Ipswich which passed through Toowong. By 1881 there 1275 people living in Toowong in 300 dwellings.

In March 1865, the Brisbane Courier noted, "substantial brick villas, instead of wooden houses are on the increase". A later article in September stated, "numerous villa residences have been erected during the past 12 months in the suburbs of the town...No greater proof of the prosperity of a city as a whole can be afforded than that derived from the disposition of its citizens to plant and build on its environs, and to make it their home socially as well as professionally...Scarcely a day passes but our advertising columns invite tenders for the erection of villa residences...".

The house was built for Eliza Mary Rogers and completed by December 1866. The design of Middenbury has been attributed to architect James Cowlishaw although there is no firm evidence of this. An October newspaper advertisement for villa sites on the Nona Estate noted their location next to the residence '"recently erected for L.G. Rogers, Esq."' indicating Middenbury was constructed at this time.

A 1984 conservation management plan describes Middenbury when it was completed:

"Middenbury...followed the detached villa pattern. The main part of the house was built in brick with a slate roof and was surrounded by verandahs on three sides. A large room, able to be divided by cedar folding doors, occupied the front of the house. Each end of this room was fitted with a cedar mantlepiece. The interior joinery was of cedar. The main door opened into a short hall which led from the verandah on the northern side into a long hall which extended through the centre of the house to a back verandah. It is believed that during the Rogers' occupancy of the house, one half of the large divided room at the east of the house was used as a dining room. The original breakfast room was situated behind the main entrance hall."

Middenbury took advantage of its elevated waterfront location, oriented to face a broad reach of the Brisbane River.

By June 1866, the house was known as "Middenbury". The source of the name has not been verified; one suggested link is the suburb of Midanbury, in Southampton, England, which took its name from a large house Middenbury, built in the 1700s. Both Lewis and Eliza Rogers' name appear in notices related to Middenbury from the time of its completion, and the house appears to have been used as residence by both members of the family. Middenbury was let out for a few months in both 1868 and 1869; at this time it was identified as the house of Eliza Rogers. In 1874, 1 rood 37.25 perches (1,954 m^{2}) of the Middenbury property was acquired by the Commissioner of Railways for the railway extension to Brisbane from Ipswich. An 1875 survey map conducted as part of this process shows Middenbury with verandahs on its northeast and southeast elevations, with the rear of the house flanked by service wings, and a building on the site of the stables.

After Rogers' death in 1875, the house was owned by her children and rented to a series of well-to-do tenants; in 1885 her son Frank subdivided the original 6 acres (2.4 ha) and retained the house and a little over 2.5 acres (1.0 ha). In 1891 it was bought by Tim O’Shea, a Brisbane merchant. His family owned the house until 1949; in 1920 they hosted the Prince of Wales, later King Edward VIII. They made various additions to the house, including an extension containing a bathroom and a study or additional bedroom, and a garage building with a room for a chauffeur, laid out a circular driveway, and created a tennis court in the garden.

After the death of Eliza Rogers at Middenbury in October 1875, the property passed to four of the Rogers siblings - Eliza (Jr), Louisa (Minnie), Lewis and Frank. Lewis Rogers died at Middenbury in December 1876, with his share in the property passing to his wife Frances Wyndowe Rogers (née Miles) whom he had married in 1867. In March 1877, Frank Rogers was advertising Middenbury for rental, "containing drawing, dining, 7 bedrooms, besides kitchen, laundry...coachhouse, stables, garden, and paddock, and every requisite for a gentleman's family". In the same month, much of the contents of Middenbury were put up for auction. The exhaustive list compiled for the auction reveals the affluent lifestyle of the Rogers' during their residency. In addition to the "superior household furniture", "culinary requisites" and items used by domestic staff, the family horse and carriage, milch cows, pigs and poultry were also offered for purchase.

A number of tenants are known to have occupied Middenbury from 1877 until its purchase by Timothy O'Shea in 1891. Thomas Finney, co-founder of the large Queensland retail firm of Finney, Isles and Co., lived with his family at Middenbury until mid-1883, while his family's new residence, Sidney House (designed by FDG Stanley) was erected on the adjacent property. According to Florence Lord, in her 1930s series on Brisbane's Historic Homes, "Mr Jackson" brother-in-law of Thomas Finney, resided in Middenbury prior to the Finney's. Hervey Murray-Prior, a barrister and Master of Titles (and son of Thomas Lodge Murray-Prior, Queensland's first postmaster-general), was living at Middenbury with his family in 1885. However, by September of that year, the contents of the house were advertised for auction, suggesting an end to their tenancy around this time. Henry Bolton, a former Member of the Legislative Assembly of Victoria who became managing director of the Queensland Brewing Company in 1883, was living at Middenbury in mid-1889 when it was offered to let.

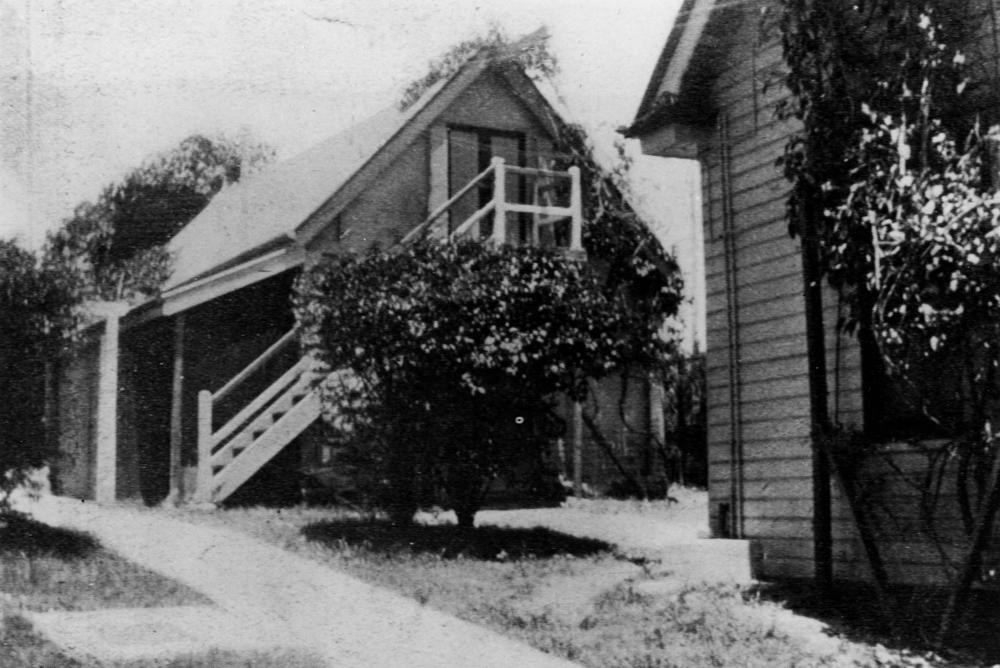
Original brick stables at Middenbury, 1932

In April 1885 Middenbury, described as "a commodious country residence...command[ing] views of reaches both up and down the stream, and overlooking the whole of Brisbane, north and south" was put up for auction, but was not sold. By July of that year Frank Rogers had bought out the three other shares held by his two sisters and Francis Rogers, and is believed to have occupied the house periodically in the late 1880s. Frank Rogers subdivided the 5 acres (2.0 ha) 2-rood-24.75-perch (2,649 m^{2}) property and sold off parcels to the south of the house, ultimately retaining the residence on just over 2 acres (0.81 ha) 2 roods 35.4 perches (2,920 m^{2}). Present day Archer Street was formed from this subdivision (officially named in 1887) and an entrance to Middenbury was made off this street. In August 1890 Timothy O'Shea, a retired successful Brisbane produce merchant, signed a one-year lease over Middenbury for £17 a month, before buying the property in August 1891. Middenbury remained the family residence of the O'Shea's until 1949. Timothy and Ellen O'Shea emigrated from Killarney, Ireland to Queensland in 1863. Of their five children who were raised in Brisbane, Timothy (Ted), Patrick (Pat or PJ) and only daughter Ella are known to have resided at Middenbury. After her mother's death in 1873, Ella assisted her father in raising the family and running the household, continuing this role after her father died. Patrick, Ted and other brother John, (Jack or JJ) were all solicitors, while another brother Michael James was a doctor. Patrick and Ted established the firm O'Shea and O'Shea (later O'Shea, Corser and Wadley) solicitors in 1891. Apart from his legal practice, Pat was involved in a range of business activities. Along with his brother Ted, he was part of the original syndicate which became the City Electric Light Company, and also maintained interests in the Queensland Brewery, Moreton Sugar Mill, furniture company John Hicks, and suburban property subdivision. An owner and breeder of horses, he was closely involved in the racing industry, a one-time president (for 22 years) and life member of the Queensland Turf Club. The PJ O'Shea Stakes, Queensland's major weight for age staying race, is named in his honour.

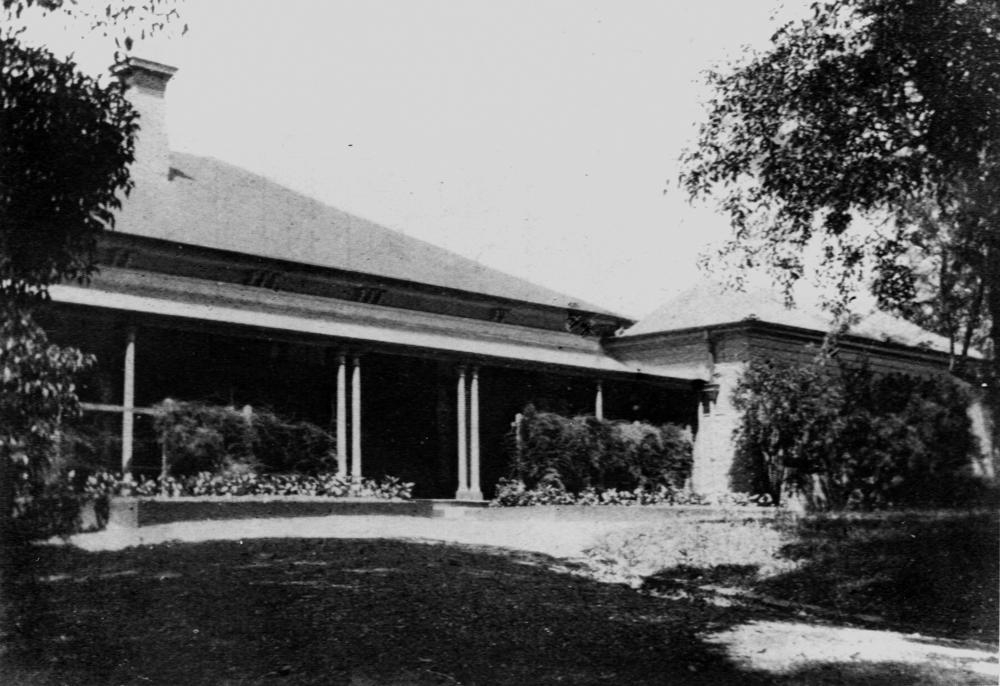
Middenbury, 1932

During the O'Shea's time at Middenbury, the longest period of continuous occupancy of the building as a residence, considerable alterations and additions occurred at the property. The largest change to the house was the addition of a brick building containing a study/bedroom and bathroom, connected to the house verandah by an open sided "piazza" which featured built-in wall beds. A garage and chauffeur's room were added along Archer Street, near the earlier brick stables which also housed a room for guests. While the extent of alterations to the grounds during the O'Shea period is unclear, it is known a lawn tennis court was established on a terraced area between the river and the house, while other landscape features included a large circular driveway, mature trees and a series of garden beds.

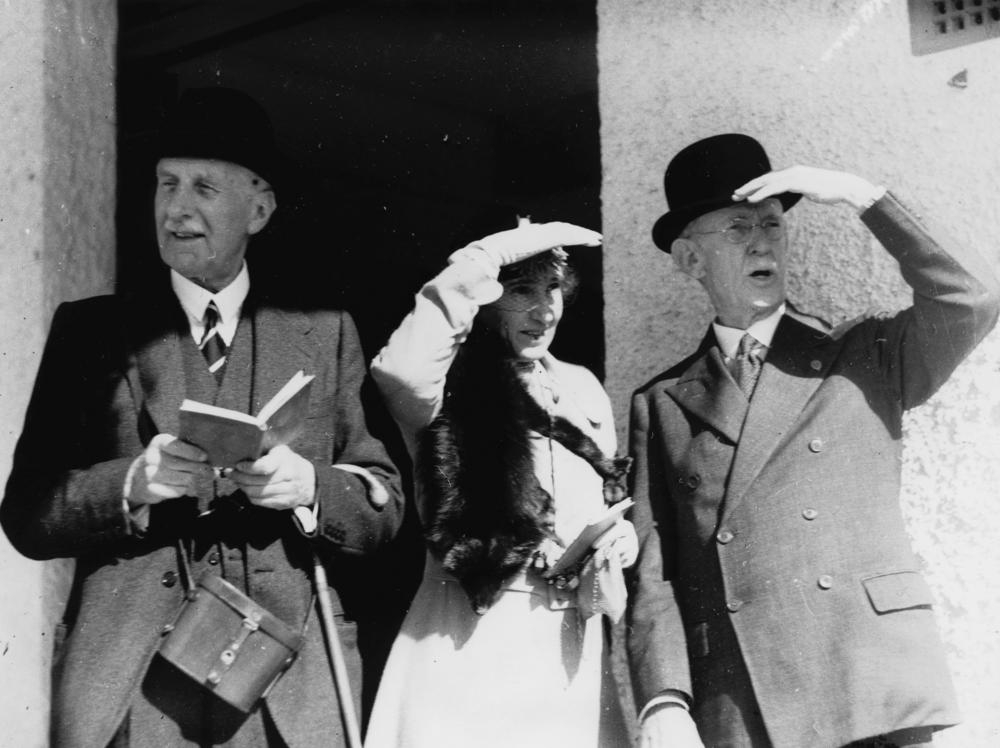
Patrick Joseph O'Shea (left) with Australian Governor-General Lord Gowrie (right) and Lady Gowrie (centre) at the races, September 1937

Timothy O'Shea died age 91 at Middenbury in 1922. Ella, Pat and Ted (d.1930) never married and lived out their days at Middenbury in comfortable circumstances. Prior to World War II, Middenbury became a well-known social venue for the elite in Brisbane, with the house and the grounds hosting numerous events and guests. The social pages of Brisbane's newspapers regularly reported on occasions held at the residence including events connected to racing and regatta parties. In 1936 Ella was featured as part of The Courier-Mail's "Brisbane Hostesses in the Home" series. Pictured in the drawing room of Middenbury, the article claimed, "Musicians, actors, travellers...who have been guests...have spread the fame of Miss Ella O'Shea as a hostess in all the English speaking countries". Ella O'Shea died on 2 February 1949, age 92. Three days later, on 5 February, Pat, who was reported as saying to his close friends, "If I live only five minutes after my sister, I shall die happy" also died, both leaving substantial estates. Pat's obituary in the Sunday Mail noted the end of an era at the now empty Middenbury, where, "Titled people, actors, artists, world celebrities were invited...They found its halls a home and its gardens a soft sanctuary".

After the deaths of the last members of the O'Shea family, Middenbury was put up for by auction on 6 July 1949. William Ramsay Webster and Amy Louisa Webster, of Webster's Cake and Biscuit Company, and the original Shingle Inn, purchased the property for just over £11,000. Prior to the sale, an auction notice described Middenbury at this time:

"Middenbury is substantially built of brick and wood, with slate and galvanised iron roofs, and comprises spacious verandahs, vestibule, halls, card room, lounge, music room, three bedrooms, two well appointed bathrooms with marble surrounds and shower room, with tiled floors, lounge verandah with set-in folding American beds, study, dining room with wine cellar, scullery, kitchen, with tiled fireplace...Maid's Rooms, brick chimneys with marble mantelpieces... built-in cupboards throughout, polished floors and sewered; Boiler room...laundry equipped with bricked-in copper and porcelain wash tubs, wood rooms, double garage with concreted wash yard, man's room and storerooms; Stable Building, with attic and comfortable bedroom; and 2 sets of brick lavatories".

The Webster family continued the O'Shea tradition of hosting large social gatherings at Middenbury, and lived there until 1955, when it was sold to Accommodation Australia Ltd after which it was used as a boarding house.

In 1957 the Commonwealth of Australia bought it and the Sidney House next door for the Australian Broadcasting Commission, now the Australian Broadcasting Corporation.

In 1957 Middenbury and the adjacent property containing Sidney House were purchased and combined (identified in 2014 as Lot 13, RP104400) by the Australian Broadcasting Commission, (ABC, now known as the Australian Broadcasting Corporation) to establish new adjoining Queensland facilities for radio and television production and broadcasting. Operated by the Australian Government, ABC television commenced radio broadcasting in Australia on 1 July 1932. The Queensland government-owned radio station 4QG was taken over by the ABC and broadcast in the mornings and evenings, before a second station 4QR was opened in 1938 to broadcast the full national program. The ABC was given responsibility to provide national television programs in 1954, commencing in November 1956, in time for the Olympic Games in Melbourne. The focus of ABC's television operations was initially in Melbourne and Sydney until the late 1950s, when services were established in Sydney, Adelaide and Hobart.

Sidney House was demolished to make way for the first major building on the site, the television studios. Constructed in brick, it was a three-storey building mounted by a 130-foot (40 m) steel-framed tower for beaming programmes to the main transmitting tower at nearby Mount Coot-tha. The building included an isolated studio, plus projection, sound, viewing control, and news section rooms. In 1968 the television studio building was extended towards the river. The other major building constructed on the site was the 1964 brick radio studio, located between Archer Street and Middenbury, which included special acoustic studios.

The ABC's first television broadcast in Queensland occurred on 2 November 1959 at 7PM. In a nod to its past, Middenbury hosted some 300 invited guests at the official function to mark the occasion, with 10 televisions set up within the building for viewing of the live broadcast of the ABC's "Queensland Television Service". "Channel 2" was Brisbane's third television station and Australia's twelfth. However, the ABC primarily used Middenbury as offices and a canteen.

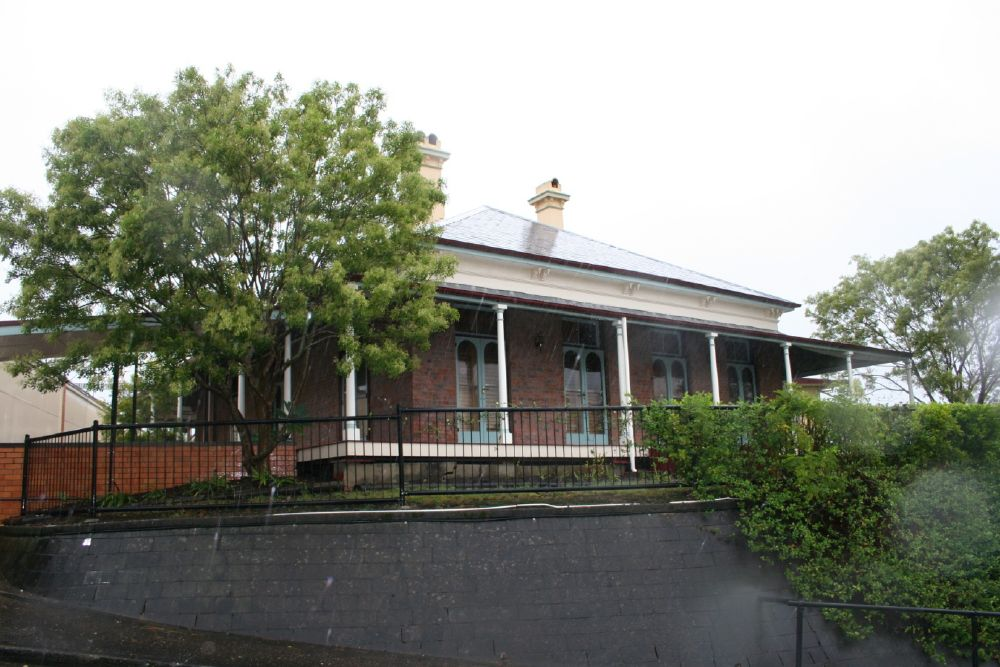
Middenbury, surrounded by a steep retaining wall, 2009

The ABC built several buildings on the site and the original wooden service wing at the rear, the extension, and the outbuildings including the garage were demolished and almost all the gardens destroyed; the house was almost surrounded by a steep retaining wall. As with Sidney House, the ABC had not originally intended to retain Middenbury, with its location designated for radio broadcasting facilities. By the early 1960s, earlier outbuildings, including the stables, garage and most of the garden features had been removed. On Coronation Drive, two large weeping figs near the former entrance were retained. As part of the major landscaping of the site, much of Middenbury became surrounded by a steep concrete retaining wall. At the house, the "piazza" and bedroom extension and the rear timber wing on the southwest were demolished.

In 1969, a report prepared by the Federal Department of Works on Middenbury identified the historical significance of the building and recommended preserving the house "if at all possible". The report noted part of the building was used for canteen facilities, "which could be extended to become a most attractive staff amenity" or alternatively "an excellent executive office suite". Repairs had also been undertaken and the interior "extensively decorated". Over time, Middenbury was used mainly as office space while part of the ABC's operations. The building underwent additions and alterations internally, including partitioning in some spaces to create new rooms. While elements disappeared, Middenbury retained its essential 1865 building form, some early internal spaces and cedar joinery, while maintaining its orientation and relationship to the river. In its last few years of occupancy by the ABC, Middenbury housed the Chief Executive, Finance and Human Resources operations.

The ABC used the house and 1.5 hectares (3.7 acres) of land until 2006–2007, when they vacated it after a high incidence of breast cancer was found among female employees raising concerns the site had radioactive contamination, although the site was subsequently declared to have no radioactivity in 2010. As the ABC's key site for broadcasting and production in Queensland for nearly half a century, the Toowong facilities were highly important, broadcasting news, current affairs and numerous other television and radio programs throughout Queensland and other parts of Australia. Between 1957 and 2007, the ABC's facilities were frequently altered, with the addition of other buildings on the site, and internal changes to earlier buildings. With the vacating of the site, much of the broadcasting equipment and associated fittings and fixtures were dismantled or removed, effectively inhibiting the site's ability to demonstrate its former function.

In 2012, the ABC Brisbane office moved into new studios at the South Bank Parklands.

== Description ==
Middenbury is a low-set, single-storey, brick former residence with a slate roof with rear timber wings and additions, located on a sloping property beside the Brisbane River in the Brisbane suburb of Toowong. The house is oriented to take advantage of the views and has timber verandahs on three sides. The interior includes fine cedarwood joinery, including folding doors enabling the large main room to be divided into two. It stands on the highest point of land in the western corner of an approximately 1.5-hectare (3.7-acre) site bounded by Coronation Drive to the north-west, Archer Street and a residential property to the south-west, the Brisbane River to the south-east, and residential properties to the north-east. Despite the construction of a number of later buildings on the site and extensive alterations to the surrounding terrain, views from Middenbury to the Brisbane River and the CBD have been maintained, while two large fig trees along the Coronation Drive boundary mark of the location of the original entrance drive.

In 2014, access to Middenbury and other buildings on site is via modern driveways cut into the original slope of the property, one each from Archer Street and Coronation Drive, which meet in the centre of the site. High, sloping concrete retaining walls line the edge of these driveways, effectively cutting off the platform of land on which Middenbury stands from the rest of the site. To the west of these driveways is a car park and loading area. The north-eastern portion of the site is largely covered by buildings. Built in close proximity to Middenbury on the north, east and southern sides are two double-storey buildings, which are connected to Middenbury's verandahs by paths and covered walkways.

Middenbury consists of a rectangular brick core with verandahs to three sides and a hipped roof. It is oriented with its long axis running north-west to south-east, with the south-east elevation facing the Brisbane River. The main entrance is located on the north-east side and a timber wing and other timber additions are attached to the rear (north-west) side.

The roof of the core is clad in slate with lead ridge capping and has boxed eaves ornamented with paired and tripled timber console brackets. Two rendered brick chimney stacks, one double and one single, capped by chimney pots, are symmetrically arranged on either side of the central ridgeline.

The concave, timber-framed verandah roofs are clad in corrugated metal sheeting. Verandah beams have stop-chamfered edges in places. The slender, cylindrical timber verandah posts with square base and top are modern replicas of the original posts, which were more finely detailed. Paired columns are located at the main entrance. The timber verandah decking is supported on rendered brick piers with metal ant caps.

The walls of the core are load-bearing red-brown brick laid in English bond. Above verandah roof height, the external walls are rendered, ornamented with a narrow ovolo moulding supporting the timber eaves brackets to the main roof.

The main entrance has a low-waisted, four panel cedar door with fanlight and half-glazed side panels. Timber-framed French doors with arched lights and rectangular fanlights open on to the three verandahs. One French door on the south-west side has rectangular glazed panels instead of arched. Fanlights are centre-pivoting and French doors are mounted on steel parliament hinges. Two former doorways in the south-west corner of the house have been filled with orange bricks.

The core contains seven rooms laid out on either side of an L-shaped corridor, which runs from a vestibule at the main entrance to a central hall before turning north-west to the rear of the house. The principal reception rooms overlook the river on the south-east side of the building, divided by a modern partition wall. Other rooms, including former bedrooms and a small room off the central hall, are different sizes and have had some walls relocated. One large room on the southern side of the corridor has different finishes to the rest of the house, being c. 1930s in style. A small bathroom and store room are located in the south-west corner of the core.

Early finishes and features include plaster ceilings and cornices, wide cedar skirtings (stained dark brown) and timber picture rails. In 2014, most internal walls are covered by at least one layer of wallpaper which has subsequently been painted over, and the timber floors are covered in carpet. Three former fireplaces have been enclosed.

Typical doors are low-waisted, cedar, four panel leaves set in moulded cedar frames with rectangular, centre-pivoting fanlights with a central vertical glazing bar. Surviving early door hardware includes brass, ceramic and timber knobs and keyhole covers. Some doors may have been relocated from their original positions.

In the entrance vestibule, a moulded plaster archway, with capitals and keystone, ornaments the opening to the central hall. The main reception room has a large rectangular doorway opening with holes in the timber lintel surviving as evidence of previous folding timber doors. This room also has a partially glazed six-panel timber door. The central hall has a curved corner at the intersection with the rear hallway. The small room off the central hall has built-in timber bookcases on either side of the former fireplace.

The c. 1930s room features a decorative plaster ceiling and cornices, a different profile of timber skirting, and different door architraves. The door to the hallway has a single-light fanlight with dimpled glass. In the western corner of the room is a small built-in cupboard with a linoleum clad floor.

The timber structures at the rear of the core consist of an L-shaped wing, remnants of rear verandahs (now enclosed) and 1960s additions.

The L-shaped wing has round timber stumps, external walls clad in timber chamferboards and a hipped roof clad in corrugated metal sheeting. Beneath the building, vertical timber batten screens run between the perimeter stumps, and a timber door on the north-west side provides access to the underfloor area. Windows on the north-east and north-west walls are timber, double-hung sashes. Entrance to this wing is via a half-glazed, four-panel timber door opening onto the north-east verandah, and through internal doors linking it to the other rear extensions. The interior is divided into a large room at the eastern end and a smaller room at the western end. In 2014 the walls and ceilings are lined with painted hardboard or plasterboard, stained timber skirtings and architraves, and the timber floor is lined with modern carpet.

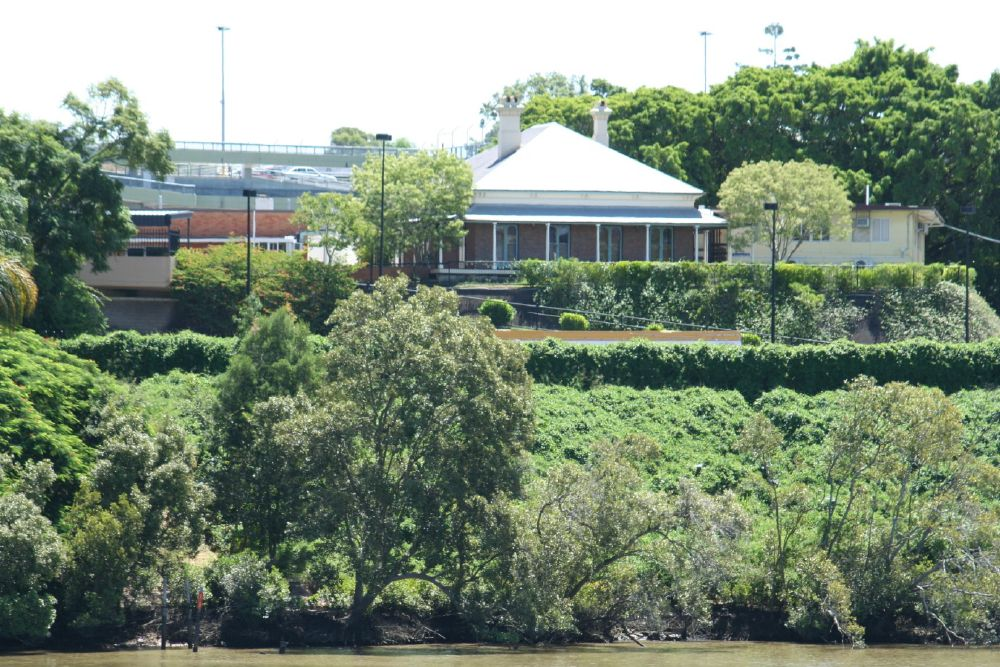
Middenbury from West End looking across the Brisbane River, 2009

A long rectangular room located along the rear of the core, fitted out as a kitchen in 2014, is in the location of an earlier room or verandah space and may contain early structural fabric. This room has a raked ceiling with a boxed-in beam spanning its length, painted hardboard wall and ceiling linings, and modern carpet over a timber floor. Some early fabric from a previous verandah may also survive in a small hallway area along the southern edge of the L-shaped wing.

Middenbury stands upon a remnant platform of land at original ground height, with lawns and recent garden beds to the north and east sides of the house. In this elevated location, Middenbury retains its original views to the Brisbane River and the Brisbane CBD, as well as being visible from the river and from the opposite bank at West End. Two significant, mature fig trees (possibly Ficus benjamina) are located north-west of Middenbury along the Coronation Drive boundary. These large trees, overhanging the road, are a landmark feature along Coronation Drive.

== Heritage listing ==
In 1968, Middenbury was one of the earliest listings on the Register of the National Trust of Queensland. It was also listed on the Brisbane Heritage Register and was included in the Register of the National Estate in 1978. When the Queensland Heritage Act 1992 commenced, Middenbury had been included in the newly established Queensland Heritage Register. However, in 2004 reference to it having been entered in the state register was removed by a decision of the Queensland Heritage Council, in acceptance of legal advice regarding properties owned by the Australian Government for public purposes.

When the ABC sold the Toowong site to Sunland Group in 2013, a condition of the sale was that an application be made to place the house on the Queensland Heritage Register. Sunland plans a high-rise residential development called Grace on Coronation; the house is to be preserved in a park setting and possibly used as a gallery or cafe. As at 2018, some site clearing has occurred but no construction has commenced.

Middenbury House was listed on the Queensland Heritage Register on 18 July 2014 having satisfied the following criteria.

The place is important in demonstrating the evolution or pattern of Queensland's history.

Middenbury, erected in 1865, is important in demonstrating the evolution of residential housing and pattern of settlement in Queensland, in particular the early establishment of villa residences on the suburban periphery of Brisbane in the 1860s. Through its form, materials, location and setting on the Brisbane River, Middenbury makes an important contribution to our understanding of residential and social hierarchies in early Brisbane.

Middenbury is also important for its association with Australian Broadcasting Corporation (ABC), as a component of its Queensland television and radio production facilities from 1957 to 2007.

The place is important in demonstrating the principal characteristics of a particular class of cultural places.

Middenbury is important in demonstrating the principal characteristics of an 1860s villa residence in Queensland, through its surviving formal plan, consisting of an entrance vestibule, large reception rooms, generously sized bedrooms, rear timber service wing; and the high quality workmanship and materials used in its construction, including fine cedar joinery. Consciously sited in an elevated location, the brick core with slate roof is surrounded on three sides by timber verandahs accessed by French doors, providing a generous space for entertaining and enjoying the views to the Brisbane River and CBD.

The place is important because of its aesthetic significance.

Middenbury is important for its aesthetic value as an elegant and well-composed villa residence designed to take advantage of its elevated position on the bank of the Brisbane River. Encircled by verandahs on three sides and orientated to capture surrounding views, the house demonstrates picturesque qualities, standing out from its surroundings when viewed from the river and the opposite bank at West End.

Two large fig trees, the only surviving elements of Middenbury's former gardens, are a landmark feature along Coronation Drive and make a significant contribution to the streetscape.
