= Miss World Australia 2022 =

Beauty pageant edition

- Date: 29 April 2022
- Venue: Palazzo Versace Australia, Main Beach, Queensland, Australia
- Entrants: 24
- Placements: 10
- Winner: Kristen Wright; Victoria

Miss World Australia 2022 was the 19th edition of the Miss World Australia pageant, held at the Palazzo Versace Australia in Queensland, Australia, on 29 April 2022.

Sarah Marschke of New South Wales crowned Kristen Wright of Victoria as her successor at the end of the event. Wright represented Australia at the Miss World 2023 pageant, where she placed as a top twelve finalist.

== Results ==
=== Placements ===
| Placement | Contestant |
|---|---|
| Miss World Australia 2022 | Victoria – Kristen Wright |
| 1st Runner-Up | New South Wales – Ruby Rose Schofield |
| 2nd Runner-Up | Queensland – Emma Jane Healy |
| 3rd Runner-Up | New South Wales – Selina McCloskey |
| 4th Runner-Up | New South Wales – Letitia Walker |
| Top 10 | New South Wales – Emma Hunt; Queensland – Breanna Monck; Queensland – Paris Bedford; Queensland – Rowena Petersen; Victoria – Lily Rose |

== Contestants ==
The 24 finalists were as follows:

| State/Territory | Contestant | Age | Height | Hometown |
|---|---|---|---|---|
| New South Wales | Emma Hunt | | | Sydney |
| New South Wales | Letitia Walker | | | Sydney |
| New South Wales | Maddison Hodder | | | |
| New South Wales | Ruby Rose Schofield | | | Sydney |
| New South Wales | Selina McCloskey | | | Newcastle |
| New South Wales | Susana Downes | | | Sydney |
| Queensland | Alicia Amber Hill | | | Brisbane |
| Queensland | Breanna "Bree" Monck | | | Gold Coast |
| Queensland | Emma Jane Healy | | | Brisbane |
| Queensland | Laurie Wynne | | | Brisbane |
| Queensland | Mary Holmes | | | |
| Queensland | Paris Bedford | | | Mackay |
| Queensland | Rowena Petersen | | | |
| Queensland | Sanchia Fernandes | | | Gold Coast |
| Queensland | Tatum Marais | | | Brisbane |
| Queensland | Windy Wulandari | | | Hamilton Island |
| South Australia | Taydam Knowles | | | Adelaide |
| Tasmania | Abbie Freeman | | 1.65 m (5 ft 5 in) | |
| Tasmania | Kimberly Odgers | | | |
| Victoria | Annette Sindiga | | | Melbourne |
| Victoria | Clara Momesso | | | Melbourne |
| Victoria | Demi Djemal | | | |
| Victoria | Kristen Wright | 23 | | Mornington |
| Victoria | Lakshana Soopaul | | | Melbourne |
| Victoria | Lily Rose | | | Melbourne |
| Victoria | Rebecca Watson | | | |
| Western Australia | Cydney Coleman | | | |
| Western Australia | Jenayah Elliot | | | Perth |
| Western Australia | Temeley Crawford | | | |
