= Waterfront =

Waterfront may refer to:

- Waterfront (area), the dockland district of a town

== Music ==
- Waterfront (band), a 1980s British pop duo
- Waterfront Records, an Australian record label
- "Waterfront" (song), a 1983 song by Simple Minds
- Waterfront Blues Festival, in Portland, Oregon
- Waterfront (album)

== Film and television ==
- Waterfront (1928 film), directed by William A. Seiter
- Waterfront (1939 film) a Warner Brothers film directed by Terry O. Morse
- Waterfront (1944 film), starring John Carradine
- Waterfront (1950 film), directed by Michael Anderson, starring Richard Burton and Robert Newton
- Waterfront (1955 TV series), a 1955 television series starring Preston Foster
- Waterfront (miniseries), a 1984 Australian miniseries
- The Waterfront (TV series), a 2025 television series created by Kevin Williamson

== Places ==
- Camden Waterfront, the docklands district of Camden, New Jersey, U.S.
- Waterfront, Swansea, a community and electoral ward in Swansea, Wales
- Quad Cities Waterfront Convention Center, located in Bettendorf, Iowa, USA
- Victoria & Alfred Waterfront, a historic harbour in Cape Town, South Africa
- Dubai Waterfront, a massive offshore community being built in Dubai, United Arab Emirates
- The Waterfront, Hong Kong, a private housing estate
- The Waterfront, an open-air shopping center in Homestead, Pennsylvania, just outside Pittsburgh
- The Waterfront Barrow-in-Furness, a large port redevelopment project in Barrow-in-Furness, England
- Waterfront Hall, a concert hall and exhibition centre in Belfast, Northern Ireland
- The Waterfront, Norwich, a music venue in Norwich, Norfolk
- Waterfront, New Jersey (disambiguation), various places
- WaterFront Center, a non-profit center for marine education in Oyster Bay, New York
- Waterfront Place, Brisbane, a large office tower in Brisbane, Australia
- Waterfront Park (Seattle), a public park on the Central Waterfront, Downtown, Seattle, Washington, USA
- Waterfront Trail, a series of trails along the shore of Lake Ontario, Canada
- Waterfront Station (Singapore)
- Waterfront station (Vancouver), a ferry terminal and train station in Vancouver, Canada
- Waterfront station (Washington Metro), a Washington Metro station
- Waterfront City (disambiguation), various places
- San Benedetto del Tronto Waterfront, long avenue and tourist attraction of San Benedetto del Tronto, Italy
- Stockholm Waterfront, an office building in Stockholm, Sweden
- Chatham Waterfront bus station, a bus station located in Chatham, UK
- Beau Rivage, a waterfront themed casino located in Biloxi, Mississippi

== Other uses ==
- Waterfront Shipping, a Norwegian company operating tankers
- Waterfront Commission of New York Harbor
- Waterfront Historic Area League
- Waterfront Workers History Project
- Waterfront (novel), a 1934 novel by John Brophy

== See also ==
- Dock (maritime)
- Docklands (disambiguation)
