= Miss Grand Australia 2026 =

10th Miss Grand Australia competition, beauty pageant edition

- Cat Jane Shepherd
- Date: 20 June 2026
- Venue: The Imperial Hotel, Gold Coast, Queensland
- Entrants: 18
- Placements: 5
- Winner: Cat Jane Shepherd (Western Australia)

Miss Grand Australia 2026 was the 10th edition of the Miss Grand Australia pageant, held on 20 June 2026 at the The Imperial Hotel, Gold Coast, Queensland. Eighteen contestants competed for the title.

The contest was won by Cat Jane Shepherd, an actress and activist representing Western Australia. She will represent Australia at the Miss Grand International 2026 pageant, to be held in India in October 2026.

Organized by Miss Australia Pageants, the event was held in support of the anti-human trafficking organization Destiny Rescue as part of the organization's charitable initiatives. The pageant also continued to promote the Miss Grand International's Stop the War and Violence campaign, which advocates peace and raises awareness of violence against women and children.

== Result ==
Placement	Contestant
Miss Grand Australia 2025	Western Australia – Cat Jane Shepherd
1st runner-up	New South Wales – Jamie Boyd
2nd runner-up	Western Australia – Mischa Edwards
3rd runner-up	New South Wales – Valentina Namnoum
4th runner-up	New South Wales – Sarah Rose

== Contestants ==
Eighteen contestants competed for the title.

- New South Wales

1. Sydney – Sarah Rose
2. Sydney – Jamie Boyd
3. Sydney – Valentina Namnoum
4. Sydney – Isabela Cortesi
5. Sydney – Katelyn Mills
6. Sydney – Beloved Rafatee
7. Sydney – Courtney Brittle

- Queensland

1. Gold Coast – Maddison Rose Lee
2. Gold Coast – Nikol Slynkova
3. Gold Coast – Celine Carrington
4. Sunshine Coast – Molly Arnot

- South Australia

1. Adelaide – Fairy Bhavsar

- Victoria

1. Melbourne – Laura Castillo Pinzon
2. Melbourne – Preetinder Kaur
3. Melbourne – Veronica Bui

- Western Australia

1. Perth – Cat Jane Shepherd
2. Perth – Simona Jankulovski
3. Perth – Mischa Edwards
