= Miss Grand Australia 2025 =

9th Miss Grand Australia contest

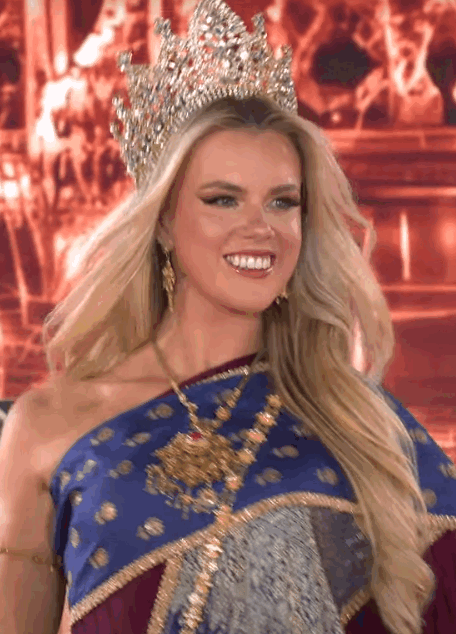
- Gabriella Oxley, the winner of the contest
- Date: 27 July 2025
- Venue: The Imperial Hotel, Gold Coast, Queensland
- Producer: Miss Australia Pageants
- Entrants: 19
- Placements: 10
- Winner: Gabriella Oxley (Queensland)

Miss Grand Australia 2025 was the 9th Miss Grand Australia pageant, held on 27 July 2025, at the Imperial Hotel, Gold Coast, Queensland. Nineteen contestants from different cities of the country competed for the title. It was also the first Miss Grand Australia pageant organized by the 2019-established Miss Australia Pageants, chaired by Sophia Harris and Charlotte Allison-Bruce.

The pageant was won by a 25-year-old model from Queensland, Gabriella Oxley, making her eligible to represent Australia internationally in the parent stage, Miss Grand International 2025, held on 18 October 2025 in Bangkok, Thailand.

== Result ==
| Placement | Contestant |
|---|---|
| Miss Grand Australia 2025 | Queensland – Gabriella Oxley |
| 1st runner-up | Victoria – Jada Kyle |
| 2nd runner-up | New South Wales – Rebecca Shandley |
| 3rd runner-up | New South Wales – Kiara McCarthy |
| 4th runner-up | Western Australia – Rattana Luangnan |
| 5th runner-up | Queensland – Annabelle Munt |

== Contestants ==
Nineteen contestants competed for the title.

- New South Wales

1. Glen Innes – Charlotte Archibald
2. Orange – Chelsea Shrimpton
3. Sydney – Kiara Prieto-McCarthy
4. Sydney – Rebecca Shandley
5. Sydney – Sienna Allsop
6. Sydney – Evana Jibraeel

- Queensland

1. Brisbane – Hrudhya Sibi
2. Gold Coast – Gabriella Oxley
3. Gold Coast – Ocean Tiesman
4. Gold Coast – Sofia Manan
5. Mackay – Annabelle Munt

- South Australia

1. Adelaide – Sasha Lapcevic

- Victoria

1. Echuca – Michelle Carter
2. Melbourne – Jada Kristeile Kyle
3. Melbourne – Bahli Ulrick
4. Melbourne – Melanie Richard
5. Melbourne – Sonali Pathirage
6. Melbourne – Shevonne Ambanloc

- Western Australia

1. Perth – Rattana Luangnan
