= Sunland Group =

Development company in Queensland, Australia

Sunland Group Limited
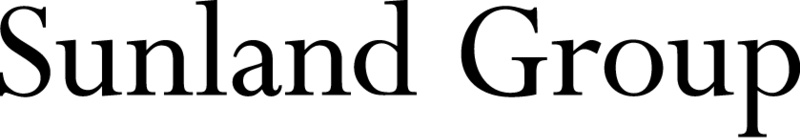
- Type: Public company
- Traded as: ASX: SDG
- Industry: Property development
- Founded: 1983
- Founders: Soheil Abedian and Foad Fathi
- Headquarters: Brisbane, Australia
- Key people: Sahba Abedian, Managing director
- Website: Sunland Group Limited

Sunland Group Limited (ASX: SDG) is an Australian property development company headquartered in South East Queensland, Australia. The company was founded in 1983 by Iranian-Australian businessmen Soheil Abedian and Foad Fathi.

In 1995, Sunland became a publicly-listed company, and experienced success developing properties on the Gold Coast. However, in 2006, the Queensland Crime and Misconduct Commission concluded that the company and founder Soheil Abedian had made inappropriate concealed political donations. From 2009 to 2015, the company was embroiled in a bribery scandal related to development projects in Dubai, resulting in the resignation of many of the company’s directors, including James Packer, who recommended that the company be liquidated. Concerns continued to be raised about political donations made on behalf of the company and by its directors up to 2019.

In June 2021 an application was submitted to deregister the company with the Australian Securities and Investments Commission, and in October 2021, it was confirmed that the company would be wound up by 2023. Founder Soheil Abedian has said that the company will continue as a private business.

== Developments ==
Sunland has built Palazzo Versace, a five-star hotel on the Gold Coast, which opened in September 2000, and Q1 in Surfers Paradise, which had been the world's tallest residential tower from its opening in November 2005 until April 2011. Other developments include residential high-rises Yve (2005) and Balancea (2008), both situated in Melbourne, and the 41-storey Abian tower near the City Botanic Gardens in Brisbane, which was completed in 2017.

The Grace on Coronation, a three-tower project at the site of the former ABC studios at Toowong, was proposed in 2015.

In 2021 the company began liquidating its assets in order to return funds to shareholders. Some of its assets were purchased by the Arium Group at auction, a company founded in December 2020 in which Sunland Managing Director Sahba Abedian had a major interest with 51 million shares and founder Soheil Abedian had an indirect interest with 9 million shares. In response to legal implications of selling to a related party it was decided that Sunland shareholders would need to approve the transfer.

== Privatisation ==
In December 2020 media outlets began speculating that the company was preparing for privatization and managing director Sahba Abedian denied the rumours stating that privatisation was “not something that the board will ever consider”, however in 2021 founder Soheil Abedian confirmed that the company was being delisted from the Australian Securities Exchange and becoming a private business.

== Controversies ==
=== Crime and Misconduct Commission ===
In 2006 the Queensland Crime and Misconduct Commission identified Soheil Abedian and the Sunland Group as key players in the 2004 Gold Coast Council election, noting that they had made improper hidden donations in order to gain political favors. Around the same time Sunland donated $18,000 to Gary Baildon during his election campaign to be Mayor of the Gold Coast which was raised to criticise Baildon's links to property developers during a 2016 Mayoral election debate. In May 2006, following the release of the Queensland Crime and Misconduct Commission report, Sunland managing director Sahba Abedian announced that the Sunland Group would not make any more donations to individual councillors of the Gold Coast City Council but also stated that the company would continue to make donations to political parties as every individual in Australia had a democratic right to do so.

=== Dubai bribery case ===
In March 2009 it was reported that Sunland executive David Brown, an architect and middle eastern head of the company, had been placed under arrest in Dubai, had his passport confiscated, and was interrogated at least eight times due to allegations of bribery in relation to a 2007 property deal. Matthew Joyce and Marcus Lee, employees of Dubai-based development company Nakheel, were placed under arrest at the same time as the allegations involved Sunland paying Nakheel millions of dollars in consultancy fees. Sunland managing director Sahba Abedian denied that Sunland was implicated in the investigation, however concerns were expressed that people were being made scapegoats. In May 2009 Sahba Abedian met with the Dubai prosecutor and advised that Sunland were going to launch legal proceedings in Australia which would require David Brown being able to travel to Australia to meet with lawyers regarding the case and Brown had his passport returned in July that year. Sunland later argued that Brown's passport being returned was unrelated and that it was only returned so he could attend his mothers birthday party, although he was unable to attend the party after returning to Australia.

In 2009 Sunland accused Matthew Joyce and Marcus Lee of fraud alleging that Joyce, who was managing director of a Nakheel subsidiary, and Lee had conspired to trick the company into paying property developer Angus Reed $14 million before it could purchase a prime plot on the Dubai Waterfront. The case was heard in courts in both Dubai and Victoria. James Packer had been a company director of Sunland but demanded the company be liquidated when the scandal came to light and quit the board and sold his stake in the company in August 2009, John Leaver demanded that all company announcements require approval from the board before retiring as director in 2010, and Terry Jackman stood down as chairman of the company in 2011. In 2010 Fairfax Media reported that Sunland had misled the ASX three times by claiming that Brown had never been investigated regarding the case.

Sunland Executive David Brown initially claimed he had been approached by Angus Reed regarding the land plot, but in 2011 before the Victorian Supreme Court he clarified that he had approached Reed, and made a succession of admissions that claims he had made to the Dubai court regarding the case were incorrect, but admitted he had not amended his claims in the Dubai court. In June 2012, Sunland's case was dismissed in the Supreme Court of Victoria. The judge said that Sunland had failed to make proper disclosures, and described the case as a "fabrication". The judge also criticised David Brown for withholding a diary entry from the Dubai court, stating that "This note is very clear and it is just not plausible that Brown would have overlooked this note when preparing the material for the Dubai authorities,".

In early 2013 Soheil Abedian denied that Sunland had made a claim against Marcus Lee prompting Lee's lawyer to comment "It's all well and good for them to say now they think he’s innocent but that's not what they said to authorities in Dubai," and former Prime Minister of Australia Malcolm Fraser criticised Abedian saying "If Sunland had nothing to fear, why won't their people go back to Dubai as they've been subpoenaed to do?", however Abedian responded to criticism by saying "Anybody who knows me, they will say that my whole being is about righteousness," . Although Sunland denied pursuing a claim against Lee it pursued a lawsuit against Matthew Joyce with managing director Sahba Abedian saying "It is inevitable and unavoidable... I don't think one should compromise on one's values in life." In April 2013 an injunction was filed against Fairfax Media and journalist Ben Butler who had been covering the case prompting a Sydney Morning Herald article to state: "The injunction against Fairfax and reporter Ben Butler is the latest in a string of cases where powerful business interests have taken legal action to restrain reporting."

In May 2013, Joyce and Reed were found guilty of defrauding Sunland by a Dubai court. This decision was overturned in November 2013, and Joyce, Lee and Reed were acquitted. Two months earlier, the Victorian Supreme Court judged that Sunland had run the case "for ulterior motive or in wilful disregard of the facts or clearly established law". The specific ulterior motive named by the justice was that the case had been launched to recover the passport of Sunland Executive David Brown who was under suspicion of having bribed Dubai authorities.

The Dubai legal battle ended in December 2013, when Sunland was ordered to pay $6.7 million in legal fees to Joyce and Reed. The trial judge stated that Sunland's case was "simply implausible", that documents had been fabricated, that Sunland Executive David Brown was "unreliable", that Sunland founder Soheil Abedian was a "consistently uncooperative witness", and that Sunland had failed to disclose that it was under investigation for bribery in Dubai noting he was forwarding his judgement to ASIC which had opened an investigation of Sunland in 2012. ASIC dropped inquiries in 2016 without reporting a reason and with no action taken. Sahba Abedian commented "We are pleased with the outcome, which reconfirms Sunland’s position over the course of the last number of years."

=== Political donations ===
During the Dubai legal case Soheil Abedian personally donated $12,500 to the Liberal National Party shortly after Stuart Robert gave a speech to the Australian Parliament written by the companies lobbyist, Simone Holzapfel, and in addition over 2014 and 2015 Abedian and the Sunland Group donated at least $25,000 to the LNP, which caused the Australian Labor Party to describe it as a "cash for comment" deal, although Sunland denied receiving any benefit from its donations. A news report on the donation noted Abedian had also donated to the Labor Party in the past. In 2016 further concerns were raised regarding Roberts links to Sunland due to his support for one of the companies construction projects on the Gold Coast after he admitted that he had used Queensland LNP fundraising body the Fadden Forum to secretly provide $60,000 to candidates in the 2016 Gold Coast Council election and that Sunland lobbyist Simone Holzapfel had donated $100,000 to the Fadden Forum. Holzapfel stated that the money was a personal donation and was not made on behalf of the Sunland Group.

In October 2018 the Queensland State Government passed laws criminalizing property developers making political donations, however in 2019 it was reported in Gold Coast Council minutes that while Soheil Abedian was a prohibited donor he had made donations to a charity which the Mayoress was a director of. A Gold Coast Council member also reported a possible conflict of interest in relation to the Sunland Group as Soheil Abedian had said to him "I hope at the next election it will be proven you do not deserve to sit on the chair you occupy." Also in 2019 Sunland director Rebecca Frizelle donated $10,000 to the LNP which was possibly a violation of the prohibited donor law, although Frizelle denied that her donation was related to her position at Sunland stating that "The Sunland development group does not make donation to any political party."

=== Other ===
In 2011 the body corporate of Q1 Tower sued the Sunland Group due to defects and corrosion and the company fought the lawsuit arguing that it had not provided a guarantee the tower would be free from defects in its construction contract.

In December 2019 Riaz Rezvani, the Housing Manager of the Sunland Group and son-in-law of founder Soheil Abedian, allegedly assaulted Gold Coast businessman Jack Ray by punching him in the groin at a meeting which former Sunland director Terry Jackman was also present at with Jackman saying "I was absolutely amazed and thought it was an extraordinary thing to happen … disgraceful"

In 2020 Sunland director Vahid Saberi acquired Sunland shares without advising the company and completing the required ASX paperwork, prompting the company secretary to distribute the company Securities Trading Policy to all directors.
