= Miss Grand and Miss Supranational Australia 2014 =

1st Miss Grand Australia competition, beauty pageant edition

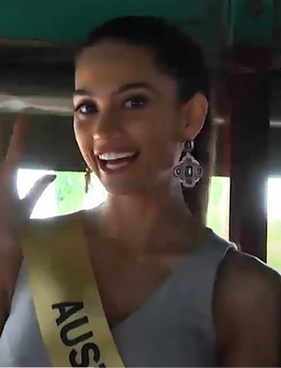
- Renera Thompson, Miss Grand Australia 2014
- Date: 30 August 2014
- Venue: TRAK Live Lounge Bar, Melbourne
- Entrants: 19
- Placements: 8
- Miss Grand Australia: Renera Thompson (New South Wales)
- Miss Supranational Australia: Yvonne Amores (New South Wales)

External videos
- Crowning Miss Supranational & Miss Grand Australia 2014

Miss Grand and Miss Supranational Australia 2014 was an Australian beauty pageant held to select the country's representatives for the Miss Grand International 2014 and Miss Supranational 2014 pageants. The event was held on 30 August 2014 at the TRAK Live Lounge Bar in Melbourne. Nineteen contestants representing different states and territories competed for the titles. A model from New South Wales, Renera Thompson, was crowned Miss Grand Australia 2014, with Breanna Herbert from Victoria finishing as the first runner-up, while Filipina-Austrian model and television presenter Yvonne Amores from Sydney was crowned Miss Supranational Australia 2014.

Thompson later represented Australia at the parent international pageant, Miss Grand International 2014, held on 7 October in Thailand, where she finished as the third runner-up; she later became the national director of Miss Grand Australia after taking over the franchise the following year. Meanwhile, Amores represented Australia at Miss Supranational 2014 in Poland, where she placed among the Top 20 finalists.

== Result ==
| Position | Delegate |
|---|---|
| Miss Grand Australia 2014 | New South Wales – Renera Thompson |
| Miss Supranational Australia 2014 | New South Wales – Yvonne Amores |
| 1st runner-up Miss Grand Australia | Victoria – Breanna Herbert |
| 1st runner-up Miss Supranational Australia | Western Australia – Elise Natalie Duncan |

== Contestants ==
The following is the list of the 19 candidates for the Miss Grand and Miss Supranational Australia 2014 pageant.

Team Queensland
Team New South Wales
Team Victoria
- Belinda Cameron
- Jess Smallman
- Noreen Pisa
- Annabel Van Der Nagel
- Renera Thompson
- Jessica Young
- Yvonne Amores
- Ariel Xue
- Jing Ren
- Brianna Driver
- Sara Salmeron
- Sylwia Lewandowska
- Breanna Herbert
- Natasha Leevi Harris
- Louisa Brown
- Jessica Parrish
Team Western Australia
- Elise Natalie Duncan
- Caitlin Gilchrist
- Aleisha Hudson
