= Miss Grand Australia 2022 =

6th Miss Grand Australia competition, beauty pageant edition

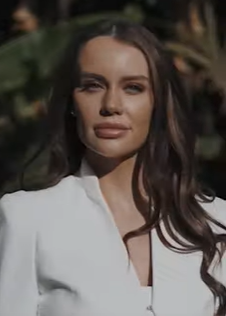
- Amber Sidney, the winner of the contest
- Date: July 16, 2022
- Venue: Sofitel Sydney Wentworth, Sydney
- Entrants: 21
- Placements: 10
- Winner: Amber Sidney (Geelong)

Miss Grand Australia 2022 was the sixth edition of the Miss Grand Australia pageant, held on July 16, 2022, at the Sofitel Sydney Wentworth, Sydney. Twenty-one candidates from different states and territories of Australia competed for the title as well as the right to represent the country at its parent international stage, Miss Grand International 2022.

At the end of the event, a 26-year-old communications coordinator from the state of Victoria, Amber Sidney, was named the winner, while Paitin Powell from the state of Queensland was named the first runner-up. Amber later represented Australia at the aforementioned international contest in Indonesia on October 25, but was unplaced, making her the first Australian representative to be disqualified at the Miss Grand International.
