= Miss Grand Australia =

National beauty contest in Australia

- Formation: August 30, 2014; 12 years ago
- Founder: Nadasha Zhang
- Type: Beauty pageant
- Headquarters: Sydney
- Location: Australia
- Members: Miss Grand International
- Official language: English
- National Directors: Charlotte & Sophia Allison-Bruce
- Parent organization: Miss Australia Pageants (2025 – Present); Rise Academy (2017 – 2024); Sailed Productions (2013 – 2014)
- Website: Official Website

Miss Grand Australia is an annual national beauty pageant in Australia established in 2014 by Nadasha Zhang to select the country's representative for the Miss Grand International pageant.

The first two editions were held jointly with Miss Supranational Australia before the pageant became a stand-alone competition in 2017, when Dani Fitch assumed the national license.

Since Australia's debut at Miss Grand International in 2013, its representatives have consistently placed among the Top 20 finalists, except in 2022. The country's best result came in 2015, when Claire Elizabeth Parker inherited the Miss Grand International title after the original winner was dethroned.

== History ==
Australia has regularly sent representatives to compete at the Miss Grand International pageant since 2013. The Australian license was initially held by Nadasha Zhang from 2013 to 2014, before being transferred to Renera Thompson in 2015, Dani Fitch in 2017, and Amber Dew in 2023.

The first Miss Grand Australia contest was held jointly with Miss Supranational Australia in 2014, featuring 19 national finalists, with Renera Thompson winning the Miss Grand Australia title. Thompson later represented Australia at Miss Grand International 2014 in Thailand, where she finished as the third runner-up. The two pageants were again held jointly in 2016. After Dani Fitch acquired the national license in the following year, Miss Grand Australia has since been organized as a stand-alone pageant.

Since its debut in 2013, Australia has consistently placed among the Top 20 finalists at Miss Grand International, except in 2022. The country's highest achievement came in 2015, when Claire Elizabeth Parker finished as the first runner-up and was later elevated to the winner's position after the original titleholder, Anea Garcia of the Dominican Republic, was dethroned. Parker was subsequently stripped of the title in 2019 after competing in Miss Universe Australia 2019.

== Editions ==
=== Location and date ===
Edition	Date	Final venue	Entrants	Ref.
1st	30 August 2014	TRAK Live Lounge Bar, Melbourne, Victoria	19	(Note: Held in parallel with Miss Supranational Australia 2014.)
2nd	14 August 2016	NIDA Playhouse Theatre, Sydney, New South Wales	18	(Note: Held in parallel with Miss Supranational Australia 2016.)
3rd	30 June 2017	Doltone House - Hyde Park, Sydney, New South Wales	16	
4th	16 June 2018	Sofitel Sydney Wentworth, Sydney, New South Wales	28	
5th	8 June 2019	Sofitel Sydney Wentworth, Sydney, New South Wales	29	
6th	16 July 2022	Sofitel Sydney Wentworth, Sydney, New South Wales	20	
7th	15 July 2023	RACV City Club, Melbourne, Victoria	30	
8th	3 August 2024	Sofitel Darling Harbour, Sydney, New South Wales	21	
9th	26 July 2025	The Imperial Hotel, Gold Coast, Queensland	19	
10th	20 June 2026	The Imperial Hotel, Gold Coast, Queensland	18	

=== Competition result ===
Edition	Winner	Runners-up					Ref.
Edition	Winner	First	Second	Third	Fourth	Fifth	Ref.
1st	Renera Thompson (New South Wales)	Breanna Herbert (Victoria)	Not awarded				
2nd	Dani Fitch (New South Wales)	Jessica Parrish (Victoria)	Sophie Grosser (South Australia)	Not awarded			
3rd	Kassandra Kashian (New South Wales)	Maddison Clare Sloane (New South Wales)	Sophie Grosser (South Australia)	Amelia Conway (New South Wales)	Alana Thomas (New South Wales)	Not awarded	
4th	Kimberly Gundani (Victoria)	Chloe Maddison Ryan (Capital Territory)	Jasmine Leatham (Victoria)	Krishna Shukla (Capital Territory)	Alana Thomas (New South Wales)	Not awarded	
5th	Taylor Curry Marlene (Queensland)	Anja Christ Offersen (Queensland)	Lavinia White (New South Wales)	Alecia McCallum (New South Wales)	Jazel Alarca (New South Wales)	Jayde Crystal Wright (New South Wales)	
6th	Amber Sidney (Victoria)	Paitin Powell (Queensland)	Brooke Murray (New South Wales)	Christy Taylor (New South Wales)	Lydia Harland (New South Wales)	Not awarded	
7th	Mikaela-Rose Fowler (Victoria)	Paitin Powell (Queensland)	Brooke Murray (New South Wales)	Selina McCloskey (New South Wales)	Alecia McCallum (New South Wales)	Not awarded	
8th	Paitin Powell (Queensland)	Jada Kyle (Victoria)	Patricia Sheeran (New South Wales)	Letitia Walker (New South Wales)	Courtney-Jade Tester (Western Australia)	Not awarded	
9th	Gabriella Oxley (Queensland)	Jada Kyle (Victoria)	Rebecca Shandley (New South Wales)	Kiara McCarthy (New South Wales)	Rattana Luangnan (Western Australia)	Annabelle Munt (Queensland)	
10th	Cat Jane Shepherd (Western Australia)	Jamie Boyd (New South Wales)	Mischa Edwards (Western Australia)	Valentina Namnoum (New South Wales)	Sarah Rose (New South Wales)	Not awarded	

== International competition ==
The following is a list of Australian representatives who competed at the Miss Grand International pageant.

Color keys

- : Declared as the winner
- : Ended as a runner-up (Top 5)
- : Ended as a finalist (Top 10)
- : Ended as a semifinalist (Top 20/21)
- : Ended as special awards winner

Year	Town	Miss Grand Australia	Title	Placement	Special Awards	National Director
2026	Perth	Cat Jane Shepherd	Miss Grand Australia 2026	Unplaced		Sophia Harris & Charlotte Allison-Bruce
2025	Gold Coast	Gabriella Oxley	Miss Grand Australia 2025	Unplaced		Sophia Harris & Charlotte Allison-Bruce
2024	Whitsundays	Paitin Powell	Miss Grand Australia 2024	Unplaced		Dani Fitch
2023	Mornington	Mikaela-Rose Fowler	Miss Grand Australia 2023	Unplaced		Amber Sidney
2022	Melbourne	Amber Sidney	Miss Grand Australia 2022	Unplaced		Dani Fitch
2021	Sydney	Angolina Amores	Appointed	Top 20		Dani Fitch
Did not compete in 2020						Dani Fitch
2019	Gold Coast	Taylor Marlene	Miss Grand Australia 2019	Top 10		Dani Fitch
2018	Melbourne	Kimberly Gundani	Miss Grand Australia 2018	Top 20		Dani Fitch
2017	Sydney	Kassandra Kashian	Miss Grand Australia 2017	Top 20		Dani Fitch
2016	Sydney	Dani Fitch	Miss Grand Australia 2016	Top 20		Renera Thompson
2015	Sydney	Claire Elizabeth Parker	Appointed	Winner (Note: Originally named the 1st runner-up, but was later promoted to the Winner.)		Renera Thompson
2014	Sydney	Renera Thompson	Miss Grand Australia 2014	3rd Runner-up		Nadasha Zhang
2013	Sydney	Kelly Louise Maguire	Appointed	4th Runner-up		Nadasha Zhang

== Winner gallery ==
Miss Grand Australia 2026
Cat Jane Shepherd

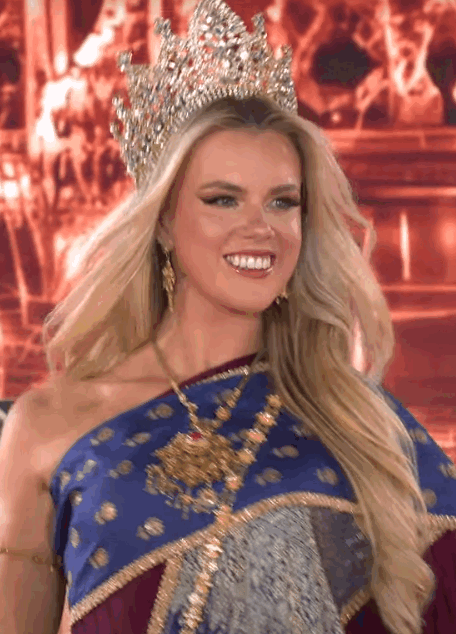
Miss Grand Australia 2025
Gabriella Oxley

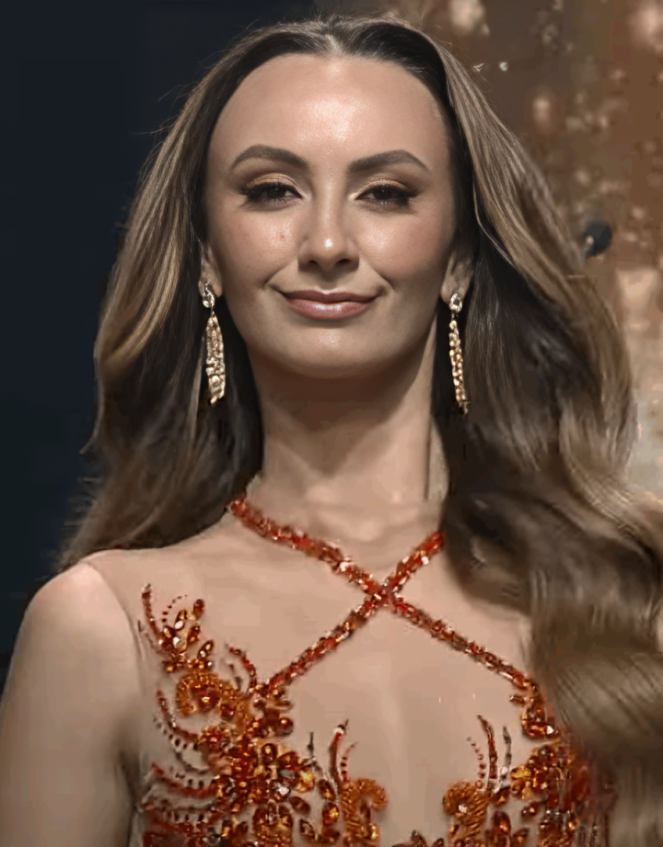
Miss Grand Australia 2024
Paitin Powell

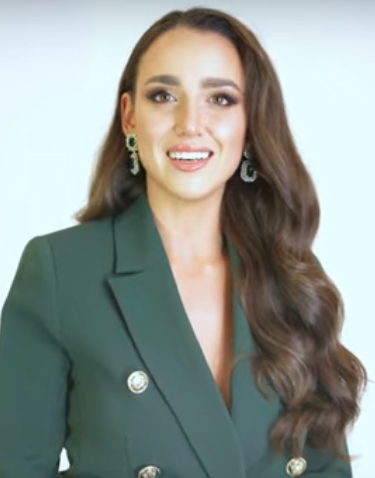
Miss Grand Australia 2023
Mikaela-Rose Fowler

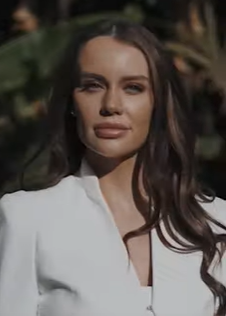
Miss Grand Australia 2022
Amber Sidney

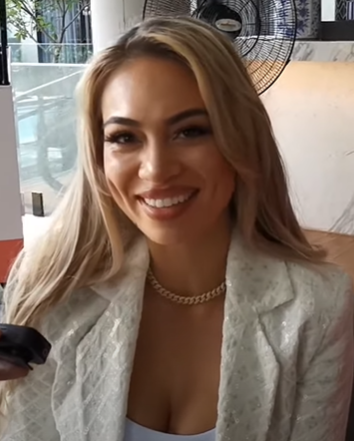
Miss Grand Australia 2021
Angolina Amores

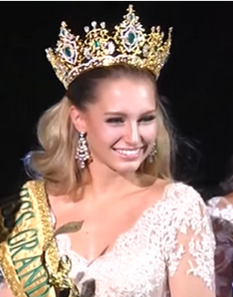
Miss Grand Australia 2015
Claire Elizabeth Parker

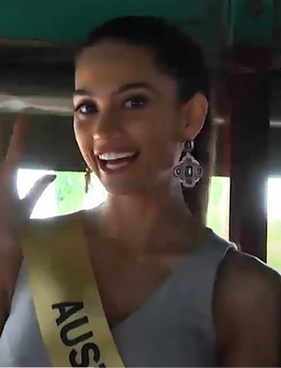
Miss Grand Australia 2014
Renera Thompson
