= Miss Grand Australia 2018 =

4th Miss Grand Australia competition, beauty pageant edition

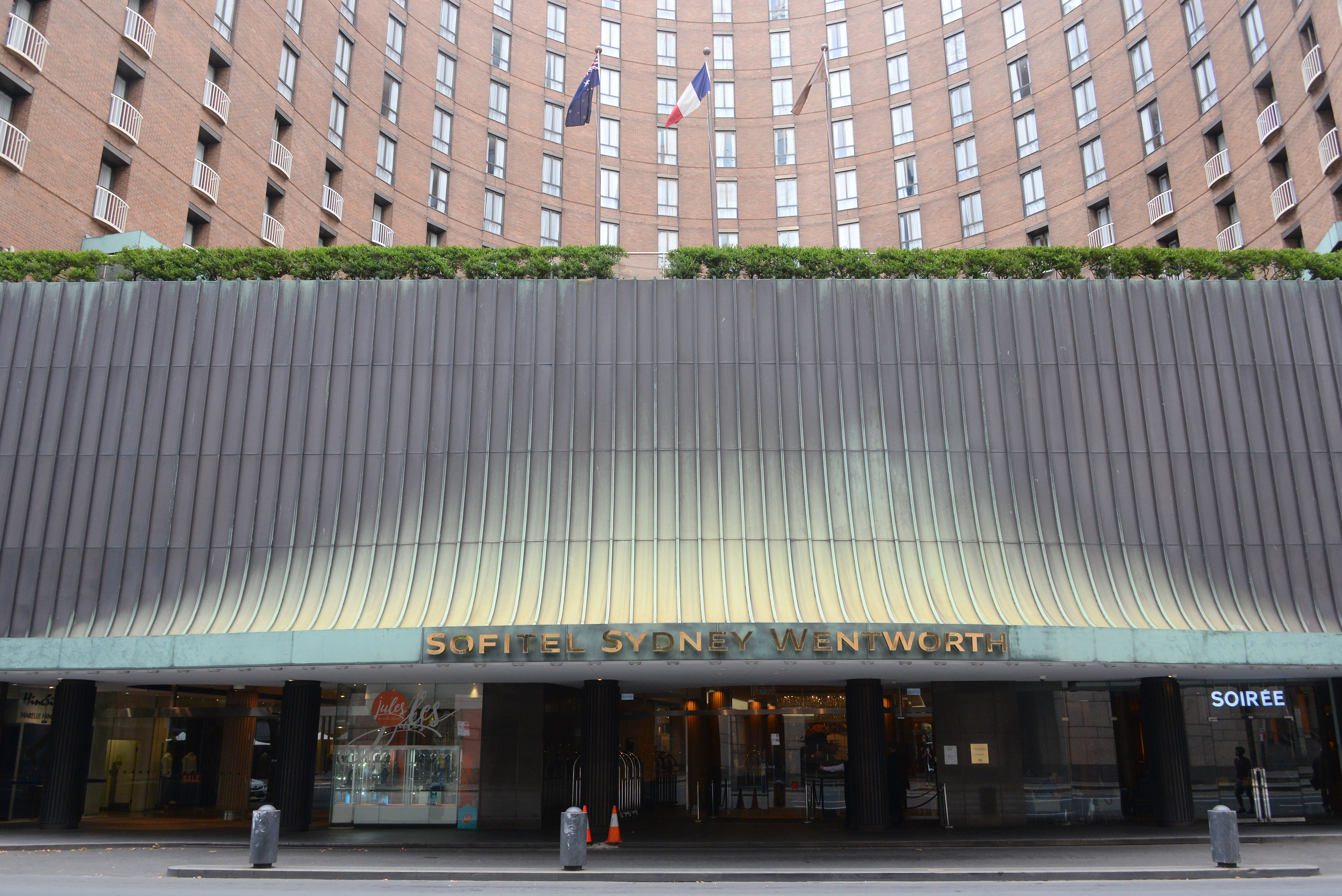
- Sofitel Sydney Wentworth, the venue of the contest
- Date: June 16, 2018
- Presenters: Claire Parker
- Venue: Sofitel Sydney Wentworth, Sydney
- Entrants: 42
- Placements: 10
- Winner: Kimberly Gundani (Melbourne)

Miss Grand Australia 2018 was the fourth edition of the Miss Grand Australia pageant, held on June 16, 2018, at the Sofitel Sydney Wentworth, Sydney, where a 26-year-old Zimbabwe-born law student from Melbourne, Kimberly Gundani, was announced the winner, outclassing other forty-one finalists. Meanwhile, Chloe Maddison Ryan, Jasmine Leatham, Krishna Shukla, and Alana Thomas were named the runners-up. Kimberly later represented the country at the Miss Grand International 2018 pageant in Myanmar, and was placed among the top 20 finalists.

The pageant also raised over A$50,000, which was donated to the UN Women, a United Nations entity working for gender equality and the empowerment of women.

== Candidates ==
The following is the list of the 42 candidates for the Miss Grand Australia 2018 pageant, 25 of these contestants are national finalists, while the remaining 17 contestants are wildcard entries.

Team Queensland
Team New South Wales
Team Victoria
- Amber Gifford
- Chantelle Lockett
- Jamila Winter
- Megan Buckley
- Oriana Troth
- Rachel Rogers
- Stacey de Plooy
- Tayla Pearson
- Taylor Marlene Curry
- Alana Thomas
- Brittany Quintana
- Dani Pierce
- Fiona Iorfino
- Krysta Heath
- Kymberlee Street
- Stacey Beachley
- Susanna Downes
- Valeria Sizova
- Jade Lozankoski
- Jasmine Leatham
- Kimberly Gundani
- Kirstie Lockhart
- Raquel Garach
- Shian Mason
- Simone Smith

Team Capital Territory
Team South Australia
Team Northern Territory
- Chloe Maddison Ryan
- Emily Muir
- Lorpez Togba
- Krishna Shukla
- Rachelle Seizovic
- Amelie Mewr
- Chloe Ferrari
- Isy Barisic-Bentley
- Lucy Taylor
- Natasha Leevi
- Jade Lozankoski
- Justine Griffiths

Team Western Australia
Team Tasmania
- Carla McGuire
- Kiahly Jahn
- Megan Buckley
- Nikita Peters
- Danielle Bouskila
- Karina Monaghan
- Sapir Isabella
- Tahlia Jayde
