= Miss Grand and Miss Supranational Australia 2016 =

2nd Miss Grand Australia competition, beauty pageant edition

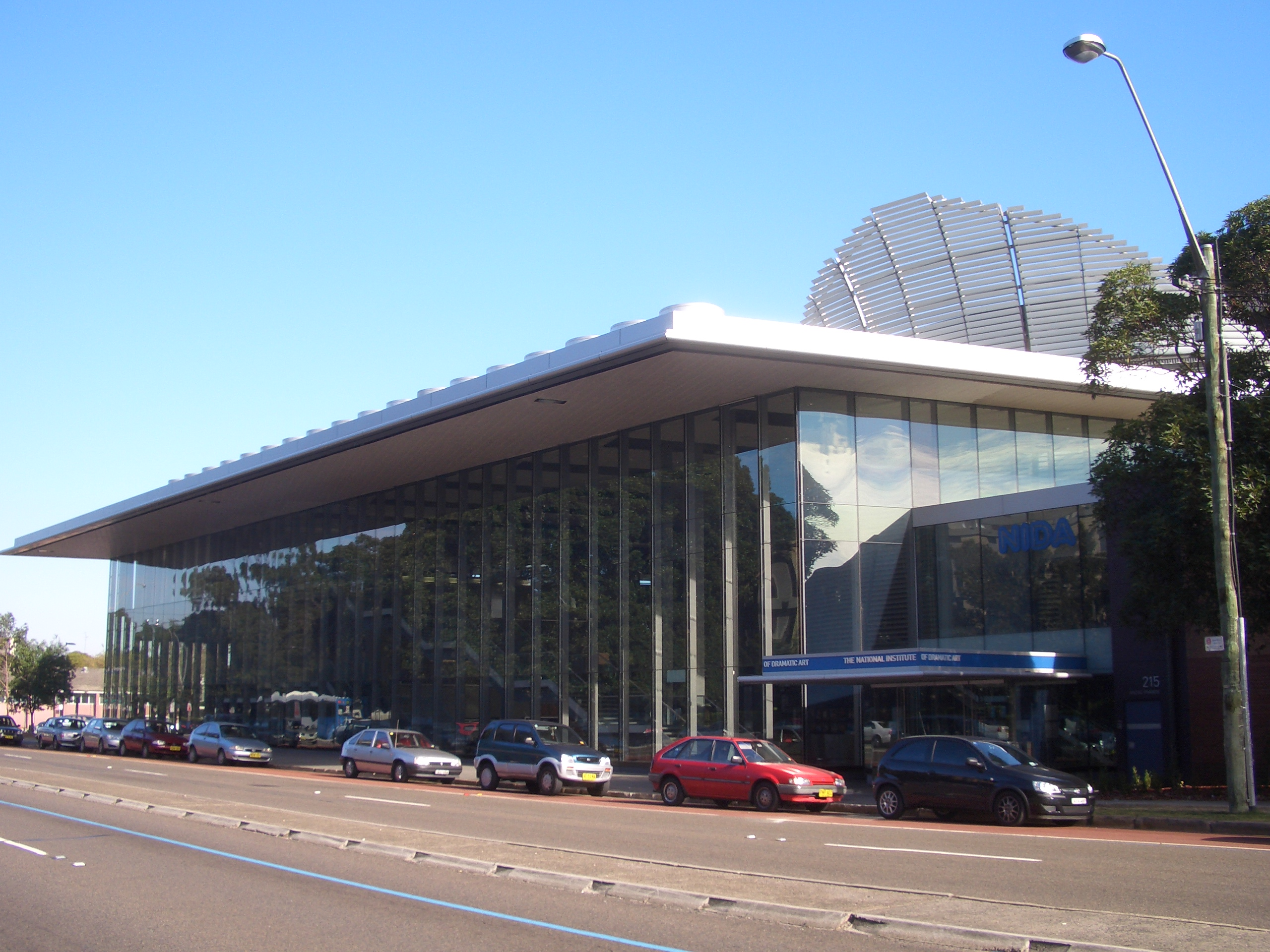
- National Institute of Dramatic Art, the venue of the contest
- Date: 14 August 2016
- Venue: NIDA Playhouse Theatre, Sydney
- Entrants: 18
- Placements: 5
- Miss Grand Australia: Dani Fitch (New South Wales)
- Miss Supranational Australia: Silka Kurzak (Queensland)

External videos
- Opening Miss Supranational & Miss Grand Australia 2016

Miss Grand and Miss Supranational Australia 2016 was an Australian beauty contest held to determine the country representatives for the Miss Grand International 2016 and Miss Supranational 2016 pageants. The event was held on 14 August 2016, at the Playhouse Theatre located in the National Institute of Dramatic Art (NIDA), Sydney. Eighteen candidates from different states and territories competed for the title, and a 27-year-old Pharmacist based in New South Wales, Dani Fitch, was named Miss Grand Australia 2016, while Silka Kurzak of Queensland was elected Miss Supranational Australia 2016.

In addition to the main winners, one of the national aspirants, Anyier Teresa Yuol of New South Wales, who finished as the first runner-up at the competition, was also appointed "Miss Grand South Sudan 2016", since she has South Sudanese descent but relocated to Australia due to the civil war in the country.

Both Dani Fitch and Silka Kurzak were respectively placed among the top 20 and 25 finalists in the international competition held in the United States and Poland, while Teresa Yuol was unplaced. Dani Fitch later became the national director of Miss Grand Australia the following year.

The following is the list of the 18 candidates for the Miss Grand and Miss Supranational Australia 2016 pageant.

Team Queensland
Team New South Wales
Team Victoria
- Kirsty Watson
- Sharnie Rudd
- Silka Kurzak
- Sofie Pringle
- Alecia McCallum
- Anyier Teresa Yuol
- Brooke Murray
- Dani Fitch
- Danielle Nyssen
- Maddison Clare
- Shianne Gibson
- Brooke Zuijdwijk
- Emily Kiara
- Jessica Parrish
- Sylwia Lewandowska
Team South Australia
- Sophie Grosser
Team Western Australia
- Alicia Van Schoonhoven
