= Miss Grand Australia 2019 =

5th Miss Grand Australia competition, beauty pageant edition

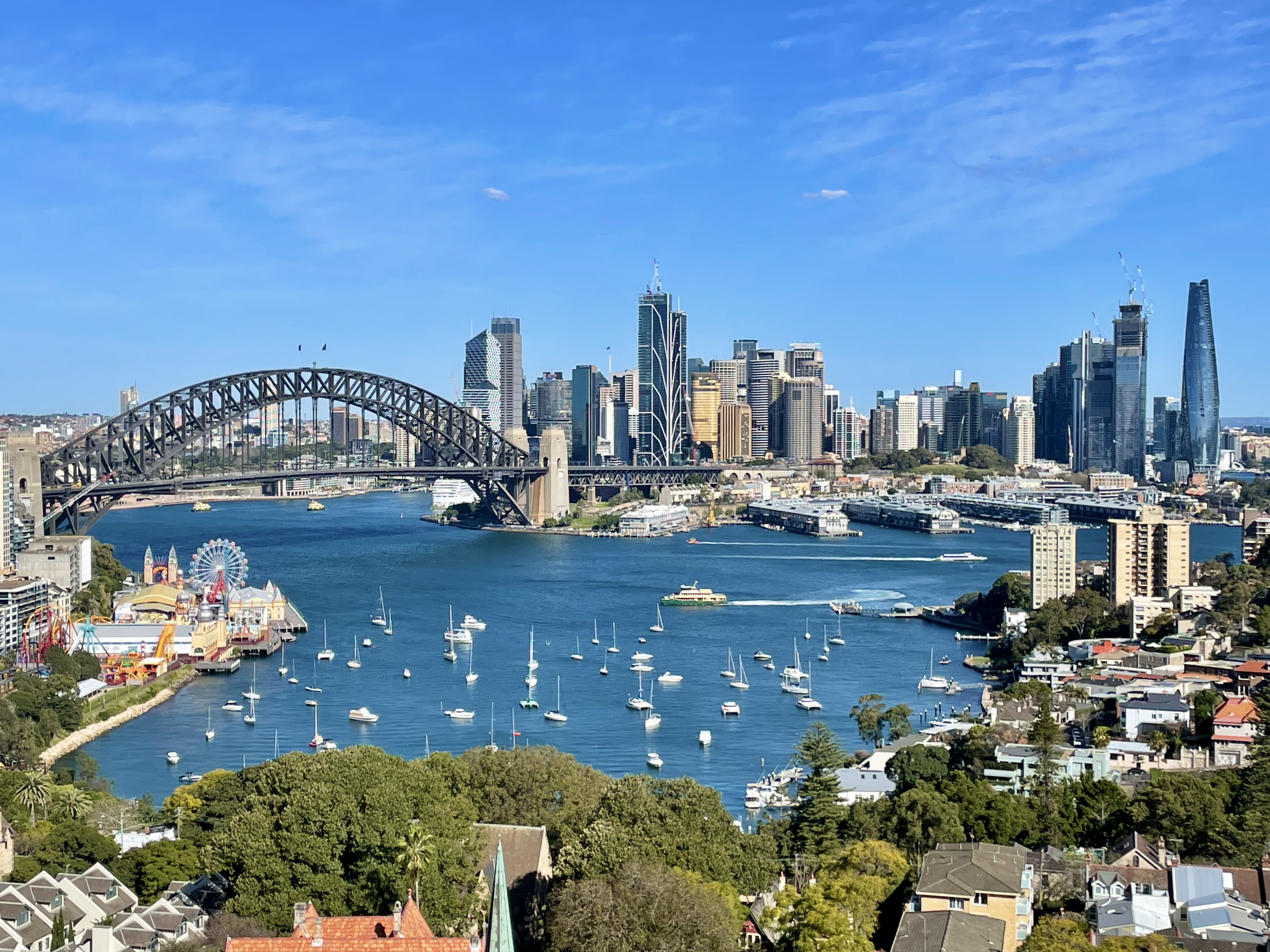
- Sydney, the host city of the contest
- Date: June 16, 2019
- Venue: Sofitel Sydney Wentworth, Sydney
- Entrants: 22
- Placements: 6
- Winner: Taylor Marlene (Gold Coast)

Miss Grand Australia 2019 was the fifth edition of the Miss Grand Australia pageant, held on June 16, 2019, at the Sofitel Sydney Wentworth, Sydney, where a 24-year-old disability support worker from Gold Coast, Taylor Marlene, was announced the winner, outclassing other twenty-one candidates. Meanwhile, Anja Christ Offersen, Lavinia Grace White, Alecia Mccallum, Jazel Alarca, and Jayde Crystal Wright were named runners-up. Taylor later represented Australia at the Miss Grand International 2019 pageant in Venezuela, and was placed among the top 10 finalists.

The following is the list of the 27 national finalists of the Miss Grand Australia 2019 pageant, Five of them withdrew before entering the final round of the pageant, making the finalized total of 22 contestants.

Team New South Wales
- Alecia McCallum
- Brihony Bonsey-Wells
- Gabrielle Guihot
- Jamila Vivienne Winter
- Jayde Crystal Wright
- Krysta Heath
- Lana Borisova
- Lavinia Grace White
- Megon Christian Nazer
- Rachel Gallagher
- Sarah Marschke
- Vivienne Barclay
- Yuan Lim
Team Queensland
- Anja Christ Offersen
- Chantelle Lockett
- Chantelle Romeo
- Hannah Howard
- Jamila Winter
- Rachelle Seizovic
- Stacey-Lee Du Plooy
- Sarika McIntosh
- Tahlia Jayde
- Tasia Hafenstein
- Taylor Curry Marlene
Team Victoria
- Tessa Budden
- Simone Smith
- Shanaaz Fourie
