= Miss Grand Australia 2017 =

3rd Miss Grand Australia competition, beauty pageant edition

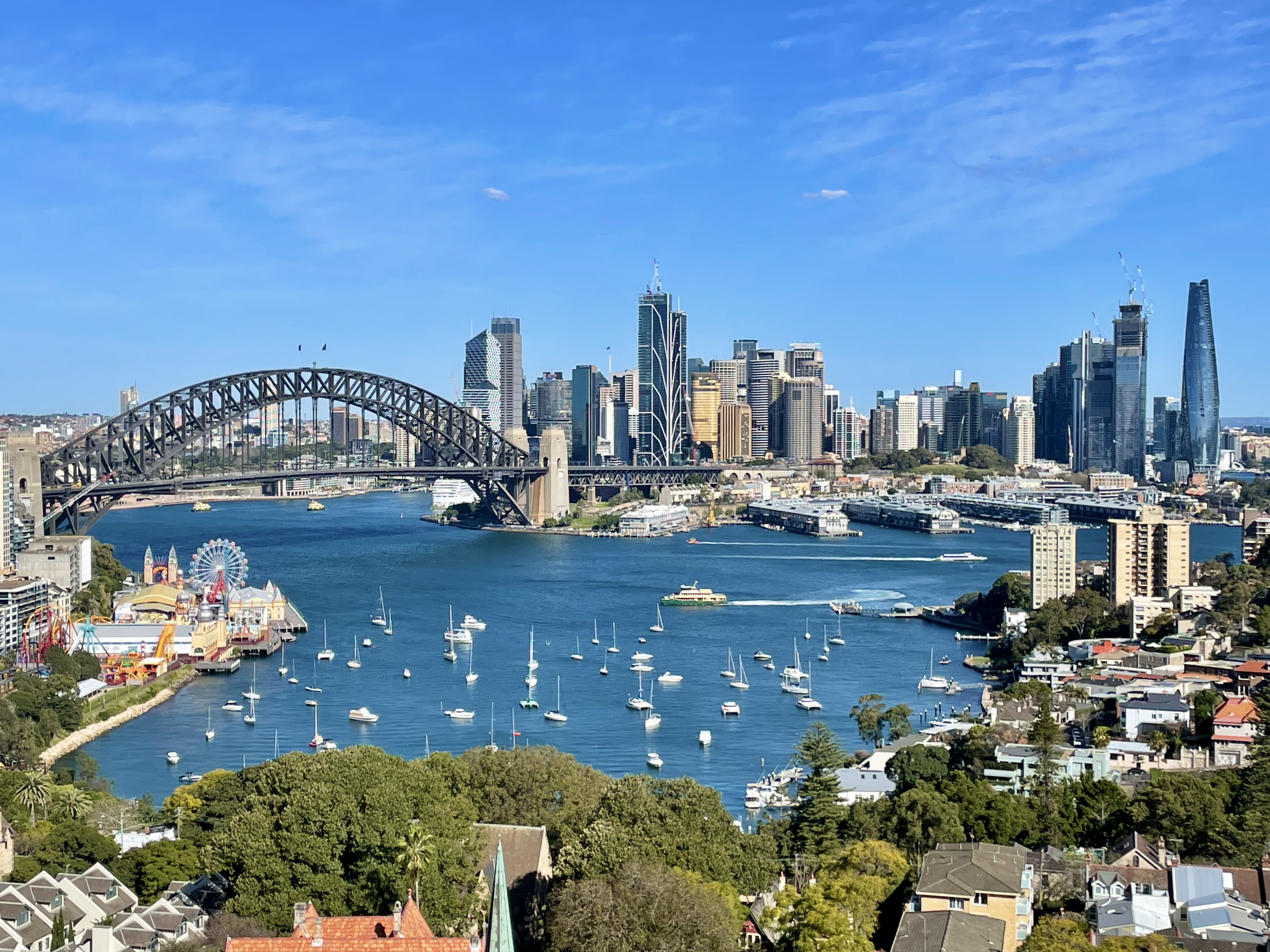
- Sydney, the host city of the contest
- Date: June 30, 2017
- Presenters: Dani Fitch
- Venue: Doltone House - Hyde Park, Sydney
- Entrants: 16
- Placements: 5
- Winner: Kassandra Kashian (New South Wales)
- Photogenic: Tahnee McGann (Queensland)

Miss Grand Australia 2017 was the third edition of the Miss Grand Australia pageant, held on June 30, 2017, at the Doltone House - Hyde Park, Sydney, where a 22-year-old model and marketing executive from the state of New South Wales, Kassandra Kashian, was announced the winner, outclassing other fifteen candidates. Meanwhile, Amelia Conway, Sophie Grosser, Maddison Clare, and Alana Thomas, were named runners-up. Kassandra later represented the country at the parent international contest, Miss Grand International 2017, in Vietnam on October 25, and was placed among the top 20 finalists.

This edition was also considered the first Miss Grand Australia contest that was organized by Dani Fitch after she took over the franchise from a former licensee, Renera Thompson.

The following is the list of the 16 national finalists of the Miss Grand Australia 2017 pageant.

Team New South Wales
Team Queensland
Team Victoria
- Alana Thomas
- Amelia Conway
- Kassandra Kashian
- Kerry-Anne Peterson
- Maddison Clare Sloane
- Olympia Hitner
- Priscilla Marie
- Samantha Mullins
- Emily Cook
- Gemma White
- Kaitlyn Walsh
- Lynaah Wangui
- Tahnee McGann
- Jessica Parish
- Sarah Pinkerton
Team South Australia
- Sophie Grosser
