= Miss Grand Australia 2023 =

7th edition of the Miss Grand Australia beauty pageant

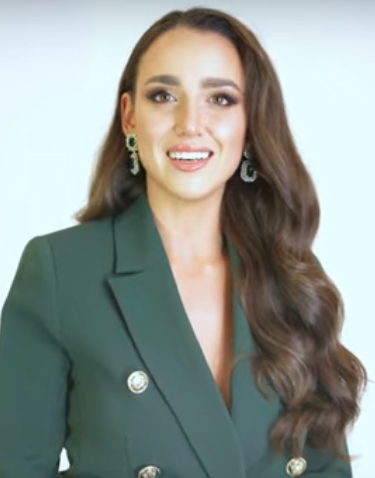
- Mikaela-Rose Fowler, the winner of the contest
- Date: 15 July 2023
- Venue: RACV City Club, Melbourne
- Broadcaster: YouTube
- Entrants: 30
- Placements: 10
- Winner: Mikaela-Rose Fowler (Victoria)

External videos
- Miss Grand Australia 2023 Grand final competition, on July 15, 2023, Youtube Video

Miss Grand Australia 2023 was the seventh edition of the Miss Grand Australia pageant, held on July 15, 2023, at the RACV City Club located in the capital of Victoria state, Greater Melbourne. Thirty candidates, who have qualified for the national pageant through an online profile screening performed from February to March, competed for the title, and a 28-year-old ADHDer and disability support worker from Victoria, Mikaela-Rose Fowler, was announced the winner. Her court consisted of four runners-up including Paitin Louise Powell 1st runner-up, Brooke Murray 2nd runner-up, Selina McCloskey 3rd runner-up, and Alecia McCallum 4th runner-up. Fowler will later represent the country at the parent international stage, Miss Grand International 2023, to be held in Vietnam on October 25.

In cooperation with Destiny Rescue, the pageant also ran as a charity event on June 4 at the Tide On The Jetty Manly in the city of Brisbane to raise funds available for rescuing children from sexual exploitation and human trafficking.

This edition was the first Miss Grand Australia contest managed by Amber Sidney after she took over the license from a former licensee, Dani Fitch, who served as the national director of the contest from 2017 to 2022.

== Result ==
| Position | Delegate |
|---|---|
| Miss Grand Australia 2023 | Victoria – Mikaela-Rose Fowler |
| 1st runner-up | Queensland – Paitin Louise Powell |
| 2nd runner-up | New South Wales Brooke Murray |
| 3rd runner-up | New South Wales – Selina McCloskey |
| 4th runner-up | New South Wales – Alecia McCallum |

== Candidates ==
Thirty candidates from seven states and territories of Australia competed for the title.

(Australian Capital Territory) Team Capital Territory
Team New South Wales
Team Victoria
- Lydia Caisley
- Krishna Shukla
- Alecia McCallum
- Amberley Mauigoa
- Brooke Murray
- Cristina Casanovi
- Kayte Keryniotis
- Letitia Walker
- Phoebe Lohrey
- Selina McCloskey
- Abi Grigsby Abigrigsby
- Anna Naseisa Ma'u Ma'ilei
- Dragana Baranov
- Francesca Valentino
- Jacquelyn Mangubat
- Lara Cunningham
- Liliane Fobbi
- Mikaela-Rose Fowler
- Nicole Wilson
- Nimesha Hewage
- Pattarawan Khraipukhiaw
- Tahlia Edmonds
- Windy Wulandari Binti Anif
Team Western Australia
- Kim Tang
- Taylor Sharpe
Team Tasmania
Team Queensland
- Kimmi Jayne
- Ariel Beninca
- Paitin Louise Powell
- Sofia Valdez
- Tori Castner
