= Miss Grand Australia 2024 =

8th Miss Grand Australia contest

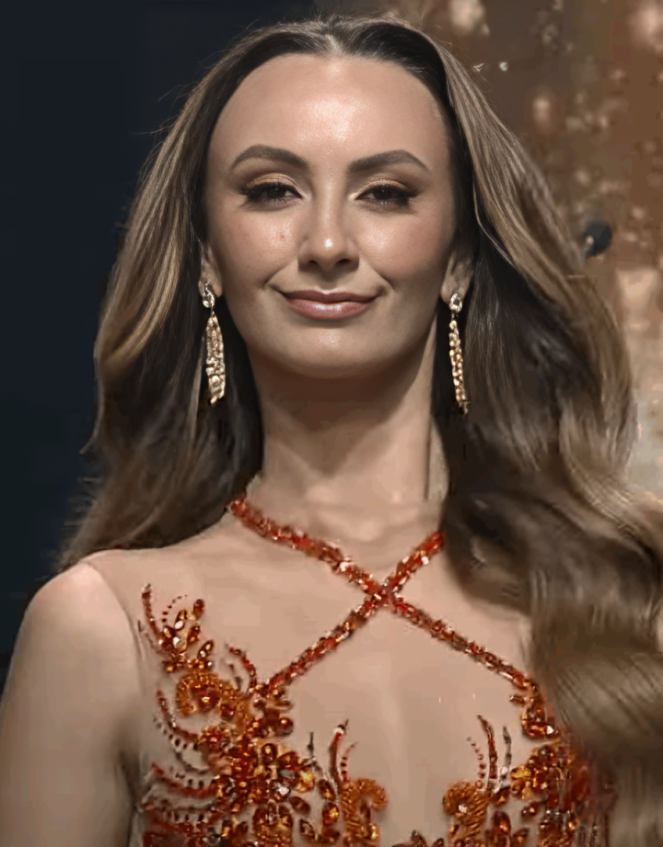
- Paitin Powell, the winner of the contest
- Date: August 3, 2024
- Venue: Sofitel Darling Harbour, Sydney
- Entrants: 21
- Placements: 10
- Winner: Paitin Powell (Queensland)
- Congeniality: Shayal Kumar (Queensland)
- Photogenic: Letitia Walker (New South Wales)

Miss Grand Australia 2024 was the 8th edition of the Miss Grand Australia pageant, held in Sydney on August 3, 2024, at the Sofitel Darling Harbour. Twenty-one contestants from 5 states and territories of Australia competed for the title. Of whom a 25-year-old registered dental nurse from Queensland, Paitin Powell, was named the winner. Paitin later represented Australia at the Miss Grand International 2024 pageant, held in Thailand on 25 October 2024, but was unplaced.

In cooperation with Destiny Rescue, all finalists were encouraged to raise funds available to support the campaign against child sexual exploitation and human trafficking. The contestant elected by the organization based on the campaign activities was awarded "Woman of Impact" and automatically qualified for the top 5 finalists.

== Result ==
Placement	Contestant
Miss Grand Australia 2024	Queensland – Paitin Louise Powell
1st runner-up	Victoria – Jada Kyle
2nd runner-up	New South Wales – Patricia Sheeran
3rd runner-up	New South Wales – Letitia Walker
4th runner-up	Western Australia – Courtney-Jade Tester
Special awards
Best in Swimwear	New South Wales – Patricia Sheeran
Best in Evening Gown	Victoria – Jada Kyle
Best in Social Media	Western Australia – Rattana Luangnan; Queensland – Paitin Louise Powell
Best in Interview	Queensland – Paitin Louise Powell
Miss Congeniality	Queensland – Shayal Kumar
Miss Photogenic	New South Wales – Letitia Walker
Miss Popularity	New South Wales – Courtney Brittle
Miss People's Choice	New South Wales – Courtney Brittle

== Contestants ==
Twenty-one contestants competed for the title; eighteen from the custom selection and three from the wild card procedure.

State/Territory	Candidate	Age (Note: Ages at the time of the pageant)
Australian Capital Territory	Alison Liu (Note: Qualified for the national round through the wild card selection system.)	26
Australian Capital Territory	Bianca Lincoln	23
New South Wales	Courtney Brittle	28
New South Wales	Letitia Walker	22
New South Wales	Natarsha Haddad	19
New South Wales	Patricia Sheeran	22
New South Wales	Rachel Tillott	23
Queensland	Annabelle Munt	19
Queensland	Annalise Laver-Megede	18
Queensland	Paitin Powell	25
Queensland	Shayal Kumar	22
Queensland	Tia Lee Jakubenko	19
Victoria	Christina Bashir	20
Victoria	Jada Kyle	24
Victoria	Jessica Menz	19
Victoria	Natalie Bauce	23
Victoria	Rozette Wozniak	19
Victoria	Windy Anif	28
Western Australia	Aurelia Dinda Prameswari	24
Western Australia	Courtney-Jade Tester	27
Western Australia	Rattana Luangnan	24
