= Grace on Coronation =

General information
- Status: Proposed
- Type: Residential
- Location: Brisbane, Australia, 600 Coronation Drive, Toowong

Design and construction
- Developer: Colliers

The Grace on Coronation is a proposed development of three residential skyscrapers located in Toowong in Brisbane, Australia. It was designed by Zaha Hadid. If completed this development will be her first work in Australia. The development will occupy a 1.5-hectare (3.7-acre) site on the banks of the Brisbane River, just four kilometres from Brisbane central business district. The site was the location of the former ABC Radio Brisbane studios and has 135 metres of river frontage.

== Original design ==
The $430 million development originally consisted of three champagne flute-shaped towers, two at 24 storeys and one at 27 storeys, which were to contain a total of 555 units. The design also incorporated the preservation of heritage-listed Middenbury House. The proposed development has received development application approval from the Brisbane City Council. Construction on the site was expected to begin by the end of 2015. This initial design featured three towers. In July 2015 a legal challenge was launched in the Planning and Environment Court to stop the project on the grounds that the aesthetic values and the views to the Brisbane River and from West End are unreasonably diminished. The original design was defeated in the Supreme Court in 2018. The building height was found to not be in compliance with Brisbane City Council’s planning scheme, which only allowed for 15 storeys on the site.

== Revised design ==
A revised design includes four towers and a public promenade that leads walkers to a riverside lookout.
