= Waterfront, New Jersey =

Waterfront, New Jersey can refer to:

- Camden Waterfront in Camden, New Jersey
- Hudson Waterfront in Hudson County, New Jersey
- Lamberton, New Jersey, also known as Waterfront, in Trenton, New Jersey
