= Waterfront City =

Waterfront City may refer to:

- Waterfront City - a precinct of Melbourne Docklands
- Waterfront City, Dubai, an area of Dubai Waterfront, currently under construction
