= Terry Jackman =

Australian businessman (born 1943)

Terry Jackman AM
- Born: Patrick Terence Jackman; 1943 (age 82–83); Brisbane, Queensland, Australia
- Education: Gregory Terrace
- Occupation: Retired
- Organization(s): Birch Carroll & Coyle, Hoyts, Tourism Queensland
- Board member of: Australian Rugby Union, Prime Television, Sunland group, SeaWorld property trust, BreakFree.
- Spouse: Jodie Jackman

Terry Jackman AM (born 1943 in Brisbane) is a retired businessman involved in media, sports, and tourism in Australia. He was the chairman of Tourism Queensland and the founder and chairman of Pacific Cinemas.

He commenced work at the age of fifteen at Birch Carroll & Coyle, where he worked for twenty years, the last five as that company's chief executive. Between 1976 and 1985, Jackman was managing director of Hoyts Theatres. After exiting Hoyts he was involved in marketing Paul Hogan's first Crocodile Dundee film and was an investor in the movie. In 1989 he established Pacific Cinemas Pty Ltd, which has interests in five complexes in Sydney, the Gold Coast, and Brisbane. He is chairman and sole proprietor of the group.

He was a non-executive director for Prime Television and the Australian Rugby Union, and non-executive chairman of Sea World Property Trust and Breakfree Resorts. In 2013, he was appointed chairman of the National Association of Cinema Operators.

Jackman received a Member of the Order of Australia (AM) in 2003, for service to the entertainment industry through film distribution and screening, to tourism development, and to the community as a fundraiser. He was awarded a Queensland Great Award by the QLD government in 2005.
