= Imperial Hotel Gold Coast =

Hotel in Gold Coast, Queensland, Australia

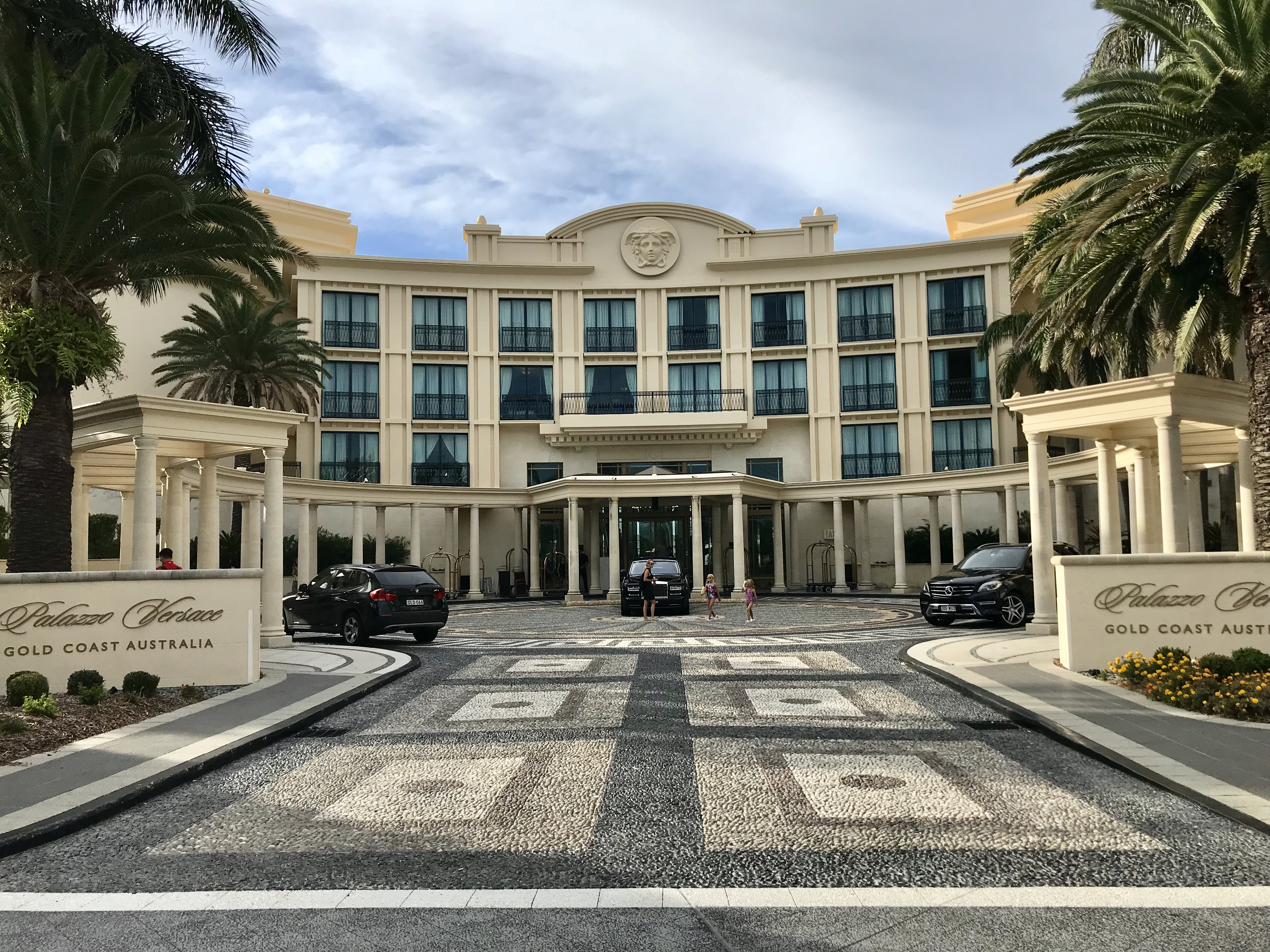

General information
- Location: 94 Seaworld Drive, Main Beach, Queensland, Australia
- Coordinates: 27.9670°S 153.4259°E
- Opened: 2000
- Owner: Nanbai Australia PTY LTD

Technical details
- Floor count: 5

Design and construction
- Architect: DBI Design
- Developer: Sunland Group Ltd

Other information
- Number of rooms: 200
- Number of restaurants: 3
- Number of bars: 2
- Parking: 300+

Website
- https://www.theimperialgc.com.au/

Imperial Hotel Gold Coast (formerly the Palazzo Versace Gold Coast) is a luxury hotel located by the Southport Broadwater in Main Beach, and Marina Mirage shopping centre at Southport Spit on the Gold Coast, Queensland, Australia. The hotel was constructed by the Sunland Group on the site of the former Fisherman's Wharf complex. Opened on September 15, 2000, the hotel features 200 rooms, 72 apartments, 600 seater ballroom, bars, restaurants and a Versace retail store.

The design and furnishing of the hotel was overseen by Versace in Milan, Italy. The building itself was created by Gold Coast architect Desmond Brook of DBI Design.

In 2023, fashion house Versace decided not to renew its branding agreement. From 1 August the new name was The Imperial Hotel.

== History ==
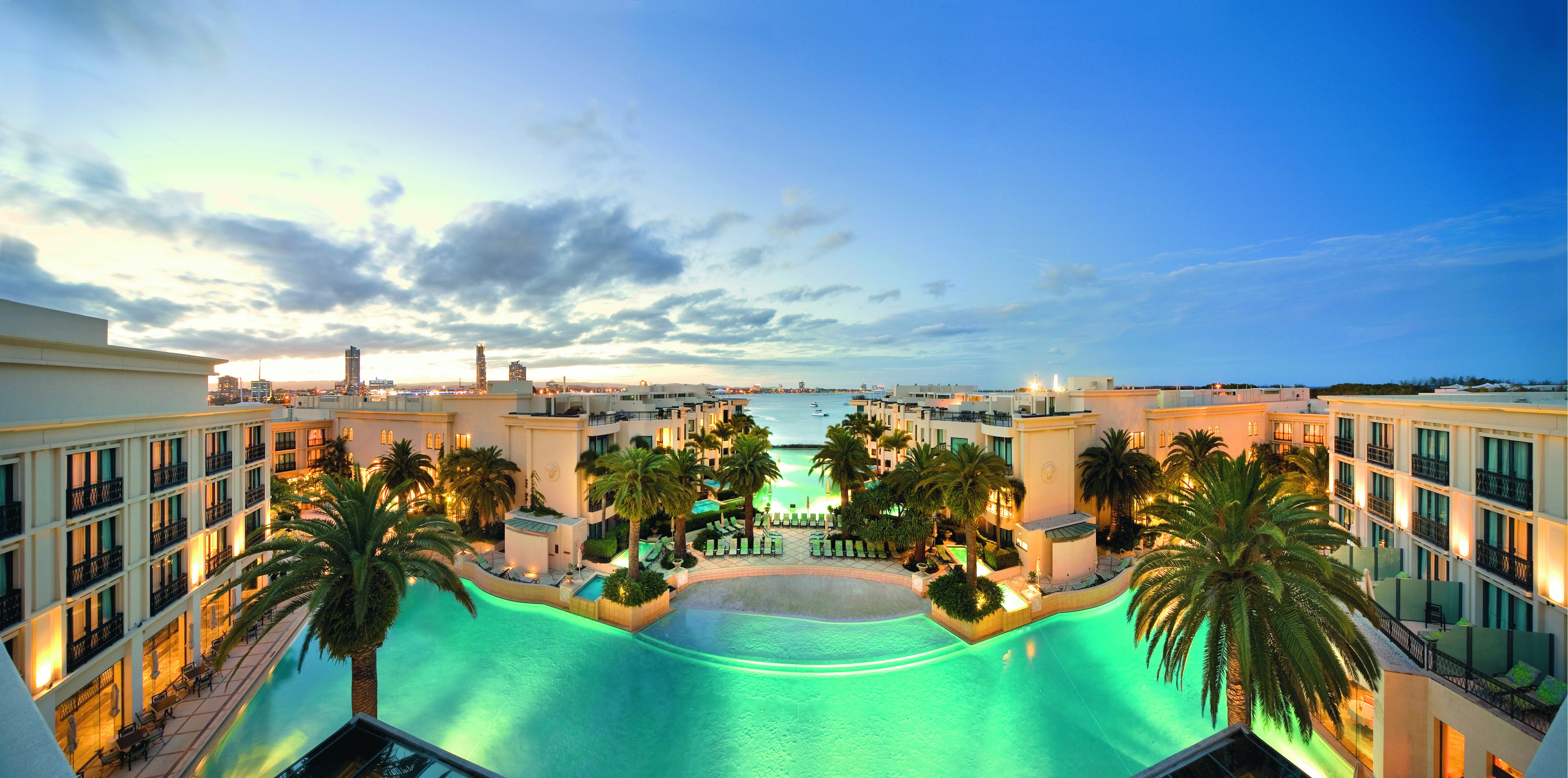
Panoramic view of the resort.

Soheil Abedian of the Sunland Group visited the House of Versace in 1997 to propose the idea of a Versace branded hotel. He claims Palazzo Versace Gold Coast to be the first fashion-branded hotel. On his reasons for approaching Versace, Abedian says "Gianni Versace was a lover of architecture in the first place, a person who used in his fashion all the elements of the Baroque style. ... Also, Versace was the only fashion house at the time that had a home collection and everything that a hotel needed from the porcelain to cutlery, pillows to fabric." The main building was designed in Postmodern architecture style in a broad interpretation of Neoclassical architecture.

In 2005, Emirates International Holdings acquired 50% of Palazzo Versace Gold Coast at the same time entering into a joint venture to develop a chain of hotels including a similar hotel in Dubai. In 2006 Maktoum bin Rashid Al Maktoum, the United Arab Emirates Vice President and Prime Minister, suffered a heart attack and died while staying at the hotel. In September 2012 a conditional contract was entered into to sell the hotel complex to a Chinese consortium.

== Hotel and condominiums ==
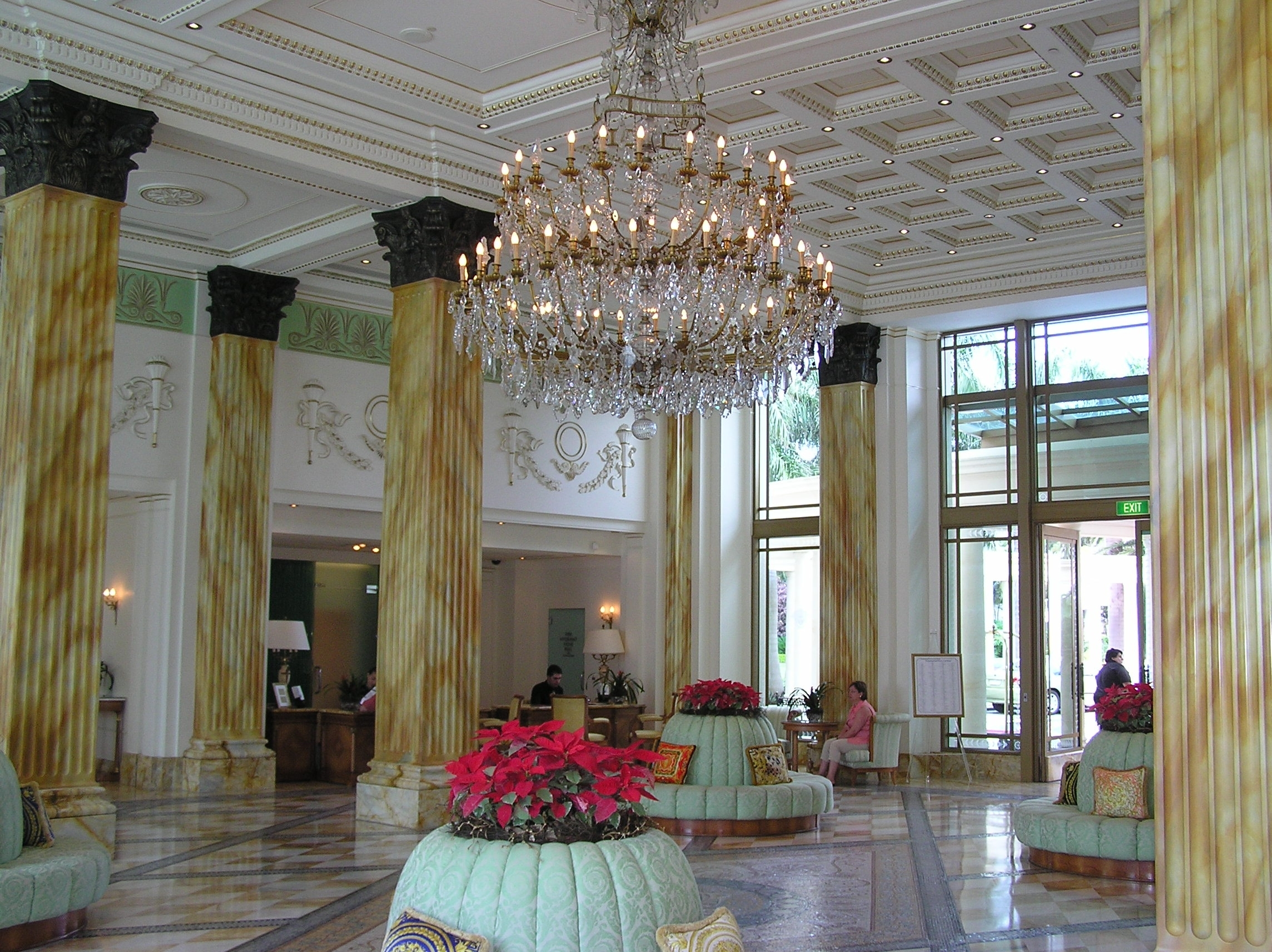
Palazzo Versace Lobby

Imperial Hotel has 200 hotel rooms and suites and seventy-two neighbouring condominiums, and four restaurants. Palazzo Versace also has its own private 90 berth marina, and underground carpark.

== Marina Mirage Shopping Centre ==
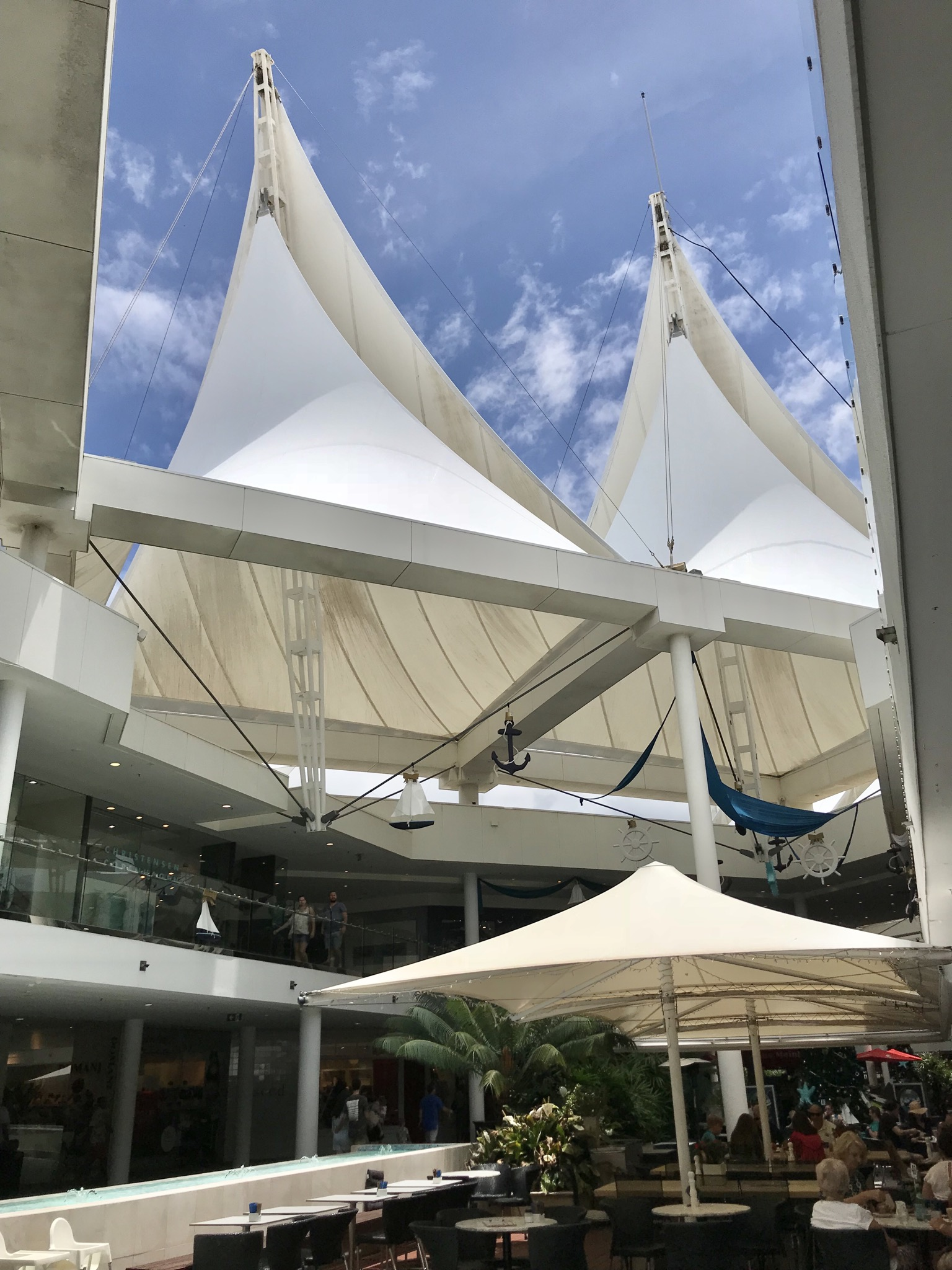
Marina Mirage Shopping Centre in Main Beach, Queensland, in 2017.

Nearby Marina Mirage was a waterfront shopping, dining and marina precinct at the Main Beach on the Gold Coast. Opened in 1988, it officially closed in November 2025 after 37 years of operation to allow a $500 million redevelopment by Makris Group. Demolition of the 1980s-era shopping centre had begun by March 2026.

== See also ==
- Tourism in Australia
