= Miglin =

Miglin may refer to:

- Lee Miglin (1924-1997), American real estate developer and business tycoon murdered by spree killer Andrew Cunanan
- Marilyn Miglin (1938-2022), American businesswoman
- Miglin v Miglin, a 2003 leading case decided by the Supreme Court of Canada on the use of separation agreements

== See also ==
- Miglin-Beitler Skyneedle, a proposed 125-floor skyscraper intended for Chicago, United States by Lee Miglin and J. Paul Beitler. Project was dropped eventually.
