= Cohasset Punch =

Historic Chicago Liqueur

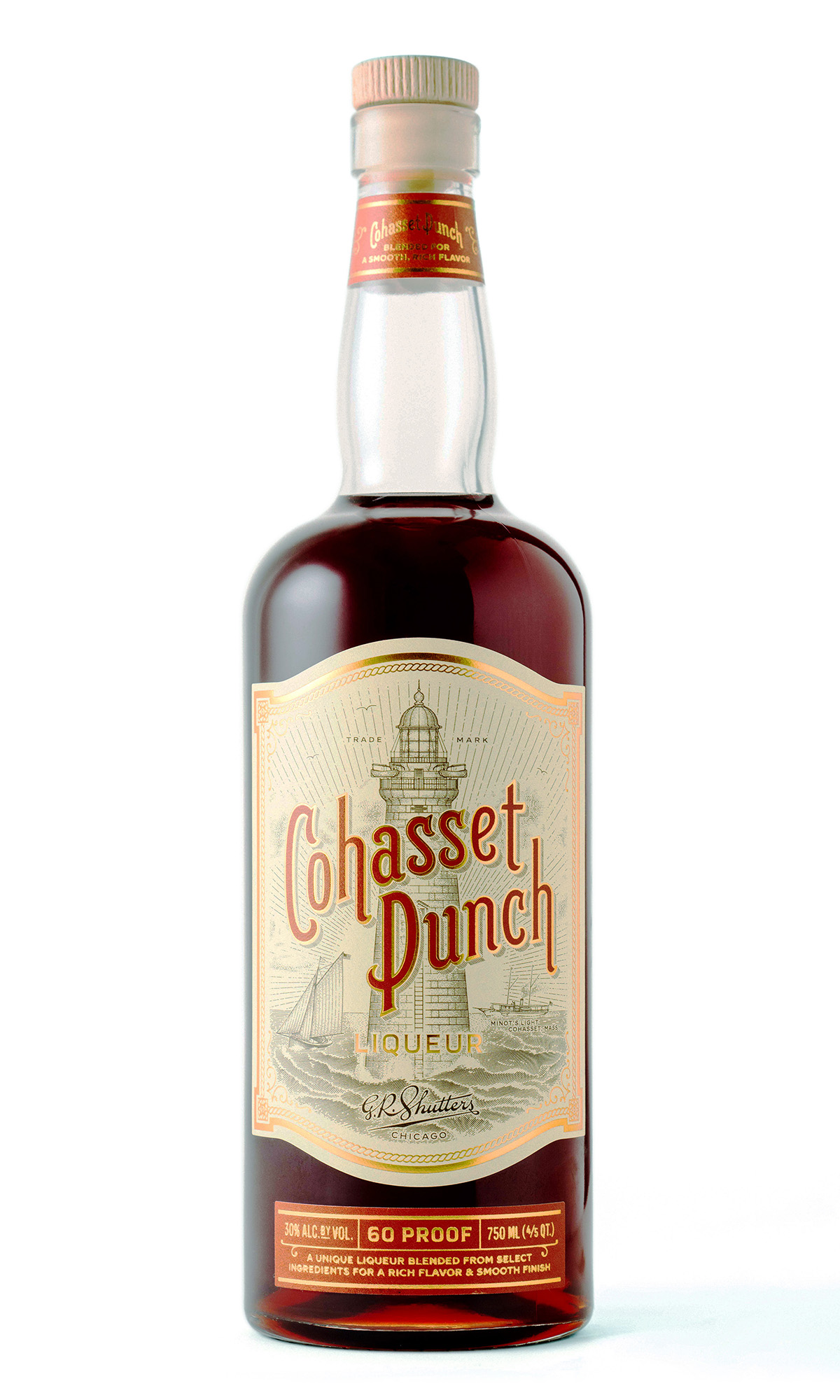
- A modern bottle of Cohasset Punch
- Type: Liqueur
- Origin: Chicago, Illinois, United States
- Introduced: 1899
- Alcohol by volume: 30%
- Proof (US): 60
- Website: cohassetpunch.com

Cohasset Punch is a brand of rum-based drink introduced in 1899. First created by Chicago bartenders Lewis A. Williams and Thomas C. Newman, Cohasset Punch was long associated with the Ladner Bros. bar on Madison Street in the Chicago Loop, who produced it until the 1980s. Though officially classified as a liqueur, Cohasset Punch can also be considered a bottled cocktail or punch, and has been referred to as "the definitive Chicago cocktail". In 2024, bottled Cohasset Punch was relaunched under new ownership.

== History ==
In the late 1890s, Chicago saloon owner and liquor dealer Lewis A. Williams (Note: Lewis Williams' name is spelled "Louis" on some records, but his death notice uses "Lewis.") was invited to spend a few weeks at the Cohasset, Massachusetts summer estate of long-time family friend, actor William H. Crane. Williams overheard some of Crane's other guests discussing rum punch, and wired Tom Newman, his business partner back in Chicago, to request a mixed drink that would "surpass anything ever before imbibed by any living soul." Within 24 hours, a cask of the new punch was loaded onto a railcar and bound for Cohasset. Upon tasting the new concoction, Crane and his guests declared Newman the "king of blenders." Crane wired Newman his thanks and asked for the name of the new drink, and Newman simply wired back the name, "Cohasset".

Williams & Newman began mixing Cohasset Punch at their saloon, (Note: The Williams & Newman saloon was located at 124 Dearborn Street (now 10 N. Dearborn after the 1911 street renumbering). Williams & Newman was located across the street from the saloon of James McGarry, the inspiration for the Mr. Dooley character in columns by humorist Finley Peter Dunne.) serving the blend over a peach slice soaked in brandy. By the fall of 1899 they were selling Cohasset Punch in bottles, with modest but nationwide distribution. From the very beginning, each bottle had an image of Cohasset's famous Minot's Ledge Lighthouse on the label. (Note: Labels from 1899 to early 1981 also included illustrations of a sailboat and steamship on either side of the lighthouse. Labels from 1981 until the end of original production replaced these with an illustration of one square-rigged tall ship to the right of the lighthouse. The modern label depicts William H. Crane’s catboat Chloe to the left of the lighthouse, and Crane’s steam yacht The Senator (designed by Edward Burgess and named for one of Crane's most successful plays).) In 1902, a leading liquor trade journal remarked that so high was the demand for Cohasset Punch in its city of origin, that "what the mint julep is to the South, Cohasset Punch is to Chicago." A recipe appeared for Cohasset Punch in cocktail guides that included sweet vermouth, New England rum, lemon juice, and orange bitters, but regulars believed that this formula did not quite taste like the original. Of the drink's smoothness compared to its 60-proof strength, a 1938 letter to the Chicago Tribune wrote that after three or four drinks, "a pleasant mellowness steals over you, your imagination glows, you discover humor you never possessed. Then suddenly you push your chair back to stand up, and lo, your legs are merely attached to your body for appearance's sake!"

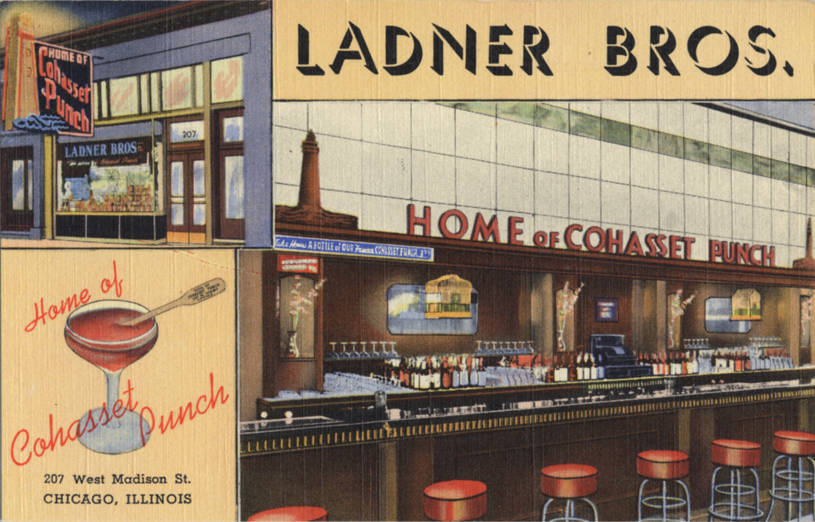
A 1940s postcard for the Ladner Bros. "Home of Cohasset Punch" bar at Madison and Wells Streets, Chicago

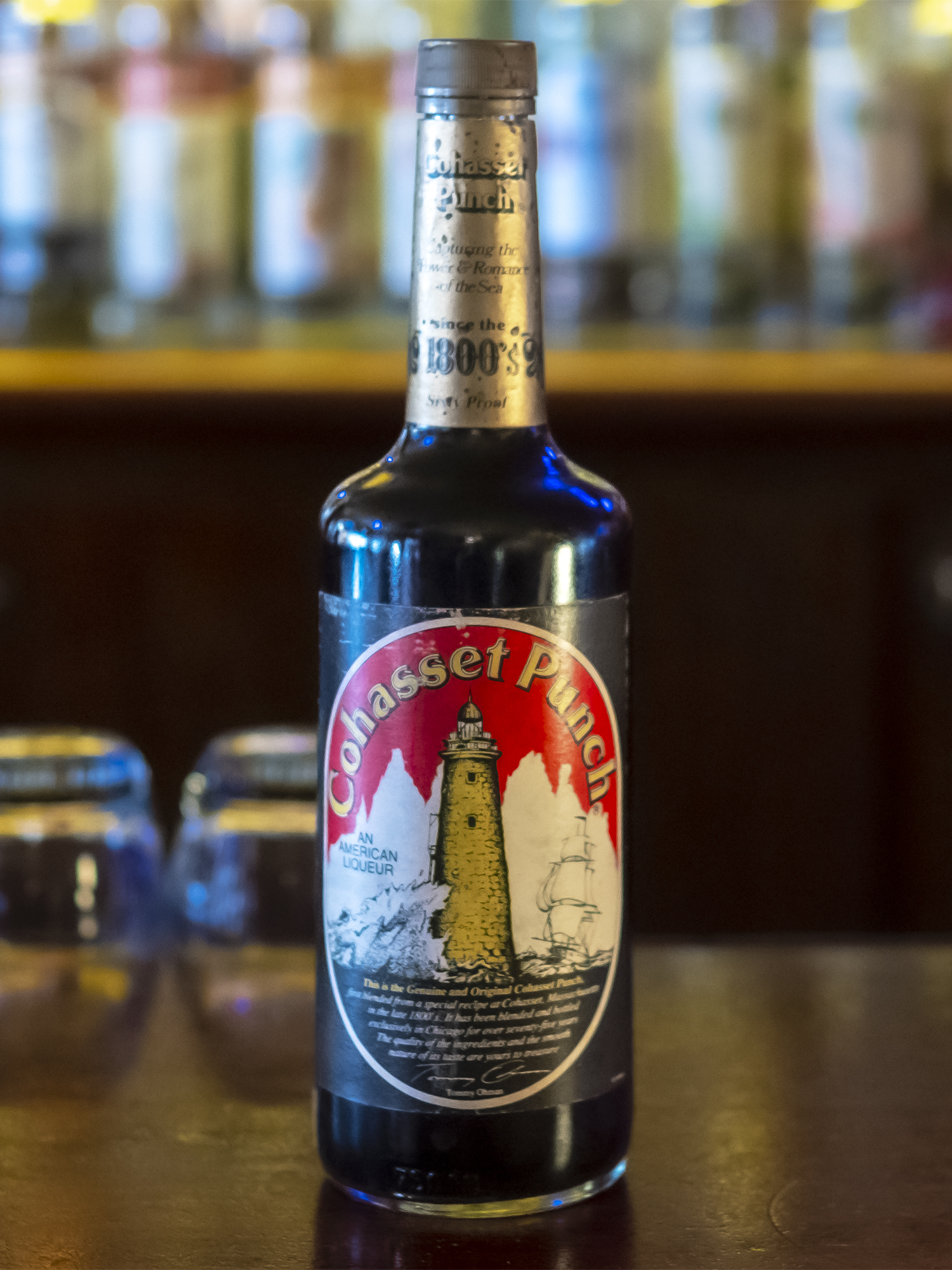
A bottle of Cohasset Punch from the mid-1980s, on display at Simon's Tavern in Andersonville, Chicago

After Williams & Newman retired in 1916, they sold the rights to Carl Ladner, who continued to serve the drink at the Ladner Bros. bar as well as bottle it for distribution. The bar reopened after Prohibition, and a large neon sign touting "The Home of Cohasset Punch" was hung outside. During the 1930s and 1940s, bottled Cohasset Punch could be found at many of Chicago's restaurants and nightclubs including Chez Paree and The Blackhawk, as well as the "Tip Top Tap" bar cars aboard the Milwaukee Road's Hiawatha passenger trains. Ladner Bros. was demolished in 1986 by developer Lee Miglin to make way for the proposed (but never built) 125-story Miglin-Beitler Skyneedle. Production of Cohasset Punch ceased shortly thereafter.

In 2024, the Cohasset Punch brand was revived by a Chicago-based cocktail history enthusiast using historical accounts of its flavor and ingredients.

== Serving ==
Historically, Cohasset Punch has been served stirred with ice and strained into a cocktail glass over a peach slice. In the early 20th century, this garnish would have likely been a peach slice preserved in brandy. In the 1970s and 1980s, Cohasset Punch was increasingly served on the rocks or with mixers. The current manufacturer suggests a number of cocktails that can be made with Cohasset Punch.

== See also ==
- List of cocktails
- List of liqueurs
- Culture of Chicago
- Swedish punsch, another bottled punch liqueur
- Jeppson's Malört, another historic spirit with Chicago heritage
