= Consortium of Universities of the Washington Metropolitan Area =

The Consortium of Universities of the Washington Metropolitan Area (the Consortium) is a nonprofit educational association of 24 colleges and universities, and the National Geographic Society, and the Smithsonian Institution in the greater Washington, D.C. metropolitan area, and was established to drive collaboration in higher education across the National Capital Region. For more than half a century, it has evolved into a powerful, unifying voice for its member institutions—locally, regionally, and nationally—and a catalyst for expanding opportunity and promoting broad-based economic and workforce development.

Founded in 1964, the consortium facilitates the processing of course cross-registration between all member universities and universalizes library access among some of its member universities. It also provides joint procurement programs, joint academic initiatives and campus public safety training.

Nine of the Consortium members have formed the Washington Research Library Consortium (WRLC). WRLC provides joint library services, student and faculty borrowing at the participating libraries, and other shared systems. Additionally, WRLC enables cooperative collection development and off-site storage services.

The Consortium Research Fellows Program is a partnership between the Consortium of Universities of the Washington Metropolitan Area and several Department of Defense agencies which allows professors and students to work in DoD settings.

== Member Universities & Colleges ==
- American University
- Bowie State University
- The Catholic University of America
- Gallaudet University
- George Mason University
- The George Washington University
- Georgetown University
- Howard University
- Marymount University
- Montgomery College
- National Defense University
- National Intelligence University
- Northern Virginia Community College
- Prince George's Community College
- Trinity Washington University
- Uniformed Services University of the Health Sciences
- University of Maryland, College Park
- University of Maryland Global Campus
- University of the District of Columbia

=== Board Leadership ===
- Chair: Irma Becerra, President, Marymount University
- Vice Chair: Anne Kress, President, Northern Virginia Community College
- Jonathan R. Alger, President, American University
- Aminta Breaux, President, Bowie State University
- Peter Kilpatrick, President, Catholic University of America
- Roberta Cordano, President, Gallaudet University, Board Chair Emerita
- Gregory Washington, President, George Mason University
- Robert Groves, (Interim) President, Georgetown University
- Ellen Granberg, President, George Washington University
- Wayne A. I. Frederick, (Interim) President, Howard University, Board Chair Emeritus
- Jermaine Williams, President, Montgomery College
- Peter Garvin, President, National Defense University
- John Ballard, President, National Intelligence University
- Falecia Williams, President, Prince George's Community College
- Patricia McGuire, President, Trinity Washington University Board Chair Emerita
- Jonathan Woodson, President, Uniformed Services University of the Health Sciences
- Maurice Edington, President, University of the District of Columbia
- Darryll Pines, President, University of Maryland
- Gregory Fowler, President, University of Maryland Global Campus
- Andrew Flagel, ex officio, President & CEO, Consortium of Universities of the Washington Metropolitan Area

== Associate Members ==
- Johns Hopkins University
- National Geographic Society
- Smithsonian Institution
- University of Virginia
- Virginia Polytechnic Institute and State University (Virginia Tech)

== Affiliate Members ==
- Shenandoah University
- Towson University

=== Partners and parent organizations of member institutions ===
- U.S. Department of Defense (DoD)
  - U.S. Army Research Institute for the Behavioral and Social Sciences
  - Air Force Research Laboratory
  - Army Research Laboratory
  - Naval Air Warfare Center Training Systems Division
  - Defense Manpower Data Center
- Office of the Director of National Intelligence (ODNI)
- U.S. Department of Health and Human Services (HHS)
