= CAIS Group =

American fintech company

Capital Integration Systems LLC
- Trade name: CAIS
- Company type: Private
- Industry: Financial services
- Founded: 2009; 17 years ago
- Founder: Matt Brown
- Headquarters: New York City, U.S.
- Key people: Matt Brown (Chairman & CEO)
- Products: Alternative investments
- Website: caisgroup.com

Capital Integration Systems LLC (doing business as CAIS) is an American fintech company that provides platform solutions related to alternative investments in the private markets.

== Background ==
CAIS was founded in 2009 by Matt Brown who previously worked in the wealth management industry. The company started out offering financial advisers access to hedge funds for minimum commitments as low as $100,000 each. Early investment managers that CAIS offered investors access to included Paulson & Co., Third Point and Goldman Sachs' Commodity Opportunities Fund.

In February 2012, CAIS partnered with Mercer to offer independent and smaller wealth advisers operational support. In June 2015, CAIS enlisted Mercer's services to help it perform due diligence services as well as providing market intelligence.

Companies that have invested in CAIS include Apollo Global Management, Franklin Templeton Investments and Eldridge Industries. In April 2022, CAIS reached unicorn status with a valuation of $1.1 billion.

In June 2024, it was reported that CAIS was cutting fees to as low as 0.05% for feeder funds that direct investors to alternative assets. It aimed to set a new industry standard that lowers fees and makes them more transparent, as part of an effort to "truly democratize alternative investments".

== Business operations ==
CAIS offers platforms that gives financial access to an investment strategies in alternative investments. CAIS partners with wealth advisers such as Fidelity Investments, Hightower Advisors, Focus Financial Partners and William Blair & Company. It has worked with hedge funds to offer their products through its platform.
