= Richard Schlesinger (journalist) =

American journalist

- Born: 1 October 1954 (age 72); New York
- Education: University of Missouri
- Occupations: News anchor, reporter, correspondent of 48 Hours
- Notable credit(s): Emmy Award, Sigma Delta Chi Award, Alfred I. duPont–Columbia University Award

Richard Schlesinger is an American retired television news reporter and correspondent for the CBS crime documentary show 48 Hours.

== Early life and education ==
Schlesinger was born in New York. He graduated from White Plains Senior High School in 1972 and graduated from The University of Missouri with a bachelor's degree in journalism in 1976.

== Career ==
After graduation in 1976, Schlesinger joined Miami-based WPLG-TV as a political reporter, where he won Sigma Delta Chi Award. In 1980, he was hired as Washington bureau chief for the Post-Newsweek Television Stations and worked there until 1984, when he joined CBS News. At CBS, Schlesinger was based in Miami and covered stories throughout the southeastern United States and South America. From 1987–1990, he was a correspondent at CBS News Northeast bureau, also working as an investigative reporter for the CBS Evening News and as a substitute anchor for morning news and weekend editions of the news.

From 1990 through 1997, he was a full-time correspondent for 48 Hours. His reports included cases of innocent Americans behind bars, marriage and divorce in 1990s and the recession of the middle class. Schlesinger reported for a two-hours CBS documentary CBS Reports: "Enter the Jury Room", for which he won Alfred I. duPont–Columbia University Award. The documentary examined the jury system in US and was given access to the actual jury deliberations for the first time in the television industry. In 1993, Schlesinger interviewed Navy officer Jeffrey Trail on the condition of anonymity as Trail gave his testimony about being gay in the military in the prelude of the don't ask, don't tell policy. Trail became known in 1997 as the first victim of spree killer Andrew Cunanan.

He received 10 Emmy Awards throughout his career. Apart from his reports to 48 Hours, Schlesinger also contributed to CBS News Sunday Morning.

He retired from CBS News in 2022.
