= David Madson (architect) =

American LGBTQ+ rights activist (1963–1997)

- Madson in an undated photo
- Born: David Jon Madson; October 16, 1963; Waterloo, Iowa, U.S.
- Died: May 2, 1997 (aged 33); Chisago County, Minnesota, U.S.
- Cause of death: Gunshot wounds
- Education: University of Minnesota
- Occupations: Architect; LGBTQ+ rights activist; HIV/AIDS activist
- Partners: Andrew Cunanan (1995–1996); Rob Davis; Cedric Rucker

David Jon Madson (October 16, 1963 – c. May 2, 1997) was an American architect and gay rights activist, widely known for being the former boyfriend and second victim of spree killer Andrew Cunanan.

== Early life and career ==
Madson was born in Waterloo, Iowa, on October 16, 1963, the son of Howard Madson and Carol Muller. He had two sisters and one brother, and grew up mostly in Barron, Wisconsin, and other locations in Wisconsin. In his high school years, Madson was involved with musical theatre and other artistic activities.

During his childhood, Madson went hunting with his father, who recalled that David was so horrified by the killing of a duck that he (Howard) had to hide the animal's body by a tree and ask another hunter to take it away. This sensitivity in Madson was noted by a college friend, Wendy Petersen, who stated that he was not a "physical person," recalling an incident in which another student mistook Madson for another person and pushed him against a wall, leaving Madson petrified. Rich Bonnin, who was also a friend of Madson, told author Maureen Orth that Madson liked to be relied on emotionally by his boyfriends but that he was not a confrontative person.

After graduating from Barron High School in 1981, Madson enrolled at the University of Minnesota Duluth the following year to study political science and communications, obtaining a bachelor's degree in the former in May 1987. In the fall of 1988, he settled in Minneapolis and began taking courses at university college and the institute of technology, subsequently joining the University of Minnesota Twin Cities in 1990 after being accepted into its School of Architecture.

Throughout the 1990s, Madson continued his studies, pursuing a master's degree in architecture while also considering studying law. He began working while still attending college, holding several positions in different jobs, including at a law firm, a restaurant, and Saks Fifth Avenue. His breakthrough as an architect came in 1996, when he joined a retail marketing company named JohnRyan Company. At JohnRyan, Madson began a successful architectural career, taking part in important projects for the firm.

For his outstanding career, Madson had received the President's Medal from the University of Minnesota in 1995, later attending advanced urban planning classes at Harvard University, with his boss John Ryan describing him as an "immensely talented person."

== HIV/AIDS activism ==
A gay man, Madson was active in the LGBTQ+ movements in Minneapolis in the 1990s. He worked on a design thesis of a memorial for HIV/AIDS victims, during the HIV epidemic. Madson named it The AIDS Memorial: A Place of Healing, basing the concept on recognizing the past, healing in the present, and learning for the future, writing that he thought that the HIV/AIDS epidemic would "leave lasting effects."

Madson was supportive of DIFFA, an AIDS charity, and was deeply moved by the New York City AIDS Memorial, taking a personal interest in designing a similar memorial for Minneapolis. His project was named by a NAMES Project AIDS Memorial Quilt note.

== Relationship with Cunanan ==
Madson had met Andrew Cunanan in November 1995, around the same time that he met Jeffrey Trail, Cunanan's first victim and friend of Madson too. Cunanan dated both men, keeping a friendship with them after the end of their romantic relationships. In an extensive report by Maureen Orth of Vanity Fair, Orth states that Cunanan was dining with friends at a restaurant in San Francisco when he saw Madson drinking alone and sent him a drink on his behalf, asking Madson to join the group afterward. Cunanan's friends said that the two men spent a "nonsexual sleepover" at Cunanan's room in the Mandarin Oriental.

Between November 1995 and July 1996, Madson maintained a long-distance relationship with Cunanan, growing frustrated over time at Cunanan's lies and pretentions. Friends of Madson reported after his murder that several of Cunanan's friends, including one in common (Jeffrey Trail) warned him of Cunanan's "pathological lying." Given that Cunanan was receiving a monthly payment of $2,000 (equivalent to $4,106 in 2025) from a millionaire named Norman Blachford, it is probable that he wanted to hide his relationship with Madson to avoid losing the money. During their relationship, Cunanan went to Minnesota in April 1996, and Madson visited California as late as May 1996.

The collapse of the relationship between Madson and Cunanan came in July 1996, when Cunanan failed to go to Minnesota to spend the Fourth of July with Madson. After the breakup, Cunanan grew infatuated with Madson, telling Jeffrey Trail's boyfriend that Madson was "the love of (my) life, the man (I) want to marry." Cunanan's friends also stated that around that time, he kept a picture of Madson on his refrigerator. In the weeks leading up to Cunanan's first crime, between Valentine's Day and Easter of 1997, Orth says that he proposed to Madson, telling a friend that Madson had rejected him.

After separating from Cunanan, Madson had two boyfriends, who were aware, as well as many of his friends, of Madson's apprehension at Cunanan's visits to Minneapolis. In November 1996, Rob Davis, Madson's then-boyfriend, pushed Cunanan against a wall and warned him against harassing Madson. Madson's boyfriend after Davis, Cedric Rucker, also stated that Madson felt uncomfortable by Cunanan's presence.

== Murder ==
In April 1997, Cunanan travelled to Minneapolis and stayed with Madson, who reluctantly accepted him as a guest at his apartment. Cunanan met Madson's friends, who asked one of them what they thought of Cunanan, to which they described Cunanan as "flashy" and "big-spending."

On April 26, 1997, the second night of his visit to Minneapolis, Cunanan stayed at Trail's apartment while Trail was out of town with his boyfriend Jon Hackett. Upon returning to Minneapolis, they found neither Cunanan nor his belongings, with Trail telling Hackett that he needed to have a "pretty important" conversation with Cunanan. On April 27, Trail went to see Cunanan at Madson's apartment, entering the building at 9:45 p.m. Cunanan had phoned Trail, asking him to come fetch his gun, which Cunanan had stolen when he stayed at the apartment the previous night. When Trail arrived, Cunanan attacked him with a hammer and killed him in front of Madson, placing his body behind a sofa and rolled in a rug.

When police found Trail's body and knew of the relationship with Madson, they suspected that Madson had killed him. Police sergeant Robert Tichich of the Minneapolis Police Department stated to Vanity Fair that, at the time, there was no possibility to connect it to Cunanan. It is believed that Madson (presumably as a hostage) stayed with Cunanan at the apartment for two nights after Trail's murder. Neighbors of Madson saw him with Cunanan on the elevator and walking Madson's dog without a leash on April 29. Madson's neighbors took note of this detail because Madson always used a leash to walk his dog.

On May 2, Cunanan and Madson were seen eating lunch together north of Minneapolis and driving Madson's Jeep. The following day, fishermen found Madson's body in a lake in Rush City, Minnesota, with gunshot wounds in the back and between his eyes. Then Sheriff of Chisago County, Minnesota, Randall Schwegman told Los Angeles Times that "(Madson) knew it was coming", though it was reported that Madson had "no reason to fear" Cunanan before Trail's murder, which probably shocked him. Until the finding of his body and Cunanan's suicide and FBI investigation, police falsely believed that Madson might have been involved in Cunanan's crimes.

Cunanan would continue his killing spree, murdering businessman Lee Miglin in Chicago, William Reese in Pennsville Township, New Jersey, and fashion designer Gianni Versace in Miami, subsequently killing himself there on July 23, 1997.

== Aftermath and in media ==
Madson's thesis was certified by the University of Minnesota after his death, and he was posthumously awarded a master's degree in architecture in May 1998. He was buried in the Wayside Cemetery in Barron, Wisconsin, and he is memorialized by pavers in the Garden of Seasons in Loring Park, Minneapolis.

Madson was portrayed by Matt Servitto in the 1998 film The Versace Murder and by Australian actor Cody Fern in the 2018 Netflix series American Crime Story's second season The Assassination of Gianni Versace: American Crime Story.
