= The Versace Murder =

1998 film by Menahem Golan

- DVD cover
- Directed by: Menahem Golan
- Written by: Menahem Golan; Bill Mesce Jr. (uncredited)
- Produced by: Stuart Goldstein; Sam Lupowitz; Charles Rosenberg; Robert L. Street
- Starring: Franco Nero; Steven Bauer
- Cinematography: William G. Randall
- Edited by: Michael Yanovich
- Music by: Claudio Simonetti
- Production companies: Splash Films; Pan Am Pictures
- Release date: 1998
- Running time: 102 minutes
- Country: United States
- Budget: $4,000,000

The Versace Murder is a 1998 film written and directed by Menahem Golan and starring Franco Nero and Steven Bauer.

== Premise ==
Spree killer Andrew Cunanan (Shane Perdue) leaves a trail of murder victims as he travels from San Francisco to Miami, finally killing world-famous fashion designer Gianni Versace (Franco Nero). The film recounts Cunanan's life before and after the murder, including details on his four other victims and his efforts to evade a nationwide manhunt that would end in his suicide.

== Principal cast ==
- Franco Nero as Gianni Versace
- Steven Bauer as FBI Agent John Jacoby
- Shane Perdue as Andrew Cunanan
- Matt Servitto as David Madson
- David Wolfson as Jeffrey Trail
- Oscar Torre as Antonio D'Amico
- Mario Ortiz as Fernando Carreira
- David Anthony Pizzuto as Chief William Roberts
- Dania Deville as Donatella Versace
- Renny Roker as Barnie Rogers

== Home media ==
The film was released on DVD in Region 1 in 2005.
