= Lee Miglin =

American real estate developer (1924–1997)

- Born: Lee Albert Miglin; July 12, 1924; Westville, Illinois, U.S.
- Died: May 4, 1997 (aged 72); Chicago, Illinois, U.S.
- Cause of death: Multiple stab wounds
- Occupations: Real estate developer, business tycoon, philanthropist
- Spouse: Marilyn Klecka (m. 1959)
- Children: 2

Lee Albert Miglin (July 12, 1924 – May 4, 1997) was an American businessman. After starting his career as a door-to-door salesman and then broker, Miglin became a successful real estate developer. He was an early developer of business parks. His firm, at one point, proposed the construction of the Miglin-Beitler Skyneedle, which was planned to be the tallest building in the world. Miglin was murdered in his home in May 1997 as part of a murder spree by Andrew Cunanan.

== Life and career ==
Miglin was born in Westville, Illinois and was one of seven children born to a Roman Catholic family of Lithuanian descent. His father was a Czech immigrant who worked as a Central Illinois coal miner and also owned a tavern, ice cream parlor, and soda distributorship.

Miglin trained as an air cadet during World War II, before attending the University of Illinois.

Miglin began his professional career selling silverware door-to-door and pancake batter out of the trunk of his car. After this, he sold frozen cheesecakes, and subsequent to that sold TV dinners. He quit his salesman job to spend a six month trip across Europe. After this, he decided to make an effort to go into real estate to make substantial money.

In 1956, at the age of 31, Miglin began his real estate career. In the early 1960s, he took a job as a broker with Chicago real estate magnate Arthur Rubloff. At Arthur Rubloff & Co., Miglin would first get involved with warehouse construction, later moving into office development. One of the projects he was involved in was the development of the first two of the three towers at the President's Plaza office complex near Chicago's O'Hare International Airport. Miglin would later develop the third tower in 1985 with his firm Miglin-Beitler. Miglin was regarded as an early developer of business park developments. He worked at Rubloff & Co. for 25 years.

Miglin formed a successful real estate development partnership with J. Paul Beitler, who had also worked at Rubloff & Co. Together, they founded the firm Miglin-Beitler Developments in 1982. Among the projects developed by the firm were Madison Plaza (200 West Madison), 181 West Madison Street, and Oakbrook Terrace Tower (the tallest building in Illinois outside of Chicago). In the late-1980s, they built a Helmut Jahn-designed building in Chicago that housed the headquarters of Chocolat Suchard's United States division. In addition to constructing developments, the firm also managed properties.

In 1983, it was announced that Miglin would alongside Erich Bitter co-head Bitter Automobile of America, a newly-launched American division of Bitter Automotive headquartered in Chicago. Miglin and Bitter introduced an American variant of the Bitter SC to the United States market. The cars were sold through Buick dealerships. However, few Buick dealerships agreed to sport Bitter signage, which resulted in low sales that doomed the venture.

In 1988, Miglin-Beitler Developments unveiled plans to construct a 1,999 ft (609 m) 125-floor skyscraper in Chicago to be called the Miglin-Beitler Skyneedle. This would have been the tallest building in the world at the time of its planned completion. However, the building was never built, with plans faltering during a 1990 downturn of Chicago's downtown office market. Miglin-Beitler had held hopes of resurrecting the project, but these hopes would be dashed by Miglin's murder.

After Miglin-Beitler Developments began shifting its focus away from development and towards property management in the 1990s, Miglin gradually withdrew from the daily operations but still remained involved in the company.

Miglin was a well-regarded figure in Chicago and was known for his philanthropy.

== Personal life ==
In 1959, Miglin married 20-year-old Marilyn Klecka, a Roman Catholic of Czech descent. Klecka, a successful entrepreneur known as the Queen of Makeovers, established a prominent perfume and cosmetics company and appeared on the Home Shopping Network. Miglin and his wife had two children together: Marlena (born 1968) and Duke Miglin (born 1971). Their son would become an actor. In the late 1970s, Miglin joined his wife in conducting an independent two-year study of perfume when she was first considering launching her own fragrance line.

Miglin was an automobile collector, collecting vintage cars. Miglin was a licensed pilot, and owned more than one private aircraft, as well as a helicopter.

Miglin contributed more than $100,000 to Richard M. Daley's successful campaign in the 1989 Chicago mayoral election.

== Death ==
Miglin was murdered on May 4, 1997, by the serial killer Andrew Cunanan. Miglin's body was found in the garage of his home in Chicago's Gold Coast Historic District. He had been bound at the wrists, and his head was bound with tape, with only a breathing space under his nostrils. He had been tortured with a saw and a screwdriver, his ribs had been broken, he had been beaten and stabbed, and his throat had been slit with a gardener's bow saw. Cunanan was already wanted in Minneapolis for murdering his friend Jeffrey Trail and his own ex-lover David Madson a few days earlier.

== Legacy ==
Miglin-Beitler Developments merged in 1998 with the New York City real estate Howard and Edward Milstein to form the Chicago-based firm Miglin Beitler Real Estate (MBRE). In 2022, it was announced that Houston-based Transwestern was acquiring the firm. Some of the properties developed by Miglin are today managed by Miglin Properties, LLC.

=== In popular culture ===
The second season of the anthology television series American Crime Story (titled The Assassination of Gianni Versace), recounted the Cunanan spree. It included appearances by Miglin, portrayed by Mike Farrell. This portrayal was based on Vulgar Favors: Andrew Cunanan, Gianni Versace, and the Largest Failed Manhunt in U.S. History by Maureen Orth, who speculated that Miglin may have been a closeted bisexual man in a secret relationship with Cunanan. The Miglin family has refuted this story, and has insisted that there was no relationship of any kind between Miglin and Cunanan. When the Federal Bureau of Investigation had investigated whether Cunanan might have known Miglin or a relative of Miglin's prior to the crime, they were unable to establish any such link between Miglin and Cunanan.

== See also ==
- List of homicides in Illinois
