= Hightower Advisors =

American wealth management firm

Hightower Advisors, LLC
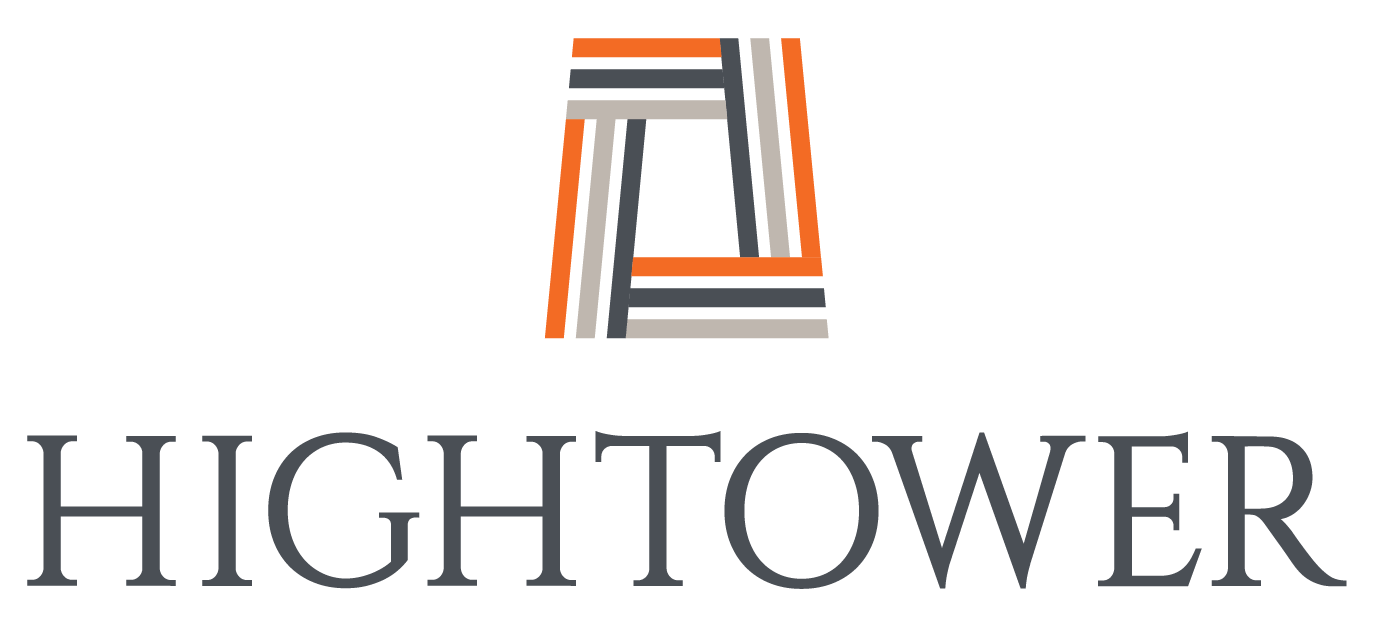

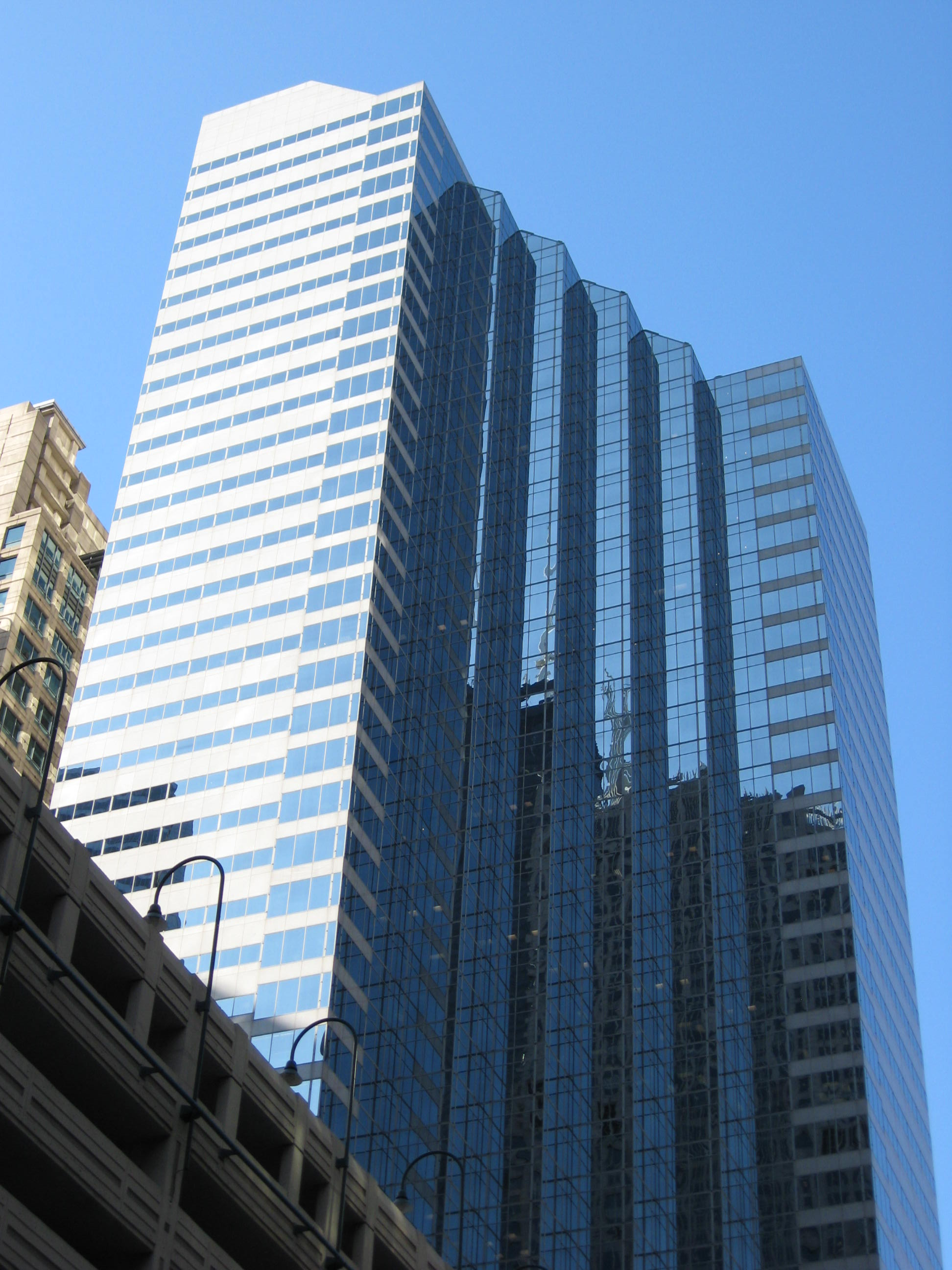
- Headquarters at 200 West Madison
- Company type: Private
- Industry: Financial services
- Founded: 2007; 19 years ago
- Founders: Elliot Weissbluth; Larry Koehler; Daniel Lidawer; Drew Kornreich
- Headquarters: 200 West Madison, Chicago, Illinois, United States
- Number of locations: 138 (Sep 2023)
- Key people: Bob Oros (Chairman & CEO)
- Products: Wealth management
- AUM: US$350 billion (Sep 2025)
- Owner: Thomas H. Lee Partners
- Number of employees: 1,700 (2023)
- Website: hightoweradvisors.com

Hightower Advisors (Hightower) is an American financial planning and investment advisory firm headquartered in Chicago, Illinois. In 2023, Barron's ranked it as No. 2 on its Top 100 Registered investment adviser (RIA) Firms list.

== Background ==
Hightower was co-founded in 2007 by Elliot Weissbluth, Larry Koehler, Daniel Lidawer and Drew Kornreich. The firm was founded for broker-dealer advisors who wanted to move to an independent firm that still received the support of a big firm but without the negative press and conflicts of interest of needing to recommend products that their employer required them to sell. The idea came to mind when Weissbluth who was president of U.S. Fiduciary Services previously, met with a broker who complained about his big firm and wanted to go independent but couldn't. Weissbluth got funding from executives of firms such as Charles Schwab Corporation and Morgan Stanley. Advisors who joined Hightower would not be restricted to a specific platform or product group so they could focus on acting in the best interest of the client. In addition although the compensation was slightly less, they would be entitled to part of Hightower's equity. As a result, once Hightower launched team from firms such as Morgan Stanley, Merrill, UBS and JPMorgan Chase joined it and business quickly grew . The aim was to get the revenue first and then build the infrastructure underneath it. When creating the firm's name, the founders chose HighTower since it sounded different from the names of large broker-dealers and the tagline, "An unobstructed view" had already been chosen.

While the firm grew quickly, it encountered various challenges on the way. Turnover among its top executives was high and there were lawsuits with competing firms due to this. Hightower has sued advisors for taking confidential proprietary information to their new firm and likewise has advisors that have been sued by competitors for the same reason. Some partners decided to go their own way thinking it was more lucrative. The environment had also become more competitive making fundraising harder. For example, one of its competitors, Dynasty Financial Partners offered even more independence and rewards to its advisors over Hightower. As a result, by 2013, Hightower's partnership business model began to stall out so it pivoted to its own outsourced platform business and began to buy RIAs outright. However rivals such as Focus Financial Partners and United Capital were also competing in the same area and had more experience in M&A compared to Hightower.

In 2015, Hightower stated that it could become a publicly traded company in two years time.

In 2017, Thomas H. Lee Partners (THL) acquired a majority stake in Hightower for $350 million. As the RIA business was evolving, THL decided to exert more control over Hightower. After putting in another $100 million to recapitalize HighTower, it changed the management of Hightower. Weissbluth who had been CEO of Hightower was replaced by Bob Oros although he remained as the firm's chairman. In December 2020, THL worked with Coller Capital, Neuberger Berman and Goldman Sachs to recapitalize HighTower again with the deal size being between $700 million and $800 million. Weissbluth then ceded the title of chairman to Oros and cashed out from firm which ended his relationship with it. Several executives of Hightower also left.

In recent years, Hightowers has made a series of acquisitions of RIAs.

In October 2023, Hightower announced it would be cutting its workforce by 5%.

In December 2023, it was reported that THL was pursuing a sale of its majority stake in HighTower.
