= Michael D. Smith (government) =

American government official

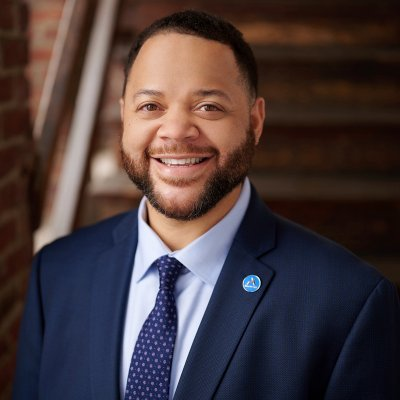

8th CEO of AmeriCorps
- In office December 2021 – January 20, 2025
- President: Joe Biden
- Preceded by: Barbara Stewart
- Succeeded by: TBD

Director of the Social Innovation Fund
- In office July 2013 – October 2014
- President: Barack Obama

Personal details
- Education: Marymount University (BA)

Michael D. Smith is an American executive who was chief executive officer of AmeriCorps from 2021 to 2025.

== Education ==
Smith earned a Bachelor of Arts degree from the Marymount University.

== Career ==
Smith began his career as an intern and later congressional aide to Congressman Richard Neal. Later he joined the National Crime Prevention Council running the youth symposiums. Later he worked at various nonprofits including the Massachusetts Boys and Girls Club, Beaumont Foundation of America, and PowerUP. Smith next spent nearly a decade at the Case Foundation as the senior vice president for social innovation.

=== Obama Administration ===
In July 2013, Smith joined the Obama Administration as the director for the Social Innovation Fund. Later, in October 2014, he became special assistant to the President and senior director of Cabinet Affairs for My Brother's Keeper (MBK) until the end of the administration.

Smith then joined the Obama Foundation continuing his work on the program as the executive director of the MBK Alliance & director, youth opportunity programs.

=== Biden Administration ===
Smith was nominated by President Biden as CEO of AmeriCorps in June 2021. He was confirmed by the Senate in December 2021.

Government offices
Preceded by Barbara Stewart	CEO of AmeriCorps; 2021–present	Incumbent
