= Fred J. Eckert =

American politician (born 1941)

Fred Eckert
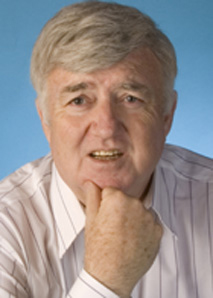

United States Ambassador to the United Nations Agencies for Food and Agriculture
- In office May 7, 1987 – January 11, 1989
- President: Ronald Reagan
- Preceded by: Millicent Fenwick
- Succeeded by: Gerald Monroe

Member of the U.S. House of Representatives from New York's 30th district
- In office January 3, 1985 – January 3, 1987
- Preceded by: Barber Conable
- Succeeded by: Louise Slaughter

United States Ambassador to Tuvalu
- In office July 22, 1982 – May 7, 1984
- President: Ronald Reagan
- Preceded by: William Bodde
- Succeeded by: Carl Edward Dillery

United States Ambassador to Kiribati
- In office May 31, 1982 – May 7, 1984
- President: Ronald Reagan
- Preceded by: William Bodde
- Succeeded by: Carl Edward Dillery

United States Ambassador to Tonga
- In office April 15, 1982 – May 7, 1984
- President: Ronald Reagan
- Preceded by: William Bodde
- Succeeded by: Carl Edward Dillery

United States Ambassador to Fiji
- In office February 25, 1982 – May 7, 1984
- President: Ronald Reagan
- Preceded by: William Bodde
- Succeeded by: Carl Edward Dillery

Member of the New York Senate from the 54th district
- In office January 1, 1973 – February 11, 1982
- Preceded by: James E. Powers (redistricting)
- Succeeded by: William M. Steinfeldt

Personal details
- Born: Fred James Eckert; May 6, 1941 (age 85) Rochester, New York, U.S.
- Party: Republican
- Spouse: Karen Eckert
- Children: 3, including Cindy
- Education: University of North Texas (BA)

Fred James Eckert (born May 6, 1941) is an American politician and diplomat who served as a member of the United States House of Representatives from New York's 30th congressional district for one term. A friend and political ally of Ronald Reagan, Eckert had previously served as the U.S. ambassador to Fiji, Tonga, Kiribati, and Tuvalu.

== Early life and career ==
Eckert was born in Rochester, New York, and grew up in Greece, New York He earned a Bachelor of Arts degree from the University of North Texas, where he majored in government and minored in both history and journalism.

== Career ==
He worked as a journalist for the Richardson Daily News while attending college. He was also a contributing editor to The New Guard, the magazine of Young Americans for Freedom. As a college student, he sold two magazine articles, one to Writer's Digest about lessons he had learned from Bruce Catton, the other to Family Weekly, about billionaire H. L. Hunt, with whom he later conducted a Playboy interview.

Following college and his marriage to his college sweetheart, Karen Laughlin, he served as assistant director of mass communications for the Catholic Foreign Mission Society of America and was recruited to join the public relations staff of General Foods, at its White Plains, New York headquarters. While living in the New York City, area he took advanced courses in advertising, public relations and television scriptwriting at New York University and at The New School for Social Research.

Returning to Rochester, he joined the area's largest advertising and public relations agency as an account executive working on Kodak and Mobil accounts. At age 27, he was elected town supervisor of Greece, New York.

In 1972, Eckert was elected to the New York State Senate, defeating incumbent Democrat James E. Powers.

=== Ambassador to Fiji ===
Eckert resigned as state senator when President Ronald Reagan appointed him U.S. ambassador to Fiji. In the position, Eckert also managed diplomatic relations with Tonga, Kiribati, and Tuvalu. Eckert and Reagan had become friends years earlier when Eckert was the only New York State Republican officeholder to endorse Reagan when he challenged President Gerald Ford in the 1976 Republican Party presidential primaries.

=== U.S. House of Representatives ===
Congressional Quarterly ranked Eckert as the member of Congress most supportive of President Reagan and Reader's Digest ran a profile feature portraying him as an example of the sort of "gutsy" leader unintimidated by special interests that Washington needs. In May 1966, the Oxford University Union selected Eckert to debate the British's government Shadow Minister for Foreign Affairs on how best to counter international terrorism; Eckert was criticized by newspapers in his district for arguing at Oxford that state-sponsored terrorism needed to be regarded as acts of war as opposed to mere violations of laws and dealt with by effective military force. His one major break with the Reagan administration was his vote in opposition to the Immigration Reform and Control Act of 1986, which Eckert viewed as rewarding illegal immigrants who broke US immigration law and encouraging more of the same in the future. Reagan later said his signing that bill into law was a mistake.

Following Eckert's defeat for re-election, President Reagan appointed him U.S. ambassador to the Food and Agriculture Organization in Rome, Italy.

=== Later career ===
He resigned as US ambassador and returned from Rome to the United States and private life to accept an offer from the Government of Fiji to be a strategic advisor after the 1987 Fijian coups d'état. Fiji's prime minister publicly praised his work as "invaluable." He also did other consulting work and teamed up with a friend to develop real estate subdivisions.

In retirement, Eckert, who as a public official had always written his own speeches, newspaper columns and newsletters and occasionally authored magazine and newspaper feature articles and op-eds for The Wall Street Journal and Outdoor Life.

He wrote the Reader's Digest profile about a then little-known computer entrepreneur named Michael Dell also authored the Digest's iconic "Unforgettable" tribute to his friend and mentor Bruce Catton, a friendship that had developed when as a 15-year-old Eckert had called to Catton's attention a couple minor historical errors in This Hallowed Ground while it was the number one best-selling book in the country. His early age interest in, and knowledge about, history and government was such that the nuns who operated Saint Charles Borromeo Elementary School had him teach eighth grade social studies to his fellow eighth-graders.

He is also author/photographer of two coffee table books on Fiji – Fiji: Pacific Paradise and Fiji: Some Enchanted Islands – and one on Tonga – Tonga: The Friendly Islands. A semi-professional photographer, his images have also appeared in books, magazines, advertisements, encyclopedias, postcards and travel brochures throughout the world and have won awards in competitions.

== Personal life ==
Eckert and his wife, Karen, live in Raleigh, North Carolina. They have three grown children, including Cindy Eckert, and four grandchildren.

U.S. House of Representatives
Preceded by Barber Conable	Member of the U.S. House of Representatives from New York's 30th congressional district 1985–1987	Succeeded by Louise Slaughter
Diplomatic posts
Preceded by William Bodde	United States Ambassador to Fiji; United States Ambassador to Kiribati; United States Ambassador to Tonga; United States Ambassador to Tuvalu; 1982–1984	Succeeded by Carl Edward Dillery
Preceded by Millicent Fenwick	United States Ambassador to the United Nations Agencies for Food and Agriculture; 1987–1989	Succeeded by Gerald Monroe
U.S. order of precedence (ceremonial)
Preceded by John LeBoutillier as Former U.S. Representative	Order of precedence of the United States as Former U.S. Representative	Succeeded by David A. Levy as Former U.S. Representative
