= Marilyn Miglin =

American entrepreneur (1938–2022)

- Born: Marilyn Klecka; October 18, 1938; Chicago, Illinois, U.S.
- Died: March 15, 2022 (aged 83); Chicago, Illinois, U.S.
- Spouse: Lee Miglin (m. 1959; died 1997)
- Children: 2

Marilyn Miglin (née Klecka; October 18, 1938 – March 14, 2022) was an American entrepreneur, inventor, and longtime host on the Home Shopping Network. She has been referred to as the "Queen of Makeovers".

Miglin garnered significant media attention as the widow of Lee Miglin, a business tycoon and philanthropist who was murdered in 1997 by the spree killer Andrew Cunanan.

== Biography ==
Born Marilyn Janice Klecka in Chicago, Illinois to Frank & Helen Klecka, she was a model and dancer in Chicago.

Miglin started her beauty company and boutique in June 1963 on Oak Street, which grew to become a cosmetics empire. She created more than 36 fragrances and perfumes through Marilyn Miglin Cosmetics. She appeared on the Home Shopping Network for over 25 years, and her business's worth is estimated at over 50 million dollars. Miglin served on Chicago Mayor Richard M. Daley's special committee on tourism, as an officer of the Chicago Convention, the State of Illinois Board of Economic Development, and on the board of directors of the John F. Kennedy Center for the Performing Arts.

Miglin was an advocate for individuals who are facially disfigured and burn survivors. She was a founding member of the University of Illinois' advisory board for the craniofacial center.

== Personal life ==
In 1959, she married Lee Miglin. He was murdered on May 4, 1997, by the spree killer Andrew Cunanan.

At the time of Miglin's murder, the couple had been married for 38 years. They had two children: Marlena (born 1968) and actor Duke Miglin (born 1971). Miglin remarried two years after Lee's death, in 1999. Her second husband died only months after the wedding.

== Honors ==
The City of Chicago designated "Marilyn Miglin Way" as the honorary name of Oak Street's shopping district.

Miglin was a recipient of the Raoul Wallenberg Award and the Best Face Forward Award. In 1998, the City of Chicago proclaimed April 15 as "Marilyn Miglin Day".

== In popular culture ==
Miglin was portrayed by Judith Light in the 2018 miniseries The Assassination of Gianni Versace: American Crime Story. Light garnered critical acclaim and a nomination for the Primetime Emmy Award for Outstanding Supporting Actress in a Limited Series or Movie for her performance.

== Death ==
Marilyn Miglin died on March 14, 2022, at her home in Chicago surrounded by her family at the age of 83 from complications of a stroke.
