= Marymount University =

Catholic university in Arlington County, Virginia, US

Coordinates: 38.905°N 77.129°W

- Former name: Marymount Junior College (1950–1960) Marymount College of Virginia (1960-1986)
- Motto: Tua Luce Dirige
- Motto in English: "Direct Us by Thy Light"
- Type: Private research university
- Established: April 26, 1950; 76 years ago
- Religious affiliation: Roman Catholic (Religious of the Sacred Heart of Mary)
- Academic affiliations: ACCU; CUWMA; CIC; NAICU
- Endowment: $43 million
- President: Irma Becerra
- Faculty: 162 full-time/201 part-time
- Students: 4,302 (fall 2025)
- Undergraduates: 1,869
- Postgraduates: 1,464
- Location: Arlington County, Virginia, U.S.
- Campus: 21 acres (8.5 ha); Suburban
- Colors: (Royal blue and white)
- Nickname: Saints
- Sporting affiliations: NCAA Division III – Atlantic East
- Mascot: Bernie The Dog
- Website: marymount.edu

Marymount University is a private Catholic research university with its main campus in Arlington County, Virginia, United States. It was founded as Marymount Junior College in 1950. Marymount offers bachelor's, master's and doctoral degrees. It has approximately 4,400 students enrolled, representing fifty states and seventy countries.

== History ==
Marymount was founded in 1950 by the Religious of the Sacred Heart of Mary (RSHM) as "Marymount College," a two-year women's school. It was a member school of the Marymount colleges operated by the sisterhood in several states. The campus was located on the former estate of Admiral Presley Marion Rixey, naval surgeon general and personal physician to presidents Theodore Roosevelt and William McKinley.

Marymount became a four-year college in 1973. It added master's degree programs in 1979, and its first doctoral program, the clinical Doctor of Physical Therapy, in 2005. Its first male students were admitted into the nursing program in 1972, and the college became fully coeducational and changed its name to "Marymount University" in 1986.

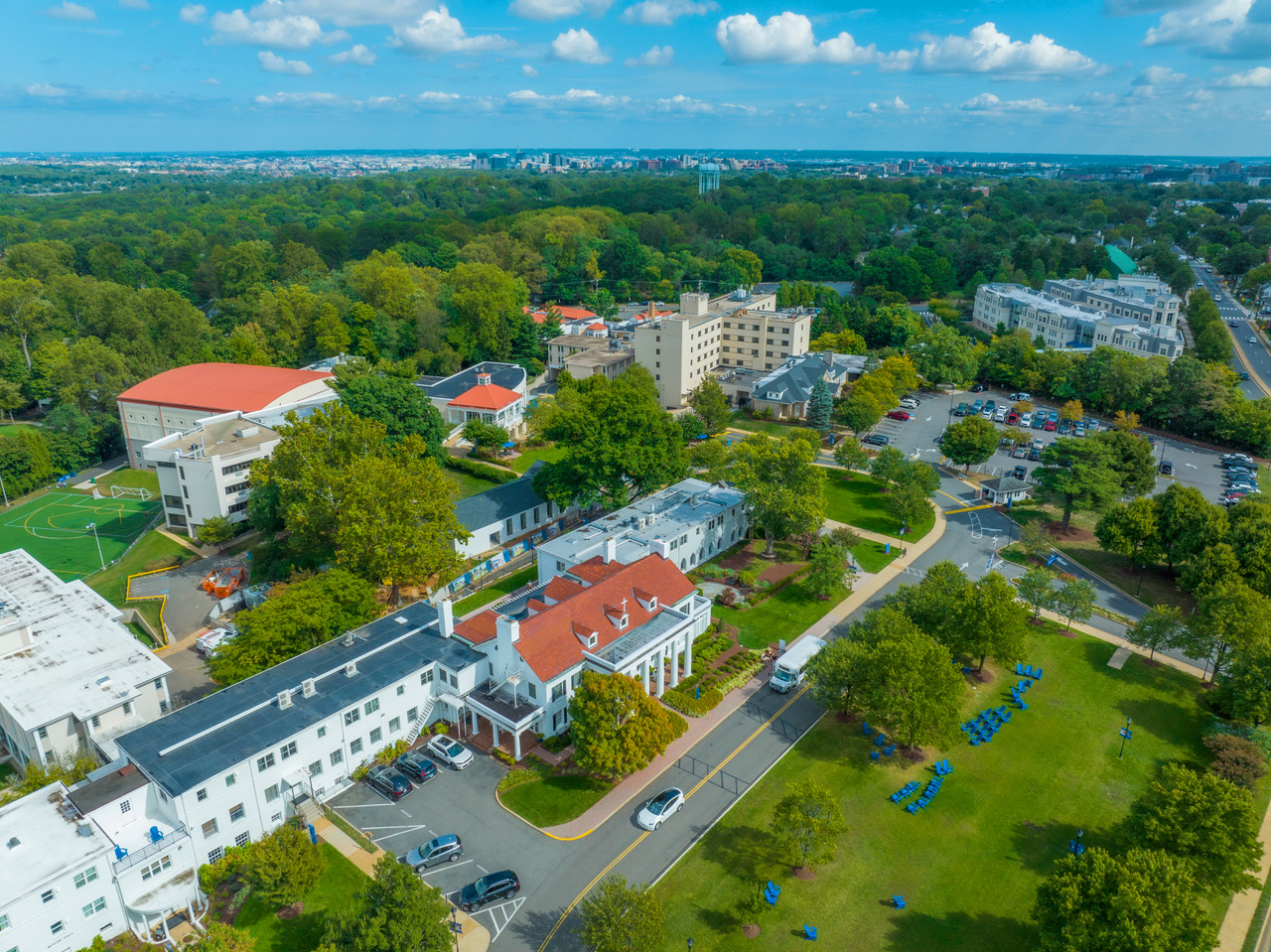
Marymount's main campus on Glebe Road, Arlington, Virginia (2024)

In October 2010, Marymount celebrated its sixtieth anniversary with the opening of Caruthers Hall, a 52,000-square-foot (4,800 m^{2}) academic facility focused on the sciences and health sciences, and Rose Benté Lee Ostapenko Hall, a 77,000-square-foot (7,200 m^{2}) residence hall providing apartment-style housing for 239 students. The Malek Plaza is a gathering area between the two buildings and features a statue of Sister Majella Berg, RSHM, who was president of Marymount from 1960 to 1993.

In August 2017, Marymount opened the Ballston Center. The LEED Gold Certified multi-use complex comprises a nine-story academic office tower and Placemaker Marymount Ballston, a twelve-story student housing/extended stay hotel, each boasting multi-level underground parking. Ballston Center is anchored by a public plaza and the Reinsch Pierce Family Courtyard.

When Irma Becerra became president in 2018, she introduced a strategic plan focused on innovation, student outcomes, and regional engagement. During her presidency, Marymount University appeared for the first time in national rankings published by U.S. News & World Report and Forbes. In 2025, the institution received Carnegie classifications as both a research university and an opportunity university, joining a group of thirty-three institutions with both designations.

Becerra also initiated a $50 million fundraising campaign associated with the university’s seventy-fifth anniversary, aimed at supporting student scholarships, facility improvements, and endowed faculty positions. The university was designated a Hispanic-serving institution during President Becerra’s tenure.

== Academics ==
Marymount University is accredited by the Southern Association of Colleges and Schools Commission on Colleges to award doctoral, master's and bachelor's degrees. It is classified by Carnegie as a "doctoral/professional universit[y]." The university's academic programs are organized into three colleges: Business, Innovation, Leadership and Technology; Health and Education; and Science and Humanities.

Marymount is a member of the Consortium of Universities of the Washington Metropolitan Area, which allows students to take courses at any of the other seventeen member institutions and to borrow books from their libraries.

=== Liberal arts program ===
In fall 2023, the Marymount Board of Trustees approved an academic restructuring that phased out eight undergraduate majors: art, English, history, philosophy, mathematics, sociology, secondary education, and theology and religious studies, along with one MA program. The decision was part of a broader review of academic offerings aimed at aligning programs with student interest and long-term institutional priorities.

Former director of the School of Humanities Ariane Economos spoke to local news on television channel WTTG (FOX5), stating, "If they want to change the mission, then say that and say what that change is ... But getting rid of theology and religious studies at a Catholic university, that doesn’t fit with the mission."

The university stated that the program changes were based primarily on enrollment trends and academic demand. According to Marymount spokesperson, the adjustments were intended to support a more sustainable academic portfolio and to strengthen areas of growth in alignment with the university’s mission and strategic plan.

== Campuses ==
=== Main campus ===
Marymount's main campus is located on twenty-one acres in north Arlington, Virginia. The campus includes six residence halls: Rose Benté Lee Ostapenko Hall, Rowley Hall, Butler Hall, St. Joseph's Hall, Berg Hall, and Gerard Phelan Hall; three academic buildings: Rowley Academic Center, Caruthers Hall, and Gailhac Hall; St. Joseph's Hall computer labs; the Rose Benté Lee Center, which includes two gyms, Bernie's Cafe, mail facilities, and recreational and meeting spaces; the Gerard Phelan Cafeteria; the Emerson G. Reinsch Library and Auditorium; the Lodge; Ireton Hall; the Administration Building; the Chapel of the Sacred Heart of Mary; and a synthetic-turf practice field. In 2023, the first Amazon Just Walk Out store on any university campus in the U.S. was established in the Gerard Hall lobby, and Ireton Hall is being renovated to create a new Campus Hub.

=== Ballston Center ===
The primary, modern facility of Marymount University's College of Business, Innovation, Leadership, and Technology is located in the Ballston neighborhood of Arlington, south of main campus. Across the courtyard, Placemakr Marymount Ballston offers space for student residential apartment housing as well as extended stay hotel rooms.

=== 4040 Center ===
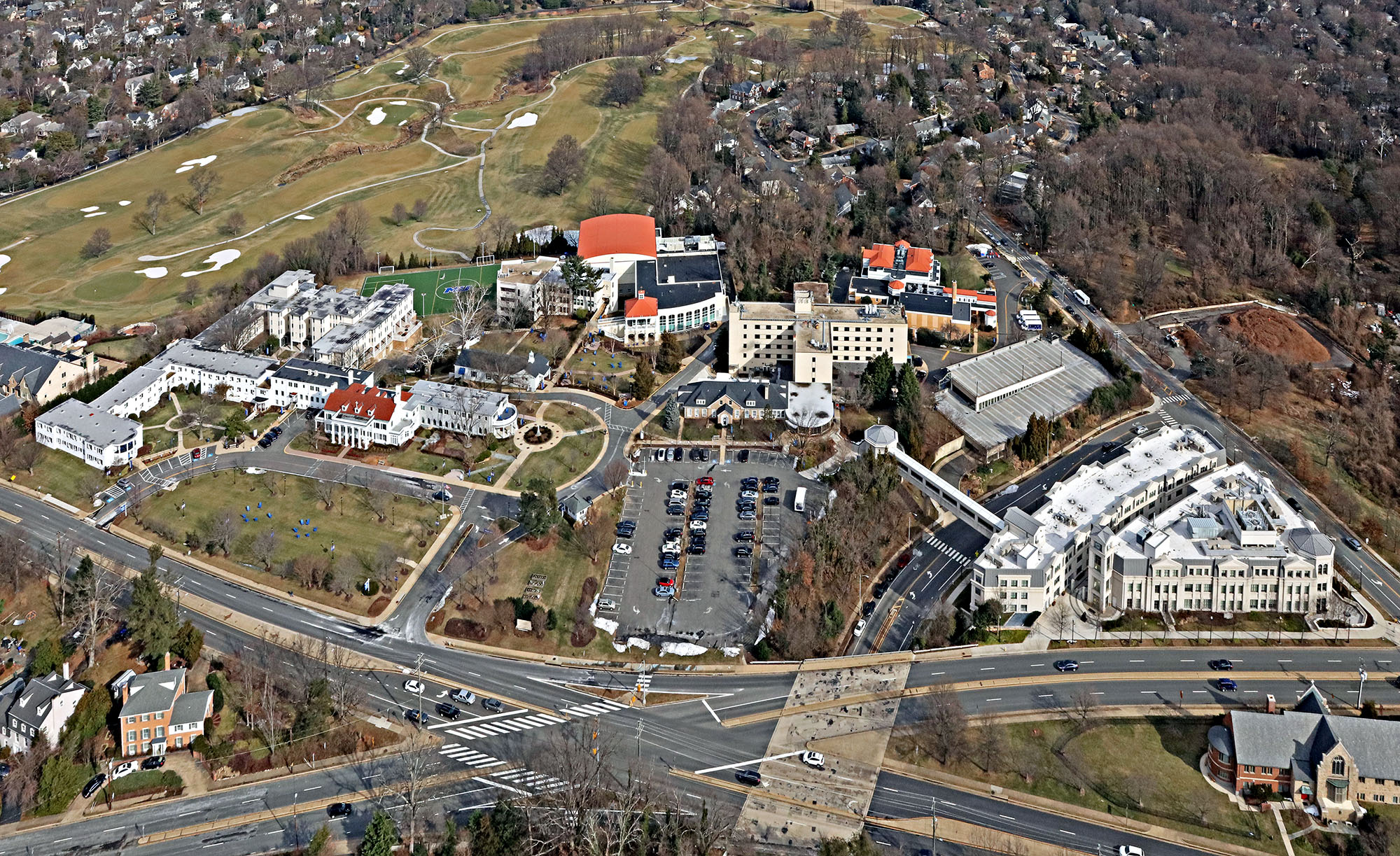
Marymount University

Marymount’s 4040 Center houses its physical therapy doctoral program and a MedStar clinic, a partnership with MedStar NRH Rehabilitation Network that provides community physical therapy services and clinical training for students. The center is located near the main campus, within walking distance of the Ballston–MU Metro Station, and is accessible by free Marymount shuttles.

== Athletics and recreation ==
Marymount Saints logo

Marymount's athletic teams, known as the Saints, compete in NCAA Division III in the Atlantic East Conference and sponsor twenty-three sports. Men's sports include baseball, basketball, cross country, golf, lacrosse, soccer, swimming, tennis, track & field, volleyball and wrestling. Women's sports include basketball, cross country, flag football, golf, lacrosse, soccer, softball, swimming, tennis, track and field, volleyball and wrestling.

After nearly twenty-nine years as a founding member of the Capital Athletic Conference (now the Coast to Coast Athletic Conference), Marymount joined with six other institutions in the region to form a new league, the Atlantic East Conference, which received NCAA approval to begin competition on September 1, 2018.

In 2020, a record fifty percent of Marymount student-athletes were named to the Atlantic East Conference All-Academic Team. Additionally, six student-athletes earned a spot on the Virginia Sports Information Directors (VaSID) Academic All-State team.

== Clubs and student organizations ==
Marymount University has over thirty clubs and student organizations, which are created based on the interests of Marymount students, and include groups dedicated to community service or philanthropy, cultural appreciation or specific academic interests.

The Student Government Association, Association for Campus Events and Marymount University's student-run newspaper The Banner provide students with additional organizational management experience. In addition, students have the opportunity to engage in leadership development opportunities through participation as an Orientation Leader or Resident Assistant.

== Awards and acknowledgments ==
In the U.S. News & World Report's 2023 Best Colleges Rankings, Marymount University was listed among "Best National Universities" for the first time in the institution's history. Previously, it was listed with "Regional Universities of the South."

Additional recognitions include:

- Designated a Hispanic-Serving Institution (HSI) and certified by the U.S. Department of Education.
- Named 2017 Educator of the Year by the World Affairs Council, Washington, D.C.
- Classified in 2025 as both a Research University and an Opportunity University
- #273 in the 2026 Best College Rankings (US News)

== Notable alumni ==
- Cindy Eckert, co-founder and CEO of Sprout Pharmaceuticals
- Marguerite M. Engler, nurse scientist and physiologist
- Tonye Garrick, Nigerian singer and songwriter
- Ryan Hampton (attended, but did not graduate), writer and political activist surrounding addiction
- Gregg McCrary, author and former FBI criminal profiler
- Rashad Robinson, President of Color of Change
- Michael D. Smith, CEO of AmeriCorps
- Doreen Wonda Johnson, member of the New Mexico House of Representatives
- Mia Yim, professional wrestler
