= Cindy Eckert =

American entrepreneur

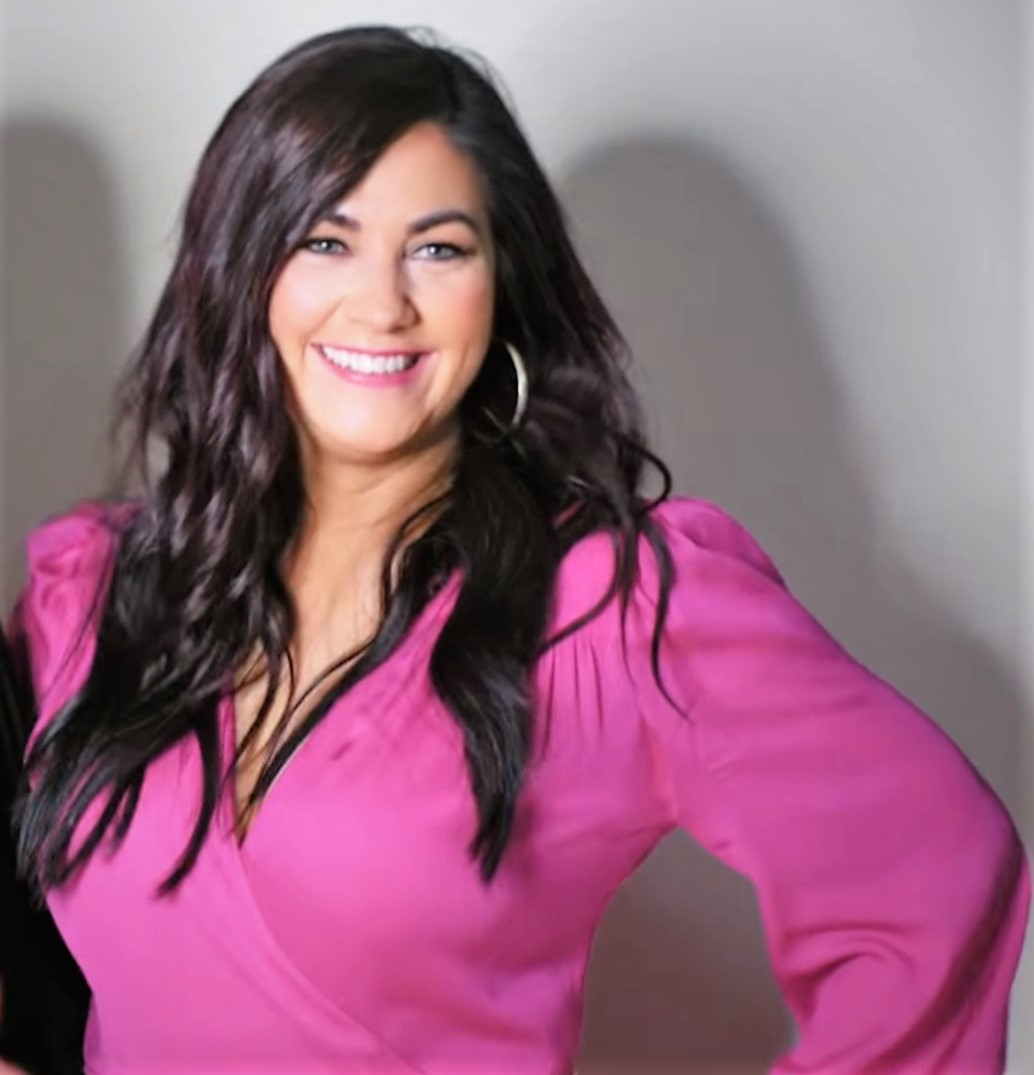
- Born: 1973 (age 52–53); Rochester, New York, U.S.
- Other name: Cindy Whitehead
- Education: Marymount University (BBA)
- Father: Fred J. Eckert

Cindy Eckert (born 1973)is an American entrepreneur known for founding Sprout Pharmaceuticals. She subsequently founded The Pink Ceiling which invests in companies founded by, or delivering products for, women. In November 2017, Eckert re-acquired Sprout Pharmaceuticals as part of a lawsuit settlement, and the rights to its drug Addyi, from Valeant after Valeant's stock collapsed due to insider trading and price jacking allegations.

== Early life and education ==
Cindy Eckert was born in Western New York. According to a New York Times profile piece, she attended a different school each year from the fourth grade through the twelfth. During those years she lived overseas where her father, Fred J. Eckert, served as a U.S. Ambassador to Fiji. She earned a Bachelor of Business Administration from Marymount University.

== Career ==
Eckert began her career with Merck, before moving on to work with smaller, specialty pharmaceutical companies Dura and Elan. After a stint with QVC, Eckert was a founder of Slate Pharmaceuticals and Sprout Pharmaceuticals.

Eckert co-founded Slate Pharmaceuticals in 2007. Slate was focused on men's sexual health with an FDA approved long acting testosterone product, Testopel. Slate sold in 2011 to Actient Pharmaceuticals.

In August 2015, she sold Sprout Pharmaceuticals for $1 billion, to Valeant, a day after the company won FDA approval for the drug Addyi, the first drug designed to enhance female libido.

As Cindy Whitehead, she co-founded Sprout with her husband, Bob Whitehead. They acquired from Boehringer Ingelheim the rights to flibanserin, the active drug in Addyi, while running the Durham, North Carolina company, Sprout Pharmaceuticals.

Both Slate Pharmaceuticals and Sprout Pharmaceuticals had been privately held.

In November 2017, it was announced that Valeant would sell Sprout Pharmaceuticals back to its original owners, two years after acquiring the business for $1 billion.

Eckert established an investment firm called The Pink Ceiling in 2016 after the most recent exit, when she sold Sprout Pharmaceuticals to Valeant Pharmaceuticals for $1 billion. In November 2017, Eckert re-acquired Sprout Pharmaceuticals from Valeant for "almost nothing" as part of a settlement of a lawsuit, according to Bloomberg News. Valeant's stock had collapsed nearly 80% from the acquisition price due to a large financial engineering and price jacking scandal.

In 2018, Cindy Whitehead formally changed her name to Cindy Eckert.

In 2021, she received an honorary Doctor of Humane Letters from North Carolina State University.

=== The Pink Ceiling ===
Eckert launched the Pink Ceiling in order to improve access to capital for female-led start-ups. “The injustice I’m fighting with the Pink Ceiling is not only women’s limited access to capital, but also their limited access to mentors,” she told Entrepreneur Magazine. Eckert works with a team of women to determine which female-led companies will be the recipients of venture capital funding.

To date, The Pink Ceiling has invested in eleven start-ups, with public announcements on their involvement with Undercover Colors (a company that is developing wearable nail tech to detect the presence of a date rape drug in drinks), Lia Diagnostics (which produces a flushable pregnancy test), Intuitap (which has a medical device aimed to streamline the spinal tap procedure), and Pursuit (which is developing a patented technology to improve four different aspects of sleep)

The Pink Ceiling's affiliated incubator, called the “Pinkubator” because of its female focus, is located in Raleigh, North Carolina. The “Pinkubator” was established to provide female-focused entrepreneurs with direct access to mentors, investment opportunities, and business development guidance.

=== The Pink Pill Documentary ===
In 2025, Eckert was featured as the central subject of "The Pink Pill: Sex, Drugs & Who Has Control," a documentary directed by Aisling Chin-Yee. The film chronicles her campaign to secure FDA approval for Addyi and examines gender disparities in pharmaceutical development and women's healthcare. The film premiered at DOC NYC in November 2025, where it won the festival's Audience Award. Eckert participated in Q&A sessions following the premiere screenings. Paramount+ secured distribution rights for Canada with a planned early 2026 release.

== Controversy ==
Eckert's drug Addyi has faced rampant criticism from scientists and physicians due to lack of efficacy and a PR campaign waged by her company Sprout Pharmaceuticals against the FDA. Critics have said that it shows the FDA caving to social pressure over the actual benefits of the drug. In 2020 the FDA sent Sprout a warning letter regarding their marketing of the drug demanding the Sprout create "comprehensive plan for truthful, non-misleading, and complete corrective messages".
