= 1015 Folsom =

Dance club in San Francisco, California, US

- Address: 1015 Folsom Street; San Francisco, California; United States
- Owner: Ira Sandler
- Capacity: ~1,350–1,500
- Type: Nightclub

Construction
- Opened: 1986 (as Das Klub); 1989 (as 1015 Folsom)

Website
- 1015.com

1015 Folsom is a dance club and live music venue in San Francisco, California. Founded as Das Klub in 1986, 1015 Folsom has hosted performances by many prominent entertainers, bands, musicians, and DJs, including Madonna, Tiësto, Giorgio Moroder, Fatboy Slim, Pabllo Vittar and Dave Chapelle. It is one of the longest-running, continuously-operating dance clubs in the US.

== Early History ==
The building at 1015 Folsom Street was originally a gay bathhouse before the San Francisco AIDS crisis led to a city order that shut it down in 1984. It was first opened as a dance club called Major Ponds in 1985. Ira Sandler opened the building as Das Klub in 1986. The building reopened as 1015 Folsom a few days before the Loma Prieta earthquake.

According to eyewitnesses, Gianni Versace allegedly met his future killer at a party at 1015 Folsom. The Versace family disputes this.

== Venue ==
The venue is roughly 20,000 square feet with five rooms. The building has a maximum capacity of roughly 1,500 people, with a capacity of 800 people in the main room.

In 2002, 1015 Folsom won “Best Club/Club Night” at the inaugural DanceStar USA Awards. The club has seen over 3 million attendees since opening its doors.

In 2007, general manager Peter Glikshtern pivoted the venue to showing more live rock music. Its first live act under this new direction was The Donnas. A planned name change was not carried out.

== Documentary ==
1015 Folsom was heavily featured in the documentary Between the Beats about 1990s rave culture in San Francisco.

== Citations ==
=== References ===
- Kane, Peter-Astrid (October 9, 2019). "1015 Folsom Keeps On Ticking By Embracing Its Audience". SF Weekly.
- Rotter, Joshua (October 21, 2019). "1015 Folsom looks forward on 30th anniversary". San Francisco Examiner.
- Moskowitz, Gary (January 2016). "City Does Music Venues a Solid With New Noise Protection Law". SF Weekly.
- "Fatboy Slim Nabs Two DanceStar USA Awards". Billboard. March 2002.
- "Justice, Black Coffee, Bicep, Whethan & More to Play 30th Anniversary of San Francisco's 1015 Folsom". Billboard. September 2019.
- Parsons, Paige K. (February 23, 2018). "Dave Chappelle and Mos Def Crash Madlib Concert in San Francisco". Billboard.
- "Legendary San Francisco Nightclub 1015 Folsom Levels Up with d&b audiotechnik A-Series Sound System". Mix. May 28, 2025.
- Orth, Maureen (1999). Vulgar Favors: Andrew Cunanan, Gianni Versace, and the Largest Failed Manhunt in U.S. History. Delacorte Press. ISBN 9780385332866.
- "Did Gianni Versace Know Andrew Cunanan? American Crime Story Tries to Fill in the Gaps". Bustle. February 2018.
- "New Documentary Explores the '90s Rave History of San Francisco: Watch the Trailer". Billboard. 2024.
- "1015 Folsom Edges Toward the Live Rock Market". SF Weekly. January 23, 2008.

==== See also ====
- South of Market, San Francisco
- Trocadero Transfer
- Andrew Cunanan
- Noise Pop Festival
