= Jeffrey Trail =

American naval officer (1969–1997)

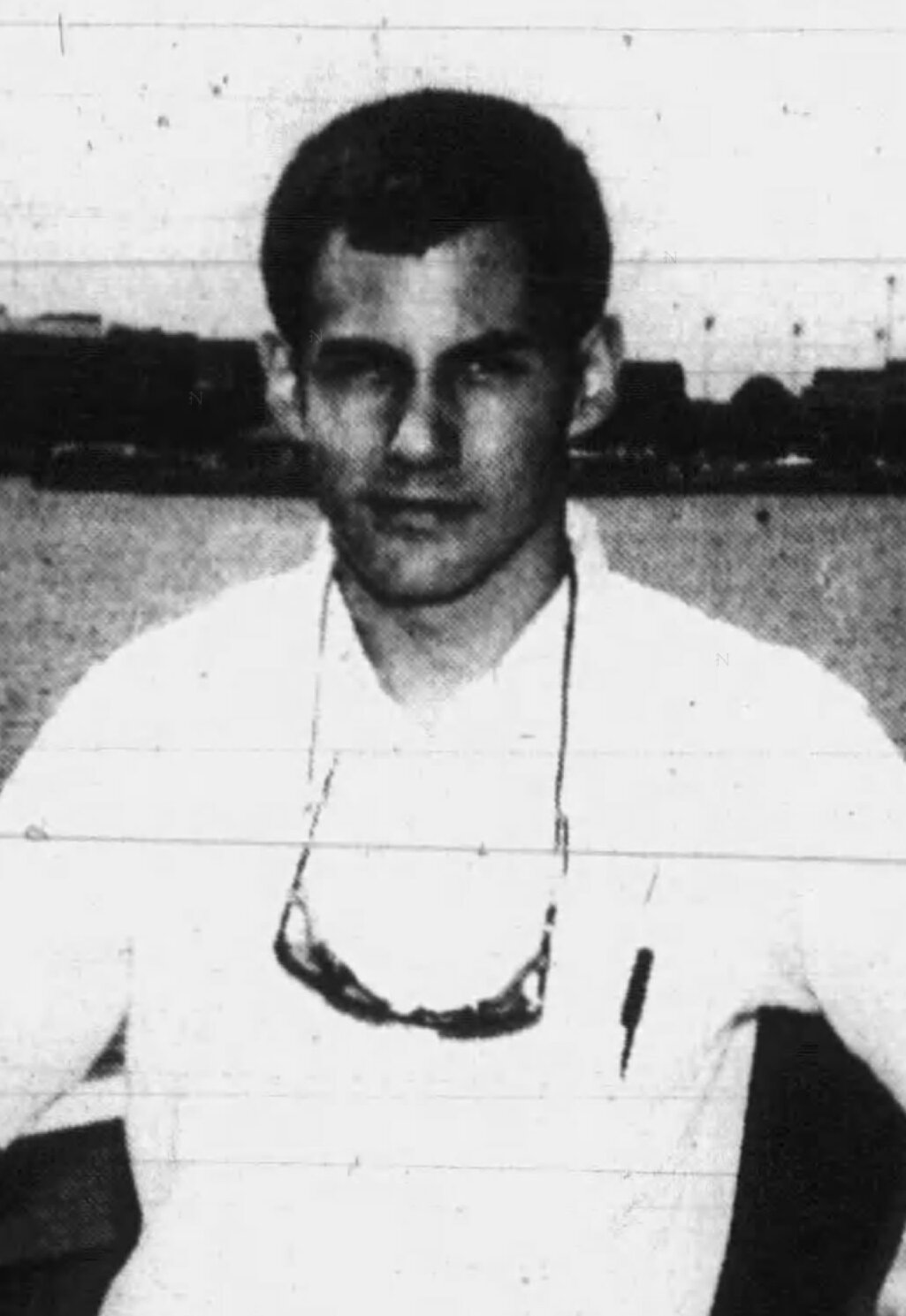
- Trail c. 1986
- Born: Jeffrey Allen Trail; February 25, 1969; DeKalb, Illinois, U.S.
- Died: April 27, 1997 (aged 28); Minneapolis, Minnesota, U.S.
- Cause of death: Blunt trauma
- Education: United States Naval Academy
- Partner: Jon Hackett (last)
- Military career
- Allegiance: United States
- Branch: U.S. Navy
- Service years: 1987–1996
- Rank: Lieutenant (junior grade)
- Conflicts: Gulf War

Jeffrey Allen Trail (February 25, 1969 – April 27, 1997) was an American naval lieutenant and Gulf War veteran who was the first victim of spree killer Andrew Cunanan.

Four years before his killing, Trail was interviewed on condition of anonymity by CBS News journalist Richard Schlesinger for the series 48 Hours as part of the debate over the don't ask, don't tell policy.

== Early life and military career ==
Jeffrey Trail was born in DeKalb, Illinois, in February 1969, the son of Stanley M. Trail, a U.S. Army veteran and mathematics professor at Northern Illinois University (NIU), and Ann Catlin Davis, a school of education teacher at NIU and a classroom teacher at DeKalb High School and Belvidere High School. Jeffrey was of Scottish descent by his father's side.

Trail graduated from DeKalb High School in 1987 and was a member of the National Honor Society. He was educated at NIU and also took courses at Southern Illinois University Carbondale. That same year, Trail enrolled at the United States Naval Academy in Annapolis, Maryland, where he was officially appointed by Senator Paul Simon (D-IL). He graduated in June 1991 and he served on a guided missile cruiser in the Persian Gulf after the Gulf War, attaining the Surface Warfare Officer designation while on service. Trail was subsequently appointed to the Naval Amphibious Base Coronado in Coronado, California, joining the Assault Craft Unit 1 and earning the badge of lieutenant (junior grade) in May 1993.

In 1996, Trail left the Navy as a lieutenant junior grade and moved to California, applying for a training program with the California Highway Patrol. Shortly after joining the highway police, Trail abruptly resigned and moved to Minneapolis as a district manager for Ferrellgas.

=== Don't ask, don't tell interview ===
- "48 Hours"' Richard Schlesinger's connection with a Cunanan victim – Reference

In 1993, CBS News journalist Richard Schlesinger interviewed Trail, who spoke on condition of anonymity on 48 Hours about being gay in the U.S. military. He said that the debate over the don't ask, don't tell policy, which was later approved by President Clinton, would weaken national defense and that it would not be possible to remove all gay people from the military, stating that the government persecuted and forced them to fear. Schlesinger recalled in December 2017 that Trail impressed him and described him as "smart, good-looking, and very brave." Schlesinger added that he and his team were "stunned and saddened" when they learned of Trail's murder and the gruesome details around it.

At around the same time, Trail met Andrew Cunanan while serving on board the USS Gridley while it was docked in San Diego.

== Relationship with Cunanan ==
According to author Maureen Orth, around the time that he met Cunanan, Trail was struggling with his sexuality, knowing that he was gay but not being able to say it in the military. Orth added that Trail was awed by Cunanan's way of living his homosexuality, including his flamboyance and the ease with which Cunanan handled the issue. However, Trail grew frustrated over Cunanan's pathological lying and fake personas, which included using Trail as an accessory to the fantastical lies he told to his circle of friends. On one of those occasions, on Cunanan's 26th birthday, Trail was told to pose as a doctor for the invitees as well as wear a pair of Ferragamo shoes and tell others that Cunanan had given the shoes to him as a gift.

Before moving to Minneapolis in November 1996, some friends of Trail told him about their dislike for Cunanan. One couple of lesbian friends, Chris Gamache and Judy Fleissner, urged Trail to cut Cunanan out of his life, calling Cunanan a "jerk" and an "idiot". However, according to Trail's sister Candace Parrott, her brother defended Cunanan and referred to him as the "black sheep" of a family who "you just put up with and just love him". Other friends of Trail testified after the murder spree that Cunanan tried to emulate Trail, mimicking his haircuts and styles.

Right before he left California and moved to Minneapolis, a close friend of Trail, Michael Williams, wished him good luck and asked him to "please be safe", to which Trail responded by pulling out a handgun and reassuring Williams that he would be fine; that pistol was the one Cunanan later used in his killing spree. In Minneapolis, Trail befriended architect David Madson, a former boyfriend of Cunanan whom he had met in San Francisco. According to their common acquaintances and friends, Trail warned Madson about Cunanan's lying and told him not to believe anything he said. One of Trail's friends, Rick Allen, said that Cunanan had tried to recruit Trail for his own drug business, which profoundly disgusted Trail, a politically conservative man and a strong opponent of drugs.

=== Murder ===
By April 1997, Cunanan told a friend that he was uncomfortable over having the two most important persons of his life living in the same faraway city. Some reporters theorised after the killings that the relationship between Trail and Madson could have fuelled Cunanan's paranoia, despite Trail dating a man named Jon Hackett and only casually meeting with Madson, with Orth saying in her book that the pair had become friends over their common relationship with Cunanan while they lived in California.

On April 25, 1997, Cunanan took a flight from San Diego to Minneapolis, surprising Trail and Madson with his visit. He stole Trail's handgun and took it to Madson's apartment, phoning Trail and asking him to come fetch his gun. When Trail arrived, Cunanan attacked him with a hammer and killed him in front of Madson, placing his body behind a sofa and rolled in a rug. Trail's killing marked the beginning of Cunanan's murder spree. Cunanan later committed four other murders: Madson, Chicago businessman Lee Miglin, a New Jersey cemetery keeper, William Reese, and Italian fashion designer Gianni Versace. Cunanan subsequently committed suicide on a houseboat in Miami Beach, Florida, on July 23, 1997, as a SWAT team attempted to arrest him.

== Aftermath and in media ==
In September 2019, the DeKalb County, Illinois, veteran fund announced the creation of a scholarship in honour of Trail's military career. Trail's family donated to the fund in May 2024. The foundation, whose name is Jeffrey A. Trail Memorial Fund, offers scholarships for DeKalb High School graduates for a two- or four-year term of studies in aviation technology, including professional flight and pilot training.

Trail's parents, who had met at Oklahoma State University, married in December 1966 in Bartlesville, Oklahoma, before moving to DeKalb. Ann Davis Trail died in September 2016 in DeKalb at the age of 88. Stanley Trail died nine years later, in September 2025, at a retirement home in DeKalb at the age of 95.

Trail was portrayed by actor David Wolfson in the 1998 film The Versace Murder and by actor Finn Wittrock in The Assassination of Gianni Versace: American Crime Story, the second season of American Crime Story.
