= Gregg McCrary =

American FBI agent & writer (born 1945)

Gregg O. McCrary (born September 10, 1945) is a former FBI agent who served from 1969 to 1995, an expert witness and consultant, an author and an adjunct forensic psychology professor at Nova Southeastern University in Fort Lauderdale, and at Marymount University in Arlington, Virginia. McCrary was a contributing author to the 1992 Crime Classification Manual.

== Career ==
In 2003, he published The Unknown Darkness, a book detailing those cases which he found most important. During his tenure with the FBI, McCrary was a criminal profiler and threat analyst in Quantico, Virginia. He was a member of the "Criminal Investigative Analysis" subunit of the National Center for the Analysis of Violent Crime (NCAVC), serving the center from its foundation in 1985. Since retiring from the FBI, McCrary has served as an expert witness.

British author Colin Wilson dedicated his 1990 book The Serial Killers to Agent McCrary.
