= Miglin-Beitler Skyneedle =

Proposed building in Chicago, Illinois

Coordinates: 41°52′53.7″N 87°38′3.8″W

- Interactive map of the Miglin-Beitler Skyneedle area

General information
- Status: Unbuilt proposal
- Location: Chicago, Illinois, 201 West Madison Street

Height
- Height: 1,999 feet (609 m)

Technical details
- Floor count: 125
- Floor area: 1.9 million square feet (180,000 m^{2})

Design and construction
- Architect: Cesar Pelli
- Developer: Miglin-Beitler Developments

The Miglin-Beitler Skyneedle was a proposed 125-floor skyscraper intended for Chicago, Illinois, United States, by Lee Miglin and J. Paul Beitler's firm Miglin-Beitler Developments and designed by architect César Pelli. The site of the proposed Skyneedle now is host to a parking garage. If it had been built when it was planned, the 1,999-foot-tall (609 m) Miglin-Beitler Skyneedle would have been the tallest building in the world at the time of its completion.

The tower's plans were unveiled in 1988. The plans would falter due to the post-Gulf War market downturn. Miglin-Beitler held hopes of reviving the project, but these were dashed by the murder of Lee Miglin, by serial killer Andrew Cunanan.

The tower would have risen 125 floors and 1,999 ft (609 m). This would have made it the tallest building in the world, being taller than the Sears Tower (also in Chicago). It would have also been the tallest freestanding structure in the world, being 135 feet (41 m) taller than the CN Tower in Toronto. It would have had approximately 1,900,000 sq ft (180,000 m^{2}) of space (with 1.2 million being office space). As of October 1989 it was proposed to cost $400 million (equivalent to $878 million in 2024). As of July 1990, it was planned to cost $450 million (equivalent to $952 million in 2024) to construct. As of both of these dates, it was tentatively planned to open in 1993. The building had very narrow floorplates, averaging around 15,000 sq ft (1,400 m^{2}) per floor. This would have meant that it would have cumulatively had less floor space than many 50-floor towers. The building would have had a silver-colored exterior, with a glassy exterior for most of its height and granite cladding at street-level.

The firm had believed that the observation deck planned atop the tower, as well as the twelve floors of parking at its lower levels, would produce large amounts of revenue. The ultimately-planned twelve floors of parking was an increase from the ten proposed earlier into plans for the building. Plans also called for the building to include a two-level health club, which would include an olympic-size swimming pool. The lower levels were also proposed to feature retail complex. The building would have contained a sky lobby. Office space in the building would have been marketed to smaller yet prestigious firms. The goal was to attract law firms and other tenants desiring a high-status location, but needing only between 8,000 and 10,000 sq ft (740 and 930 m^{2}) of office space. It was also proposed that the top of the building would include the highest observation restaurant in any structure.

As of late-1989, it was planned to charge high rent for office space in the building, at $35 per square foot. This was pricing more akin to the steeper Manhattan office market at the time, which led other developers to express doubts that a building in the Chicago market could attract occupants with such rental rates. A 1989 opinion poll conducted for the Chicago Sun-Times showed Chicagoans overall to have had strong enthusiasm about the proposed tower.

There were a number of challenges faced by the project before the post-Gulf War economic downturned ultimately doomed it. This included the earlier savings and loan crisis putting in place a stricter regulatory climate for banks and credit unions, which made many financial institutions wary of large real estate projects as investments. Another challenge was that the Chicago real estate market, particularly in its downtown, was "soft". The downtown had an office space vacancy rate of 14%, which was on the rise. Additionally, millions of additional square feet of office space was already under construction in downtown Chicago, with millions more to open up with Sears moving out of the Sears Tower for a new suburban headquarters. Another challenge that analysts predicted was that larger corporate tenants might avoid the building, as its narrow floorplates would require firms needing larger amounts of office space to locate their offices across several floors. This potential aversion to the building by larger firms could prevent the building from attracting large "anchor" tenants.

Miglin–Beitler had experience with developing office buildings in the area of the city that the tower was to stand. Across Wells Street from the site where the tower was to be built is another Pelli project previously developed by Miglin-Beitler, 181 West Madison Street, which reportedly inspired the general design of the Skyneedle. Visually the shape of the Skyneedle would have resembled a stretched-out version of 181 W Madison. Across Madison Street from the site where the tower was to be built is 200 West Madison, another building developed previously by Miglin-Beitler.

César Pelli also designed the Petronas Towers in Kuala Lumpur, which utilizes a similar innovative concrete structure as the one originally proposed for the Miglin Beitler Skyneedle.
