= Irma Becerra Fernandez =

Cuban-American higher education leader

Irma Becerra-Fernandez
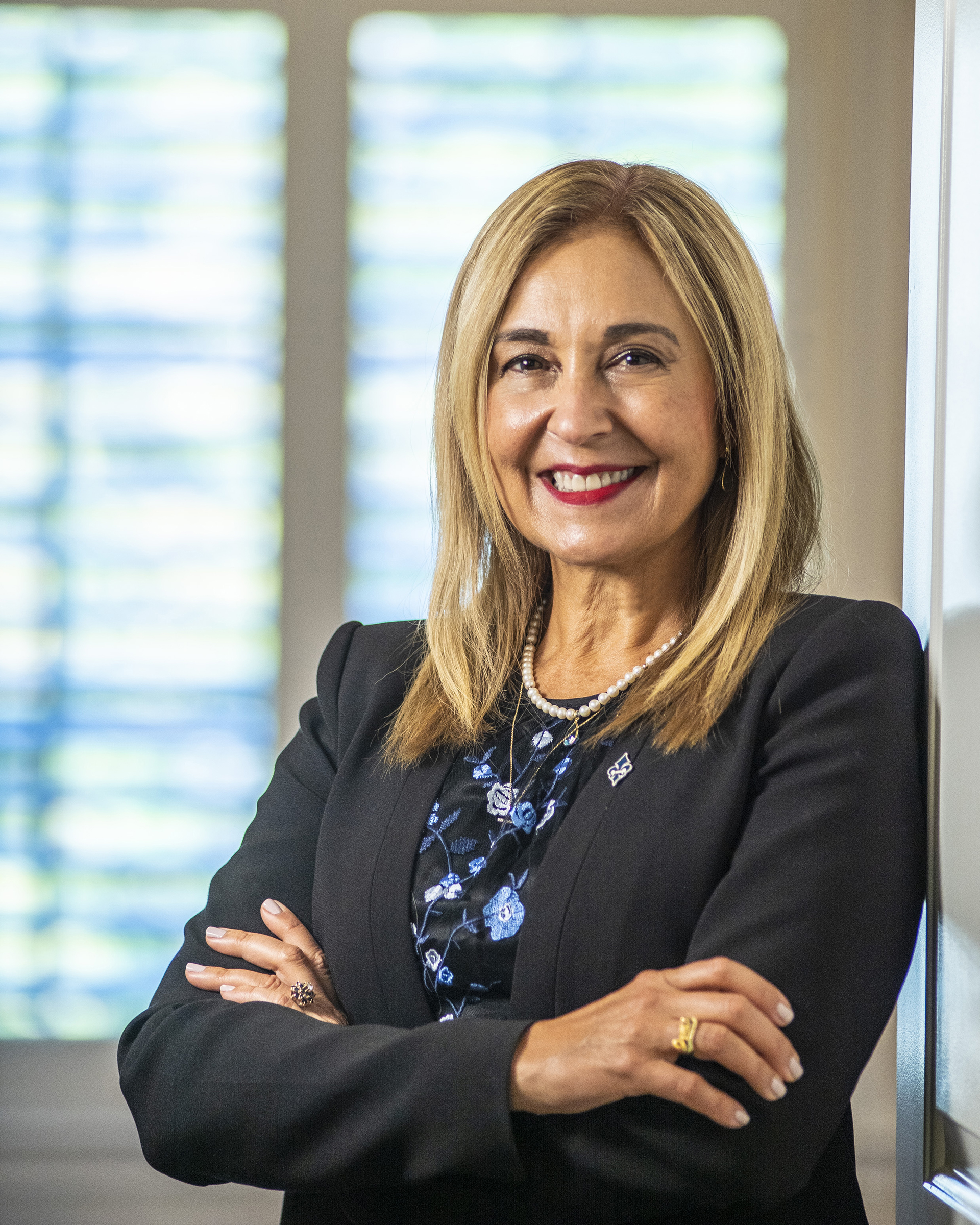
- Becerra-Fernandez in October 2020
- Education: University of Miami, B.S.; University of Miami, M.Sci.; Florida International University, Ph.D.
- Occupation: President
- Employer: Marymount University
- Known for: Higher Education Leadership

Irma Becerra-Fernandez is an American electrical engineer and the seventh president of Marymount University. She has held this role since July 1, 2018. Prior to her current post, she was the provost and chief academic officer at St. Thomas University (Florida).

== Early life and education ==
Becerra-Fernandez was born in Cuba and moved to the United States as an infant, growing up in Puerto Rico. She earned a Bachelor of Science and a Master of Science in Electrical Engineering from the University of Miami. She later received a Ph.D. in Electrical Engineering from Florida International University (FIU), becoming the first woman to earn a doctoral degree in that field from the institution.

== Career ==
Becerra founded FIU's Knowledge Management Lab and led projects as principal investigator at the National Science Foundation, NASA (Headquarters, Kennedy, Ames, and Goddard Space Flight Centers), and the Air Force Research Lab. She was also a Sloan Scholar at MIT's Center for Information Systems Research.

Fernandez served as Provost and Chief Academic Officer at St. Thomas University in Miami Gardens, Fla., from 2014 to 2018.

She is the first Latina president of Marymount University, and her contract was extended through June 2028. Becerra is a contributor to the Forbes Business Council and serves as the Vice Chair of the Consortium of Universities of the Washington Metropolitan Area's board of trustees.

Her leadership at Marymount has been guided by the institution's newly adopted vision: "Marymount, a leading Catholic university, will be nationally recognized for innovation and commitment to student success, alumni achievement, and faculty and staff excellence." During her tenure, Marymount achieved several milestones, including:

- Becoming nationally ranked for the first time by U.S. News & World Report
- Receiving designation as Virginia's first Hispanic-Serving Institution
- Earning classification as a Research University by the Carnegie Foundation and the American Council on Education

During the COVID-19 pandemic, Becerra led the university through a transition to remote and hybrid learning, prioritizing faculty training, digital accessibility, and health protocols.

== Research and knowledge management ==
Becerra's academic work explores knowledge sharing, organizational learning, and information systems. She has published numerous peer-reviewed articles and several books. Her research often focuses on knowledge transfer and organizational resilience, particularly during crisis situations.

== Advocacy and educational philosophy ==
Becerra advocates for increased representation of women and minorities in STEM fields. As a first-generation college graduate and immigrant, she has mentored underrepresented students and emphasized a values-based educational approach. At Marymount, a Catholic institution, she has highlighted the integration of faith, reason, and service within the academic experience.

== Awards and recognition ==
- Named one of the 50 Most Influential People by Northern Virginia Magazine (2024)
- Named one of the Most Powerful Women in Washington by Washingtonian (2023)
- 2022 St. Elizabeth Ann Seton Award from the Support Our Aging Religious (SOAR!) organization
- Washington Business Journal's Diversity, Equity, and Inclusion Champion of 2022
- Women in Leadership Award from Virginia Business (2022)
- Saluted as one of the Top 35 Women in Higher Education by Diverse: Issues in Higher Education, 2020
- Recognized in the Washington Business Journal's Power 100 Class of 2019
- Selected as one of the Washington Business Journal's "Women Who Mean Business," 2019
- Educator of the Year by the South Florida Hispanic Chamber of Commerce, 2015
- Bronze Medal Award by the Miami Today Newspaper, 2014
- 2013 Educator of the Year by HENAAC Great Minds in STEM
- In the Company of Women Award for Education and Research, a Women's History Month Celebration, with support from The Parks Foundation of Miami-Dade, the Office of the Mayor, and the Board of County Commissioners, March 2012
- The Association of Cuban Engineers' Engineer of the Year Award for outstanding contributions to the profession, 2011
- Kauffman Entrepreneurship Professor, Florida International University Pino Center for Entrepreneurship, March 2007
- Selected for initiation into the professional business fraternity, Delta Sigma Pi, for academic achievements and continued interest in the profession, April 2006
- Florida International University Torch Award for Outstanding Faculty (presented by the FIU Alumni Association), 2004
- Washington Business Journal's Power 100 of 2025
- Washingtonian's Most Powerful Women in Washington 2025
- Northern Virginia Magazine's 50 Most Influential of 2025

== Books ==
- Becerra-Fernandez, Irma; Sabherwal, Rajiv; Kumi, Richard (2024). Knowledge management: systems and processes in the AI era (Third ed.). London New York: Routledge. ISBN 9781032428024.
- Rajiv., Sabherwal (2011). Business intelligence : practices, technologies, and management. Becerra-Fernandez, Irma. Hoboken, NJ: Wiley. ISBN 9780470461709. OCLC 465681797.
- Becerra-Fernandez, Irma (2008). Knowledge management : an evolutionary view. Leidner, D. E. (Dorothy E.). Armonk, N.Y.: M.E. Sharpe, Inc. ISBN 9780765623744. OCLC 471133953.
- Becerra-Fernandez, Irma (2004). Knowledge management : challenges, solutions, and technologies. González, Avelino J., Sabherwal, Rajiv. Upper Saddle River, N.J.: Pearson/Prentice Hall. ISBN 978-0131016064. OCLC 52877851.
