= Maurice Edington =

President of the University of the District of Columbia
- Incumbent
- Assumed office August 2023
- Preceded by: Ronald Mason Jr.

Personal details
- Education: Fisk University (BA); Vanderbilt University (MA, PhD)

Maurice Edington is the tenth president of the University of the District of Columbia. He began his tenure in August 2023, succeeding Ronald Mason Jr.

== Prior positions ==
Edington had a 25-year career at FAMU and served as executive VP and chief operating officer at Florida A&M University (FAMU) from 2022 to 2023 and prior to that as provost and VP for academic affairs at that school. His prior positions included vice president for strategic planning, analysis, and institutional effectiveness at FAMU and serving as the founding dean for the FAMU College of Science and Technology. He started at FAMU as an assistant professor.

== Education ==
Edington received a Bachelor of Arts in chemistry from Fisk University, a Ph.D. in physical chemistry from Vanderbilt University, and he completed postdoctoral studies at Duke University.

== Personal life ==
Edington was raised by his grandparents. He is married and has one daughter.
