= DIFFA =

American AIDS charity

- Established: 1984
- Founders: Pat Green; Larry Pond
- Type: Nonprofit
- Legal status: Active
- Purpose: AIDS charity
- Region served: Worldwide
- Website: Official website

DIFFA, also known as Design Industries Foundation Fighting AIDS, is an American AIDS charity.

DIFFA marked a 30-year milestone of charity work in 2014.
