= Anne Hendershott =

American author and professor

- Born: Anne Barnhardt; July 12, 1949 (age 77); Waterbury, Connecticut, U.S.
- Education: Central Connecticut State University; Kent State University
- Occupations: Author, professor, academic
- Writing career
- Genre: Sociology
- Subjects: Politics, Deviance, Abortion
- Notable works: The Politics of Abortion, The Politics of Deviance, Status Envy: The Politics of Catholic Higher Education

Anne Hendershott (née Barnhardt; born July 12, 1949, Waterbury, Connecticut) is an American sociologist and author known for her conservative Christian writings on Catholic issues in US politics.

She is the author of several books, including The Politics of Deviance, The Politics of Abortion, and Status Envy: The Politics of Catholic Higher Education. She has taught at the University of San Diego and at The King's College in New York City. She is currently a professor of psychology, Sociology, and Social Work at Franciscan University (Steubenville, Ohio).

== Career ==
One of three daughters of George Barnhardt, a college professor, Anne Barnhardt received her B.A. and M.S. degrees from Central Connecticut State University and her Ph.D. in sociology from Kent State University. A Roman Catholic who has written extensively on abortion and the anti-abortion movement, she lives in Milford, Connecticut, with her husband, Dana Hendershott. The couple has two children.

As a sociology professor at the University of San Diego, a Catholic university, she contributed opinion articles to the San Diego Union-Tribune.

She taught there for 15 years before transferring to The King's College in New York City in 2008. Her articles have appeared in National Review magazine.

She currently teaches at Franciscan University of Steubenville in Ohio since 2011.

== Books ==
- Moving for Work: The Sociology of Relocating in the 1990s (1995)
- The Reluctant Caregivers: Learning to Care for a Loved One with Alzheimer's (2000)
- The Politics of Deviance (2004)
- The Politics of Abortion (2006)
- Status Envy: The Politics of Catholic Higher Education (2009)
- Renewal: How a Generation of Faithful Priests and Bishops is Revitalizing the Catholic Church
