= 181 West Madison Street =

Office skyscraper in Chicago, Illinois

Coordinates: 41.8816°N 87.6334°W

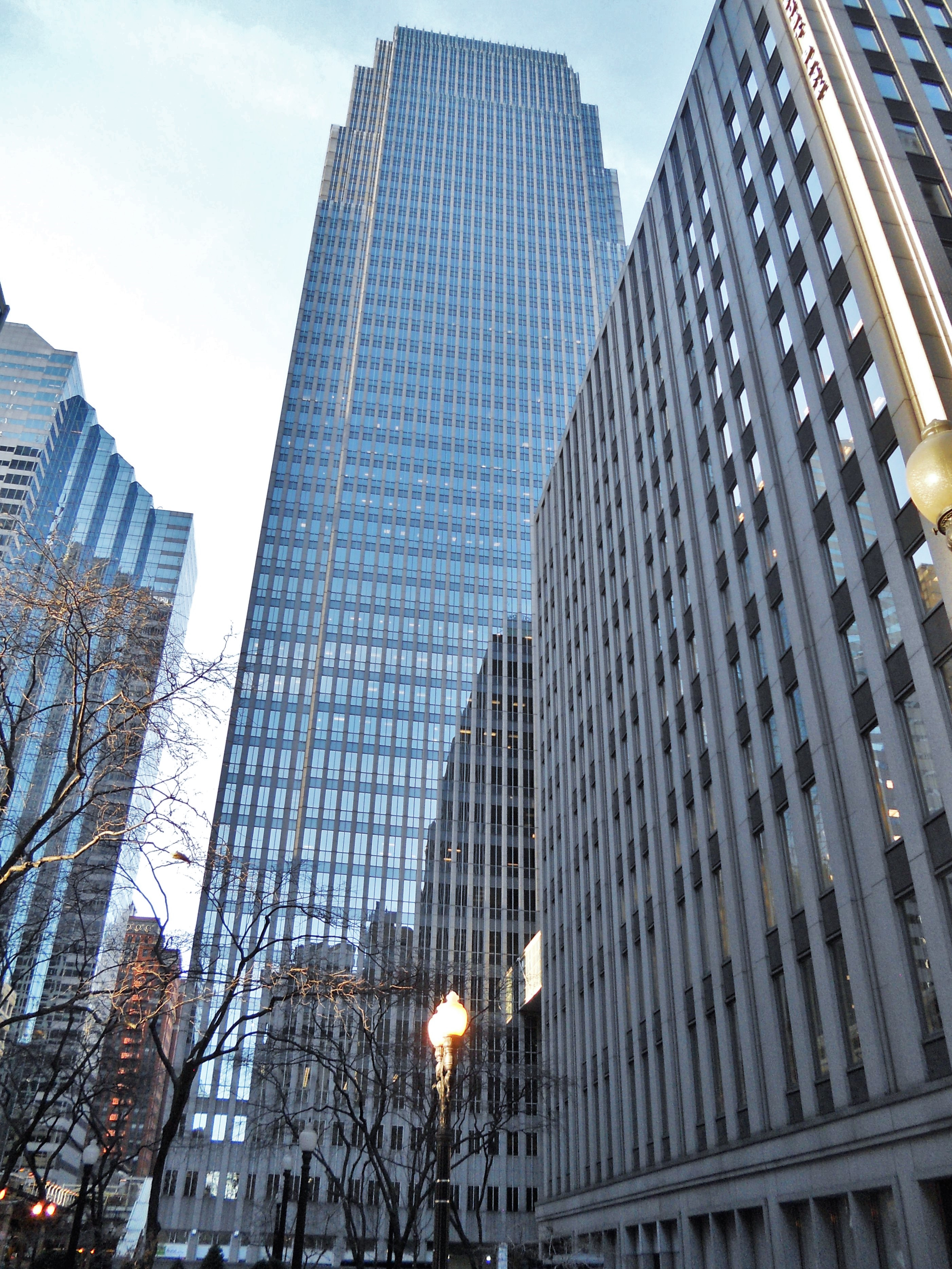
- View looking up
- Interactive map of the 181 West Madison Street area
- Alternative names: Paine Webber Tower

General information
- Status: Completed
- Type: Office
- Location: Chicago, Illinois, 181 West Madison Street
- Construction started: 1988
- Opened: 1990

Height
- Architectural: 680 ft (210 m)
- Tip: 680 ft (210 m)

Technical details
- Material: Composite
- Floor count: 50
- Floor area: 1,122,439 ft^{2} (104,278.0 m^{2})

Design and construction
- Architects: Cesar Pelli & Associates
- Developer: Miglin-Beitler Developments

181 West Madison Street is a skyscraper located in Chicago managed and leased by MB Real Estate. Built in 1990, the building is 680 feet (207 m) tall and contains 50 floors. It is architect Cesar Pelli's first and only completed tower in the city.

The building was constructed by Miglin-Beitler Developments.

The glassy office tower's most distinctive feature is its recessed crown. The top of the building is illuminated white at the corners, as well as other various colors depending on the holiday.

In 1989, the same combination of developer (Miglin-Beitler Developments) and architect envisioned the Miglin-Beitler Skyneedle nearby. The 2,000 foot (610 m) and 125-story building would have been the tallest skyscraper in the world if completed, but plans were scrapped because of a sluggish real estate market.

== Tenants ==
- Cornerstone Research
- Marmon Group
- One Medical Group
- Northern Trust
- Quantitative Risk Management
- United States Citizenship and Immigration Services

== See also ==
- Eliel Saarinen's Tribune Tower design
- List of skyscrapers
- List of tallest buildings in the United States
- List of tallest buildings in Chicago
- World's tallest structures
