= Andrew Cunanan =

American spree killer (1969–1997)

- Cunanan in 1997
- Born: August 31, 1969; National City, California, U.S.
- Died: July 23, 1997 (aged 27); Miami Beach, Florida, U.S.
- Cause of death: Suicide by gunshot
- Other names: Andrew DeSilva; Lt. Cmdr. Andy Cummings; Drew Cunningham; Curt Matthew Demaris
- Status: Deceased
- Criminal charges: First-degree murder; Second-degree murder; Armed robbery

Details
- Date: April 27, 1997 – July 15, 1997
- Country: United States
- States: Minnesota, Illinois, New Jersey, Florida
- Killed: 5
- Weapons: .40 S&W Taurus PT100 semi-automatic pistol (Madson, Reese, Versace); Hammer (Trail); Screwdriver, hacksaw (Miglin)

Andrew Phillip Cunanan (August 31, 1969 – July 23, 1997) was an American serial killer who murdered five people over three months from April 27 to July 15, 1997. His victims include Italian fashion designer Gianni Versace and Chicago real estate developer Lee Miglin, as well as his former boyfriend David Madson and friend Jeffrey Trail. Cunanan killed himself on July 23, 1997, eight days after murdering Versace. Cunanan's status as a serial killer versus a spree killer has been disputed, as multiple sources, including the Federal Bureau of Investigation, list him as a serial killer.

== Early life and education ==
The youngest of four children, Andrew Cunanan was born August 31, 1969, in National City, California, to Modesto "Pete" Dungao Cunanan and Mary Anne Schillaci. Modesto was serving in the United States Navy in the Vietnam War at the time of his son's birth. After leaving the navy, where he had served as a chief petty officer, Modesto worked as a stockbroker.

In his youth, Cunanan lived with his family in National City and attended Bonita Vista Middle School. In 1981, his father enrolled him in The Bishop's School, an independent day school located in the affluent La Jolla neighborhood of San Diego. There Cunanan met his lifelong best friend, Elizabeth "Liz" Cote. At school, he was remembered as being bright and very talkative, and testing with an IQ of 147.

As a teenager, Cunanan developed a reputation as a prolific liar, given to telling tall tales about his family and personal life, such as claiming that his mother was Jewish or alleging that his father belonged to "Filipino royalty" and served as a general under Ferdinand Marcos. He was adept at changing his appearance according to what he felt was most attractive at a given moment. Cunanan identified as gay in high school, when he began having liaisons with wealthy older men. He was voted "Most Likely Not to Be Forgotten" by his classmates, sometimes reported as "Most Likely to Be Remembered" by several media reports about Cunanan.

After graduating from high school in 1987, Cunanan enrolled at the University of California, San Diego (UC San Diego), where he majored in American history. In San Diego, Cunanan began using the surname DeSilva to disassociate himself from his Filipino heritage and present a Portuguese origin. He also adopted a more elaborate fake background, most often claiming that his father was an Israeli millionaire, that he had been disowned by his parents after coming out and that he had been previously married to a "Jewish princess".

In 1988, when Cunanan was 19, his father deserted his family and moved to the Philippines, where he remarried, to evade arrest for embezzlement. That same year, Cunanan had begun frequenting local gay clubs and restaurants, and his mother, who was a deeply religious Catholic, learned about his sexual orientation. During an argument, Cunanan threw his mother against a wall, dislocating her shoulder. In 1989, Cunanan dropped out of UC San Diego and settled in the Castro District of San Francisco, a center of gay culture, moving in with Cote and her boyfriend, Phil Merrill.

== Adult life ==
In San Francisco, Cunanan continued his practice of befriending wealthy older men, and also reportedly began creating violent pornography. He also socialized in the Hillcrest and La Jolla neighborhoods of San Diego, as well as in Scottsdale, Arizona, "apparently living off the largesse of one wealthy patron or another." Cunanan is also believed to have been dealing drugs, including prescription opioids, cocaine, and marijuana.

Cunanan allegedly first met fashion designer Gianni Versace in San Francisco in October 1990, when Versace was in town to be recognized for the costumes he had designed for the San Francisco Opera production of Richard Strauss's opera Capriccio, possibly at the nightclub 1015 Folsom. Versace's family has always denied that the two men ever met. In December 1995, Cunanan met David Madson, a Minneapolis architect, in a San Francisco bar. They began a long-distance relationship shortly after, but Madson ended the relationship in the spring of 1996, telling friends he sensed something "shady" about Cunanan. Cunanan told friends that Madson was the "love of [his] life".

In September 1996, Cunanan broke up with Norman Blachford, a wealthy older man who had been hosting and financially supporting him. He soon maxed out his credit cards. Cunanan's close friend Jeffrey "Jeff" Trail, a former Naval officer working as a district manager for a propane delivery company in Minneapolis, had told his former roommate Michael Williams that Cunanan had resumed selling drugs. Cunanan also was known to regularly consume these drugs, especially methamphetamine.

By April 1997, friends reported Cunanan was abusing painkillers and was drinking alcohol "like there was no tomorrow". Later that month, he told friends he was leaving San Diego for Minneapolis to "take care of some business matters" with Trail, who had recently distanced himself from Cunanan. Trail expected Cunanan to return to San Francisco upon leaving Minneapolis. Before Cunanan's visit, Trail told his sister that he "did not want Andrew to come." A week before his death, Trail told Williams that he had had a "huge falling out" with Cunanan and said, "I made a lot of enemies this weekend ... I've got to get out of here. They're going to kill me."

== Murders ==
=== Jeffrey Trail ===
On April 24, Cunanan and four friends attended a going-away party at Hillcrest's California Cuisine, a rare occasion when Cunanan did not cover the tab. He had reached the credit limit on both his credit cards, and had to ask for a credit extension to afford his plane ticket to Minneapolis. Upon arriving there the next day, Cunanan stayed with Madson, a mutual friend of his and Trail's, in Madson's apartment. That night, Cunanan and Madson dined at Nye's Restaurant and visited The Gay 90's nightclub. On April 26, Cunanan stayed in Trail's apartment while Trail was out of town with his boyfriend, Jon Hackett. The following afternoon, Trail told Hackett that he needed to have a "pretty important" conversation with Cunanan. When Trail and Hackett later returned to the apartment, there was no sign of Cunanan or his belongings. Trail left his apartment to see Cunanan shortly after 9 p.m. and was likely let into Madson's apartment at 9:45 p.m.

Cunanan's killings began in Minneapolis on April 27, 1997, with the murder of Trail. After an earlier argument in Trail's apartment, Cunanan stole Trail's gun and took it to David Madson's loft apartment. Cunanan phoned Trail from Madson's apartment to tell him to come and retrieve his gun. When Trail arrived, Cunanan beat him to death with a hammer in front of Madson. On April 29, one of Madson's coworkers, concerned about his absence from work, visited his apartment to check on him and discovered Trail's body rolled in a rug and placed behind a sofa. Trail's watch had stopped at 9:55 p.m., believed by authorities to be the time of the killing.

=== David Madson ===
David Jon Madson, 33, was Cunanan's second victim. Authorities believed Madson remained in his apartment with Cunanan two days after Trail's murder, as one neighbor witnessed both men in the apartment elevator on April 28, and another neighbor witnessed the pair walking Madson's dog on April 29. Investigators then treated Madson as a suspect in Trail's murder, but Madson's family insisted he was held hostage by Cunanan. On May 2, Madson and Cunanan were seen north of Minneapolis, driving in Madson's Jeep and eating lunch together in a bar. The following morning, Madson's body was found on the east shore of Rush Lake near Rush City, Minnesota, with gunshot wounds to the head and back from a .40-caliber Taurus PT100 semi-automatic pistol Cunanan had taken from Trail's home.

=== Lee Miglin ===
On May 4, Cunanan drove to Chicago, Illinois, and killed 72-year-old Lee Albert Miglin, a prominent real estate developer. He bound Miglin's hands and feet and wrapped his head with duct tape, then stabbed him more than twenty times with a screwdriver, slit his throat with a hacksaw, and stole his car. Miglin's family maintain that the killing was random, but former FBI agent Gregg McCrary argues it is unlikely that Cunanan would have bound and tortured Miglin without some motive.

Investigators noted Miglin's 1994 green Lexus LS sedan was missing from his garage and found Madson's red Jeep parked on the street near Miglin's house. Miglin's Lexus was equipped with a car phone, which, according to records, was activated on May 4 in Union County, Pennsylvania. Authorities began monitoring the phone's activity and found it was also activated on May 8 in Philadelphia and on May 9 near Penns Grove and Carneys Point Township, New Jersey.

=== William Reese ===
On May 9, in Pennsville Township, New Jersey, at Finn's Point National Cemetery, Cunanan shot and killed 45-year-old cemetery caretaker William Richard "Bill" Reese. Later that day, when Reese did not return home for dinner, his wife visited the cemetery to check on him and found the caretaker's office door ajar with the radio playing inside. She then called the police, who found Reese shot in the head by the same Taurus pistol Cunanan used to murder Madson. Unlike Cunanan's other victims, whom he killed for seemingly personal reasons, authorities believe Cunanan murdered Reese simply for his 1995 red Chevrolet pickup truck. Cunanan used this truck to drive to Florida.

On May 12, Cunanan began staying at the Normandy Plaza Hotel in Miami Beach, Florida, where he paid $29 per night in cash. On June 12, he was listed on the FBI Ten Most Wanted Fugitives list. While the manhunt unsuccessfully focused on Reese's stolen truck that Cunanan was using, he "hid in plain sight" for two months. Cunanan used his own name to pawn a stolen item on July 7, despite knowing that police routinely reviewed pawn shop records. On July 14, seemingly out of money, Cunanan checked out of his hotel without paying for his last night there.

=== Gianni Versace ===
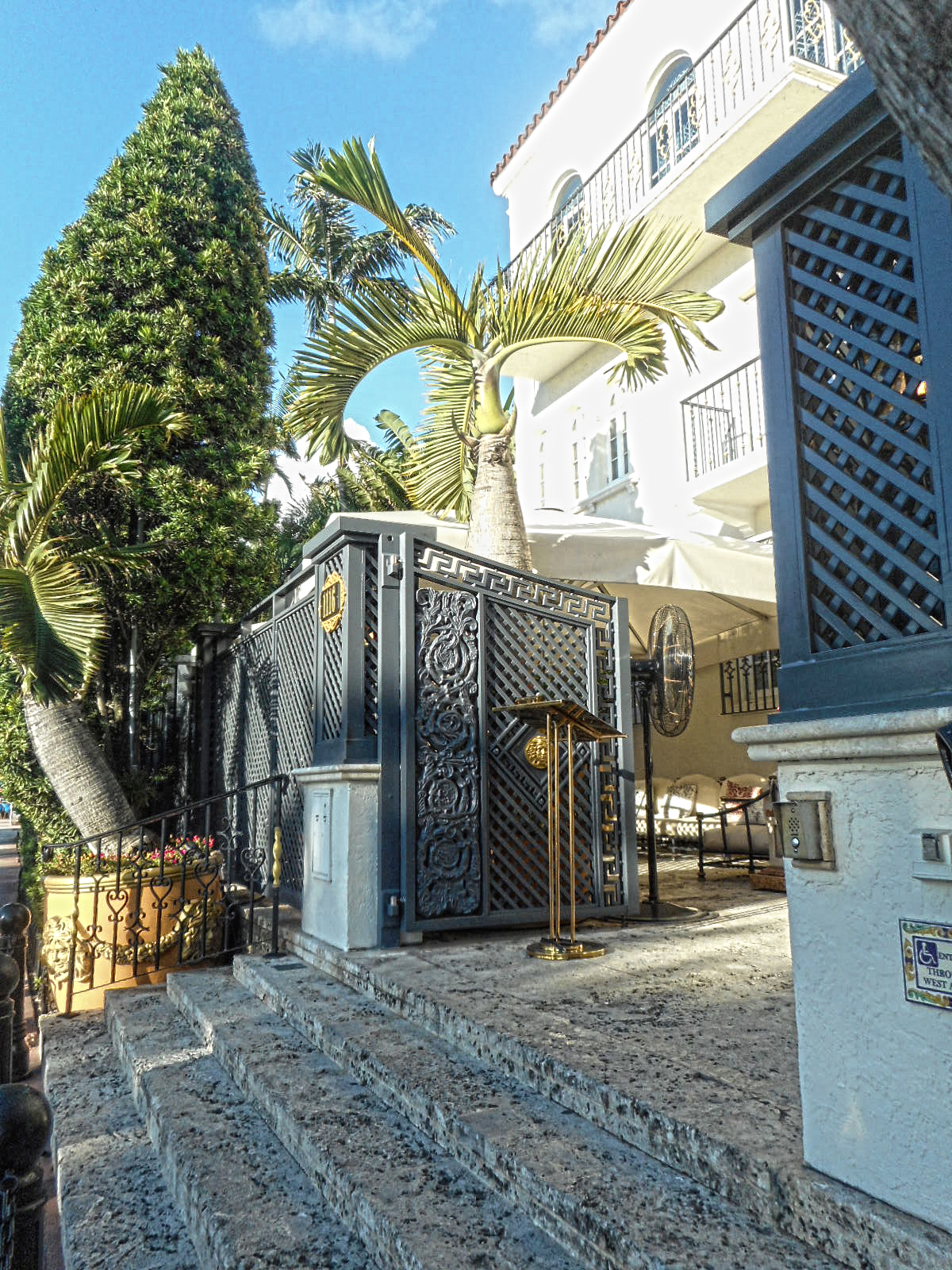
Entrance to the Versace mansion where Cunanan shot Gianni Versace

Around 8:45 am on July 15, 1997, Cunanan murdered 50-year-old Giovanni Maria "Gianni" Versace on the front steps of Casa Casuarina, his mansion in Miami Beach. Versace was returning from a visit to the News Cafe, where he picked up magazines, when he was shot once in the back of the head and once in the left cheek with the same Taurus pistol Cunanan used to murder Madson and Reese. A witness pursued Cunanan but was unable to catch him as he fled into a nearby parking garage. Versace was pronounced dead at Jackson Memorial Hospital at 9:21 a.m. Responding police found Reese's stolen vehicle in a nearby parking garage. It contained Cunanan's clothes and clippings of newspaper reports about the earlier murders.

=== Motives ===
Cunanan's motivation remains unknown. At the time of the murders, there was extensive public and press speculation linking the crimes to Cunanan's alleged discovery that he was HIV positive, although an autopsy revealed he was HIV negative. Although police searched the houseboat where Cunanan died, he left no suicide note and few personal belongings. Investigators noted Cunanan's reputation for acquiring money and expensive possessions from wealthy older men. Police considered few of the findings to be of note, except multiple tubes of hydrocortisone cream and a fairly extensive collection of fiction by C. S. Lewis. Later examination of his behavior indicates that Cunanan may have had antisocial personality disorder, characterized by a lack of remorse and empathy.

== Suicide ==
On July 23, 1997, Cunanan's body was found in a luxury houseboat in Miami Beach, after a caretaker reported to police of hearing a gunshot. He had shot himself in the head with the Taurus pistol stolen from Trail; it was the same weapon he used to kill Madson, Reese, and Versace. Cunanan's cremated remains are interred in the mausoleum at Holy Cross Cemetery in San Diego.

== Aftermath ==
Cunanan's father Modesto, who was living in Plaridel, Bulacan, during the murders, reportedly abandoned his house after Cunanan was identified in the spree killings following the murder of Versace, leaving behind a white cross wrapped with a blue ribbon and a note stating, "My son was an altar boy. He is not a serial killer or a homosexual".

In September 1997, Modesto Cunanan, who maintained his son's innocence, told the Los Angeles Times that he planned to make a documentary about Cunanan with filmmaker Amable "Tikoy" Aguiluz. Modesto stated that he believed Cunanan was framed in a "deep cover-up" by "renegade FBI", stating that he had turned down two offers by two film studios in the Philippines believing they would vilify his son in the FBI's favor. Modesto also sought to be named executor over Cunanan's estate, as he intended to use any money generated from it to fund the Montana-based Church Universal and Triumphant, saying he intended to build a religious site in his son's memory using the documentary's revenue. As of 2018, it remained unclear whether the project was ever finished.

== In popular culture ==
Cunanan was portrayed by Shane Perdue in the film The Versace Murder (1998); Jonathan Trent in the film Murder in Fashion (2009); Luke Morrison in the television film House of Versace (2013); and Darren Criss (who won an Emmy Award for his performance) in The Assassination of Gianni Versace (2018), the second season of the television series American Crime Story. Cunanan has been referenced in songs by Shyne ("Bad Boyz", 2000), Eminem ("Criminal", 2000), Modest Mouse ("Pistol (A. Cunanan, Miami, FL. 1996)", 2015), and Mickey Avalon ("Stroke Me", 2009).

He has also been the subject of several true crime television series' episodes: Mugshots on Court TV, with "Andrew Cunanan – The Versace Killer", and Six Degrees of Murder, with "The Body in the Rug". He has also been featured on ABC's news television series 20/20, and Investigation Discovery's show Most Evil in various episodes, where he is examined by Columbia University forensic psychiatrist Michael H. Stone, as well as a two-hour episode of Dateline NBC.

== See also ==
- List of serial killers in the United States

== Bibliography and further reading ==
- Alvarez, Alex; Bachman, Ronet (2003). Murder American Style. Wadsworth. ISBN 978-0-534-53470-7.
- Ascione, Frank; Arkow, Phil (1999). Child Abuse, Domestic Violence, and Animal Abuse: Linking the Circles of Compassion for Prevention and Intervention. Purdue University Press. ISBN 978-1-55753-142-1.
- Clarkson, Wensley (1997). Death at Every Stop. Macmillan Inc. ISBN 978-0-312-96636-2.
- Hendershott, Anne (2002). The Politics of Deviance. Encounter Books. ISBN 978-1-893554-47-4.
- Indiana, Gary (1999). Three Month Fever: The Andrew Cunanan Story. Quartet Books. ISBN 978-0-7043-8116-2.
- Orth, Maureen (2000). Vulgar Favors: Andrew Cunanan, Gianni Versace, and the Largest Failed Manhunt in U.S. History. Random House Publishing Group. ISBN 978-0-440-22585-0.
- Walsh, John; Lerman, Philip (1999). No Mercy: The Host of America's Most Wanted Hunts the Worst Criminals of Our Time - In Shattering True Crime Cases. Pocket Star Books. ISBN 978-0-671-01994-5.
