= 200 West Madison =

Office skyscraper in Chicago, Illinois

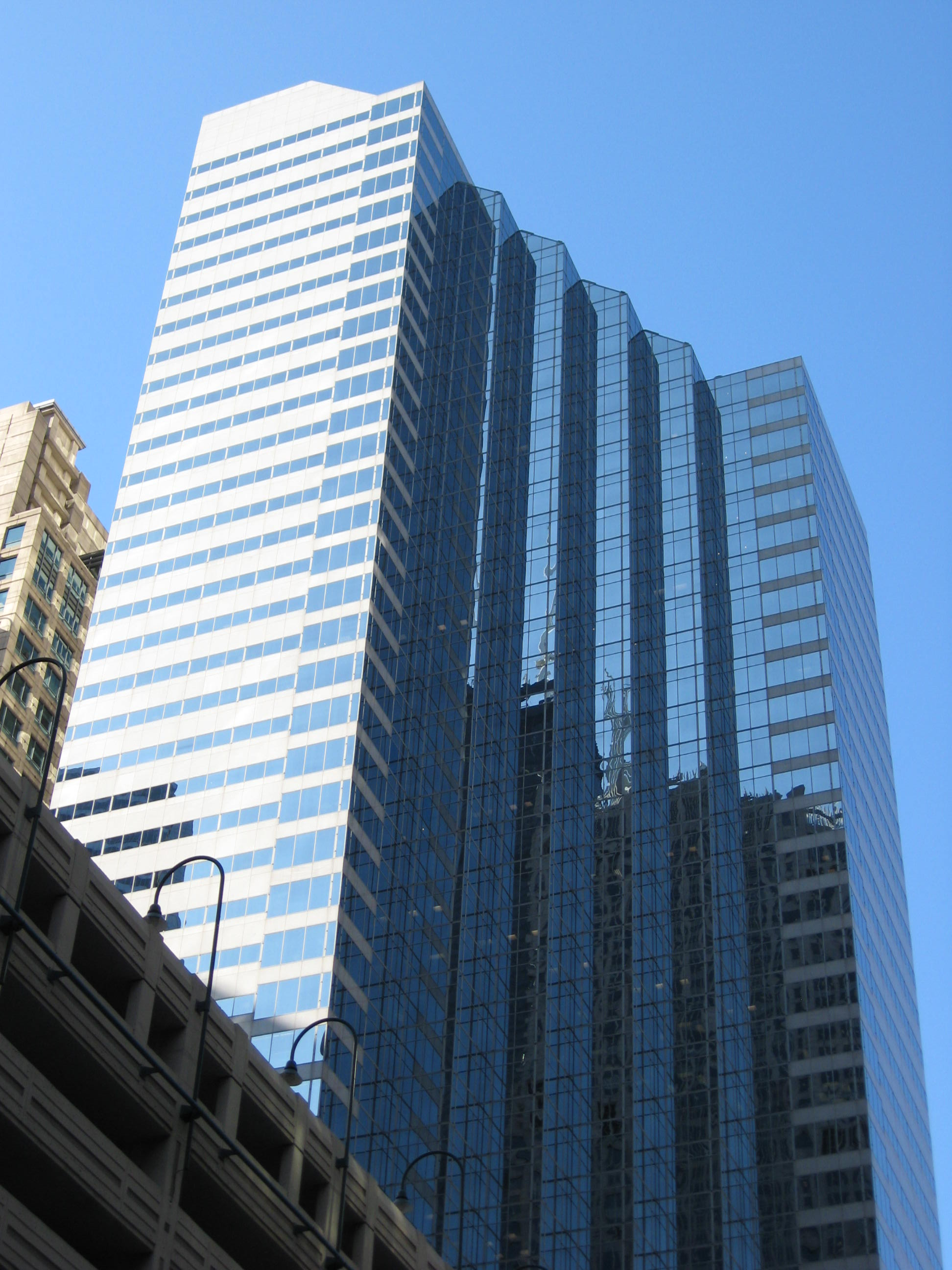
- Interactive map of the 200 West Madison area

General information
- Status: Completed
- Type: Office
- Location: 200 West Madison Street, Chicago, Illinois, United States
- Coordinates: 41°52′56″N 87°38′05″W
- Construction started: 1981
- Completed: 1982
- Opening: 1982

Height
- Roof: 599 ft (183 m)

Technical details
- Floor count: 45
- Floor area: 1,035,790 ft^{2} (96,228 m^{2})

Design and construction
- Architect: Skidmore, Owings & Merrill
- Developer: Miglin-Beitler Developments

200 West Madison is a skyscraper in Chicago, Illinois. The building rises 599 feet (182 m) in the Chicago Loop. It contains 45 floors, and was completed in 1982. 200 West Madison currently stands as the 52nd-tallest building in the city. The architectural firm who designed the building was Skidmore, Owings & Merrill, the same firm who designed Chicago's Willis Tower and John Hancock Center and the Burj Khalifa in Dubai.

The building was designed with a "sawtooth edge," and incorporates six corners onto the southeast face of the building. Thus, the building has nine corner offices on most of its floors. Originally named "Madison Plaza," the building was proposed to have a twin tower located on the lot situated south of the tower. However, plans for a second tower were ultimately abandoned. Six years later, in 1988, the Miglin-Beitler Skyneedle was proposed for construction on the same lot, adjacent to 200 West Madison. Plans called for 125-story tower that was to rise 2,000 ft (610 m). However, that plan was also eventually cancelled. The lot is now the site of a parking garage.

200 West Madison is the location of "Dawn Shadows," a famous black metal sculpture created by Louise Berliawsky Nevelson. The sculpture was brought to the plaza in 1983.

== Tenants ==
United Airlines previously maintained a ticketing office in this building.

== See also ==
- List of tallest buildings in Chicago
- Chicago architecture
