= List of Art Deco architecture in Florida =

This is a list of buildings that are examples of the Art Deco architectural style in Florida, United States.

== Fort Lauderdale ==
- Birch Tower Sky Garden, Fort Lauderdale
- Elbo Room, Fort Lauderdale, 1938
- Las Olas Beach Club, Fort Lauderdale

== Fort Myers ==
- Edison Theater, Fort Myers Downtown Commercial District, Forty Myers, 1939
- Elks Club, Fort Myers, 1937
- Franklin Shops, Fort Myers

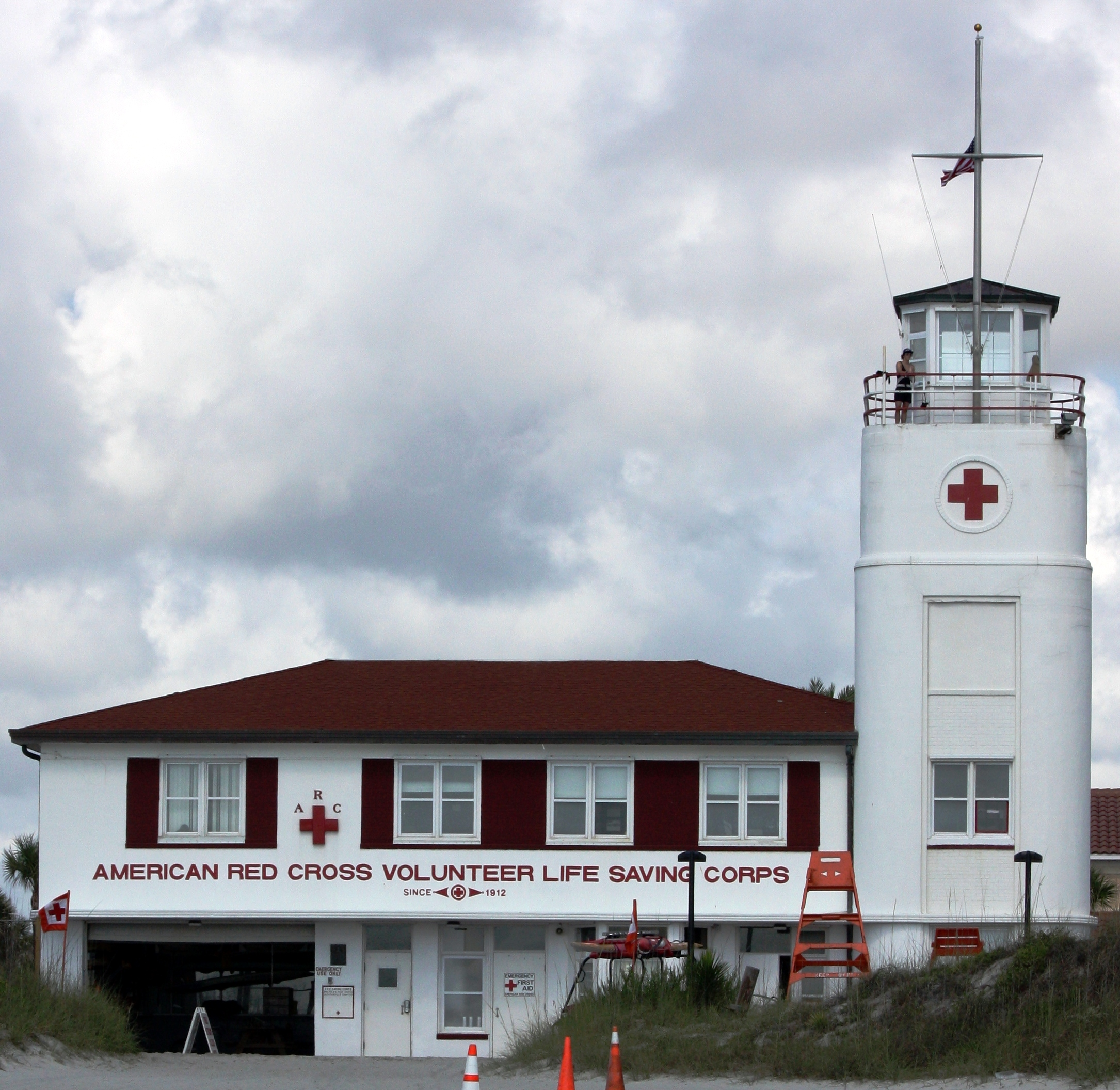
American Red Cross Volunteer Life Saving Corps Station, Jacksonville, Florida

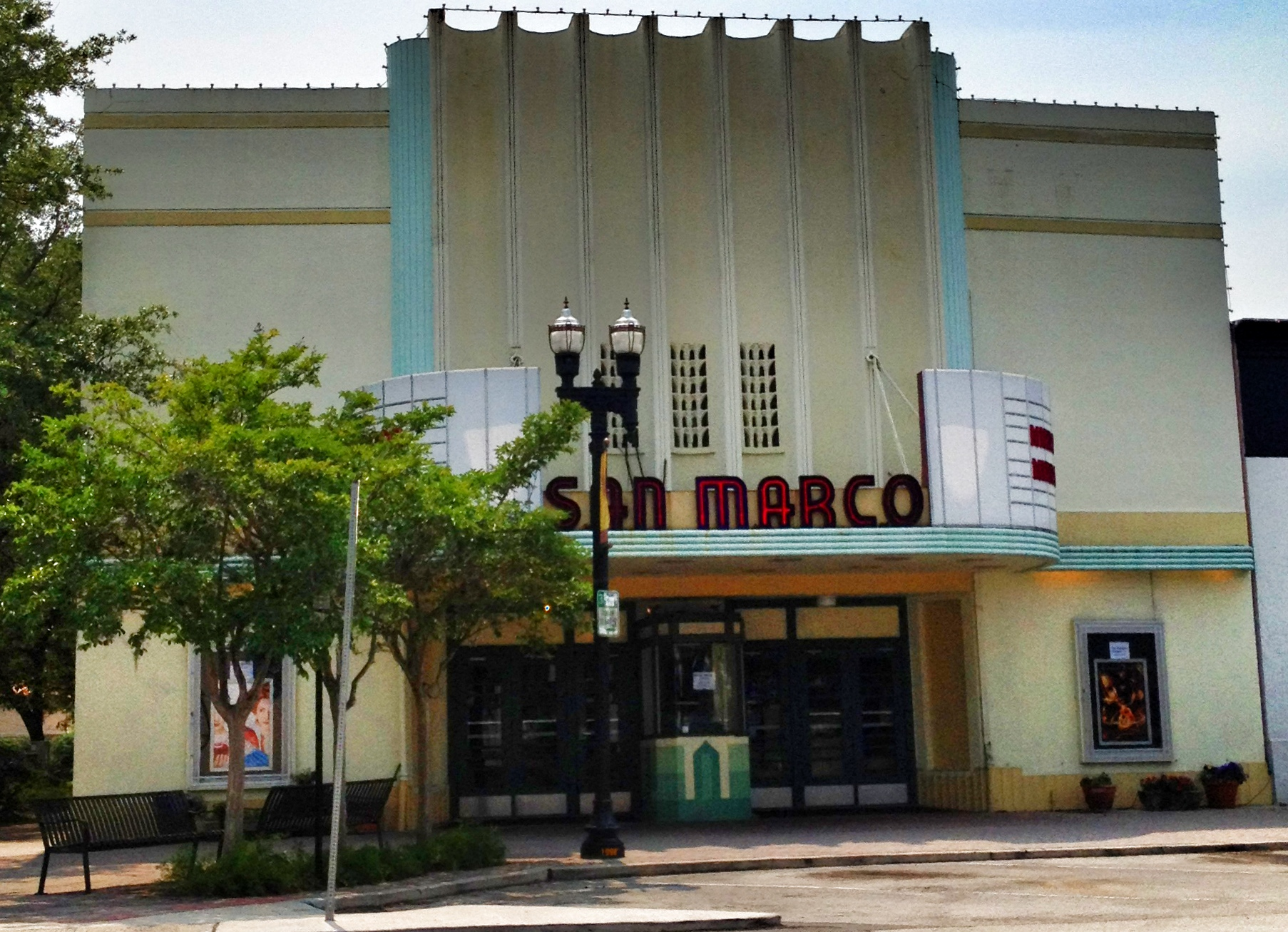
San Marco Theatre, Jacksonville, Florida

== Jacksonville ==
- Adel Supermarket (now Winn-Dixie), Jacksonville, 1940s
- American Red Cross Volunteer Life Saving Corps Station, Jacksonville, 1947
- Carter's Park & King Pharmacy, Jacksonville, 1942
- Central Fire Station, Jacksonville, 1901 and 1944
- Cummer Museum of Art and Gardens, Jacksonville, 1961
- Ed Austin Building (now State Attorney's Office), Jacksonville, 1933
- Groover-Stewart Drug Company Building, Jacksonville, 1925
- Museum of Contemporary Art Jacksonville (former Western Union Telegraph Company), Jacksonville, 1931
- Ritz Theatre, Jacksonville, 1929
- San Marco Theatre (former Cine San Marco), Jacksonville, 1938
- Theatre Jacksonville, Jacksonville, 1938

== Miami ==
- 828 NW 9th Court, Miami, 1938
- Ace Theatre, Miami, 1930
- Alfred I. DuPont Building, Miami, 1939
- Burdines Department Store, Downtown Miami Historic District, Miami, 1920s and 1936
- Hotel Shelley, Miami
- Huntington Building, Miami, 1926
- McCrory Store Building, Downtown Miami Historic District, Miami, 1938
- Miami City Hall, Miami, 1934
- Olympia Theater, Miami, 1926
- S & S Sandwich Shop, Miami, 1938
- St. John's Baptist Church, Miami, 1940
- St. Sophia Greek Orthodox Cathedral, Miami
- Scottish Rite Masonic Temple, Miami, 1924
- Sears, Roebuck and Company Department Store, Miami, 1929
- Shrine Building, Miami, 1930
- Tower Theater, Little Havana, Miami, 1926
- W. T. Grant Building, Downtown Miami Historic District, Miami, 1906 and 1937
- Walgreen Drug Store, Miami, 1936
- Walker-Skagseth Food Stores, Downtown Miami Historic District, Miami, 1920 and 1934
- Woolworth's Building, Downtown Miami Historic District, Miami, 1903 and 1938

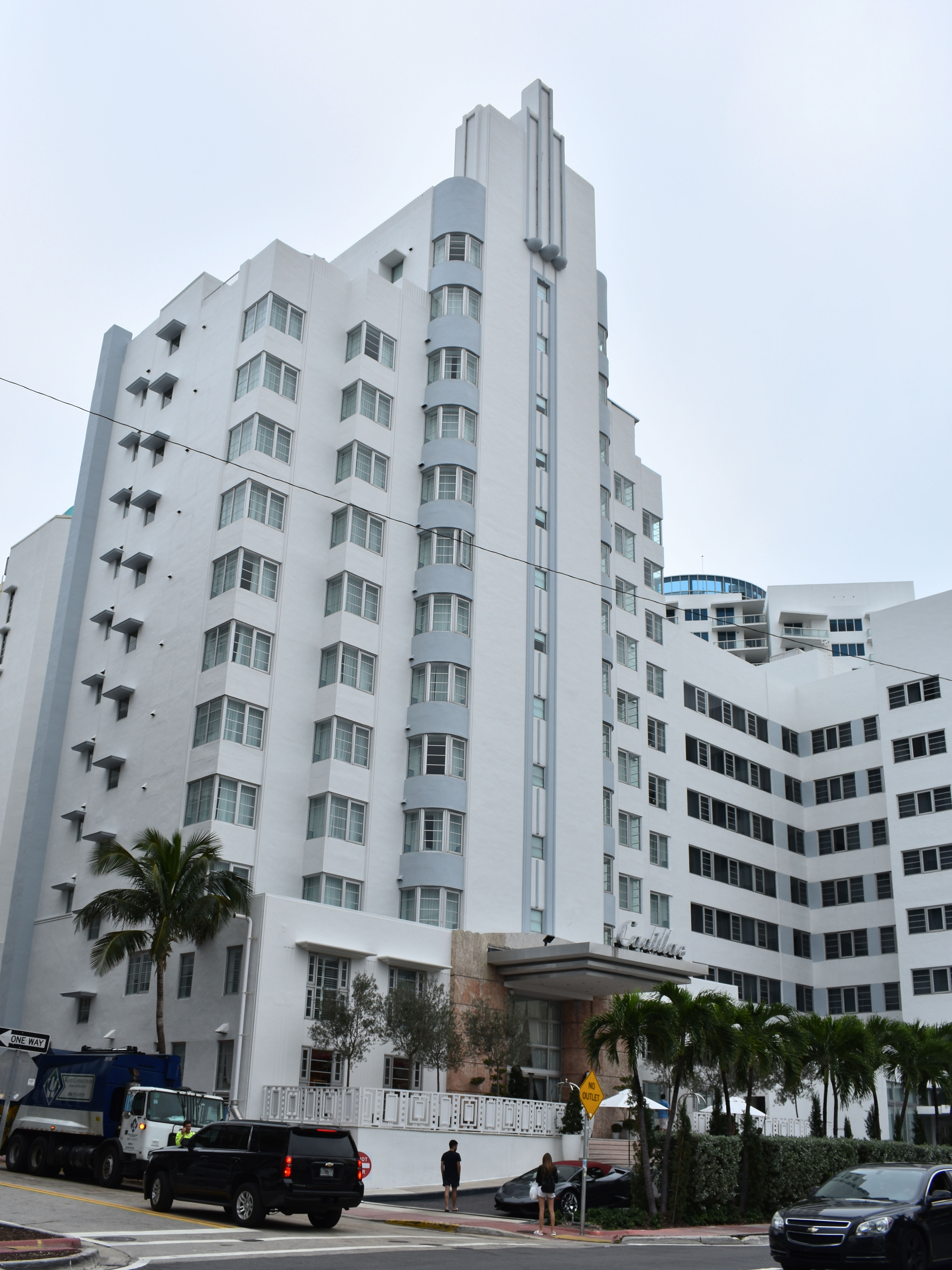
Cadillac Hotel & Beach Club, Miami Beach, Florida

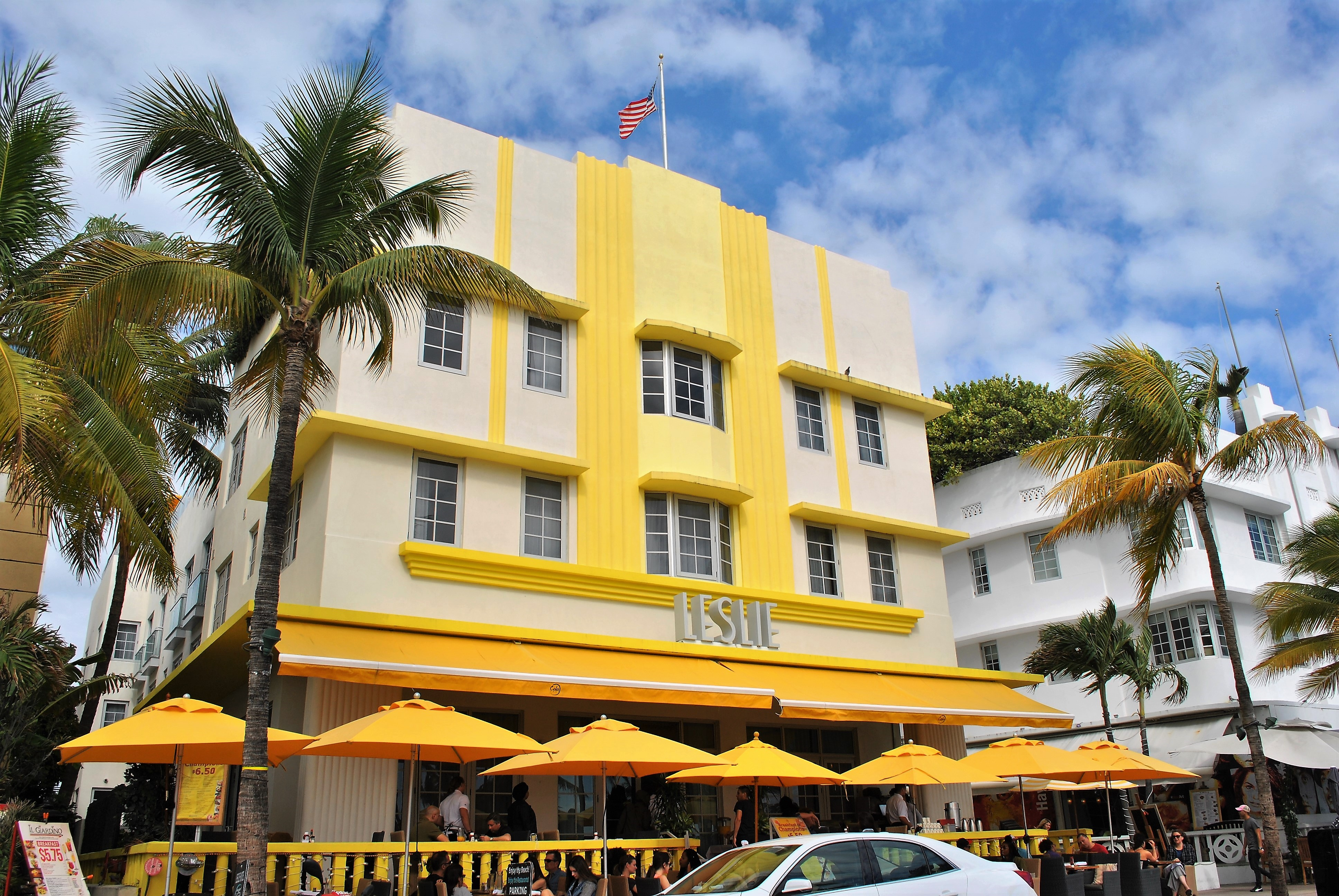
The Leslie Hotel, Miami Beach, Florida

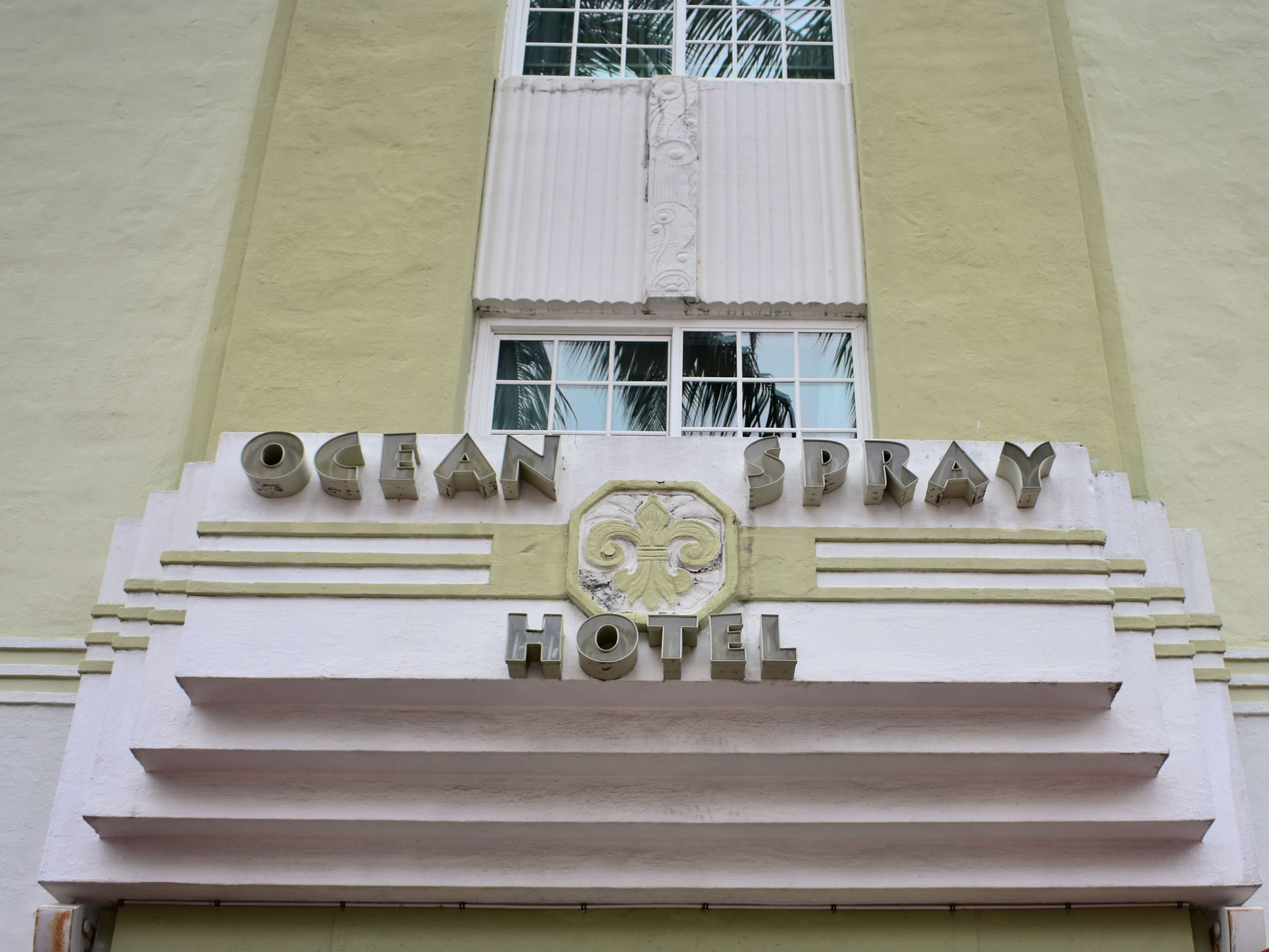
Ocean Spray Hotel, Miami Beach, Florida

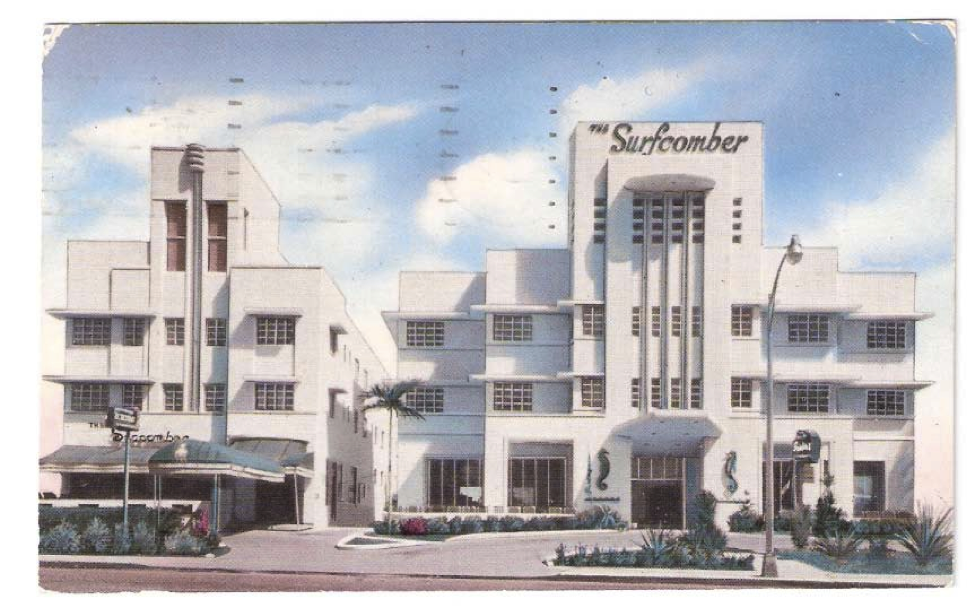
Surfcomber Hotel, Miami Beach, Florida

== Miami Beach ==
- 1200 Washington Avenue, Miami Beach
- 2615 Collins Avenue, Miami Beach, 1935
- Abbey Hotel, South Beach, Miami Beach
- Albion Hotel, Miami Beach, 1939
- Alden Hotel, Miami Beach, 1936
- Avalon, Miami Beach Architectural District, Miami Beach, 1941
- Bass Museum, Miami Beach, 1934
- Beach Patrol Headquarters, Miami Beach
- The Beachcomber (former Shepley Hotel), Miami Beach, 1938
- Beacon, Miami Beach Architectural District, Miami Beach, 1936
- Bellamar Hotel, Miami Beach, 1939
- Beth Jacob Social Hall and Congregation, Miami Beach, 1928
- Breakwater, Miami Beach Architectural District, Miami Beach, 1939
- Cadillac Hotel & Beach Club, Miami Beach, 1950s
- Cameo Theater, Miami Beach, 1938
- Cardozo, Miami Beach Architectural District, Miami Beach, 1939
- Caribbean Building, Miami Beach, 1941
- Carlton Hotel, Miami Beach, 1938
- Carlyle Hotel, Miami Beach, 1941
- Castle Beach Apartments, Miami Beach, 1936
- Cavalier, Miami Beach Architectural District, Miami Beach, 1936
- Century Hotel, Miami Beach, 1939
- Churchill Apartments, Collins Waterfront Architectural District, Miami Beach, 1940
- Clevelander, Miami Beach Architectural District, Miami Beach, 1939
- Clinton Hotel, Miami Beach, 1930s
- Colony Hotel, Miami Beach Architectural District, Miami Beach, 1935
- Copley Plaza, Miami Beach, 1940
- Crescent Hotel, Miami Beach, 1932
- Croydon Arms, Miami Beach, 1937
- Delano Hotel, Miami Beach, 1947
- Eden Roc Miami Beach Hotel, Miami Beach, 1956
- Edison, Miami Beach Architectural District, Miami Beach, 1935
- Embassy Hotel, Miami Beach, 1935
- Empire Hotel, Miami Beach
- Essex House, Miami Beach Architectural District, Miami Beach, 1938
- Fairwind Hotel (former Fairmont Hotel), Miami Beach, 1939
- Flamingo Apartments, Collins Waterfront Architectural District, Miami Beach, 1940
- Greenbrier Hotel, Collins Waterfront Architectural District, Miami Beach, 1940
- Greystone Miami Beach, Miami Beach, 1939
- Haddon Hall Hotel, Miami Beach, 1939
- Helen Mar Apartments, Miami Beach, 1936
- Hoffman's Cafeteria (now Señor Frog's), Miami Beach, 1939
- Hotel Versailles, Collins Waterfront Architectural District, Miami Beach, 1940
- Imperial, Miami Beach Architectural District, Miami Beach, 1939
- Indian Creek Hotel, Collins Waterfront Architectural District, Miami Beach, 1936
- Lake Drive Apartments, Miami Beach, 1936
- The Leslie Hotel, Ocean Drive, Miami Beach, 1937
- Lincoln–Drexel Building, Lincoln Road, Miami Beach
- Lincoln Theatre, Miami Beach, 1936
- Lord Baltimore Hotel, Collins Waterfront Architectural District, Miami Beach, 1941
- Lord Tarleton Hotel, Collins Waterfront Architectural District, Miami Beach, 1940
- Majestic, Miami Beach Architectural District, Miami Beach, 1940
- Malabo Apartment Hotel, Collins Waterfront Architectural District, Miami Beach, 1947
- Marlin Hotel, Miami Beach Architectural District, Miami Beach
- Miami Beach Post Office, Miami Beach, 1937
- Miljean Hotel, Miami Beach, 1940
- Netherlands, Miami Beach Architectural District, Miami Beach, 1935
- Ocean Spray Hotel, Miami Beach, 1936
- Palms Apartments, Collins Waterfront Architectural District, Miami Beach, 1936
- Park Central, Miami Beach Architectural District, Miami Beach, 1937
- Ritz Plaza Hotel, Miami Beach, 1939
- Riviera Condo, Collins Waterfront Architectural District, Miami Beach, 1939
- San Juan Hotel, Miami Beach, 1930s
- Sea-Jay Building, Collins Waterfront Architectural District, Miami Beach, 1937
- Shelborne Beach Resort, Miami Beach, 1940
- SLS South Beach Hotel, Miami Beach, 1939
- Sovereign Building, Collins Waterfront Architectural District, Miami Beach, 1941
- Stardust Apartments, South Beach, Miami Beach
- Surfcomber Hotel, South Beach, Miami Beach, 1948
- Taft Hotel, Miami Beach, 1936
- Traymore Hotel, Collins Waterfront Architectural District, Miami Beach, 1939
- Waldorf Towers, Miami Beach Architectural District, Miami Beach, 1937
- Webster Hotel, Miami Beach, 1936
- Wilshire Building, Collins Waterfront Architectural District, Miami Beach, 1939
- Wolfsonian-FIU, Florida International University, Miami Beach, 1936

== Opa-locka ==
- City Hall, Opa-locka, 1928
- King Trunk Factory and Showroom, Opa-locka, 1926
- Opa-Locka Railroad Station (now Harry Hurt Building), Opa-locka, 1926

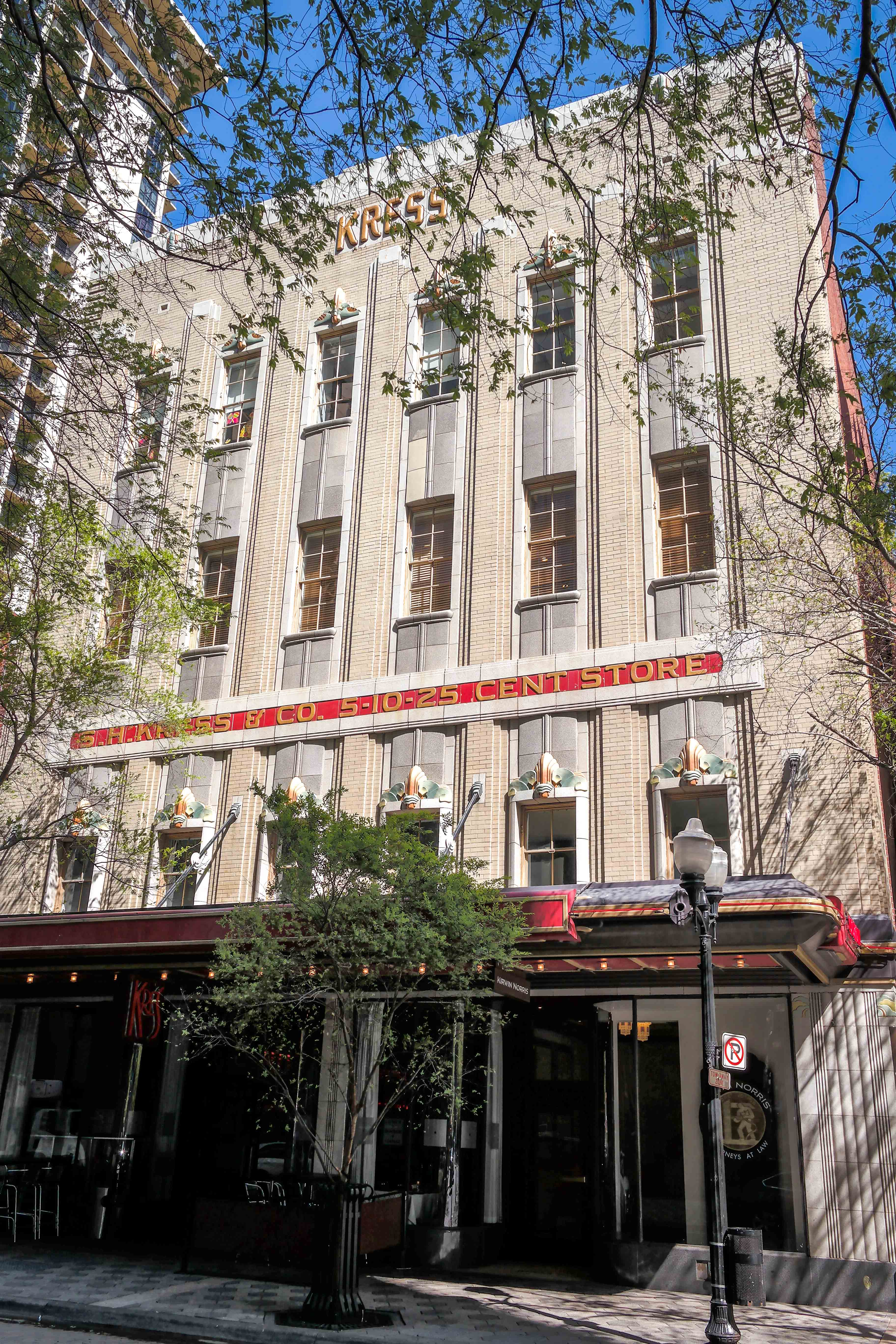
S. H. Kress and Co. Building, Orlando, Florida

== Orlando ==
- 1220 Catherine Street, Lake Davis, Orlando, 1936
- 324 DeSoto Circle, Orlando, 1939
- 711 North Lake Davis Drive Bungalows, Lake Davis Park, Orlando, 1948
- ABC Commissary, Disney Hollywood Studios, Walt Disney World, Orlando, 1989
- Baldwin–Fairchild Conway Funeral Home, Orlando, 1940
- Beacham Theater (now a nightclub), Orlando, 1921 and 1936
- The Cameo (former Cameo Theatre), Orlando, 1940
- Colonial Photo & Hobby, Orlando, 1958
- Gibbs Louis House, Orlando
- Lake Eola Park Bandshell, Orlando
- Pantages Theater, Universal Studios, Orlando
- Publix, Orlando, late 1940s
- S. H. Kress and Co. Building, Orlando, 1936
- Track Shack, Orlando
- Washburn Imports, Orlando

== St. Petersburg ==
- Glory Apartments, St. Petersburg
- John & Florence McKeage House, St. Petersburg, 1938
- Myers Antiques, St. Petersburg
- Publix (now Family Dollar), St. Petersburg, 1951
- Publix (now Walgreens), St. Petersburg, 1940s

== Sarasota ==
- Chidsey Library, Sarasota, 1941
- Municipal Auditorium-Recreation Club, Sarasota, 1938
- S. H. Kress and Co. Building (Sarasota, Florida), Sarasota, 1932
- Sarasota Municipal Auditorium, Sarasota, 1938

== Tallahassee ==
- Fire Station No. 2, Tallahassee
- George Firestone Building (former Old Leon County Jail), Tallahassee, 1936
- Leon County Health Unit Building, Tallahassee, 1940

== Tampa ==
- Cuscaden Park Swimming Pool, Tampa
- Publix, Tampa, 1995
- Tampa Linen Services Building, Tampa

== Other cities ==
- 140 Monroe Drive House, West Palm Beach, 1935
- Wenger Home, 3811 Wall Street, West Palm Beach
- 1609 Tyler Street House, Hollywood, 1965
- Amelia Island Museum of History, Fernandina Beach, 1938
- Celebration AMC Theater, Celebration, 1996
- Centennial Building, Port St. Joe, 1938
- Central Station, Sebring, 1927
- Clune Building, Miami Springs, 1925
- Dixie Crystal Theatre, Clewiston, 1941
- Florida Power and Light Company Ice Plant, Melbourne, 1926
- Fox Theater, Crestview Commercial Historic District, Crestview, 1947
- Hernando Park Bandshell, Brooksville
- Lake Worth Playhouse, Lake Worth Beach, 1924
- Larimer Memorial Library, Palatka, 1929
- Library of Florida History (former Cocoa Post Office), Cocoa, 1939
- Maitland Art Center, Maitland, 1937
- Martin Theatre (former Ritz), Panama City, 1936
- Nautical Aire Apartments, Delray Beach
- Old Martin County Courthouse, Stuart, 1937
- Old West Palm Beach National Guard Armory, West Palm Beach, 1939
- Park Theater (now Hope Tabernacle), Avon Park Historic District, Avon Park, 1935
- Port Theatre Art and Culture Center, Port St. Joe, 1938
- Prince Theatre, Pahokee, 1931
- Publix (now County Tax Collector's Office), Lakeland, 1956
- Publix, Tarpon Springs, 1940s
- Publix, Winter Haven, 1940
- Punta Gorda Ice Plant, Punta Gorda, 1926
- Rex Theatre, Pensacola, 1937
- S. H. Kress and Co. Building, Daytona Beach, 1932
- Seminole Theatre (now Seminole Cultural Arts Theatre), Homestead Historic Downtown District, Homestead, 1921 and 1940
- State Theatre, Plant City, 1939
- Streamline Hotel, Daytona Beach, 1939
- Temple Beth-El, Pensacola, 1933
- Valerie Theatre Cultural Center, Inverness, 1926
- Woman's Club of Ocoee, Ocoee, 1938

== See also ==
- List of Art Deco architecture
- List of Art Deco architecture in the United States
