= Roy F. France =

American architect (1888–1972)

- Born: October 6, 1888; Hawley, Minnesota
- Died: February 15, 1972 (aged 83); Miami, Florida

Roy Franklin France (October 6, 1888 – February 15, 1972) was the American architect who is credited with creating the Miami Beach, Florida skyline.

He was originally based in the Midwest, but relocated to Miami Beach after a 1931 trip to Florida with his wife. Several of his works are listed on the National Register of Historic Places (NRHP).

Works in the Midwest include:

- Lake Shore Apartments, 470-498 Sheridan Rd. Evanston, Illinois, NRHP-listed
- Hillcrest Apartment, 1509-1515 Hinman Ave. Evanston, Illinois, NRHP-listed
- Oak Park Arms, 408 S. Oak Park Avenue, Oak Park, Illinois
- Santa Maria Apartments, 208-232 N. Oak Park Avenue and 719-729 Erie Street,

[Oak Park, Illinois]

- One or more works in NRHP-listed Hyde Park-Kenwood Historic District, Chicago, Illinois

In Miami Beach, France "designed dozens of prominent hotels in Art Deco and Post War Modern styles adapted to local conditions. His advice regarding design was, 'Let in the air and sun. That's what people come to Florida for.'" The Post War Modern style here came to be known as Miami Modern architecture.

== Works ==
Works by Roy France in the Miami Beach include (roughly from south to north):

(*=included in Collins Waterfront Architectural District)

| Name | Image | Year | Architect | Address | Notes |
|---|---|---|---|---|---|
| St. Moritz Hotel | | | Roy France | 1565 Collins Ave. 25.788871°N 80.129311°W | Now the Loews Miami Beach Hotel. |
| National Hotel | | | Roy France | 1677 Collins Ave. 25.791850°N 80.129400°W | Art Deco 14-story tower |
| Jefferson Davis* | | 1935 | Roy France | 2444 Flamingo Place; 25.801444°N 80.129119°W | Art Deco |
| Palms Apartments* | | 1936 | Roy France | 2460 Flamingo Place; 25.801695°N 80.129172°W | Art Deco |
| Edgewater Beach | | 1935 | Roy France | 1410 Ocean Drive; 25.785522°N 80.129926°W | |
| Prince Michael Hotel* | | 1951 | Roy France | 2618 Collins Ave. 25.803023°N 80.126265°W | Modern |
| Sea Isle Hotel* | | 1941 | Roy France | 3025 Collins Ave. 25.806076°N 80.124104°W | Streamline, later the Miami Beach Ocean Resort and now The Palms Hotel & Spa |
| Lord Baltimore Hotel* | | 1941 | Roy France | 3030 Collins Ave. 25.806430°N 80.124577°W | Streamline |
| Sans Souci Hotel*, now Hotel RIU Plaza | | 1949 | Roy France, Morris Lapidus | 3101 Collins Ave. 25.806789°N 80.123960°W | Modern |
| Saxony Hotel*, now Faena Hotel Miami Beach | | 1948 | Roy France | 3201 Collins Ave. 25.807403°N 80.123551°W | Modern (Post War Modern style) |
| Atlantic Beach Hotel* | | 1938 | Roy France | 3400 Collins Ave. 25.808584°N 80.123936°W | Art Deco. Now the "Faena Bazaar". |
| Versailles Hotel* | | 1940 | Roy France | 3425 Collins Ave. 25.808768°N 80.123311°W | Art Deco - Streamline |
| Patrician Hotel* | | 1937 | Roy France | 3621 Collins Ave. 25.810087°N 80.123253°W | Art Deco, now the All Seasons Hotel |
| 3700 Collins Ave. Apartments* | | 1938 | Roy France | 3700 Collins Ave. 25.810545°N 80.123613°W | Art Deco |
| Wilshire Hotel*, now "Ocean Villas" | | 1939 | Roy France | 3710 Collins Ave. 25.810658°N 80.123529°W | Streamline |
| Cadillac Hotel* | | 1940 | Roy France | 3925 Collins Ave; 25°48′43″N 80°7′23″W | Streamline (with 1956 addition designed by Melvin Grossman), NRHP-listed |
| San Marino Hotel*, now "Lexington by Hotel RL" | | 1950 | Roy France | 4299 Collins Ave. 25.814235°N 80.122597°W | Modern |
| Sovereign Hotel*, now "SOHO Beach House" | | 1941 | Roy France | 4385 Collins Ave. 25.815936°N 80.122244°W | Art Deco |
| Alamo Hotel*, now "L Hotel" or "Alamo Hotel Apartments" | | 1938 | Roy France | 4121 Indian Creek Dr. 25.813678°N 80.123540°W | Art Deco |
| Piccadilly Manor* | | 1935 | Roy France | 2445 Pine Tree Dr. 25.801484°N 80.129314°W | Streamline |
| Pines Apartments* | | 1936 | Roy France | 2463 Pine Tree Dr. 25.801694°N 80.129252°W | Art Deco. (This is other, mirror side of 2450 Flamingo Pl.?) |
| Bellamar Hotel* | | 1939 | Roy France | 220 31st St. 25.806552°N 80.124797°W | Art Deco |
| Ocean Grande Hotel* | | 1939 | Roy France | 100 37th St. 25.810205°N 80.123001°W | Art Deco |
| Casablanca, now "The Casablanca on the Ocean" | | | Roy France | 6345 Collins Ave. 25.845286°N 80.120027°W | |

He designed numerous hotels in Miami Beach which were surviving in 2018, while several others had been demolished. Demolished ones included:

- Whitman (demolished),
- Shoremede (demolished).

A number are contributing buildings in the Collins Waterfront Architectural District, listed on the National Register.
