= Fairmont El San Juan Hotel =

Casino/Resort located in Isla Verde, Puerto Rico

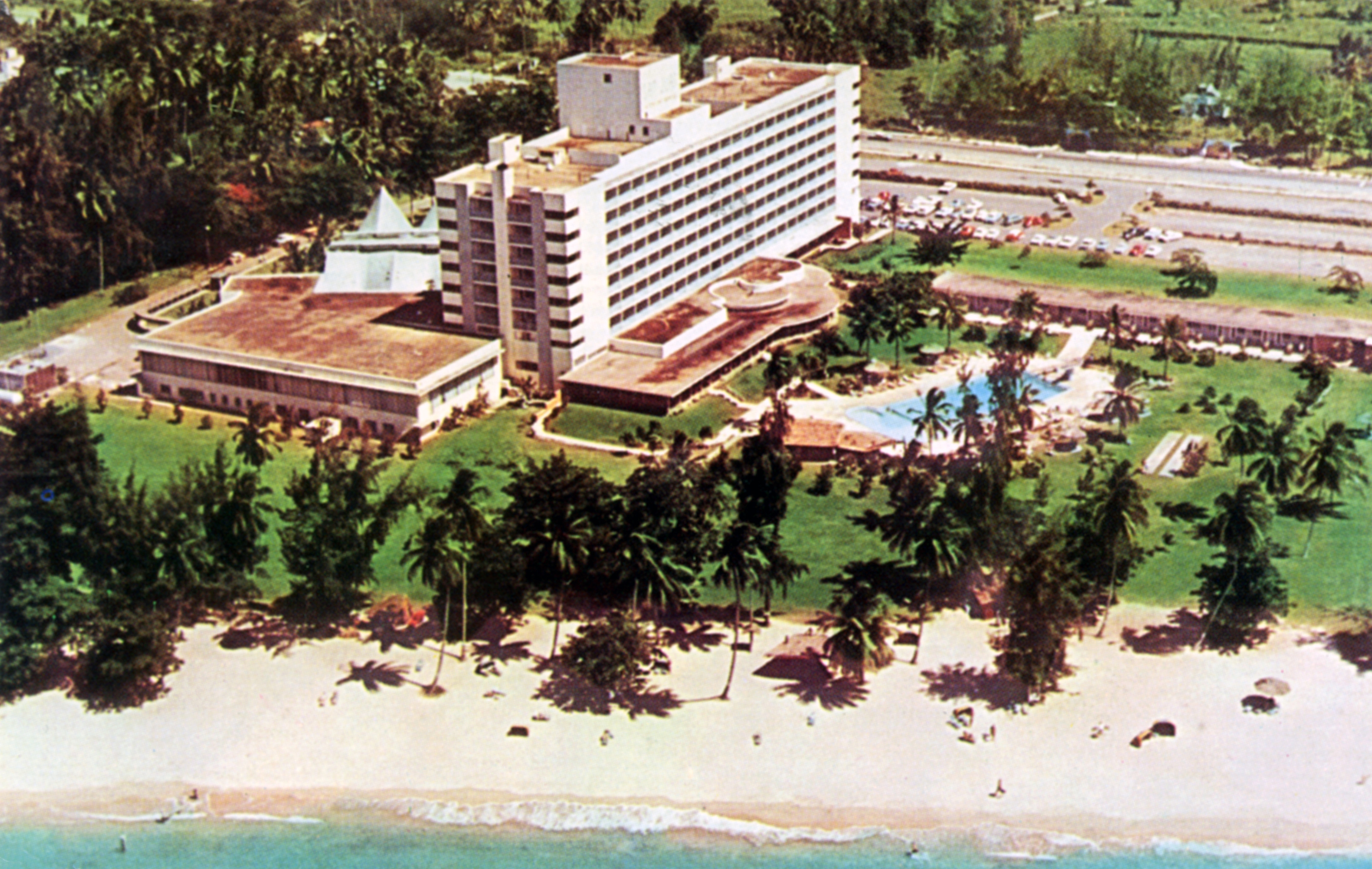
- El San Juan Hotel in 1962
- Interactive map of Fairmont El San Juan Hotel
- Location: Isla Verde, Puerto Rico; 6063 Isla Verde Avenue; 18°26′35.757″N 66°1′5.856″W
- Opened: February 1, 1958
- No. of rooms: 388
- Notable restaurants: Caña
- Owner: Liongrove
- Architect: Roy F. France
- Website: www.elsanjuanhotel.com

The Fairmont El San Juan Hotel is a historic beachfront resort in the Isla Verde resort, commercial, and residential district in the municipality of Carolina in Puerto Rico. Opened in 1958, it is currently operated by Fairmont Hotels and Resorts.

== History ==
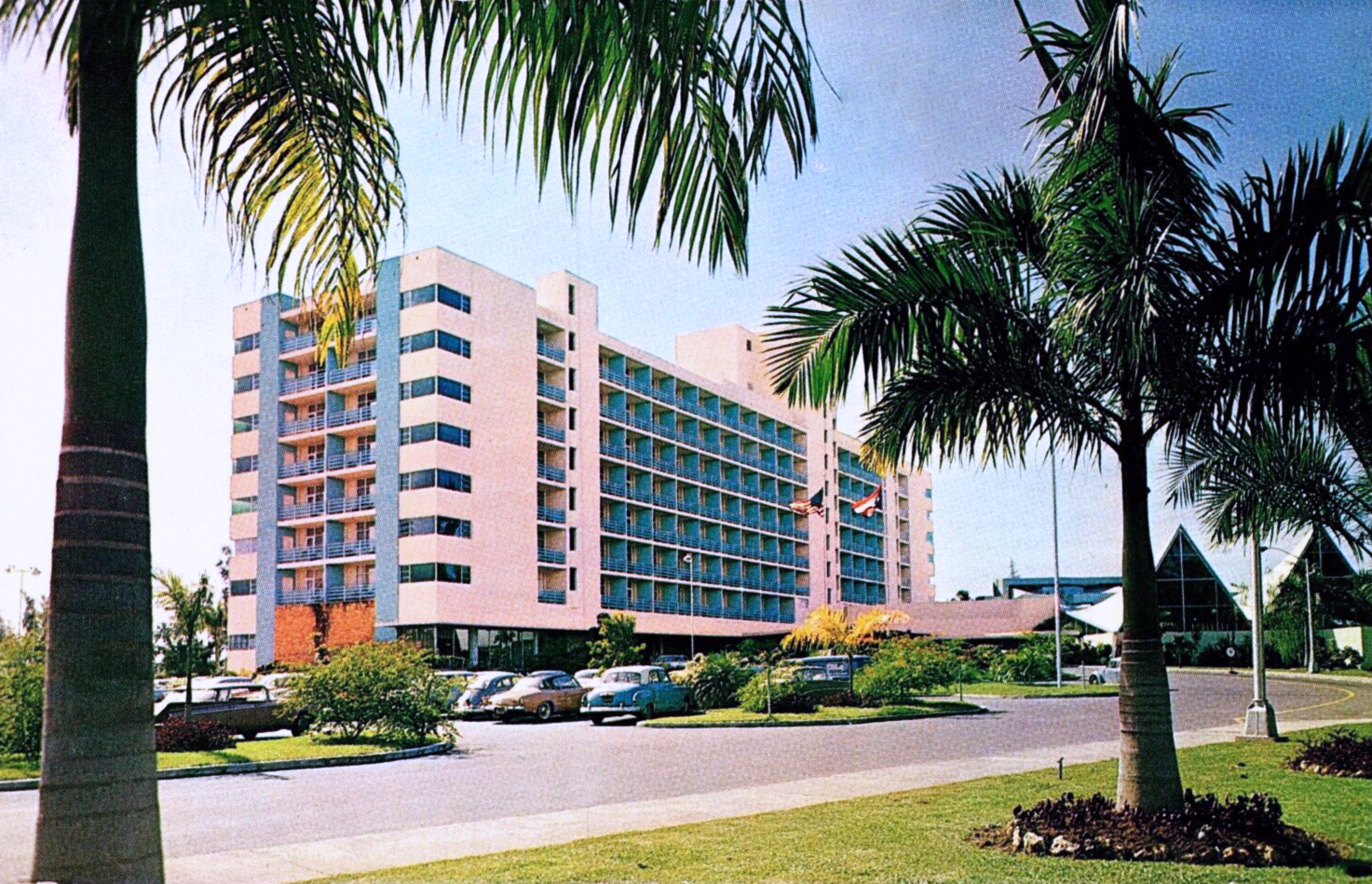
San Juan Intercontinental, 1958

The San Juan Intercontinental opened on February 1, 1958, operated by the Intercontinental Hotels division of Pan Am. It was constructed at a cost of $7.5 million by the San Juan Hotel Corporation and was designed by Miami-based architect Roy F. France, with G. Fernos Lopez serving as the San Juan-based consulting architect. The 16-acre resort had 320 rooms and boasted the largest convention hall in Latin America. The hotel's Tropicoro nightclub and adjoining casino were designed by Cuban architect Max Borges Jr., in a style similar to his earlier Tropicana Club in Havana.

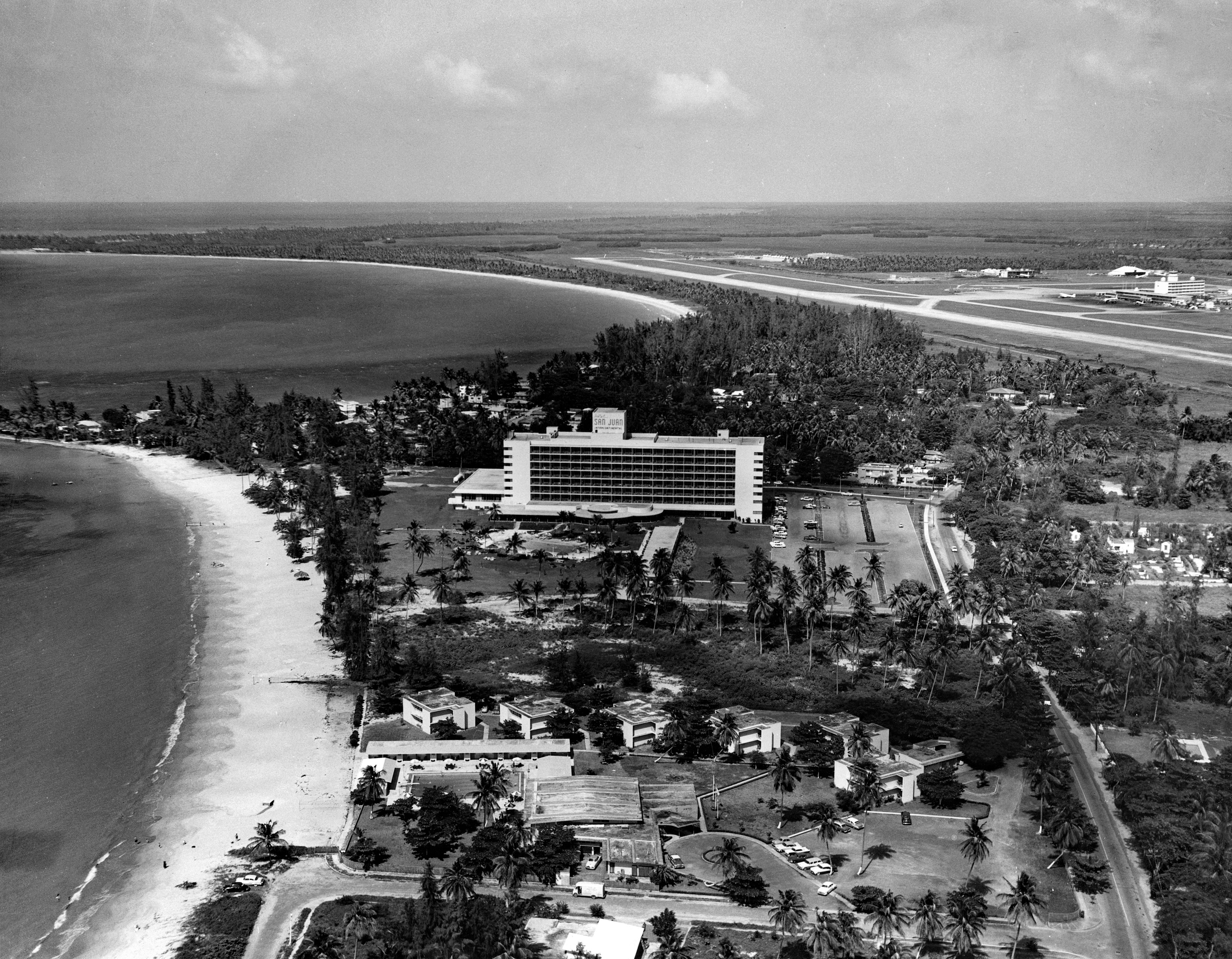
San Juan Intercontinental, 1960

In 1961, the hotel left the Intercontinental chain, becoming the El San Juan Hotel. In 1965, architect Morris Lapidus and designer Alan Lanigan renovated the hotel, including the Club Tropicoro, which hosted artists like Sammy Davis Jr., Nat King Cole, Frank Sinatra, The Supremes, Louis Armstrong, Johnny Mathis and Liza Minnelli, among others. In 1967, they also inaugurated the Hunca Munca Room for entertainment events.

In 1985, the hotel was remodeled by the Williams Hospitality Management Corporation, becoming the El San Juan Hotel & Casino. It was inaugurated by Governor Rafael Hernández Colón.

In 1998, the Banyan Tree, the 300-year-old centerpiece of the hotel, was heavily damaged by Hurricane George. A tree surgeon from Florida had to be flown in to save it.

In 2009, the El San Juan joined The Waldorf-Astoria Collection division of Hilton Worldwide and was renamed El San Juan Hotel & Casino, The Waldorf Astoria Collection. In 2011, it was transferred to the Hilton Hotels brand and was renamed El San Juan Resort & Casino, a Hilton Hotel.

In 2015, a Miami-based private equity firm called León, Mayer & Co., later known as Liongrove, purchased the hotel. The hotel closed in August 2016 for a $60 million renovation designed by Jeffrey Beers International. It reopened on February 5, 2017, as part of Hilton's Curio Collection division, renamed El San Juan Hotel, Curio Collection by Hilton.

Just months later, the hotel was hit back-to-back by Hurricane Irma and Hurricane Maria, which flooded much of the hotel. This led to another $65 million renovation. The hotel reopened in December 2018. The hotel left Hilton on January 2, 2020 and joined Accor's Fairmont Hotels division as the Fairmont El San Juan Hotel.

The hotel's thirteen one-story Banyan Villas, named for the iconic Banyan Tree and also designed by Jeffrey Beers International, were completed in 2022.

== Awards ==
- Condé Nast Traveler: Readers Choice Awards 2017, 2019, 2020, 2021, 2022, 2023, 2024
- Travel + Leisure: World's Best Awards – Favorite Resort in Puerto Rico 2024
- Historic Hotels of America Awards Finalist 2024
- USA Today 10BEST: #5 Best Hotel Pool 2024
- USA Today 10BEST: #3 Best Hotel Pool 2023
