= Collins Waterfront Architectural District =

Historic district in Florida, United States

- U.S. National Register of Historic Places
- U.S. Historic district
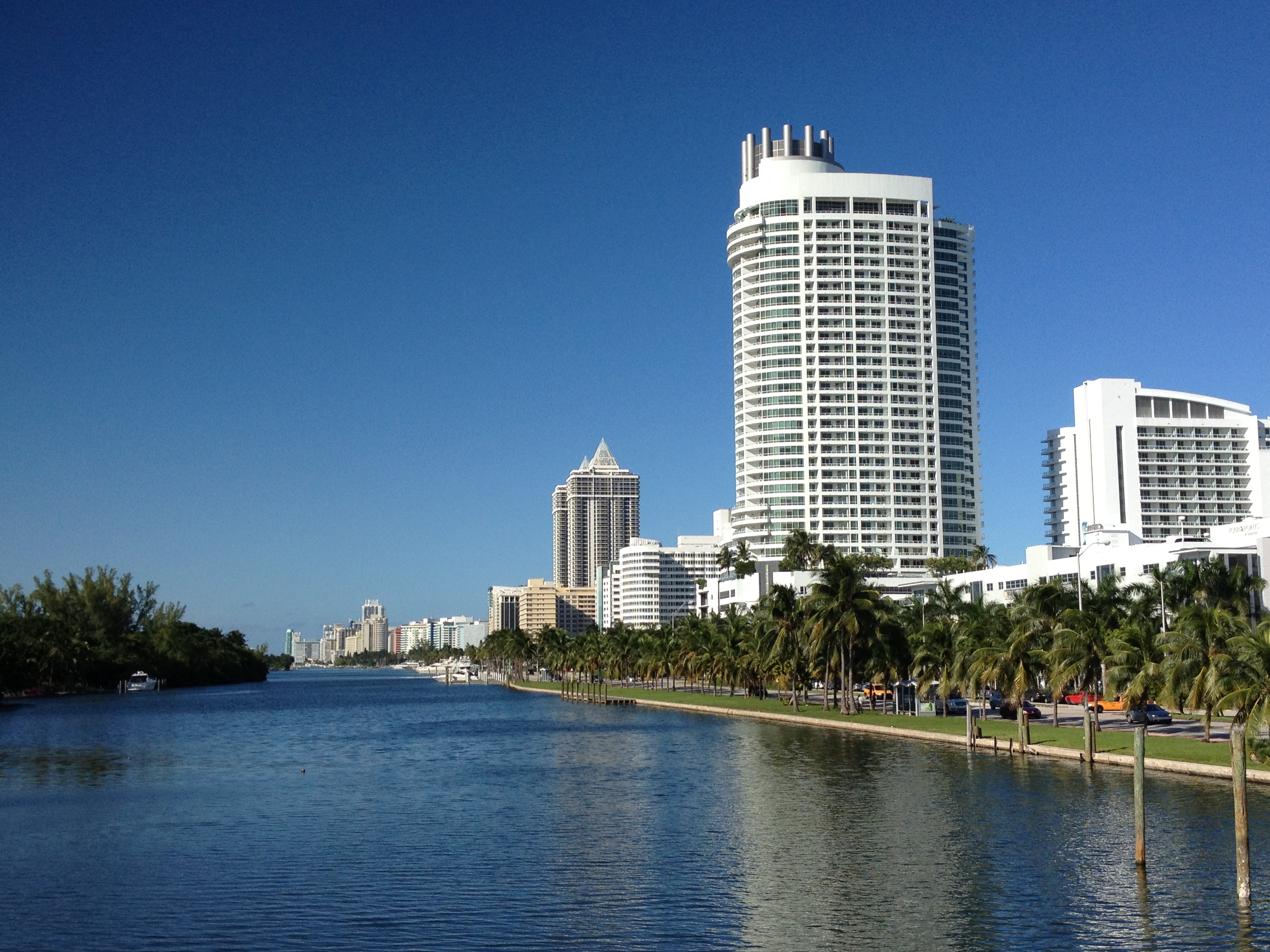
- Collins Waterfront Architectural District, looking north along Indian Creek, with Fontainebleaus I and II and the Blue and Green Diamonds in the foreground. The Akoya is visible in the far distance. The Atlantic Ocean (not pictured) is to the east.

- Location within Miami Location within Florida Location within the United States
- Location: Miami Beach, Florida
- Coordinates: 25°47′43″N 80°7′53″W
- Area: 185 acres (75 ha)
- Architect: Multiple, including Albert Anis, Roy France
- Architectural style: Art Deco, Moderne
- NRHP reference No.: 11000905
- Added to NRHP: December 15, 2011

The Collins Waterfront Architectural District is a historic district in Miami Beach, Florida, that includes 110 contributing buildings and structures built in the late 1940s, 1950s and 1960s, centering on Collins Avenue. The predominant styles include moderne, Art Deco and Mediterranean Revival architecture, as well as the local Miami Modern style. The chief contributing resources are large resort hotels. The district is bounded by the Atlantic Ocean on the east, and by 24th Street, Indian Creek Drive, Pine Tree Drive and the Collins Canal. The district is part of Mid-Beach.

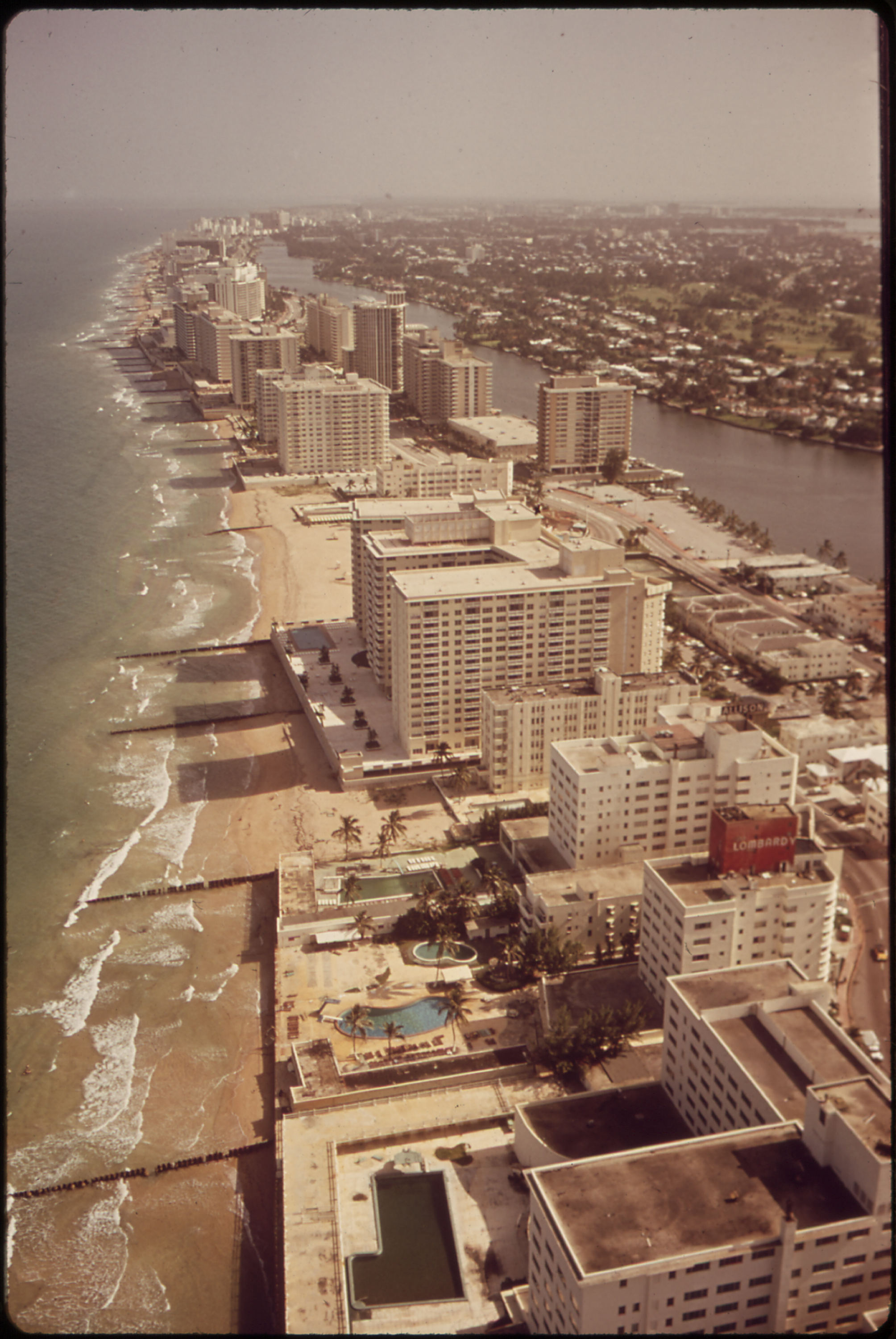
Hotel Row, along Collins Ave., 1972

The district was placed on the National Register of Historic Places on November 15, 2011. Separately listed on the NRHP already were contributing properties Cadillac Hotel, designed by Roy France, and Ocean Spray Hotel. The district includes an automotive bridge and a pedestrian bridge.

Architects responsible for work in the district include Martin L. Hampton, Russell Pancoast, Roy France, Albert Anis, Robert E. Collins, Henry Hohauser, Lawrence Murray Dixon, Harry O. Nelson, Victor H. Nellenbogen, Carlos B. Schoeppl, Melvin Grossman, Morris Lapidus, and Norman M. Giller.

A hotel included in the district is Casa Faena.

== Contributing properties ==
The Collins Waterfront Historic District Designation Report prepared by the City of Miami Beach Planning Department (August 10, 2000) provides the following list of contributing properties located in the Collins Waterfront Architectural District.

| Name | Image | Year | Architect | Address | Notes |
|---|---|---|---|---|---|
| Banana Bungalow | | 1954 | Reiff & Fellman | 2360 Collins Ave | Modern |
| Traymore Hotel | | 1939 | Albert Anis | 2445 Collins Ave | Art Deco |
| Lakeside Apartments | | 1935 | H.O. Nelson | 2615 Collins Ave | Art Deco |
| Prince Michael Hotel | | 1951 | Roy France | 2618 Collins Ave | Modern |
| Gaylord Hotel | | 1939 | Albert Anis | 2700 Collins Ave | Art Deco |
| Glades Hotel | | 1940 | Albert Anis | 2730 Collins Ave | Art Deco |
| Hampton Court Hotel | | 1924 | Martin L. Hampton | 2806 Collins Ave | Mediterranean Revival |
| La Corona Apartments | | 1924 | Hampton & Ehman | 2814 Collins Ave | Mediterranean Revival |
| Seville Hotel | | 1955 | Melvin Grossman | 2901 Collins Ave | Modern |
| Embassy Hotel | | 1935 | Martin L. Hampton | 2940 Collins Ave | Art Deco |
| Monroe Towers | | 1935 | Martin L. Hampton | 3010 Collins Ave | Art Deco |
| Sea Isle Hotel | | 1941 | Roy France | 3025 Collins Ave | Streamline |
| Lord Baltimore Hotel | | 1941 | Roy France | 3030 Collins Ave | Streamline |
| Sans Souci Hotel | | 1949 | Roy France, Morris Lapidus | 3101 Collins Ave | Modern |
| Rendale Hotel | | 1940 | E.L. Robertson | 3120 Collins Ave | Art Deco |
| Saxony Hotel | | 1948 | Roy France | 3201 Collins Ave | Modern |
| Atlantic Beach Hotel | | 1938 | Roy France | 3400 Collins Ave | Art Deco |
| Versailles Hotel | | 1940 | Roy France | 3425 Collins Ave | Art Deco - Streamline |
| Claridge Beach Hotel | | 1930 | Martin L. Hampton | 3508 Collins Ave | Mediterranean Revival |
| Patrician Hotel | | 1937 | Roy France | 3621 Collins Ave | Art Deco |
| Brisa del Mar | | 1929 | C.L. Kinports | 3624 Collins Ave | Mediterranean Revival |
| Apartments | | 1938 | Roy France | 3700 Collins Ave | Art Deco |
| Wilshire Hotel | | 1939 | Roy France | 3710 Collins Ave | Streamline |
| Croydon Arms | | 1937 | E. Dean Parmelee | 3720 Collins Ave | Art Deco |
| Caribbean Hotel | | 1941 | L. Murray Dixon | 3737 Collins Ave | Art Deco |
| Four Freedoms Hotel | | 1964 | J.H. Graham & Assoc. | 3800 Collins Ave | Modern |
| Copley Plaza Hotel | | 1940 | Albert Anis | 3900 Collins Ave | Art Deco |
| Cadillac Hotel | | 1940 | Roy France | 3925 Collins Ave | Streamline |
| Continental Hotel | | 1948 | A.H. Mathes | 4000 Collins Ave | Modern |
| Lord Tarlton Hotel | | 1940 | V.H. Nellenbogen | 4041 Collins Ave | Streamline |
| Westover Arms | | 1946 | Albert Anis | 4100 Collins Ave | Modern |
| Lucerne Hotel | | 1955 | Carlos B. Schoeppl | 4101 Collins Ave | Modern |
| Ocean Spray Hotel | | 1936 | Martin L. Hampton | 4130 Collins Ave | Art Deco |
| Clavelon Hotel | | 1936 | Martin L. Hampton | 4210 Collins Ave | Mediterranean Revival - Art Deco |
| San Marino Hotel | | 1950 | Roy France | 4299 Collins Ave | Modern |
| Empress Hotel | | 1952 | Melvin Grossman | 4333 Collins Ave | Modern |
| Tatem Hotel | | 1938 | Robert A. Taylor | 4343 Collins Ave | Art Deco |
| Barcelona Hotel Addition | | 1957 | Melvin Grossman | 4343 Collins Ave | Modern |
| Sovereign Hotel | | 1941 | Roy France | 4385 Collins Ave | Art Deco |
| Bikini Factory, Lum's | | 1950 | A.H. Mathes | 2300-10 Collins Ave | Modern |
| Lorraine Apartments | | 1953 | Henry Hohauser | 2601-11 Collins Ave | Modern |
| Coral Reef Hotel | | 1941 | J.J. DeBrita | 3601-11 Collins Ave | Classical Revival - Art Deco |
| Promenade Hotel | | 1948 | Albert Anis | 2469-77 Collins Ave | Modern |
| Chevy Chase | | 1936 | Kinports & Blohm | 2383 Flamingo Dr | Streamline |
| Sea-Jay Hotel | | 1937 | Albert Anis | 2420 Flamingo Dr | Art Deco |
| Lake Drive Apartments | | 1936 | L. Murray Dixon | 2440 Flamingo Dr | Art Deco |
| Flamingo Apartments | | 1940 | L. Murray Dixon | 2456-64 Flamingo Dr | Art Deco |
| Apartments | | 1941 | L. Murray Dixon | 2425 Flamingo Pl | Art Deco |
| Jefferson Davis | | 1935 | Roy France | 2444 Flamingo Pl | Art Deco |
| Haven Manor | | 1938 | David T. Ellis | 2449 Flamingo Pl | Mediterranean Revival - Art Deco |
| Palms Apartments | | 1936 | Roy France | 2460 Flamingo Pl | Art Deco |
| Residence | | 1932 | Russell Pancoast | 2701 Indian Creek Dr | Vernacular |
| Indian Creek Hotel | | 1936 | Pfeiffer & Pitt | 2731 Indian Creek Dr | Art Deco |
| Apartments | | 1962 | Gerard Pitt | 2901 Indian Creek Dr | Modern |
| Modern Hotel | | 1936 | Schoeppl & Southwell | 2911 Indian Creek Dr | Art Deco |
| Modern Apartments | | 1938 | Arnold Southwell | 2911 Indian Creek Dr (rear) | Streamline |
| Hotel Alden | | 1936 | Nadel & Nordin | 2925 Indian Creek Dr | Art Deco |
| Park Shore Apartments | | 1949 | Norman M. Giller | 3003 Indian Creek Dr | Modern |
| Grand Plaza Hotel | | 1935 | L. Murray Dixon | 3025 Indian Creek Dr | Art Deco |
| Greenbrier Hotel | | 1940 | L. Murray Dixon | 3101 Indian Creek Dr | Art Deco |
| Residence | | 1926 | Robertson & Patterson | 3127 Indian Creek Dr | Mediterranean Revival - Moorish |
| Churchill Apartments | | 1940 | Peterson & Wolz | 3801 Indian Creek Dr | Art Deco |
| Blue-J | | 1954 | Lester Avery | 4001 Indian Creek Dr | Modern |
| La Fleurette | | 1960 | T. Hunter Henderson | 4015 Indian Creek Dr | Modern |
| Archambo Hotel | | 1939 | Albert Anis | 4025 Indian Creek Dr | Streamline |
| Alamo Hotel | | 1938 | Roy France | 4121 Indian Creek Dr | Art Deco |
| Bahia Mar Apartments | | 1953 | Manfred Ungaro | 4201 Indian Creek Dr | Modern |
| Residence | | 1929 | Frank W. Woods | 4211 Indian Creek Dr | Vernacular |
| Residence | | 1932 | Carlos B. Schoeppl | 2801-11 Indian Creek Dr | Mediterranean Revival - Art Deco |
| Malabo Hotel | | 1947 | Alexander Lewis | 3831-65 Indian Creek Dr | Art Deco |
| Golden Gate | | 1947 | A.H. Mathes | 2395 Lake Pancoast Dr | Streamline |
| Mantell Plaza | | 1941 | Albert Anis | 2400 Lake Pancoast Dr | Art Deco |
| Helen Mar | | 1936 | Robert E. Collins | 2421 Lake Pancoast Dr | Art Deco |
| Pineview Apartments | | 1947 | Albert Anis | 2351 Pine Tree Dr | Modern |
| Colonnades | | 1946 | Albert Anis | 2365 Pine Tree Dr | Modern |
| Miami Beach Woman's Club | | 1933 | Russell Pancoast | 2401 Pine Tree Dr | Mediterranean Revival |
| Piccadilly Manor | | 1935 | Roy France | 2445 Pine Tree Dr | Streamline |
| Pines Apartments | | 1936 | Roy France | 2463 Pine Tree Dr | Art Deco |
| Helen Mar Annex | | 1956 | Gilbert M. Fein | 2445 Lake Pancoast Dr | Modern |
| Golden Arms | | 1940 | David T. Ellis | 320 25th St | Art Deco |
| Flamingo Terrace | | 1936 | L. Murray Dixon | 334 25th St | Art Deco |
| Silvia Apartments | | 1930 | Anthony Zink | 225 27th St | Mediterranean Revival - Beaux Arts |
| Vista del Mar | | 1929 | Frank Wyatt Woods | 222 28th St | Mediterranean Revival - Art Deco |
| Residence | | 1922 | | 230 28th St | Mediterranean Revival - Art Deco |
| Residence | | 1932 | C.B. Schoeppl | 241 28th St | Mediterranean Revival - Art Deco |
| Arlene Arms | | 1935 | H.O. Nelson | 215-25 30th St | Mediterranean Revival |
| Sutton Apartments | | 1957 | Gerard Pitt | 235 30th St | Modern |
| Bellamar Hotel | | 1939 | Roy France | 220 31st St | Art Deco |
| Former garage | | 1926 | G.L. McCann | 224 31st St | Mediterranean Revival - Mission |
| Apartments | | 1938 | Gordon E. Mayer | 230 31st St | Art Deco |
| Apartments | | 1957 | Gerard Pitt | 240 31st St | Modern |
| Residence | | 1929 | Anthony Zink | 222 36th St | Mediterranean Revival |
| Atlantic Shores | | 1936 | Schoeppl & Southwell | 229 36th St | Mediterranean Revival - Art Deco |
| Apartments | | 1947 | Carlos B. Schoeppl | 231 36th St | Modern |
| Ocean Grande Hotel | | 1939 | Roy France | 100 37th St | Art Deco |
| Synagogue | | 1928 | S.J. Hale | 225 37th St | Mediterranean Revival |
| Residence | | 1924 | Liebenberg & Kaplin | 237 38th St | Mediterranean Revival - Mission |
| Heether Arms | | 1939 | T. Hunter Henderson | 227 39th St | Classical Revival - Art Deco |
| Residence | | 1931 | C.L. Kinports | 228 40th St | Mediterranean Revival - Baroque |
| Pierre Hotel | | 1937 | Martin L. Hampton | 216 43rd St | Streamline |
