= National Hotel (Miami Beach, Florida) =

Miami Beach hotel

The National Hotel
- Interactive map of The National Hotel

General information
- Location: 1677 Collins Avenue, Miami Beach, Florida
- Coordinates: 25.7919°N 80.1294°W
- Completed: 1939; 87 years ago

The National Hotel (also known as The National Hotel or National Hotel Miami Beach) is an Art Deco-style hotel on Collins Avenue in the South Beach area of Miami Beach, Florida. It is a member of the Historic Hotels of America program of the National Trust for Historic Preservation. It is 14 stories tall and is topped with a cupola painted silver.

It was designed by American architect Roy France, who is credited for creating Miami Beach's skyline, having designed many of its hotels, in Art Deco and in Postwar Modern styles. His philosophy regarding the National Hotel and others was: "Let in the air and sun. That's what people come to Florida for."

Originally built in 1939, it was fully renovated in 2014. During the COVID-19 pandemic, the hotel "closed for nearly a year to redo the 116 rooms and suites in the Historic Tower and 36 Cabana units".

Shayne Benowitz of the Daily Telegraph gave the hotel an 8 out of 10 rating, saying:

The National Hotel is one of Miami’s legacy oceanfront Art Deco hotels on Collins Avenue, with an iconic 205-foot-long swimming pool, vintage travel-themed rooms and original mosaic tile murals by Jazz Age artist Tamara de Lempicka.

The front is its Art Deco tower. Behind, the Mareva 1939 restaurant looks out onto the long narrow "infinity" pool running away towards the beach, sided by cabanas, pool-side tables, and a lower section of the hotel extending. Then there is a rectangular, nearly square, leisure pool, then the tiki bars and lounge areas, then scrub and trees with the Miami Beach Boardwalk, then the beach. The tower has sized the same as when originally built; the lower section of the hotel has larger rooms.

Nonguests can use the two pools for a fee ($45 in 2022).

Benowitz writes:

There are some limitations that come with restoring a historic hotel in a city where preservation is paramount. For this reason, rooms are snug and windows are small because they retain their original blueprint. The National makes the most of this in updated furnishings with rich cherry polished wood headboards, desks, chairs and cocktail tables. Polished chrome is used for bedside lamps and overhead fans, adding to the clean, vintage appeal. Bathrooms are also rather tight, yet modern and clean with a trough sink, white subway tiles and a bathtub-shower combo. The upgraded cabana rooms are more spacious and luxurious.

In 2021, Armin Rosen of Tablet asserted that there was a "new diaspora", partly coming to Miami Beach, of "disgruntled New Yorkers, fleeing the city’s draconian COVID restrictions and pessimistic politics." He cited the National Hotel's hosting of "swanky" parties as one indicator of Miami Beach reopening up, in advance of New York City, in April and May.

A 2021 tribute gala to Josephine Baker at the National Hotel sold out. Miami declared November 28, 2021 to be "Josephine Baker Day", in honor of the American-French singer, who had performed in Miami Beach, and the tribute event was held at the National. In 1950/1951, it is said, she made history by refusing to perform at the Copa City Club unless the Miami Beach club was open to blacks. At this time Jim Crow segregation rules were in effect. The club denied her demand, but eventually relented, and on January 10, 1951, she "became the first known entertainer to perform at a prominent Miami Beach club before an integrated audience."

The Montreal Gazette states in 2022 that the National "recently wrapped up renovations to its guest rooms and has adopted an adults-only policy" which, at this hotel, requires guests to be 21 or older.

In 2022 Architectural Digest called the National an "architectural gem", and one of "eight iconic buildings throughout the city that have been renovated to showcase their historic value through a 21st-century lens." It mentioned the full restoration of the hotel in 2021 and that:

[The] adults-only Art Deco hotel launched its most recent restaurant, Marea 1939, named for the historic year in which the hotel was built. The indoor-outdoor dining spaces at Marea 1939 offer a garden, pool, and ocean views, anchored with U-shaped banquettes in classic Miami style. The bar 1939 overlooks The National's grand Art Deco lobby.
