= Casa Faena =

Historic hotel in Miami Beach, Florida

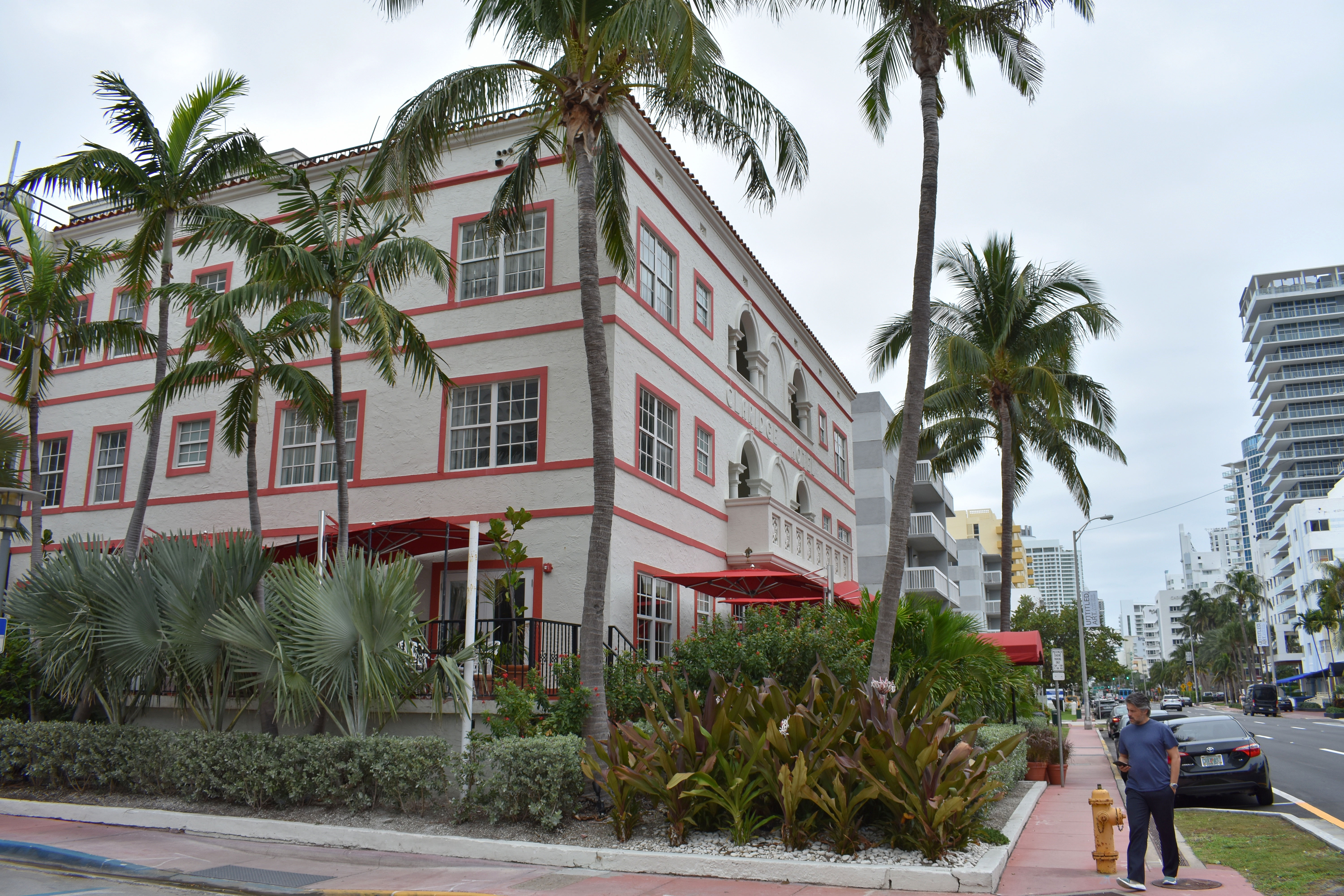
- Photo in 2018

- Location within Florida

General information
- Location: 3500 Collins Ave., Miami Beach, Florida
- Coordinates: 25.809234°N 80.123862°W
- Completed: 1928

Casa Faena, on Collins Avenue in Miami Beach, Florida, is a hotel built in 1928. It was designed by prolific local architect Martin L. Hampton, who also designed Miami Beach City Hall and who "was a master of the Mediterranean Revival style". It was opened as an apartment building named El Paraiso Apartments, originally with two hotel rooms and 18 apartment units.

The property was leased by the U.S. Army Air Force during World War II.

It is listed on the National Register of Historic Places as a Mediterranean Revival-style contributing building in the Collins Waterfront Architectural District, with indication that it was completed in 1930. Other buildings designed by Hampton in the district include the La Corona Apartments (1923) at 2814 Collins Avenue, Hampton Court (1924), and the Embassy Hotel (1935) at 2940 Collins Avenue.

The hotel now has 50 guest rooms and suites. It has been listed by the National Trust for Historic Preservation as a member of the Historic Hotels of America since 2015.

== See also ==
- Faena Hotel Miami Beach, 3201 Collins Avenue
