= Victor Nellenbogen =

American architect

- Born: Victor Nellenbogen; 1 May 1888; Budapest, Austria-Hungary
- Died: 15 November 1959; Miami Beach, Florida, United States
- Occupation: Architect

Victor Hugo Nellenbogen (1 May 1888 – 15 November 1959) was a Hungarian-American architect known for his Art Deco and Mediterranean Revival designs in Miami Beach during the first half of the 20th century. His notable buildings include the Savoy Plaza Hotel on Ocean Drive, the Lord Tarleton Hotel on 40th and 41st Streets, and the Sterling Building on Lincoln Road.

Three renovations of his historic buildings have won the Barbara Baer Capitman Award, given by the Miami Design Preservation League for the "Best of the Best" in architectural historic restorations in Miami Beach.

== Notable Miami Beach buildings ==
- Alamac Apartments (1934)
- Savoy Plaza Hotel (1935)
- Chelsea Hotel (1936)
- 658 NE 73rd Street Residence (1936)
- 7337 Harding Apartments (1937)
- Lord Tarleton Hotel (1940)
- Moderne Olsen Hotel (1941)
- Sterling Building (1941)

== See also ==
- Art Deco
- Miami Beach Architectural District
