= Hillcrest Apartment =

- U.S. National Register of Historic Places
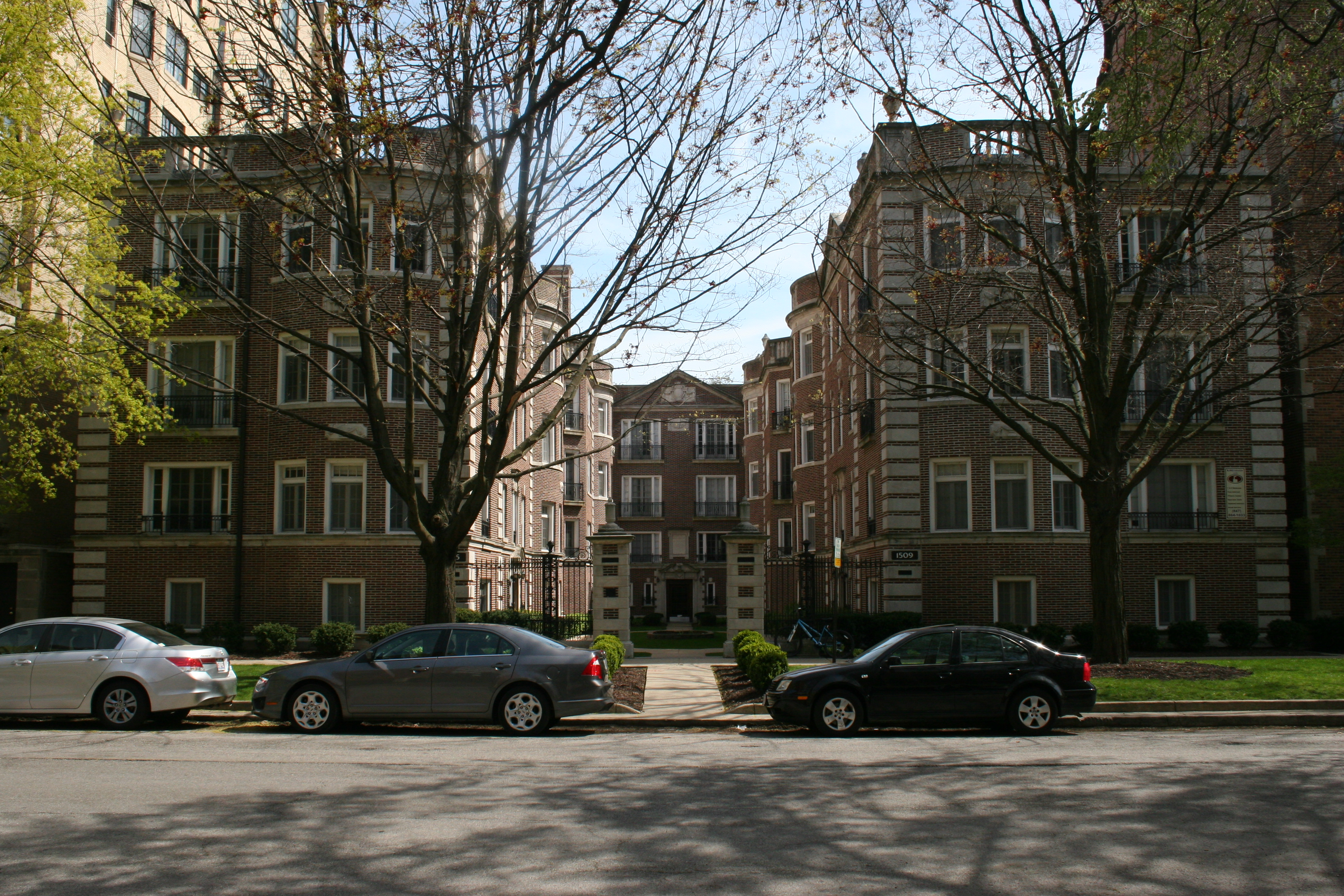
- Hillcrest Apartments in 2012

- Location within Chicago metropolitan area Location within Illinois Location within the United States
- Location: 1509-1515 Hinman Ave., Evanston, Illinois
- Coordinates: 42°02′42″N 87°40′41″W
- Area: 0.4 acres (0.16 ha)
- Built: 1922
- Architect: Roy F. France
- Architectural style: Georgian Revival
- MPS: Suburban Apartment Buildings in Evanston TR
- NRHP reference No.: 84000994
- Added to NRHP: March 15, 1984

Hillcrest Apartment is a historic apartment building at 1509-1515 Hinman Avenue in Evanston, Illinois. Built in 1922, the three-story brick building has a U-shaped plan with a central courtyard, a common layout for suburban apartment buildings. The courtyard is fenced and gated on its open side, providing privacy despite the building's downtown location. Architect Roy F. France designed the building in the Georgian Revival style. The building's design includes limestone trim meant to approximate quoins, a balustrade with ornamental urns, and pediments atop the entrance blocks.

The building was added to the National Register of Historic Places on March 15, 1984.
