= State Theatre (Plant City, Florida) =

Coordinates: 28.01493°N 82.12353°W

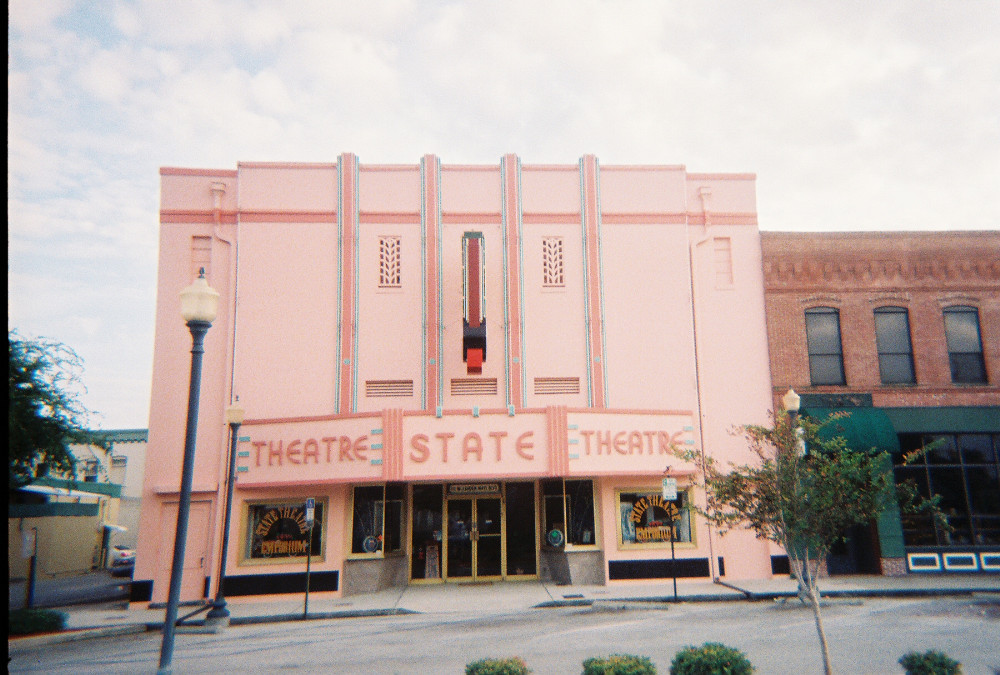
State Theatre in Plant City, Florida

State Theatre is a historic theater building in Plant City, Florida. It is located at 111 W. J. Arden Mays Boulevard. The theater opened in 1939, closed in the 1950s and was then used as an antique and collectibles store (State Theatre Antiques). The pink building with blue trim is an example of art deco architecture.
