= John & Florence McKeage House =

- U.S. National Register of Historic Places
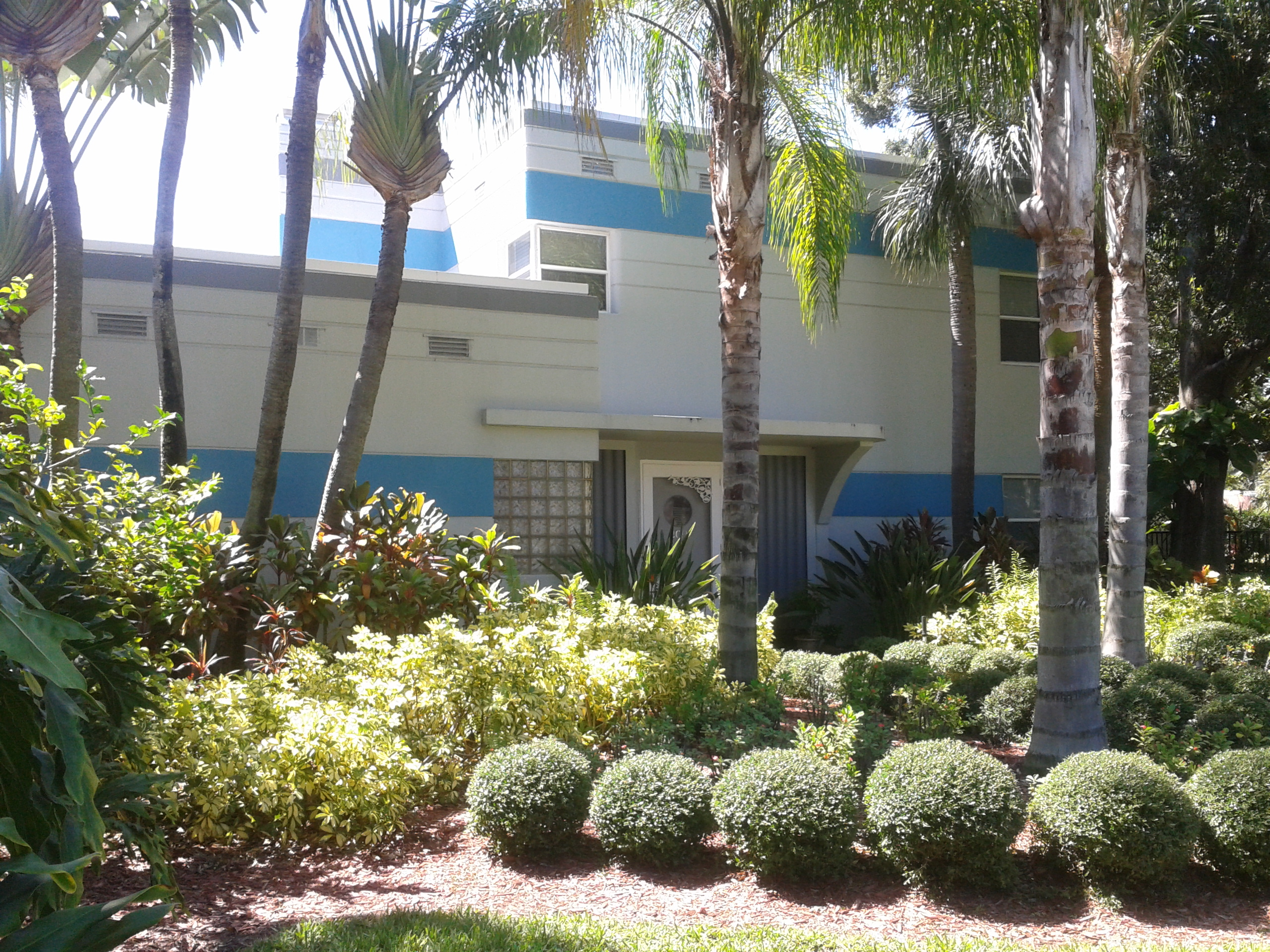

- Location within Florida Location within the United States
- Location: St. Petersburg, Florida
- Coordinates: 27°46′54″N 82°39′04″W
- NRHP reference No.: 13000145
- Added to NRHP: April 9, 2013

John & Florence McKeage House is a national historic site located at 209 Park Street South, St. Petersburg, Florida in Pinellas County. It is an Art Moderne style house constructed in 1938.

It was added to the National Register of Historic Places on April 9, 2013.
