= Cadillac Hotel & Beach Club =

- U.S. National Register of Historic Places
- U.S. Historic district – Contributing property
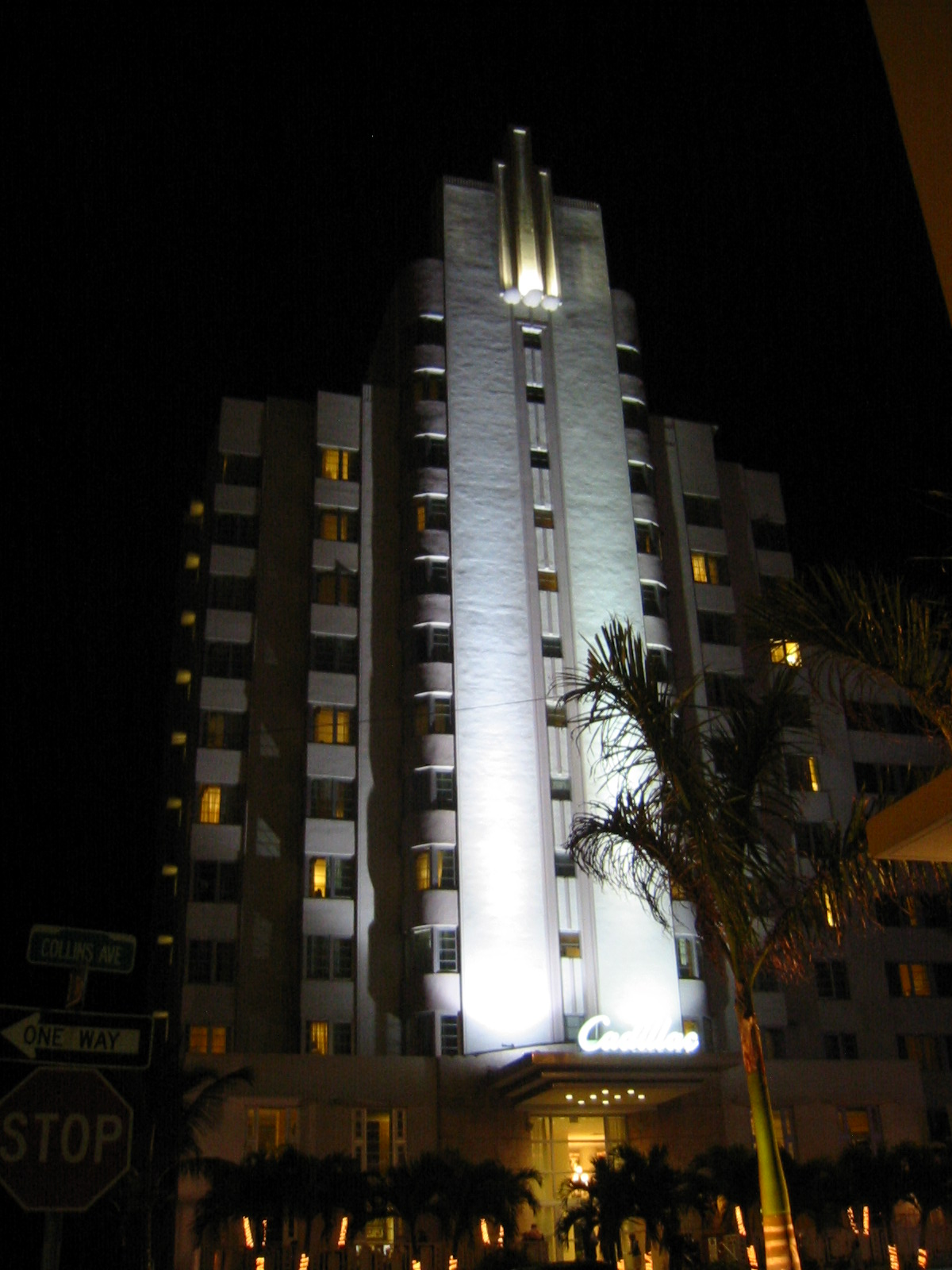
- The Cadillac Hotel at night.

- Location within Florida
- Location: Miami Beach, Florida United States
- Coordinates: 25°48′43″N 80°7′23″W
- Area: 1.5 acres (0.61 ha)
- Built: 1940
- Built by: P.J. Davis Construction Co.
- Architect: Roy France (original); Melvin Grossman
- Architectural style: Art Deco, Moderne
- Part of: Collins Waterfront Architectural District (ID11000905)
- NRHP reference No.: 05001117

Significant dates
- Added to NRHP: October 5, 2005
- Designated CP: November 15, 2011

The Cadillac Hotel & Beach Club is a historic U.S. hotel in Miami Beach, Florida. It is located at 3925 Collins Avenue. On October 5, 2005, it was added to the U.S. National Register of Historic Places (NRHP).

It was designed by architect Roy France. A 1956 addition was designed by Melvin Grossman. It is also a contributing building in the NRHP-listed Collins Waterfront Architectural District.

It has been used as a hotel except for three years from 1942 to 1945 when it was leased by the United States military.

It is built of concrete block with a stucco finish, atop a wood piling and concrete slab foundation.

The hotel was part of Courtyard by Marriott for a number of years and was named Courtyard Cadillac Miami Beach/Oceanfront. It closed in September 2017 for major renovations by its owners, Hersha Hospitality Trust and reopened in August 2018 as an Autograph Collection by Marriott hotel, with 357 guest rooms, two pools, meeting spaces, a bar and restaurants.

== Gallery ==
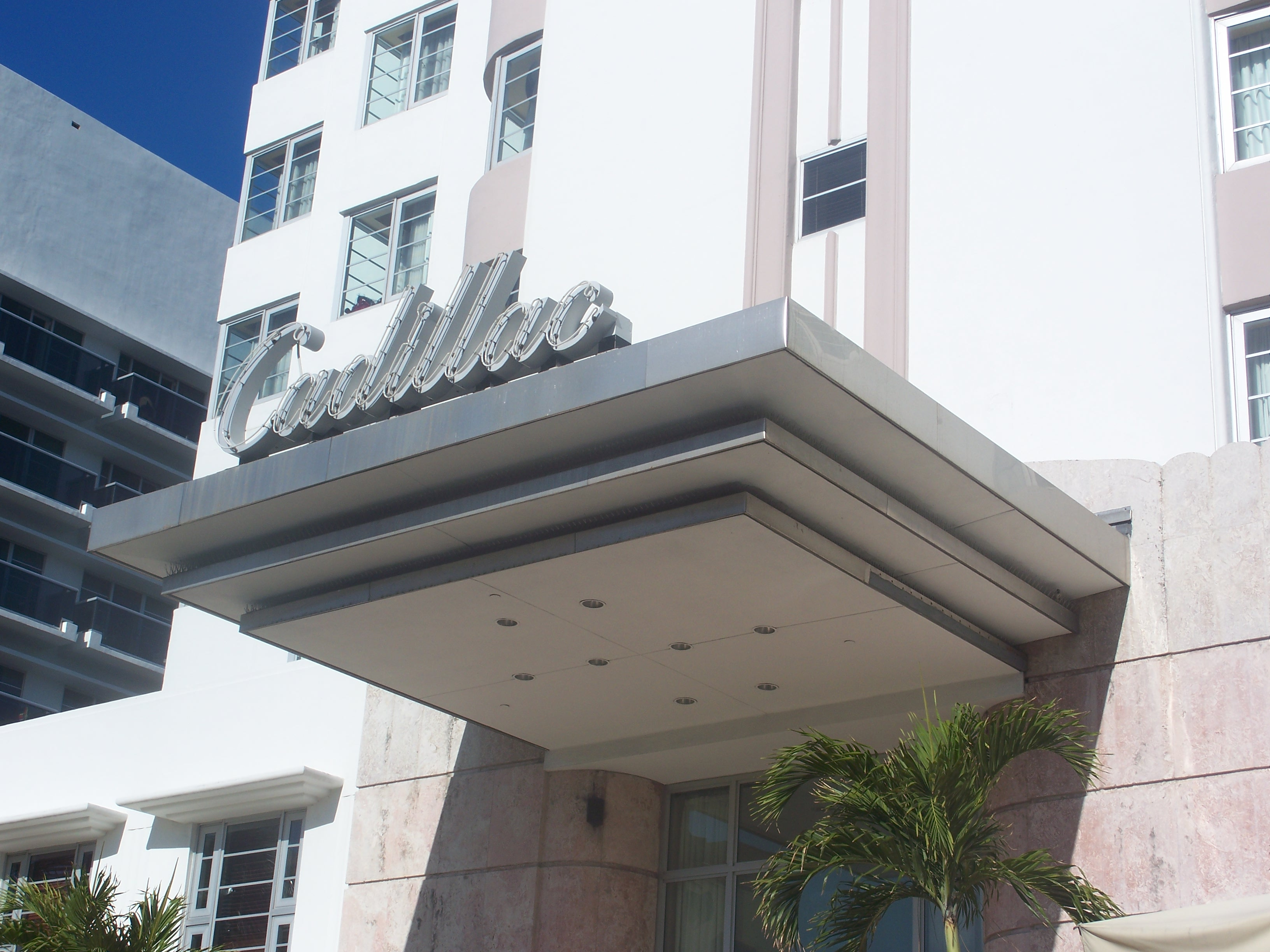

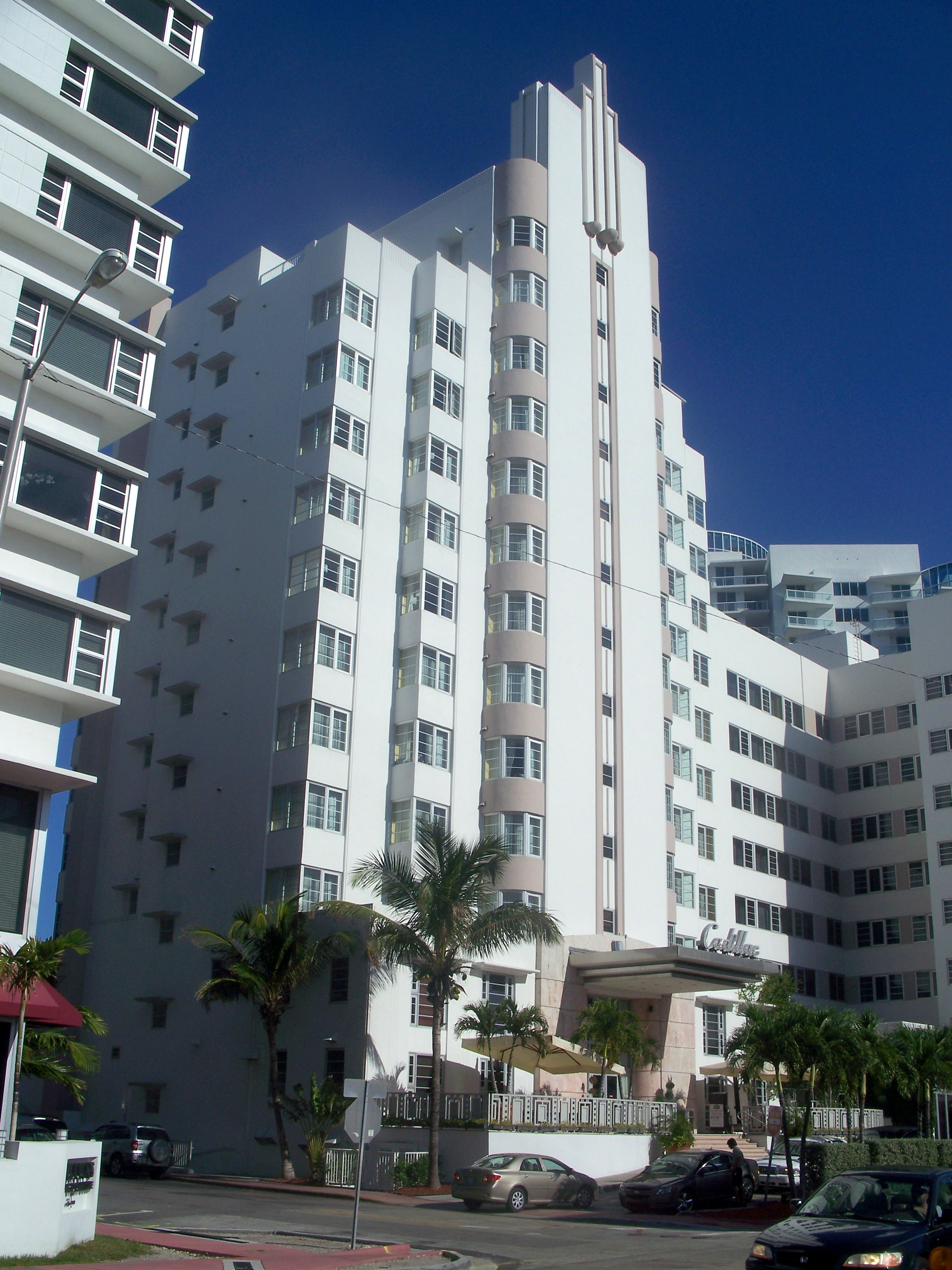

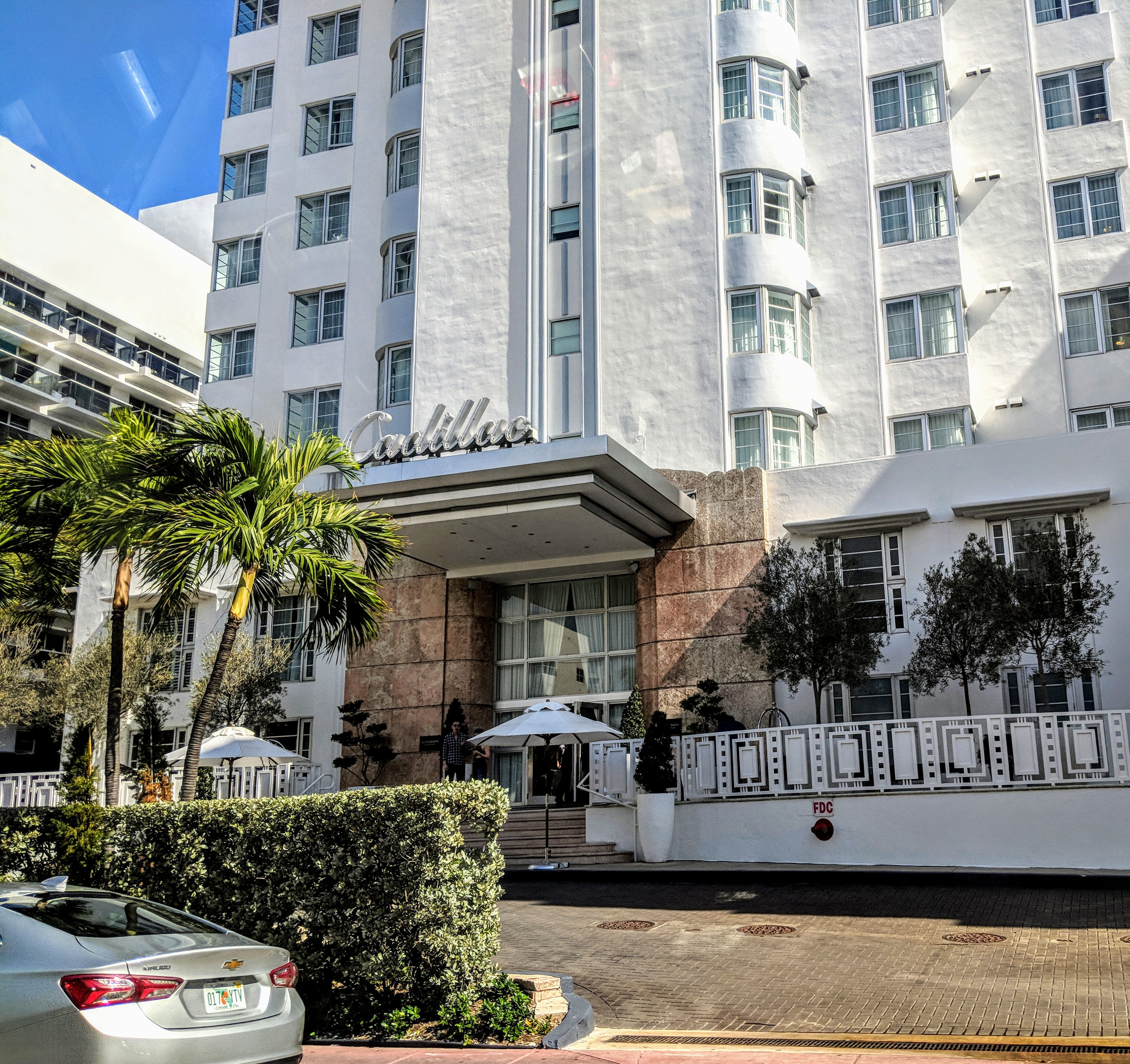

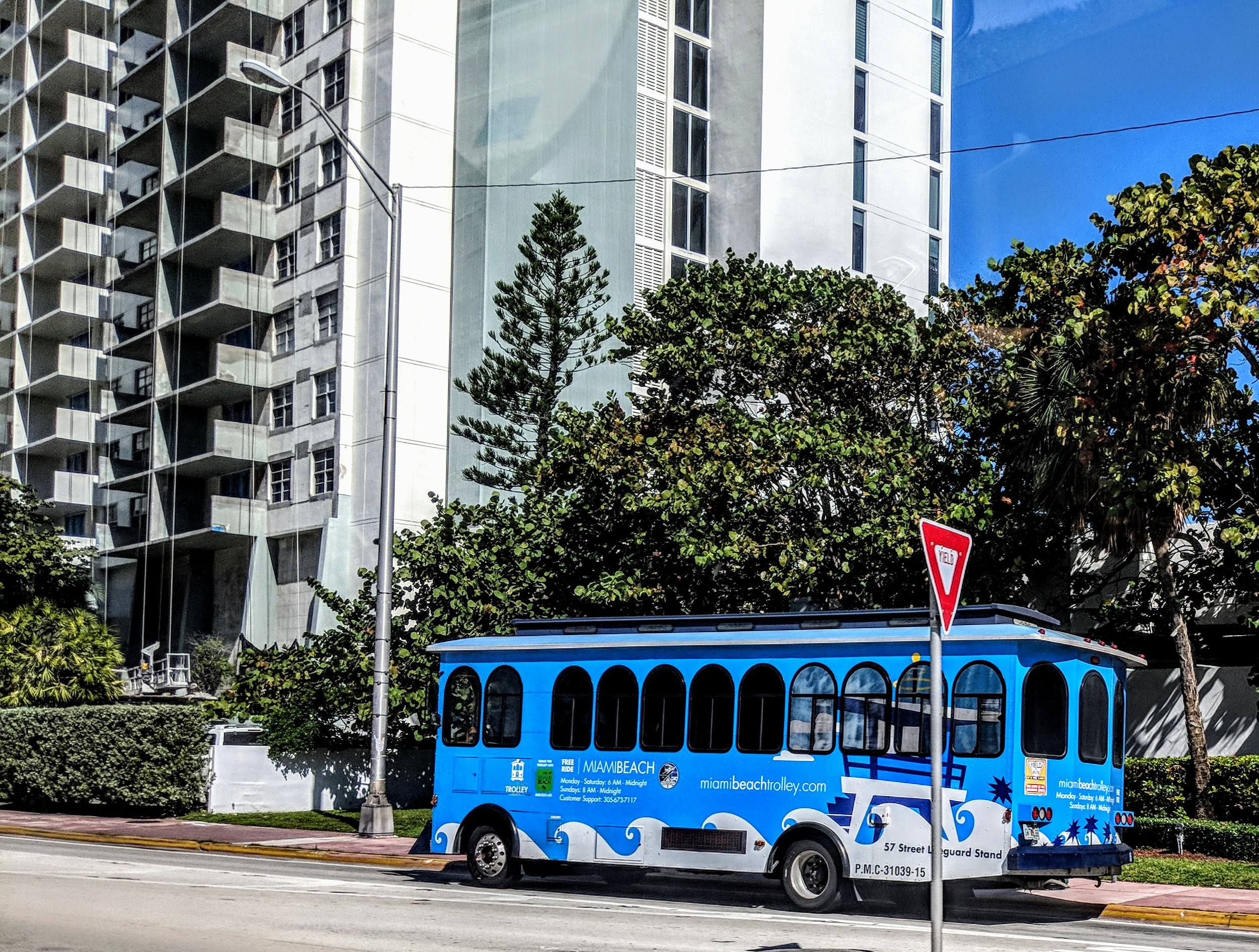
Miami Beach Trolley
