= Clinton Hotel Miami Beach =

Hotel in Miami Beach, Florida, US

New Clinton Hotel
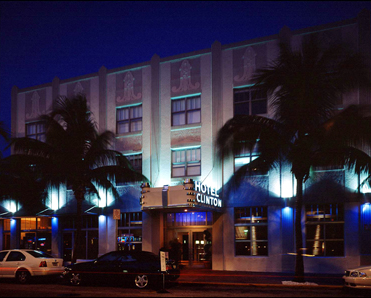
- Interactive map of the New Clinton Hotel area

General information
- Location: Miami Beach, Florida, USA
- Coordinates: 25°49′05″N 80°07′23″W

Design and construction
- Architect: Charles Neidler

Clinton Hotel Miami Beach or The New Clinton Hotel And Spa is an Art Deco hotel located in Miami Beach, Florida.

== History and Renovation ==
Clinton Hotel Miami Beach was originally built in 1934 by architect Charles Neidler. The Clinton Hotel was renovated in 2004 by designer Eric Raffy. The total cost of the renovation was $12 million. The New Clinton Hotel and Spa is in the heart of Miami's South Beach.

== Sources ==
- Travel, The Palm Beach Post Sunday
- Hotel Business
