= Albert Anis =

American architect (1889–1964)

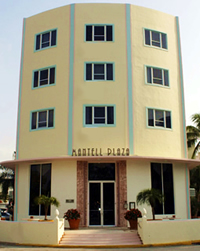
The Mantell Plaza - Miami Beach

Albert Anis (April 18, 1889 – August 28, 1964) was an architect in Miami, Florida known for his Art Deco architecture. He was one of a group of American-born architects working in Miami Beach who synthesized the austere architectural principles of the International Style architecture with their own brand of modernism which embraced the ornamentation and exotic lure of the tropical.

== Career ==
Anis was the architect for a number of outstanding Art Deco-style buildings in Chicago in the 1920s, and hotels on Ocean Drive, in Miami Beach. Among his most noted works are:

- The Whitelaw Hotel (1936) 808 Collins Avenue, Miami Beach FL
- Waldorf Towers Hotel (1937), Ocean Drive, Miami Beach FL
- The Winterhaven Hotel (1937)
- The Leslie Hotel (1937), Ocean Drive, Miami Beach FL
- The Chesterfield Hotel, formally called Helmor Hotel (1938) 855 Collins Avenue, Miami Beach FL
- The Traymore Hotel (1939) 2445 Collins Avenue
- Clevelander Hotel (1939), Ocean Drive, Miami Beach FL
- The Abbey Hotel (1940)
- Majestic Hotel (1940), Ocean Drive, Miami Beach FL
- The Tyler Apartment Hotel (1940), 430 21st St, Miami Beach Fl
- Berkeley Shore Hotel (1940), 1610 Collins Avenue, Miami Beach FL
- The Viscay Hotel (1941)
- Avalon Hotel (1941), Ocean Drive, Miami Beach FL
- The Mantell Plaza (1942)
- Colonade Apartments (1946) 2365 Pinetree Drive, Miami Beach FL currently called Tradewinds Apartment Hotel
- Pineview Apartments (1947) 2351 Pinetree Drive, Miami Beach FL currently called Tradewinds Apartment Hotel
- Temple Emanuel (1947)
- Lord Charles Apartments (1953) 4?? 21st St, Miami Beach, FL
- Bhojwani Tower (1950s)

=== Gallery ===
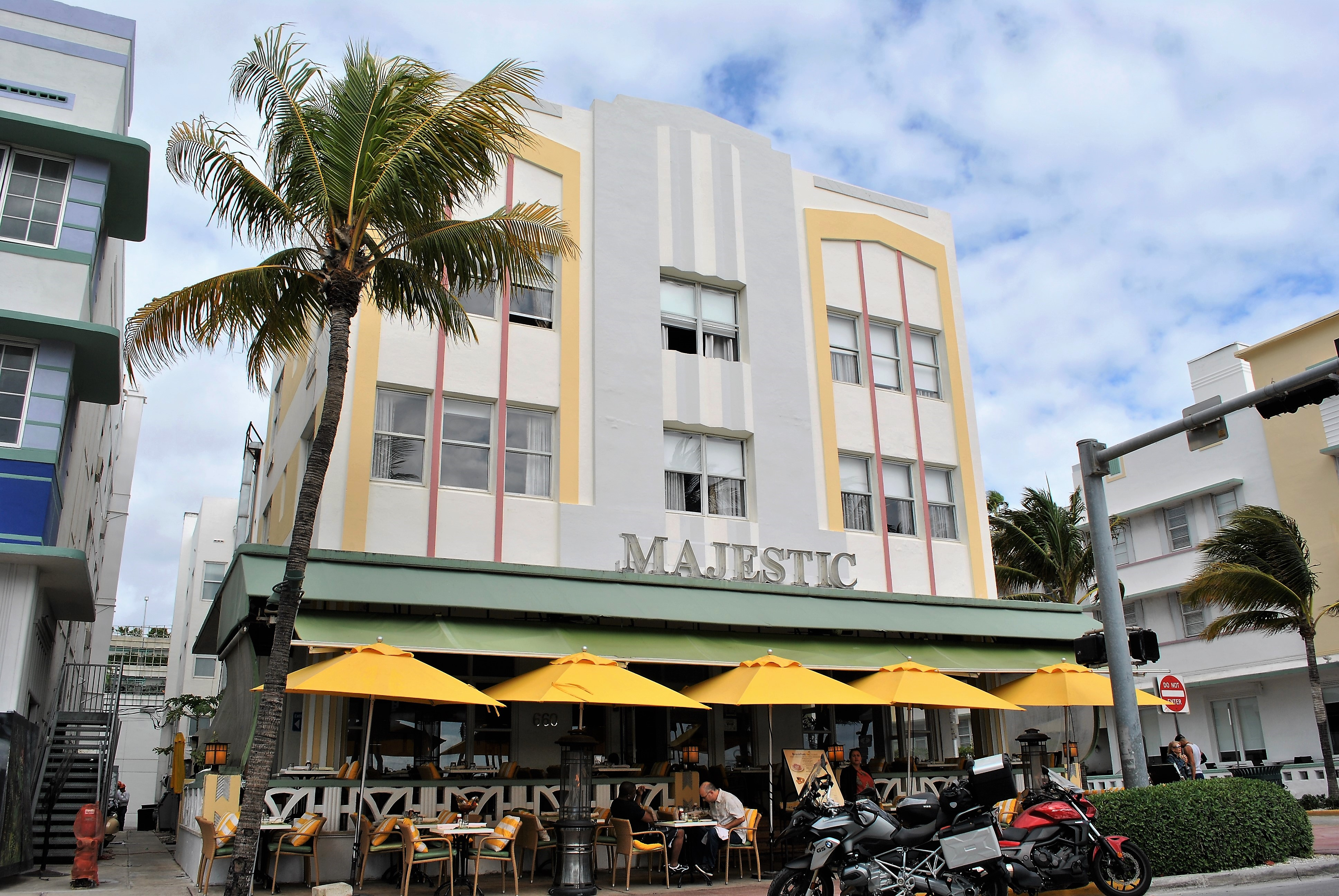
Majestic (Albert Anis, 1940)

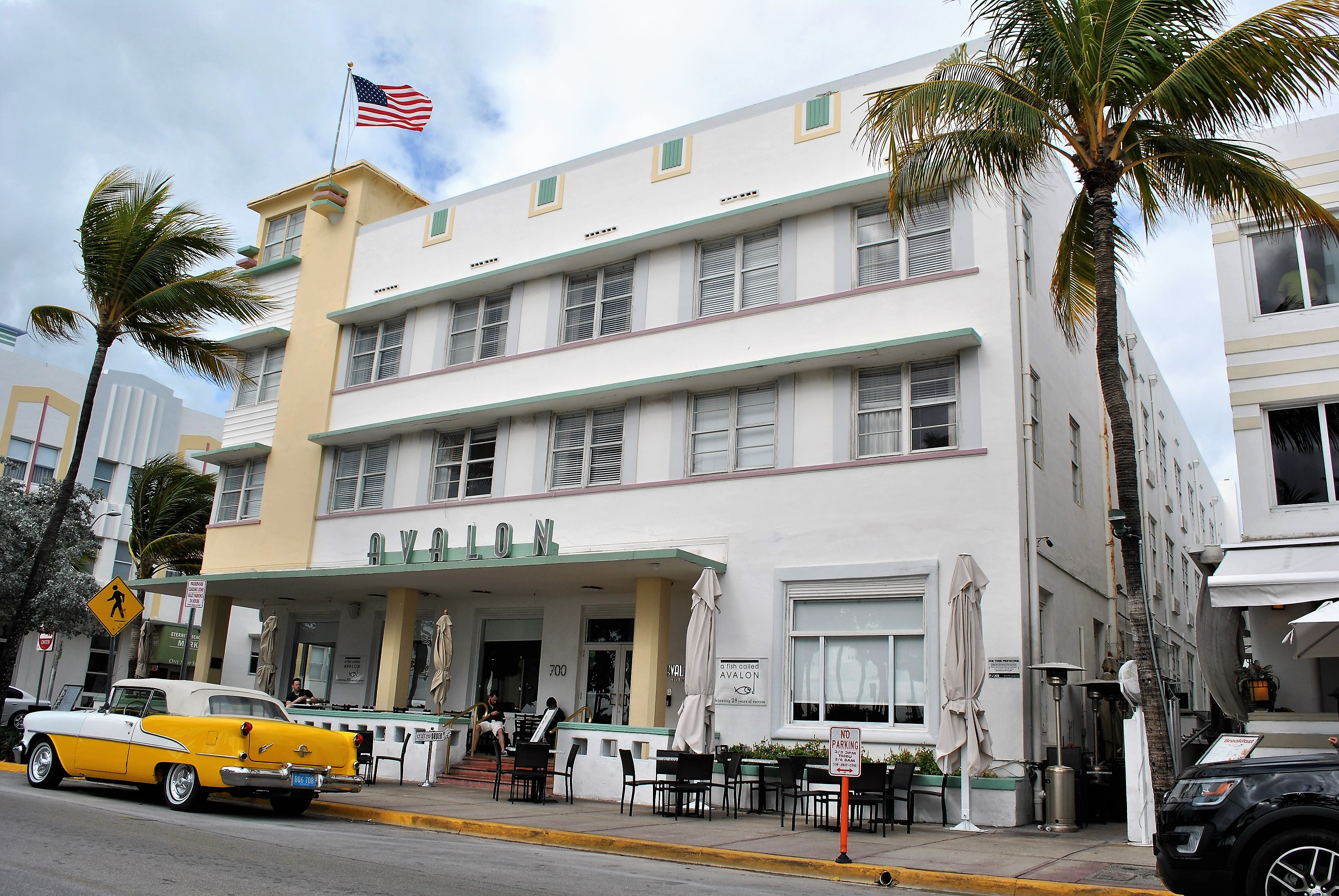
Avalon (Albert Anis, 1941)

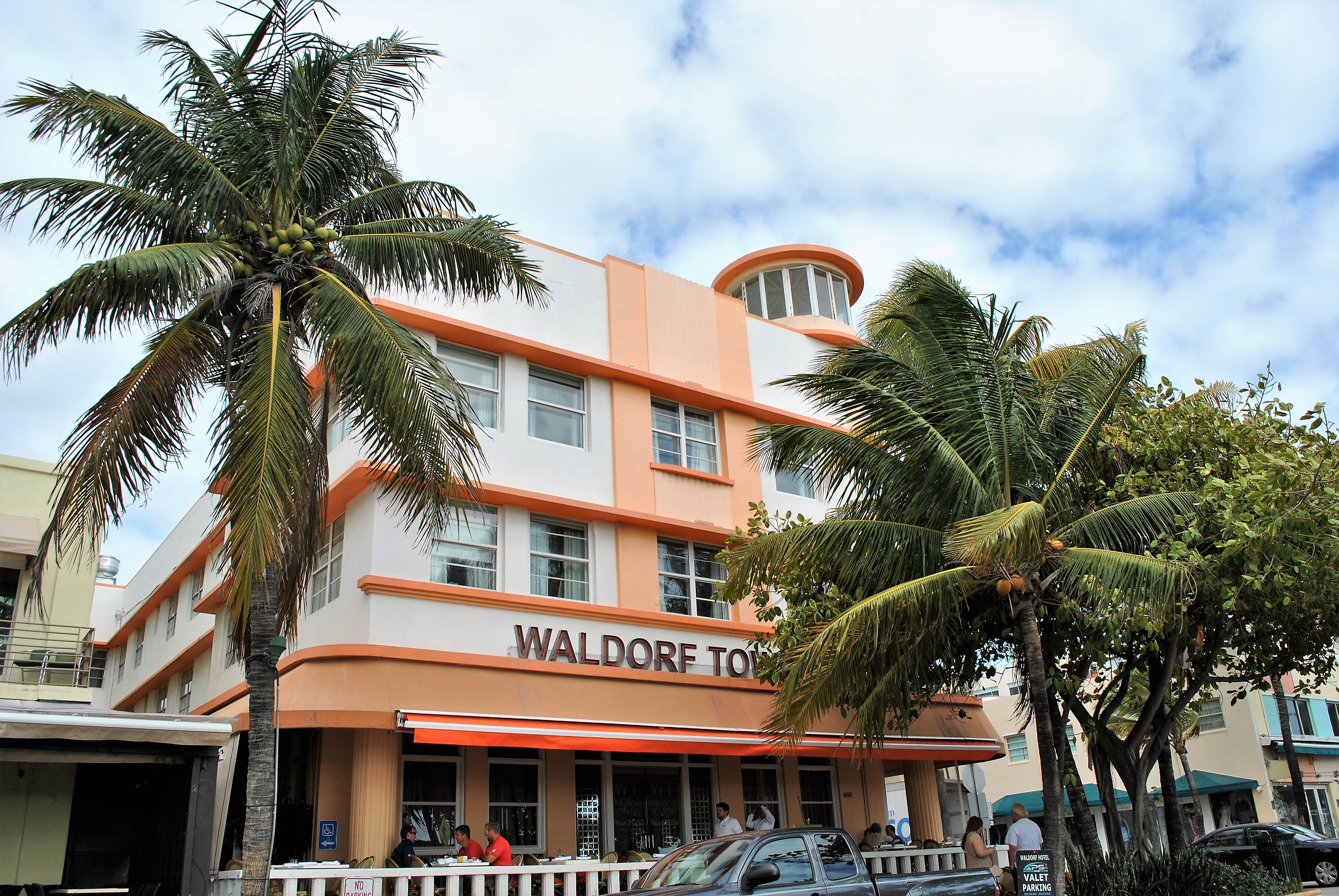
Waldorf Towers (Albert Anis, 1937)

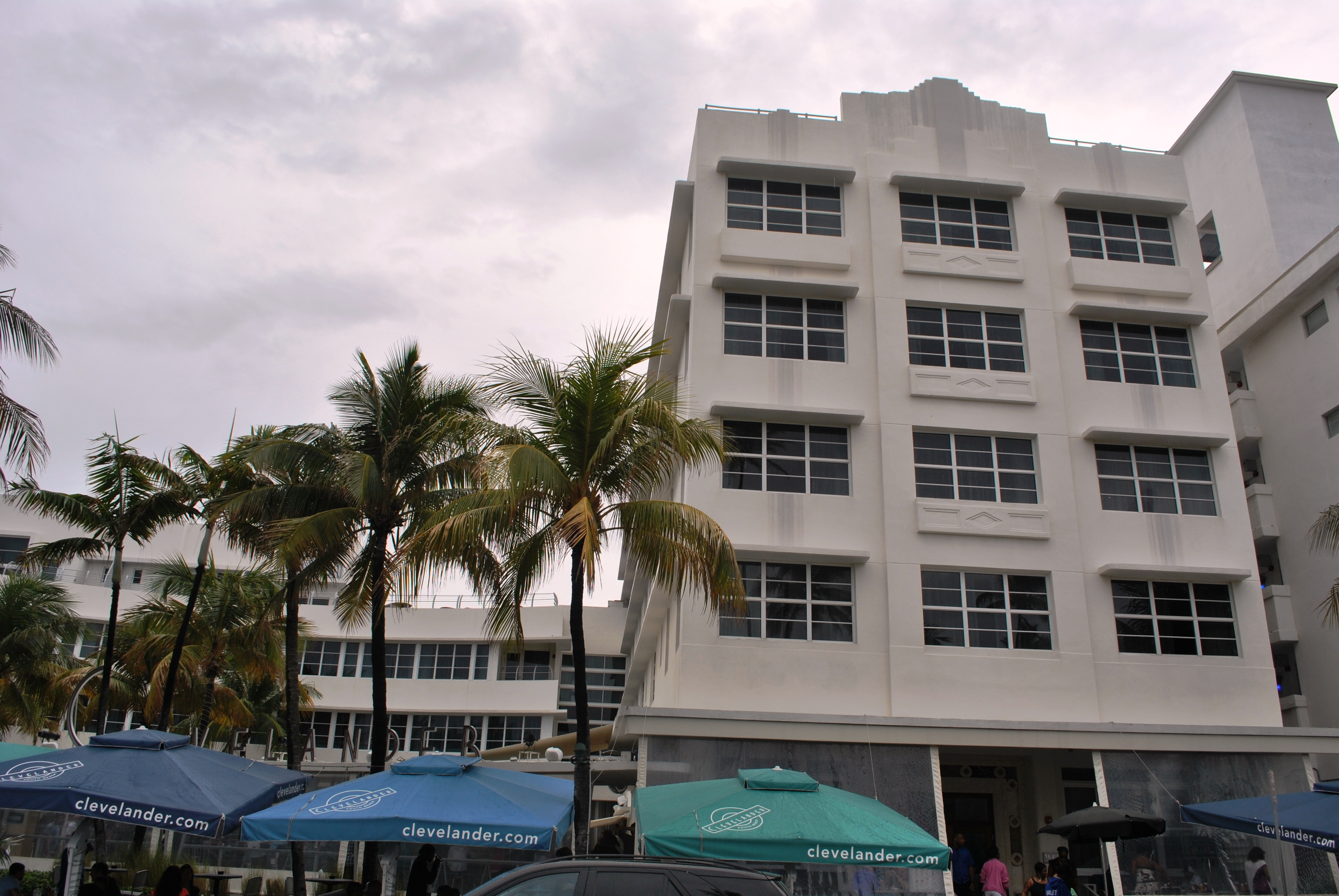
Clevelander (Albert Anis, 1939)

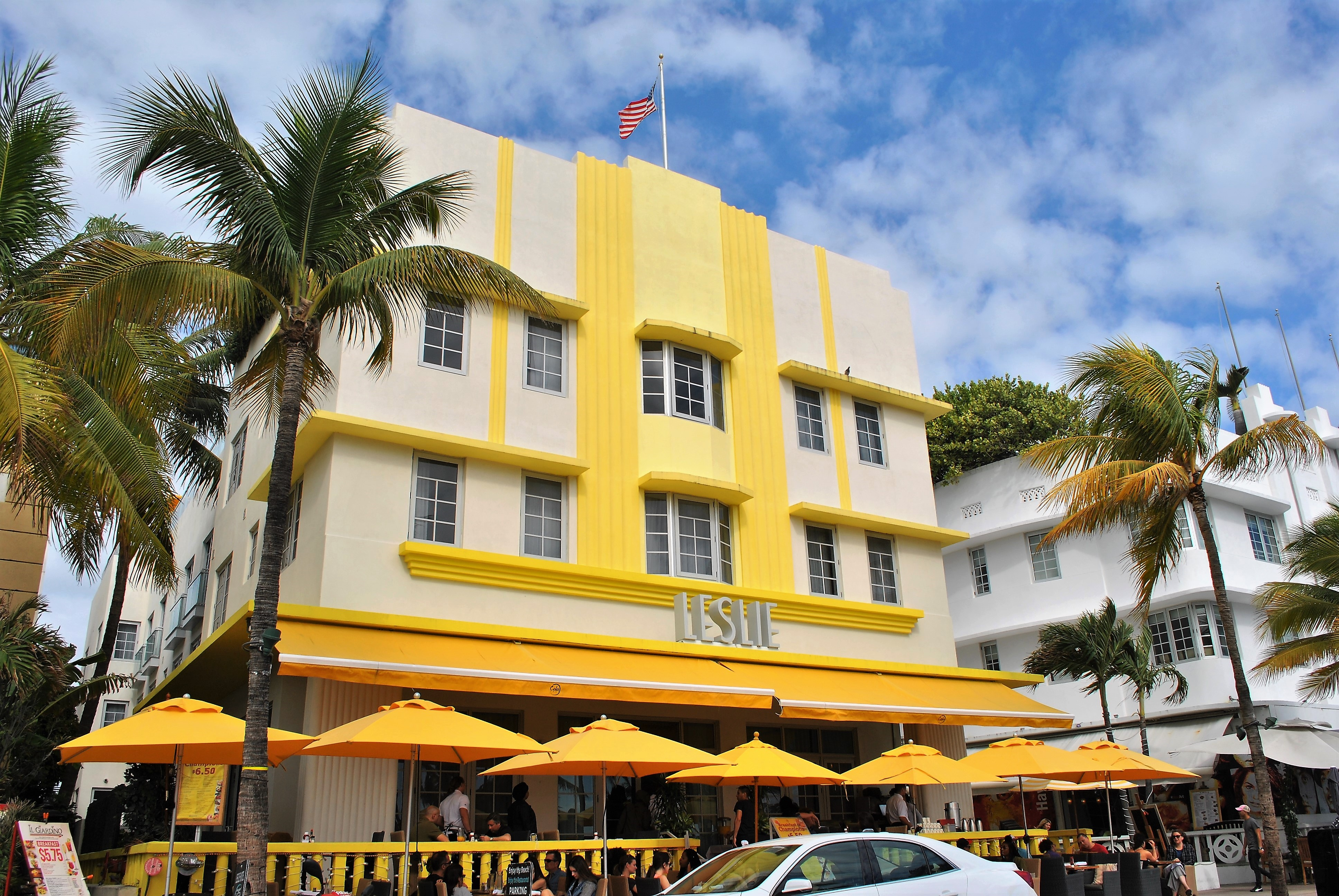
Leslie (Albert Anis, 1937)

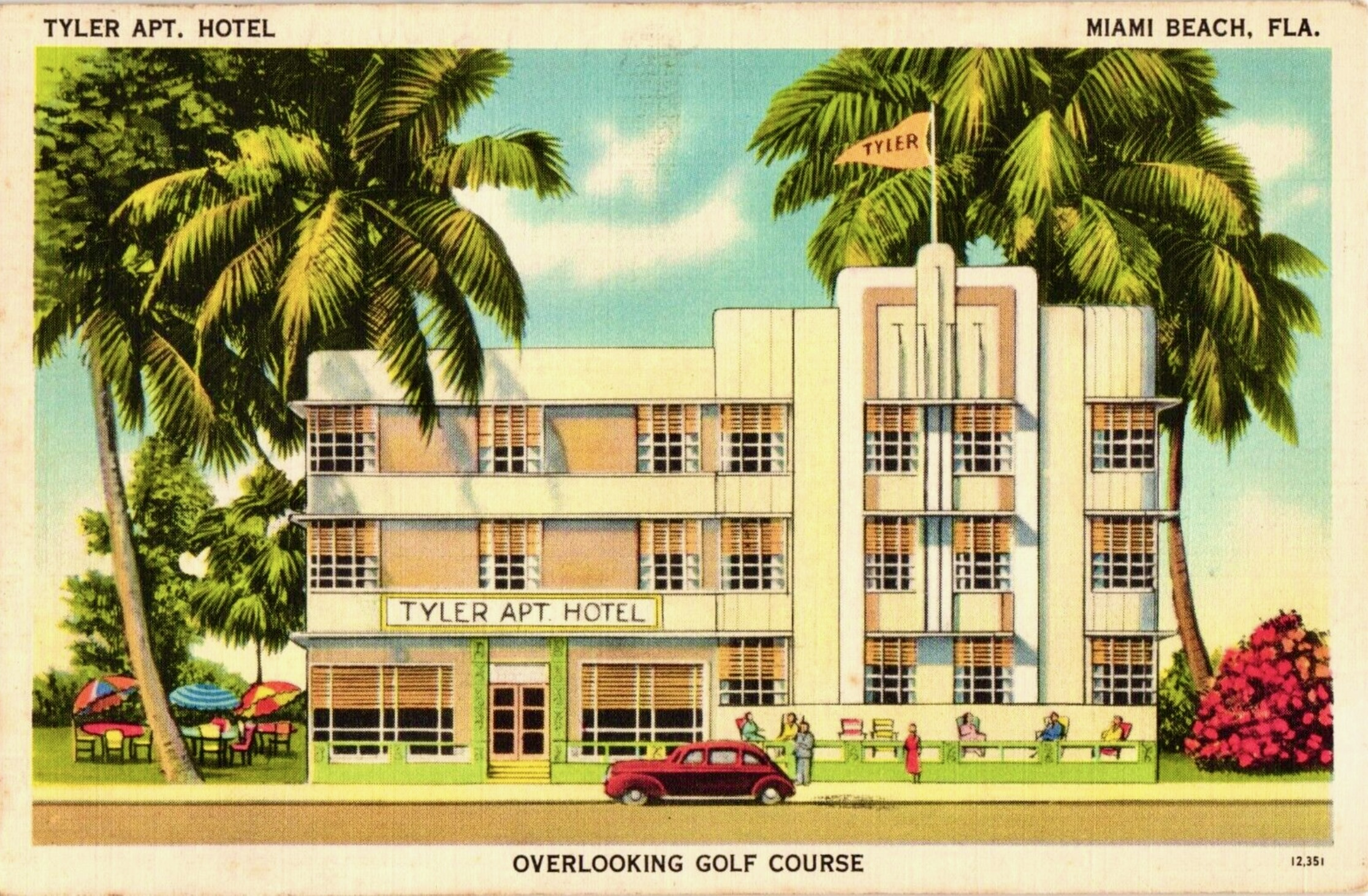
Tyler Apartment Hotel (1940) 430 21st St, Miami Beach
