= Woman's Club of Ocoee =

- U.S. National Register of Historic Places
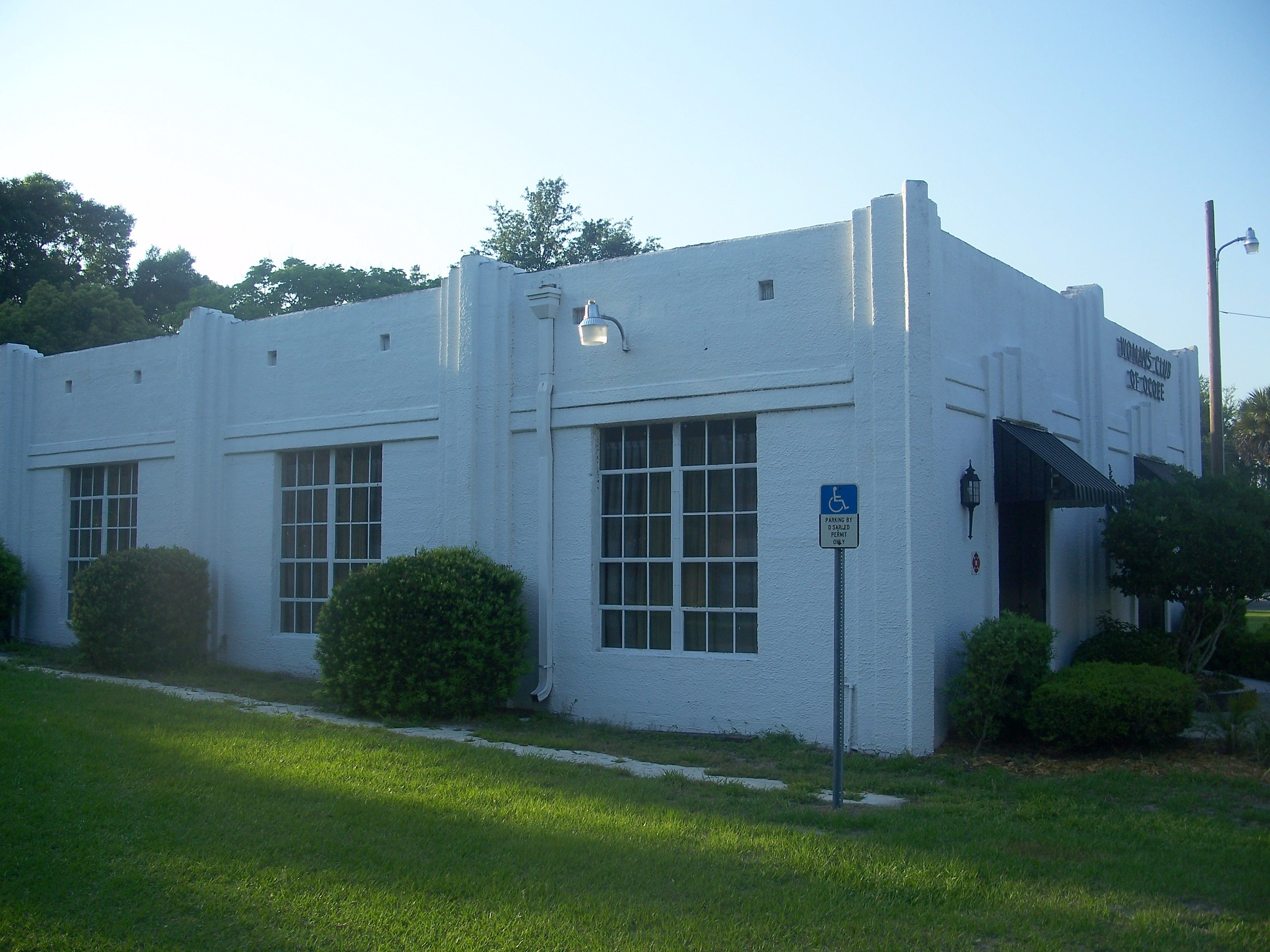

- Location within Florida Location within the United States
- Location: Ocoee, Florida
- Coordinates: 28°34′11″N 81°32′33″W
- Built: 1938
- Architect: Murry S. King, James B. King
- Architectural style: Moderne
- NRHP reference No.: 11000002
- Added to NRHP: February 14, 2011

Woman's Club of Ocoee is a national historic site located at 10 North Lakewood Avenue, Ocoee, Florida in Orange County.

It was added to the National Register of Historic Places in 2011.
