= Lake Shore Apartments =

- U.S. National Register of Historic Places
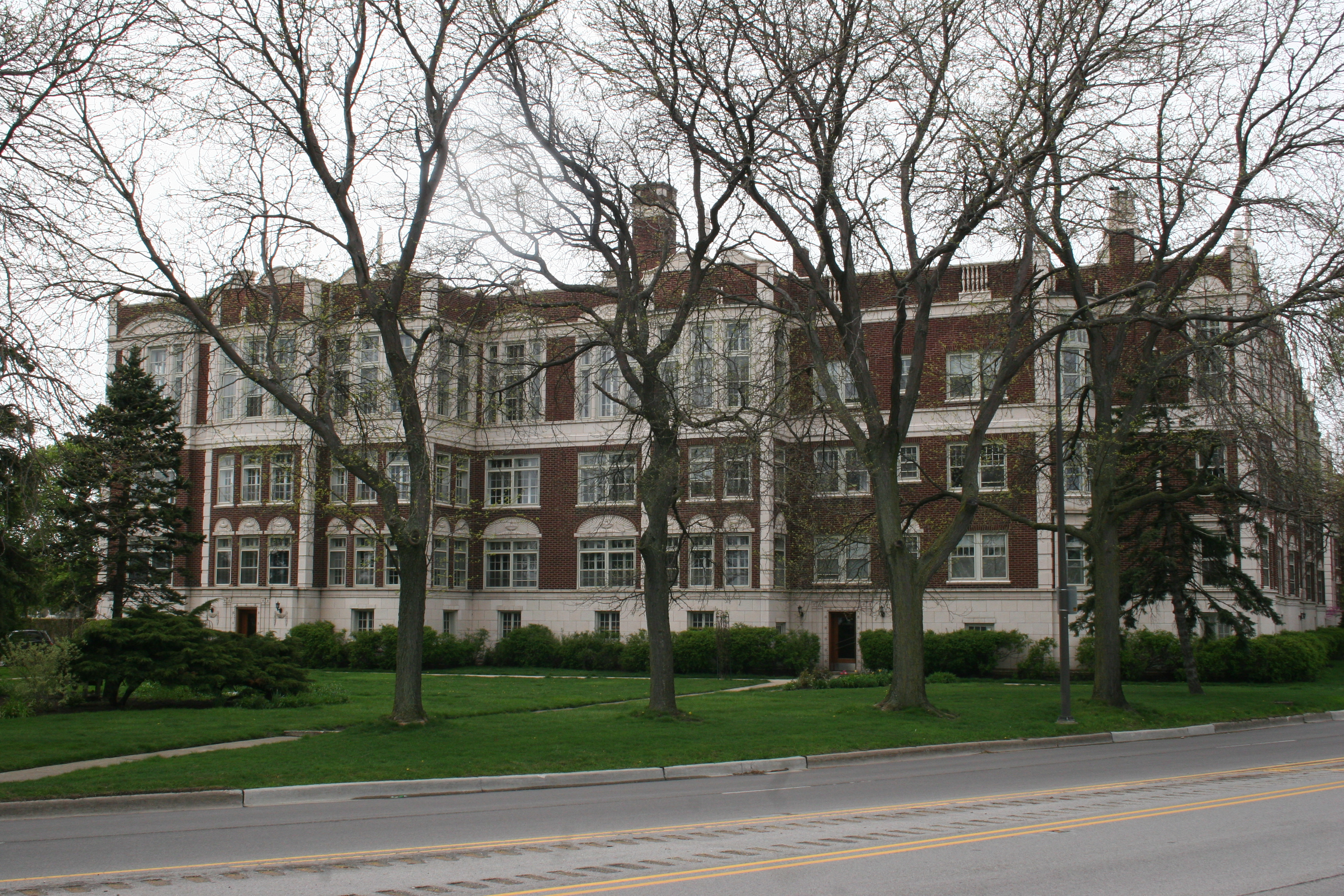
- Lake Shore Apartments in 2012

- Location within Chicago metropolitan area Location within Illinois Location within the United States
- Location: 470-498 Sheridan Rd., Evanston, Illinois
- Coordinates: 42°01′37″N 87°40′07″W
- Area: less than one acre
- Built: 1927
- Architect: Roy F. France
- Architectural style: Georgian Revival
- MPS: Suburban Apartment Buildings in Evanston TR
- NRHP reference No.: 84001000
- Added to NRHP: March 15, 1984

Lake Shore Apartments is a historic apartment building at 470-498 Sheridan Road in Evanston, Illinois. The three-story building was built in 1927. Its location was chosen to provide views of Lake Michigan and relative distance from Evanston's busier commercial areas; to compensate for this, the owners provided residents with transportation to local schools and public transit stations. Architect Roy F. France, who also designed several other Evanston apartment buildings, designed the building in the Georgian Revival style. The building features a brick exterior with terra cotta detailing, projecting bays and bow windows, and an arcade leading to a private courtyard.

The building was added to the National Register of Historic Places on March 15, 1984.
