= Shore Apartments =

Historical building in Miami, Florida, U.S.

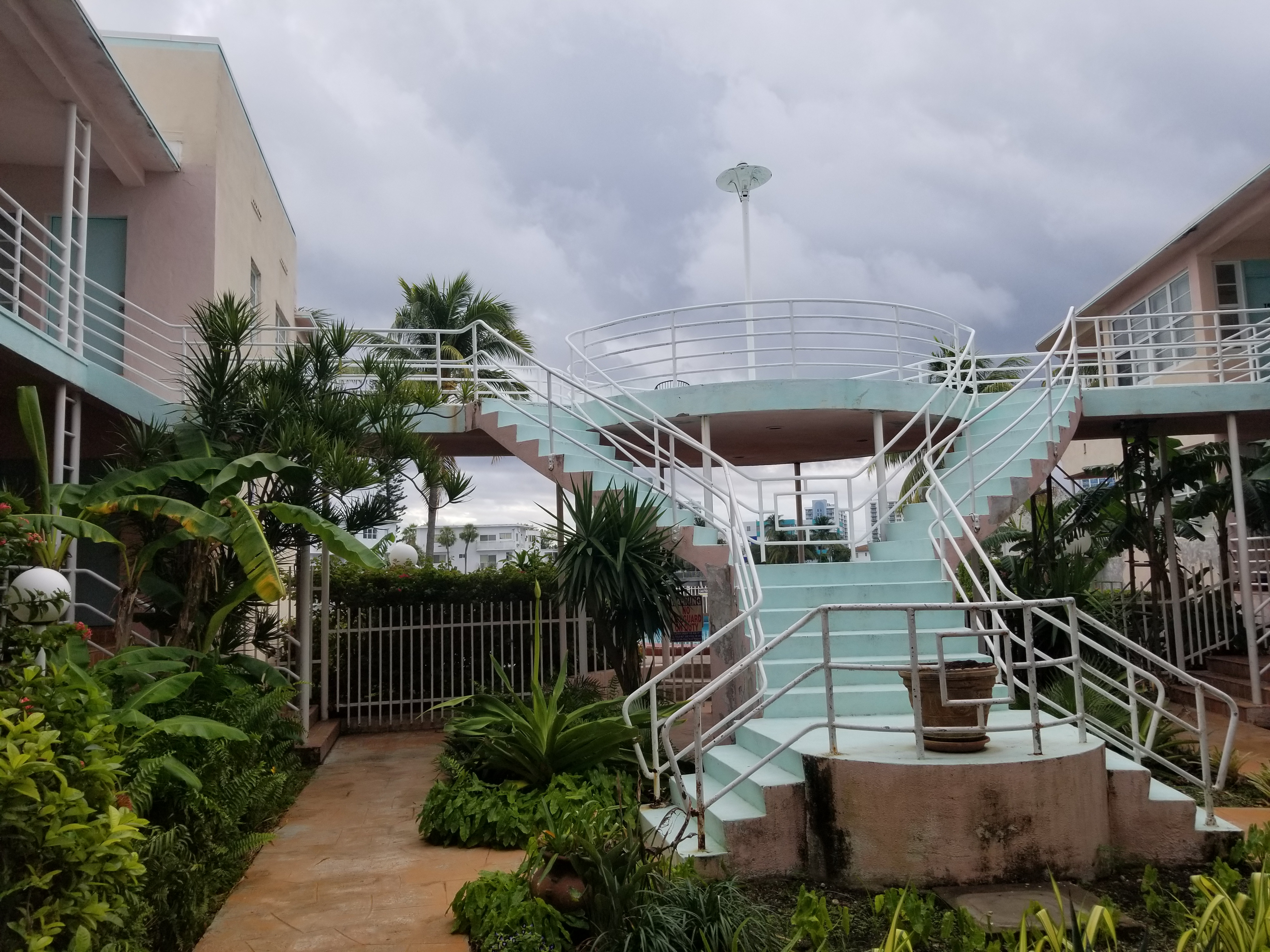
- Interactive map of the Shore Apartments area
- Former names: The Shore

General information
- Status: Completed
- Architectural style: Modern, Miami Modern
- Location: Miami Beach, Florida, U.S, 6881 Bay Drive
- Coordinates: 25.8545°N 80.1264°W
- Construction started: 1948
- Opened: January 9, 1949
- Cost: $300,000
- Owner: Bay Drive Condo Association Inc.

Technical details
- Floor count: 3

Design and construction
- Architect: Robert Swartburg
- Developer: Maurice Gusman
- Other designers: George Farras
- Main contractor: S.C. Davis Construction Co.
- Shore Apartments
- U.S. Historic district – Contributing property
- Location within Florida
- Coordinates: 25.8545°N 80.1264°W
- Part of: Normandy Isles Historic District (ID08001041)
- Designated CP: November 12, 2008

Shore Apartments (formerly known as “The Shore”) is a historical modernist landmark on Indian Creek in the Normandy Isles neighborhood of North Miami Beach, United States. It was designed by B. Robert Swartburg in 1948 for Maurice Gusman and opened on January 9, 1949.

The building is a contributing property to the Normandy Isles Historic District. The building's modern architecture featuring distinct Art Deco and Streamline elements of MiMo architectural style earned it listing on the National Register of Historic Places in 2008.

In 1995 the building was converted into a condominium and incorporated as a non-profit Bay Drive Condo Association, Inc.

== Site ==
The Shore Apartments building is located on the Normandy Isle in North Miami Beach. Shore Apartments building occupies a keystone-shaped lot with 100 feet Bay Drive frontage, 160 feet water frontage of Indian Creek, 196 feet on the south line and 170 feet on the north line. The entry lobby is on the east side of the Bay Drive street. The area surrounding the Shore Apartments building is home to other architectural landmarks, among them are Mediterranean-style fountain built in 1922 along the 71st Street by a French-born developer Henri Levy and King Cole Condos (previously known as King Cole Apartments and Yacht Basin).

== History ==
In 1922 Miami Beach developer Carl Fisher refused to partner with French-born Henri Levy due to Levy's Jewish heritage, but agreed to sell the land in the northern reaches of Miami Beach to him for independent development projects. Levi named the land Normandy Isle after his homeland in France. Normandy Isle houses and apartment buildings were planned around three main areas: a central business district along 71st Street, a golf course in the northern portion of the property, and a grand hotel on the southeastern tip of the site.

The development of the site slowed down after the real estate crash of 1926 and was renewed in the post WWII era fueled by the steady population growth.

In 1948 a businessman and philanthropist Maurice Gusman, the developer of the historical Olympia Theater commissioned Robert Swartburg to design a small luxury apartment building that would cost $300,000 (equivalent to $4.02 million in 2025). The original interiors of the apartments were commissioned to George Farkas, a Miami-based industrial designer. Farkas became a nationally recognized name after his prize-winning fabric designs were exhibited in the "Printed Textiles for the Home: Prize-winning Designs from National Competition" organized by the Department of Industrial Design at the Museum of Modern Art.

== Design ==
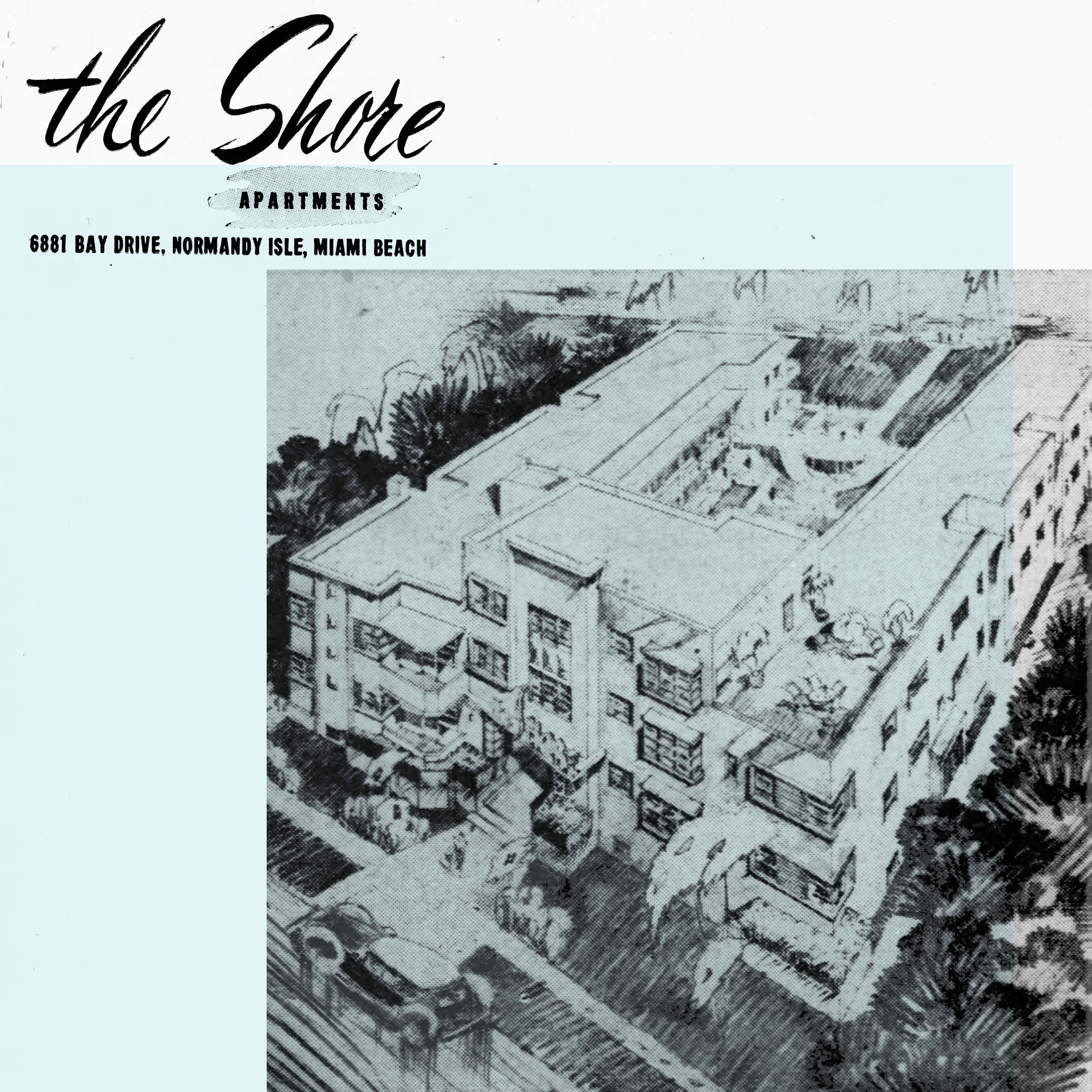
Shore Apartments design drawing 1948.

The Shore Apartments building has a keystone shape following the shape of the lot it was built on. At the time of its inception, there were 22 units with 3 two-bedroom/two-bath apartments, 17 one-bedroom apartments and 2 efficiencies. The third-floor penthouse had a private terrace. All apartments featured a terrace facing either Indian creek or the interior patio decorated with a large flower and lily pool. One of the main attraction of the building was a large private dock for six boats.

=== Architectural style ===
The building is designed in the early Mid-century modern architectural style with streamline and MiMo style elements.

=== Facade ===
The facade of the Shore Apartments building featured an open breezeway, extending a third of the width of the front of the building, creating a view of the patio and Indian creek from the side.

== In popular culture ==
Artist and photographer Anastasia Samoylova photography book Flood Zone features a photo of the Shore Apartments building facade detail with round streamline windows.

== Notable tenants ==
- Katja Esson
- Ekaterina Juskowski
