= Ken Fields =

American real estate developer and environmentalist

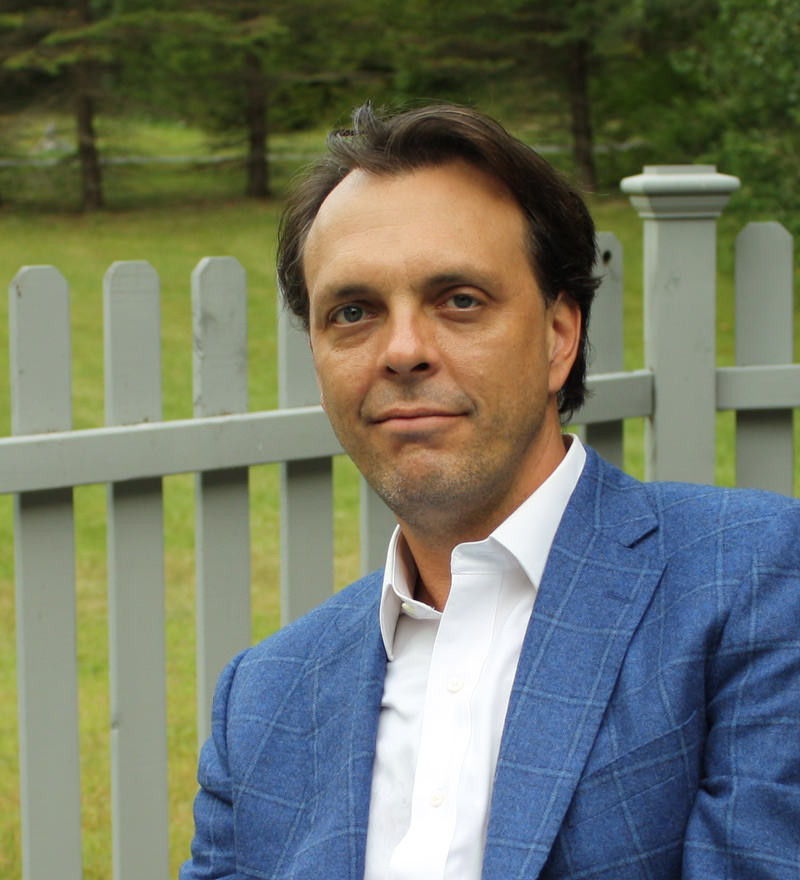
- Fields in 2015
- Born: New York, NY, US
- Education: Brown University
- Occupations: Real estate developer, entrepreneur, philanthropist
- Spouse: Nikki Noya
- Children: 1

Ken Fields is an American real estate developer, environmental entrepreneur and philanthropist. He redeveloped a MiMo motel in South Beach into The Creek South Beach, founded the School Charging Program, ran as an independent candidate in the 2016 United States presidential election, and with his wife, Nikki Noya, directs the Noya Fields Family Funds.

== Career ==
=== Real estate development ===
Fields is a hotel and hospitality investor and developer. In 2002, he purchased the Ankara Motel property on 23rd Street and Collins Avenue in the Collins Park neighborhood of South Beach. The motel was built in 1954 by the architecture firm of Reiff & Feldman and is an example of Googie style architecture in South Beach. Fields redeveloped the property into Miami Beach's first arts hotel, inviting artists to design individual rooms (including Shepard Fairey and Kunzo Minami) and renamed the property The Creek South Beach. The redevelopment and design concept was praised in the press, winning best hotel in Miami Beach from Miami New Times.

=== Environmental industry participation ===
Fields has been quoted by the media discussing tax benefits and financial incentives as an industry expert in The Miami Herald and Plum TV. He has been a supporter of EcoMB. In 2010 he established the not-for-profit School Charging Program to donate electric vehicle charging stations to schools and other educational institutions.

== Philanthropy ==
In 2016 Fields and Noya established a donor-advised fund at the California Community Foundation focused on the environment and civil liberties, and they also took over a fund his parents had set up in 1992 at the New York Community Trust. Inside Philanthropy reported in 2017 that the couple made grant decisions jointly, with about $200,000 a year in grants, including to Our Children's Trust and Grist. The family also supports environmental and education causes.

== Politics ==
On November 30, 2015, Fields registered with the FEC as an Independent Presidential Candidate for 2016. His primary campaign promise was to commit the US to 100% renewable energy in 20 years.

== Personal life ==
Fields is married to Nikki Noya; they have a daughter.

== See also ==
- The Creek South Beach
- EcoMB
- Collins Park
