= Hotel Deauville (Miami) =

Hotel in Florida, United States

Coordinates: 25.85069°N 80.12011°W

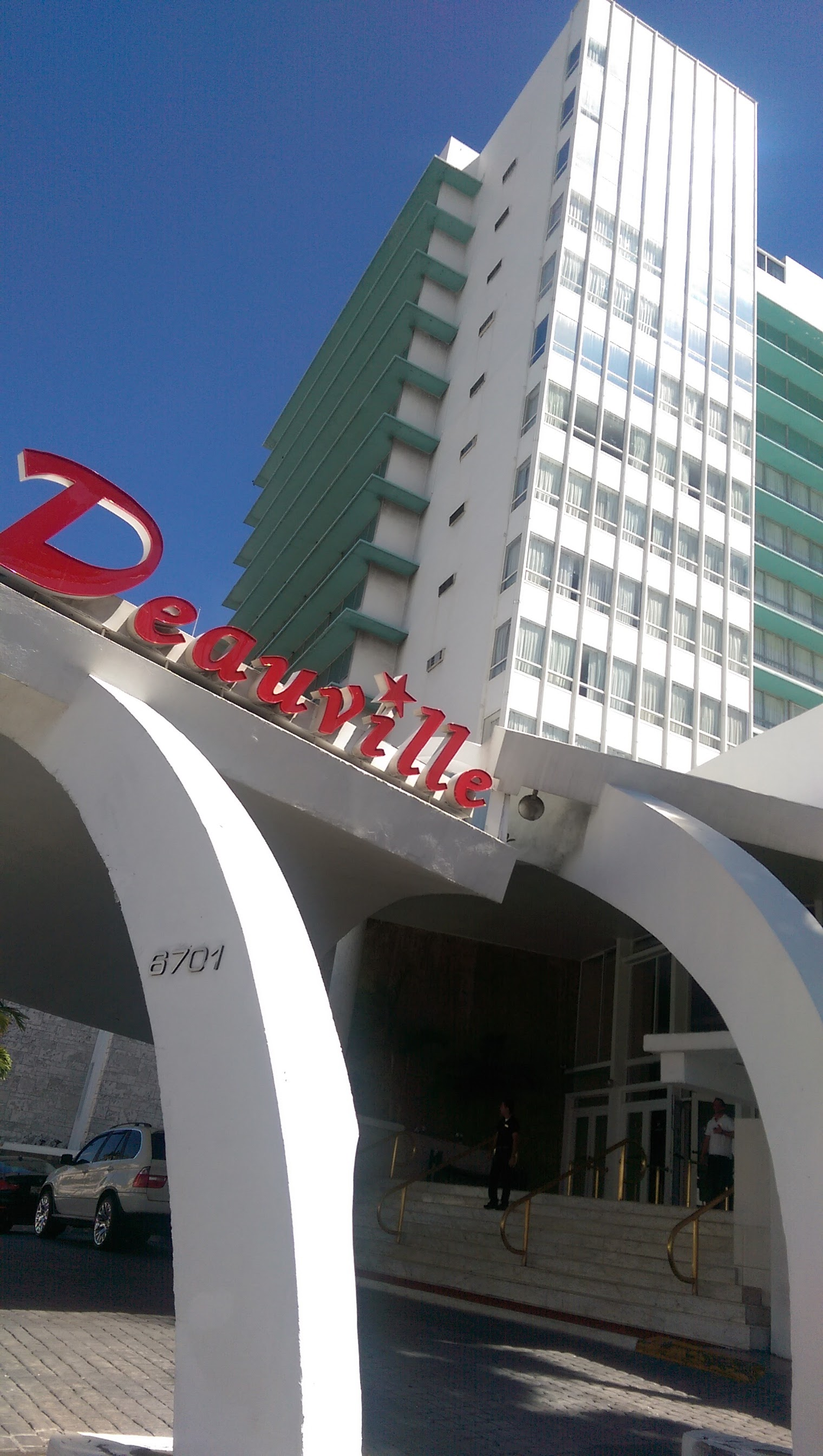
Deauville Hotel

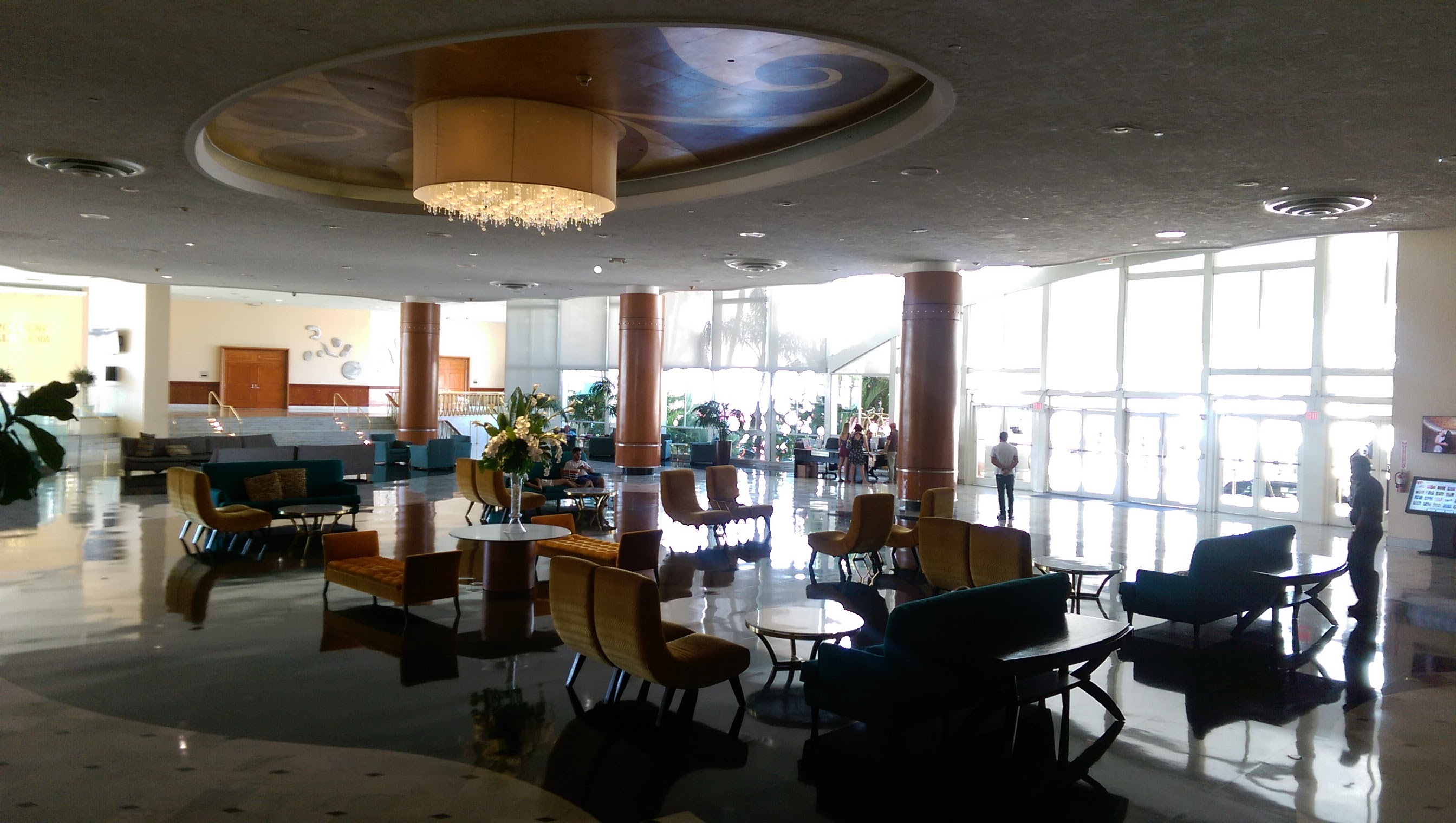
Deauville Hotel

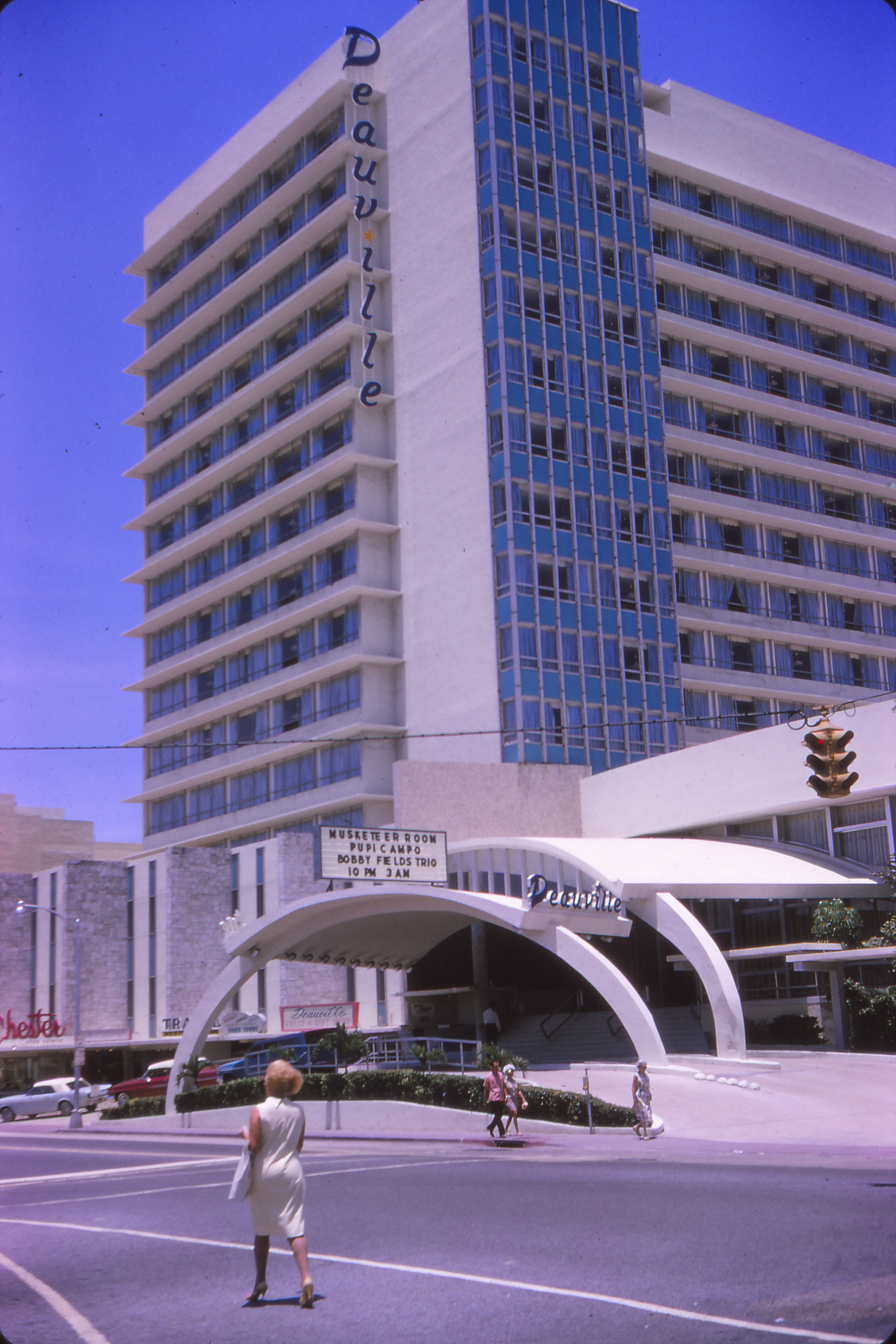
June 1964 Deauville Hotel

The Deauville Beach Resort at 6701 Collins Ave, Miami Beach, FL 33141, was a celebrated beachfront hotel on Miami Beach. Built in the Miami Modern architecture style in 1957, it was designed by Melvin Grossman.

The Beatles played their second Ed Sullivan Show appearance at the hotel on February 16, 1964.

Alex Meruelo was the de facto owner of the historical hotel. Following an electrical fire that closed the hotel in 2017, Meruelo has been embroiled in a public controversy, being accused of deliberately allowing the building to fall into disrepair so it could be demolished for development. A limited liability company associated with him has been fined multiple times by the City of Miami Beach for such violations. In early 2022, the LLC filed papers for demolition. Local activists and preservationists unsuccessfully petitioned to try to save the hotel from destruction.

The Deauville Beach Resort's 17-story hotel tower was imploded on Sunday, November 13, 2022. Apparently the Napoleon Ballroom, where The Beatles had played is the last part of the hotel remaining and is soon to be demolished.

It is currently unknown what will be replacing the hotel. The owner of the Miami Dolphins, Stephen M. Ross, had plans to purchase the property and build two towers on the site, one hotel and one luxury condominium. But due to the planned towers exceeding current city height codes, the proposal placed on the November 8, 2022 ballot, was voted against by residents.

== 1920s hotel ==
The original 1926 hotel and casino was built by Joe Elsener. In 1936 it became the MacFadden-Deauville after purchase by Bernarr MacFadden.
