= Noya Fields Family Funds =

U.S. group of charitable foundations

- Formation: 1992
- Type: Charitable Foundation
- Location: New York, New York, United States
- Website: www.noyafieldsfamily.org

The Noya Fields Family Funds is a group of charitable foundations that provide funding and support to non-profit organizations primarily in the United States. The organization operates through two donor advised funds, one with The New York Community Trust the other with The California Community Foundation.

== Background ==
The foundation was established with The New York Community Trust by Judith and Norman Fields in 1992. It has focused primarily on grants to cultural, educational, health and arts organizations in the greater New York and New England areas.

The organization was expanded in 2016 when Ken Fields and Nikki Noya established a second fund at the California Community Foundation with the purpose to address a broader range of issues specifically related to Climate Change and Civil Liberties, citing the two "as inextricably entwined – we have one planet and we all need to live here."

In recent years donor advised funds have been controversial for, among other concerns, their lack of transparency. The Noya Fields Family Funds has refused to disclose assets but has been pro-active in publicizing their activities. While expanding their financial base they are also pursuing a more modern philanthropic strategy of actively engaging and becoming participants within the organizations they support, making an effort to be more transparent than expected.

== Notable grants ==
- Direct grant to Grist for its first Video Fellow in support of environmental journalism and digital media.
- Direct grant to "Our Children's Trust" in support of the constitutional legal efforts to remedy climate change.
- Direct grant to "Swale New York" in support of urban agriculture and education in New York City.

== Initiatives ==
In addition to simply providing grants to organizations, both Ken Fields and Nikki Noya work actively to help create sustainable initiatives for new programs within existing not for profit organizations.

Noya Fields Family Funds have for many years been annual sponsors of the Dress For Success Miami annual gala, where Nikki Noya has served as Vice President of the board." In 2017 they helped launch the Suited For Success Veterans job training program. In June 2017 the first group of veterans graduated from the program and reported unanimously positive feedback in confidence, employment skills and job search success. The program is set to continue throughout 2017 and beyond to expand employment opportunities for veterans in South Florida.
