= Robert Swartburg =

American architect (1895–1975)

B. Robert Swartburg
- Born: July 27, 1895; Bucharest, Romania
- Died: December 7, 1975 (aged 80); Miami, Florida
- Education: Columbia University
- Occupation: Architect
- Spouse(s): Lilian Swartburg, née. Kalan Dumas
- Parent(s): Esther and Morris Swartburg
- Buildings: Delano Hotel, Vagabond Motel Bass Museum
- Projects: Miami Beach Convention Center

B. Robert Swartburg (born Barnet Robert Swartburg; July 27, 1895 - December 7, 1975) was a U.S. architect who practiced primarily in New York and Florida. He is associated with Modern and Streamline Moderne architecture and contributed to the development of the MiMo style in South Florida during the post–World War II period. Over a 35-year career, he is credited with designing more than 1,000 buildings. In addition to his architectural work, Swartburg was a painter and created murals and sculptures incorporated into his buildings..

== Life ==
Born in Bucharest, Romania in 1895 Swartburg immigrated to the United States with his parents during childhood. In 1900, his parents, Morris and Esther Swartburg, moved to New York from London with their two children, Robert and Jeannette. His father was a wood carver who introduced him to the craft at an early age.

Swartburg began working at a young age, first in his father’s shop and later as an office boy for an architect at age nine. To finance his education, he worked at a Broadway drugstore soda fountain, taught dancing, and competed as an amateur boxer.

On June 8, 1947, Swartburg married Lilian Kalan Dumas, who worked in music publishing in New York City and is credited with discovering the songg "It's a Sin to Tell A Lie.". The couple remained married until his death in Miami in 1975.

== Education ==
Swartburg studied architecture at the Columbia University Graduate School of Architecture, Planning and Preservation under Frederic Charles Hirons, Harvey Wiley Corbett and Maurice J Privot..He also attended the École des Beaux-Arts in Paris, studied at the Palace of Fontainebleau, and was affiliated with the American Academy in Rome. During his time in Rome, he spent a year working in the Vatican under the supervision of Pope Pius XI.

== New York ==
In 1917, Swartburg opened an architectural office in New York and designed residential buildings at Fordham University, as well as in Manhattan, the Bronx, and Chicago. In 1961, Lawrence Schmitt, president of the Silver Creek Precision Company, appointed Swartburg to head a management team overseeing the expansion of North Orlando.

== Miami ==
Swartburg first came to Miami in 1925, where he remained for three years, and returned in 1944, continuing to practice there until his retirement. He designed hotels and residential buildings, including the Delano Hotel, the Shore Apartments, the Executive, and the Sorrento Hotel. During the 1960s, he received two major government commissions: the Miami-Dade Civic Center and the Miami Beach Justice Building.

In 1972, he merged his firm with Grove–Haack & Associates and subsequently served as a consultant. According to the 1971 edition of Polk’s city directory, Swartburg maintained an office in the Roosevelt Building (4014 Chase Avenue, Suite 220, Miami Beach, Florida) and resided in a house he had built in 1936 at 2940 Flamingo Drive, Miami Beach. The house featured a Georgian-style door carved by Swartburg after he was unable to find a local plasterer to execute the design.

In 2018, several buildings designed by Swartburg in Miami Beach were designated as historic landmarks, alongside works by architects such as Morris Lapidus, Igor Polevitzky and Charles McKirahan to protect their architectural heritage. In 1963, he faced allegations of construction deficiencies related to the Justice Building project.

== Architectural style ==
Swartburg was a Modernist architect active in Miami beginning in the mid-1920s. He designed resort and residential buildings and later undertook major public commissions, including the Miami Beach Convention Center and the Miami-Dade Civic Center. Among his best-known projects is the Delano Hotel in Miami Beach, which has been described as one of Florida’s prominent historic hotels and is noted for featuring both indoor and outdoor lobby spaces The Vagabond Motel, a designated City of Miami historic landmark, is regarded as a representative example of the Miami Modern style, characterized by its open-air plan, jalousie windows, geometric ornamentation, overhanging rooflines, and open verandas with catwalks. Swartburg also designed the Metro Justice Building and additional residential developments in Miami Beach.

The Shore and Bayside condominium buildings incorporate design elements associated with resort architecture, including intersecting planes, screen-block windows, and angled structural supports, reflecting characteristics of the Miami Modern style.

== List of projects ==
- Garden Bay Manor, 1939
- Delano Hotel, 1947 - one of the first hotels built after WWII. The hotel was named after President Franklin Delano Roosevelt. The hotel’s deco styling is more provocative than most, with sharp angles, and a towering verticality.
- Vagabond Motel, 1953 - designed in the spacey-futuristic Miami-Modern style, the Vagabond was "an expression of the optimistic belief in the future of this time." The building was restored by Miami real estate developer Avra Jain, who specializes in historic preservation development. The Vagabond Motel, with its futuristic asymmetry and angularity, was a vision of Miami Modern. Designed in 1953 by Robert Swartburg, today it has been thoroughly reinvented and modernized, with a chic pool scene, high-end eatery and more.
- Bass Museum, 1963 conversion
- Marseille Hotel, 1948
- Metro Justice Building
- Shore Apartments (6881 Bay Drive Condo), 1948 - is one of the signature buildings representing Miami Modern post-war style protected as part of Normandy Isle Historic District.
- Belle Towers, Belle Island, FL 1958 - “A private estate would serve as a better comparison…the quiet seclusion required for refined gracious living is zealously guard- ed by the carefully selected staff of Belle Towers.”
- Miami Beach Convention Hall
- 960 Bay Drive, 1950 - is one of more than 200 mid-century buildings designated historic by Miami Beach, granting it special protections from demolition.
- The Executive Apartments, 1959. - "Furthermore, the design genius of one of Miami Beach’s most distinctive architects, B. Robert Swartburg (architect of the Delano Hotel), was represented in the compact but highly spirited architecture of The Executive apartments (1959)"
- Bayside Apartments, 1952 - condo with the appeal of a seaside resort featuring a dramatic entrance of intersecting planes, screen-block boxed windows and angled beanpoles.

== Famous buildings ==
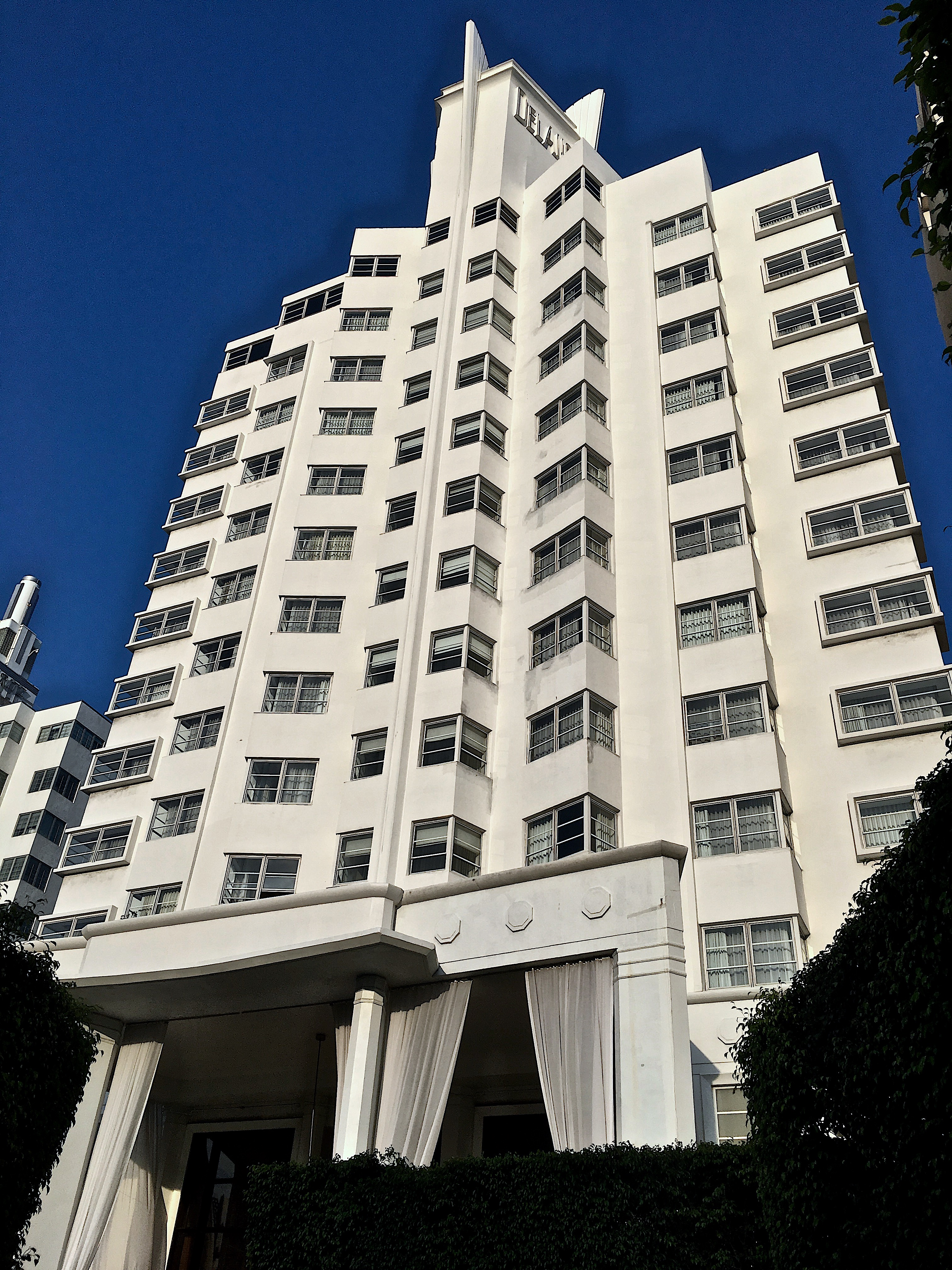
Delano Hotel South Beach, 1947

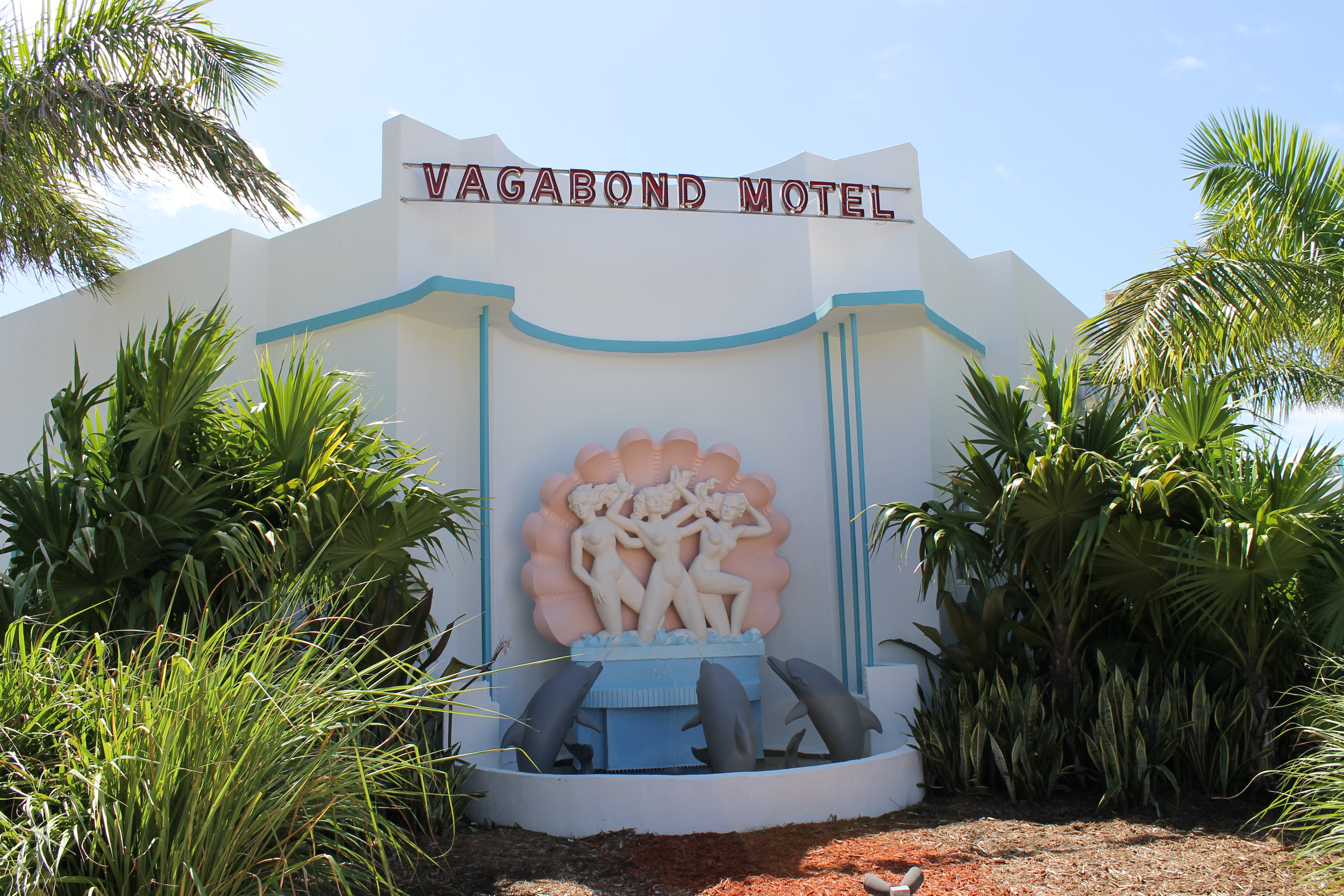
Vagabond Motel, 1953

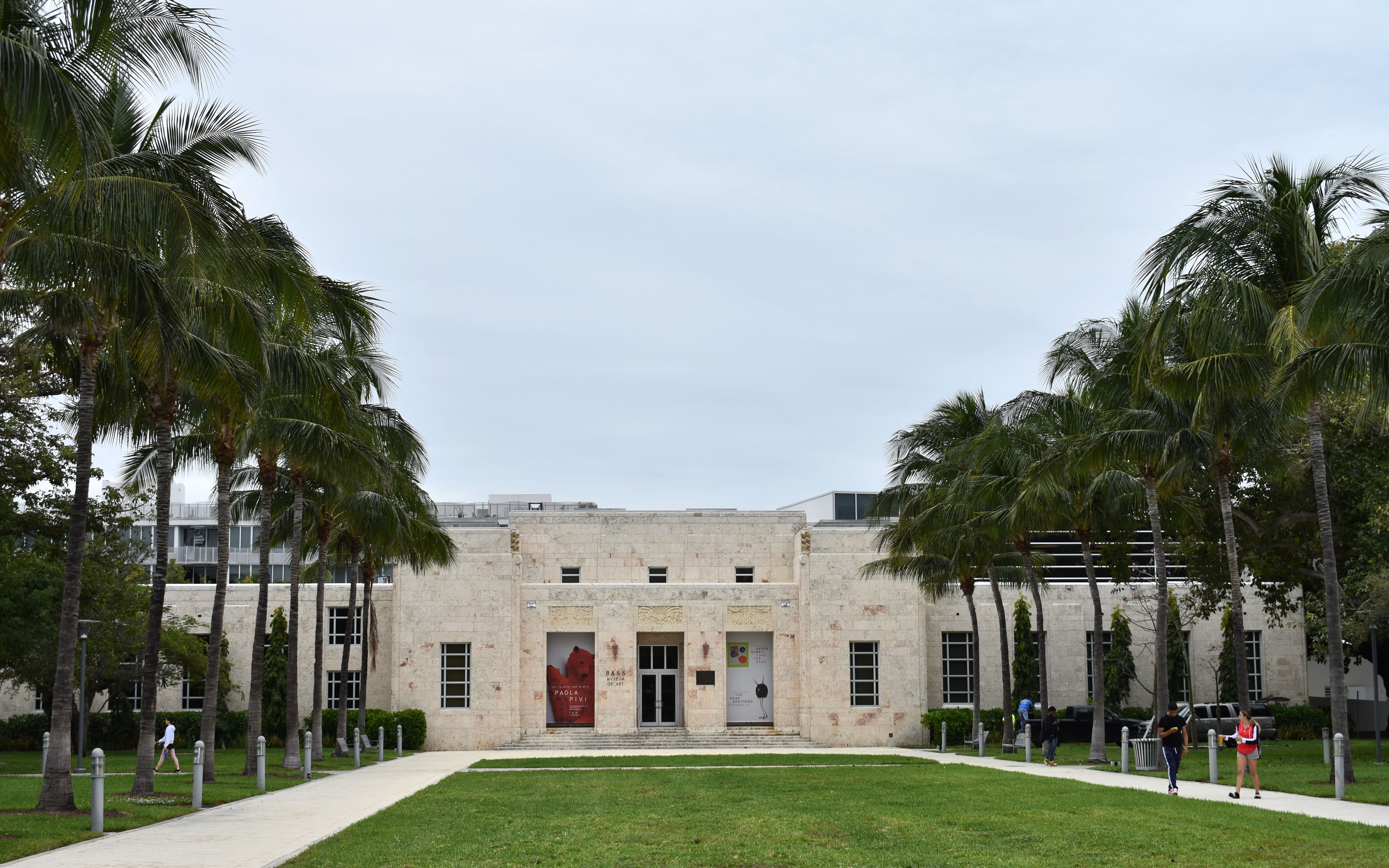
Bass Museum, South Beach, 1963

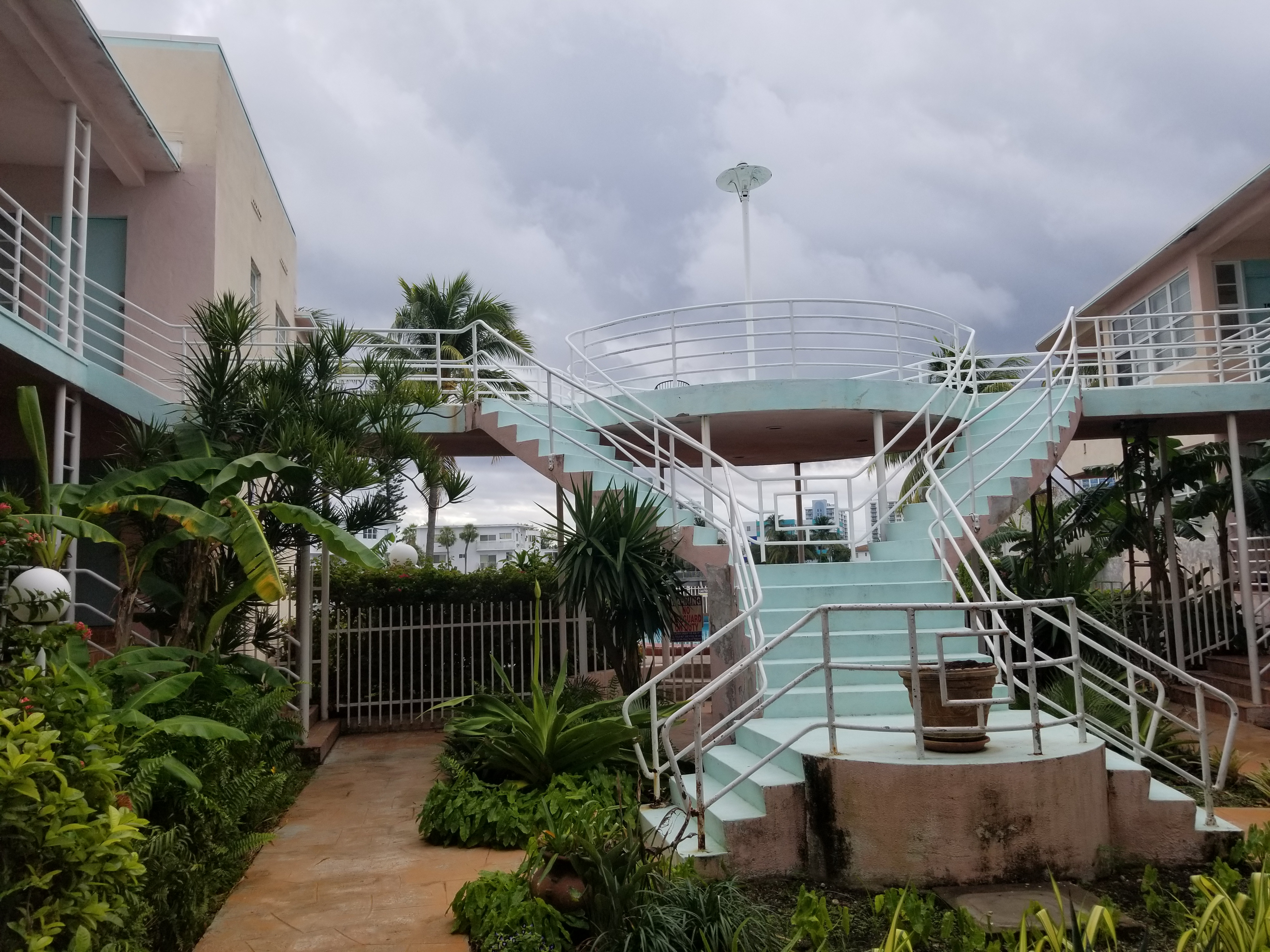
Shore Apartments, 6881 Bay Drive Condo

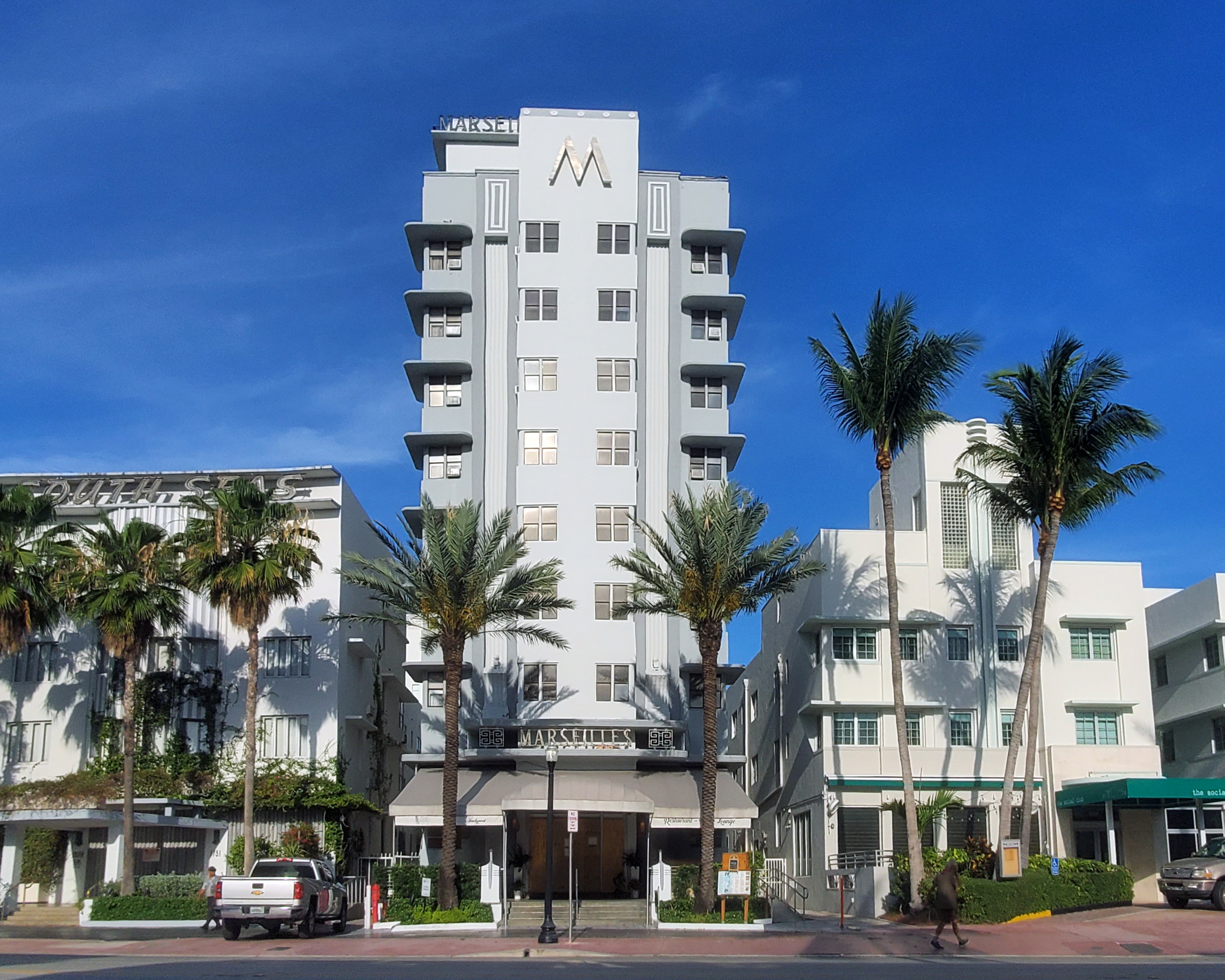
Marseilles Hotel, 1947
