= Delano Miami Beach Hotel =

Hotel

Delano Hotel - South Beach Miami

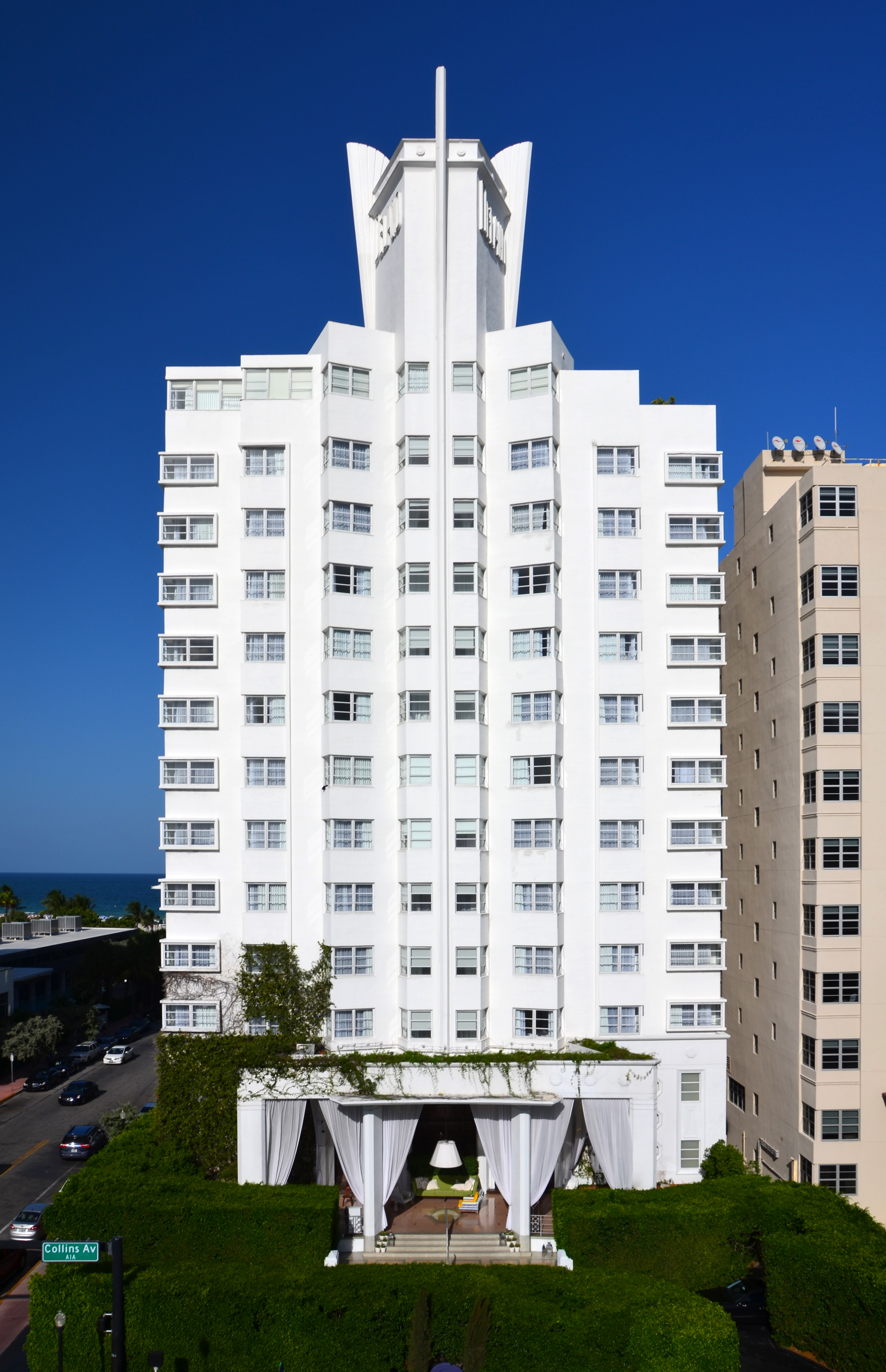

General information
- Status: under renovations
- Location: Miami Beach, Florida, United States, 1685 Collins Avenue
- Coordinates: 25°47′32″N 80°07′46″W
- Opening: 1947; 79 years ago
- Closed: March 2020; 6 years ago
- Owner: Eldridge Industries
- Operator: Ennismore

Technical details
- Floor count: 15
- Floor area: 2,500 square feet (230 m^{2})

Design and construction
- Architect: Robert Swartburg
- Developer: Rob and Rose Schwartz

Other information
- Number of rooms: 171
- Parking: 700

The Delano Hotel (Note: Pronounced /ˈdəlɑːnoʊ/ DE-lə-NOH) is an upscale resort hotel located directly on the beach in South Beach, Florida. The Delano is known for its whimsical, art deco styling and its celebrity clientele, its pool was one of the few hotel pools in Miami Beach where female toplessness was allowed. In 2007, the Delano South Beach was ranked in the American Institute of Architects list of "America's Favorite Architecture". On April 18, 2012, the AIA's Florida Chapter placed the Delano South Beach on its list Florida Architecture: 100 Years. 100 Places. It is operated by Delano Hotels.

== History ==
Designed by architect B. Robert Swartburg, the Delano was built in 1947 by Rob and Rose Schwartz, and opened on December 15, 1948. At 14 stories plus a 35-foot tower, it was one of the tallest and earliest of the Postwar Modern, or MiMo, hotels in Miami Beach. The 1994 renovations were designed by Philippe Starck. The hotel was named after US President Franklin Delano Roosevelt.

The Delano was a part of the Morgans Hotel Group collection prior to MHG being purchased by SBE Entertainment Group. SBE Entertainment sold the hotel to Eldridge Industries, and the hotel closed in March 2020, due to the COVID-19 pandemic. It reopened in June 2026.

== Re-development and art program ==
The 2020s redevelopment was designed by Elastic Architects in collaboration with Ennismore's design team. The hotel's art program was curated by artist and social historian Nicola Green - it includes works by contemporary artists including Nina Surel, Edouard Duval-Carrié, Marielle Plaisir, Emma Ortiz, Natalie Galindo, Richard Rodriguez, Joel Gaitan, Alissa Alfonso and Cornelius Tulloch.The program focuses on artists connected to South Florida's contemporary art community.

In 2026, the Delano's redevelopment received three Ahead Awards, in the categories of Hotel Renovation, Lobby and Bar. The judges described the project as " a masterful reinvigoration of a storied brand, respecting Delano's past and bridging to its future."

== Delano Hotels chain ==
Delano Hotels is an American hotel company headquartered in Miami. As of 2026, it has three hotels.

=== Current hotels ===
- Delano Miami Beach
- Maison Delano Paris
- Delano Dubai

=== Former hotels ===
- Delano Las Vegas – opened 2014, sold 2020, management ceased in 18 December 2024, now owned by MGM Resorts International and VICI Properties since 2020 and managed by W Hotels since 2024.

=== Gallery ===
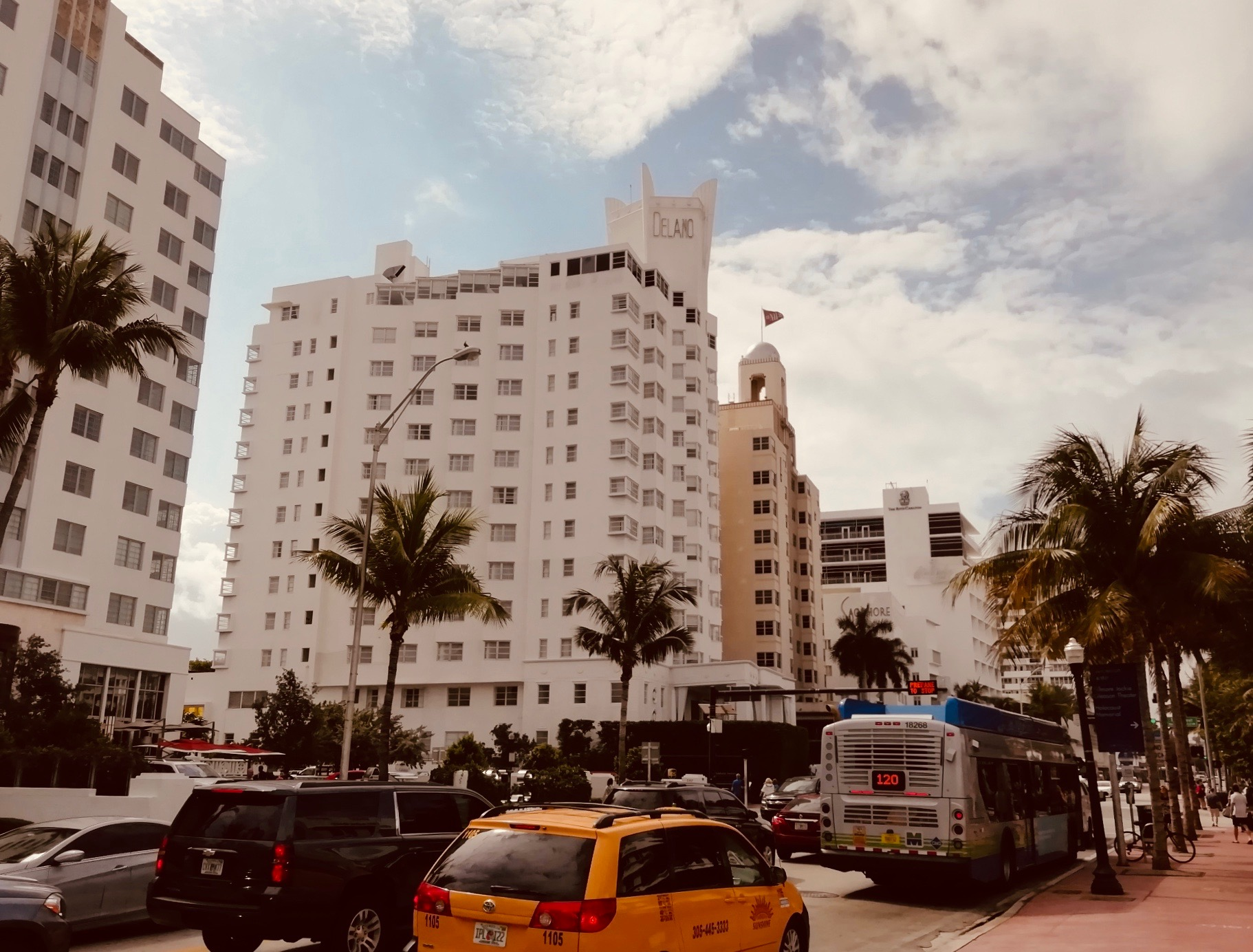
The property, viewed from the north.

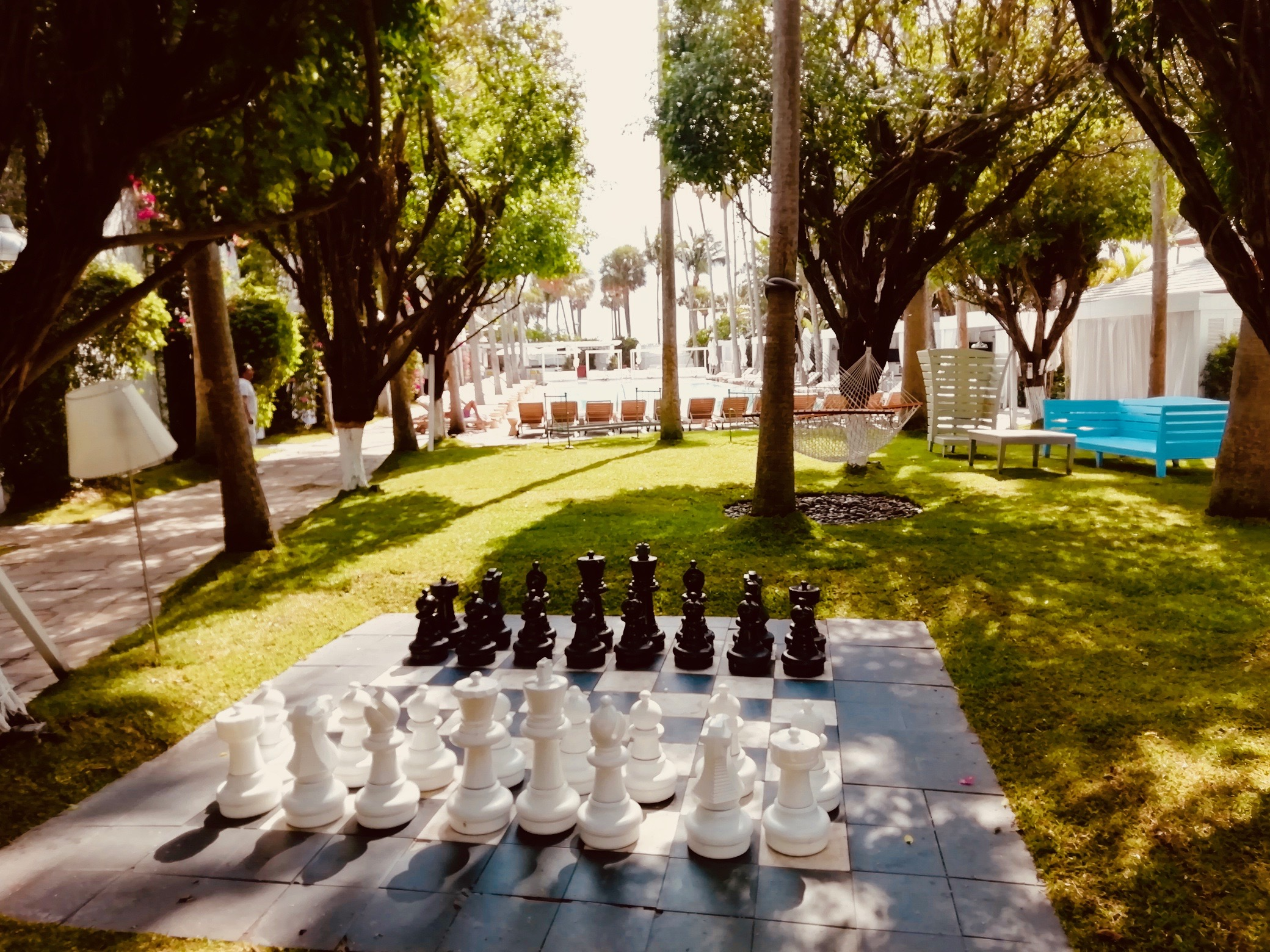
A view of the gardens and pool (in background)

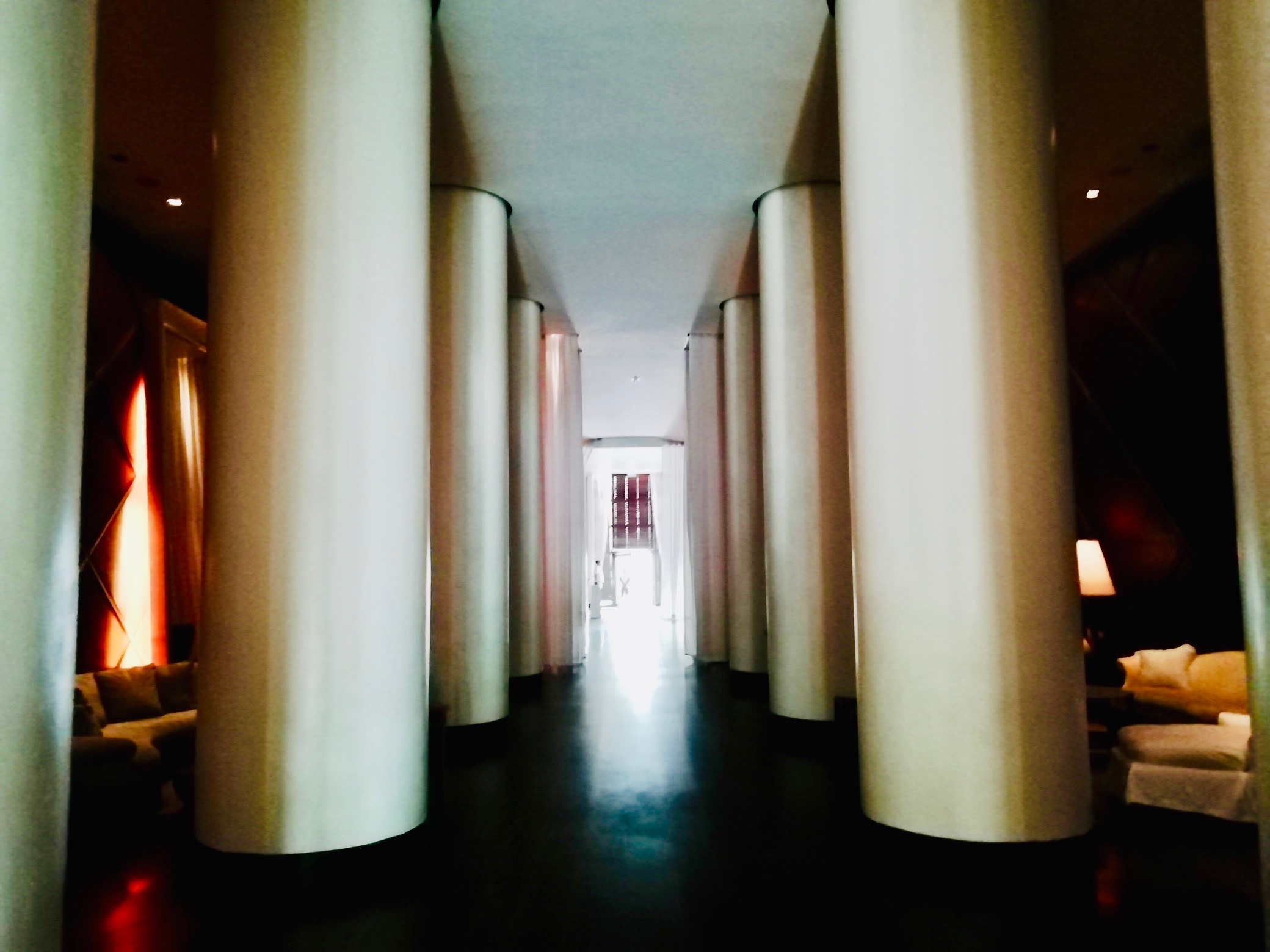
Karnak Hall

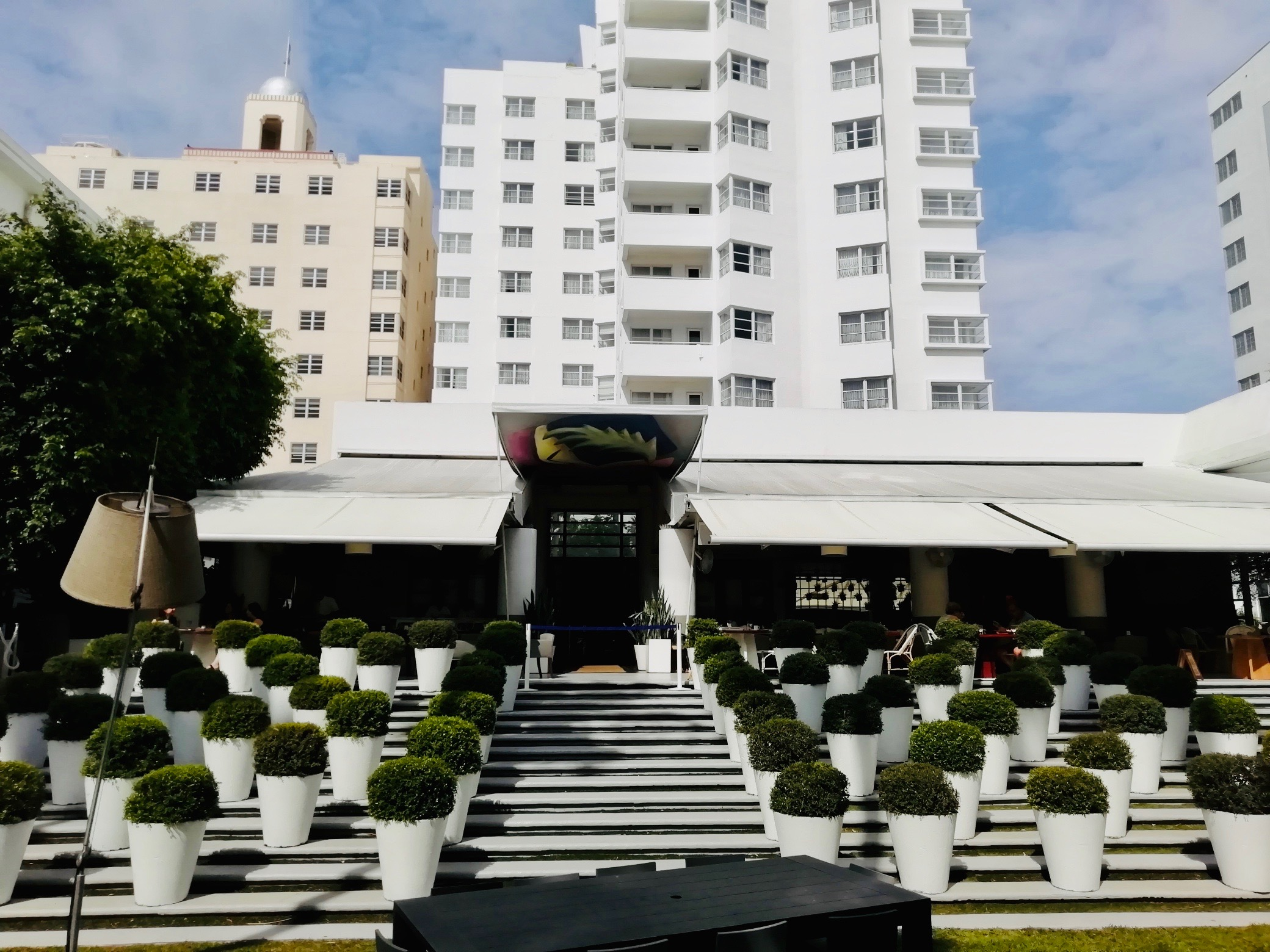
The garden steps
