= The Creek South Beach =

Motel located in the U.S.

Coordinates: 25.77823°N 80.13214°W

The Creek South Beach is a 90-room motel located on Collins Avenue and 23rd Street in the American city of Miami Beach, Florida.

The motel's building is an example of Miami Modern architecture (MiMo) and is situated just north of the Art Deco District, in the Collins Park neighborhood and the CANDO (Cultural Arts Neighborhood District Overlay) in Miami Beach. The motel's building is one of the few remaining examples of post-World War II motel architecture in Miami and the only example in Miami Beach's South Beach neighborhood.

The property has been featured as an architecturally significant structure in the book on MiMo architecture MiMo: Miami Modern Revealed.

== History and design ==
The Creek South Beach (originally named The Ankara Motel) was built in 1954 by the architecture firm of Reiff & Feldman. Designed in a classic motel or googie-style "L" shape, "the central element is a radically cantilevered-raked delta-wing roof, perched lightly as a paper airplane atop a triangular glass lobby." The lobby design sets the tone for architectural elements throughout – zigzagged lines, floating staircases encased in brick and a central pylon overlooking the waterway.

The popularity of the property rose and fell with Miami Beach's economic tides changing hands and names many times over. By the turn of the 21st century, the motel was operated as a youth hostel under the name of Banana Bungalow and suffered from severe neglect and poor maintenance.

In 2003, the property was purchased by Ken Fields, who renamed it The Creek South Beach and turned the motel into the first art hotel on Miami Beach. Young artists from across the country were invited to design individual rooms, re-christened The Creek: Signature Series. The project managers for the Signature Series were Bo Sundius of Bunch Design and Tim Ronan of SBK Global, with curatorial input and coordinator of artists' installations from artist Ellen Jong. The hotel re-opened in time for Art Basel Miami Beach 2002, hosting guests including Jeffrey Deitch of Deitch Projects. The Creek South Beach won Best Hotel in Miami New Times Best Of 2003.

== Signature Series artists ==
- UNDO (art collective) – Ninos Jugando
- Inkheads (graffiti collective) – Inkredible Hieroglyphics
- Justine Harari (photographer and film maker) – Lights
- Brendan Carney (fine artist) – Surveying Surveillance
- Camella Ehlke (founder of Triple Five Soul and hotelier) – Camo-Clash
- Kenzo Minami (contemporary artist) – Morgenröthe
- Shepard Fairey (contemporary artist) – Obey
- Justin Luke (founder of www.audiovisualarts.org) – Ouro Puro
- Kate Ruth and Brooke Geahan – Honeymoon Suite
- Devon Dikeou (publisher and art collector) – Reading Room
- Kiku and Che Jen (Barn Stormers) – Americana
- Oliver Lutz (contemporary artist) – Frustom: Sniper
- Hisako Ichiki (architect) – 365 Days
- Marina Zurkow (graphic artist) – Instructions for Sleeping
- Hilary Read (brand and environment designer) – Message in a Bottle
- Howard Fonda (artist and teacher at the School of the Art Institute of Chicago) – Plato's Cave
- Donald Hearn (contemporary artist) – Dazzle Painting
- Level Design (architecture firm) – Home

== Artist-designed rooms ==
Message In A Bottle

Camo Clash

== In film and television ==
The Creek South Beach has been featured as a back drop for several films and television productions over the years, most notably the films The Specialist (1994), Bad Boys (1995), Transporter 2 (2005) and several episodes of the television series Miami Vice.

== See also ==
- List of motels
- Miami Beach Architectural District
