= Collins Park =

Collins Park may refer to:

- Collins Park, Miami Beach
- Collins Park (Bayonne, New Jersey)
- Collins Park, Delaware
