= 1973 Miami Beach firebombing =

Attack in Miami, Florida

Coordinates: 25.7952°N 80.1291°W

- Location: Miami Beach, Florida, U.S.
- Date: February 2, 1973; 53 years ago
- Attack type: Firebombing, arson
- Deaths: 3
- Injuries: 139
- Perpetrator: Charles Reardon

On February 2, 1973, a man walked into the crowded Concord Cafeteria in Miami Beach, Florida, poured gasoline out of a large jar, lit a match, ignited the gasoline, and ran out of the cafeteria. Three people were killed and 139 were injured, including many people who were severely burned.

== Location ==
The Concord Cafeteria was located at 1921 Collins Avenue in Miami Beach. It was founded in 1947 by Morris Himelstein, who also owned and operated six Concord Cafeterias in New York City. It had 250 seats and served inexpensive, home style food to about 3000 diners a day, many of them retirees. It functioned as an informal social center as well as a restaurant.

== The attack ==
On the night of February 2, 1973, a man walked into the cafeteria which was crowded with diners, poured gasoline out a jar, ignited it with a match, and ran out of the restaurant. Intense flames spread very rapidly. People attempted to escape but were obstructed by the turnstiles used to control access to the restaurant. A witness who was a worker at an adjoining restaurant said that he had "rushed out into the street and scores of old people were lying on the sidewalks and in the road moaning and screaming in lots of pain." Another witness said that he saw the interior of the restaurant in flames and "all the glass was broken and the front was gone." Victims were taken to four different hospitals suffering from burns and smoke inhalation, and fourteen people were in critical condition two days later. Three people died.

== The aftermath ==
Twenty-two minutes after the fire began, 49-year-old Charles Reardon of Bal Harbour, Florida, walked into a police station, and said, "I've done something terrible. I've made a lot of people scream." After being questioned for 12 hours, Reardon was charged with arson and use of a destructive device. He was never prosecuted because he was found incompetent to be tried due to mental illness.

After several months of renovations, the Concord Cafeteria reopened. It was the last cafeteria in Miami Beach when it closed ten years later, in June, 1983.

Many lawsuits against the cafeteria were filed by victims, which were consolidated into a case called Concord Florida, Inc. v. Lewin. The trial court found the restaurant liable in 1975 and a district appeals court agreed in 1977, ruling that by "failing to adequately protect its patrons from fire by providing proper safety measures such as emergency exits and signs indicating the location of said exits, appellant-Concord assumed the foreseeable risk that fire might someday trap its patrons leaving them without an escape route."
