= Vagabond Motel =

- U.S. National Register of Historic Places
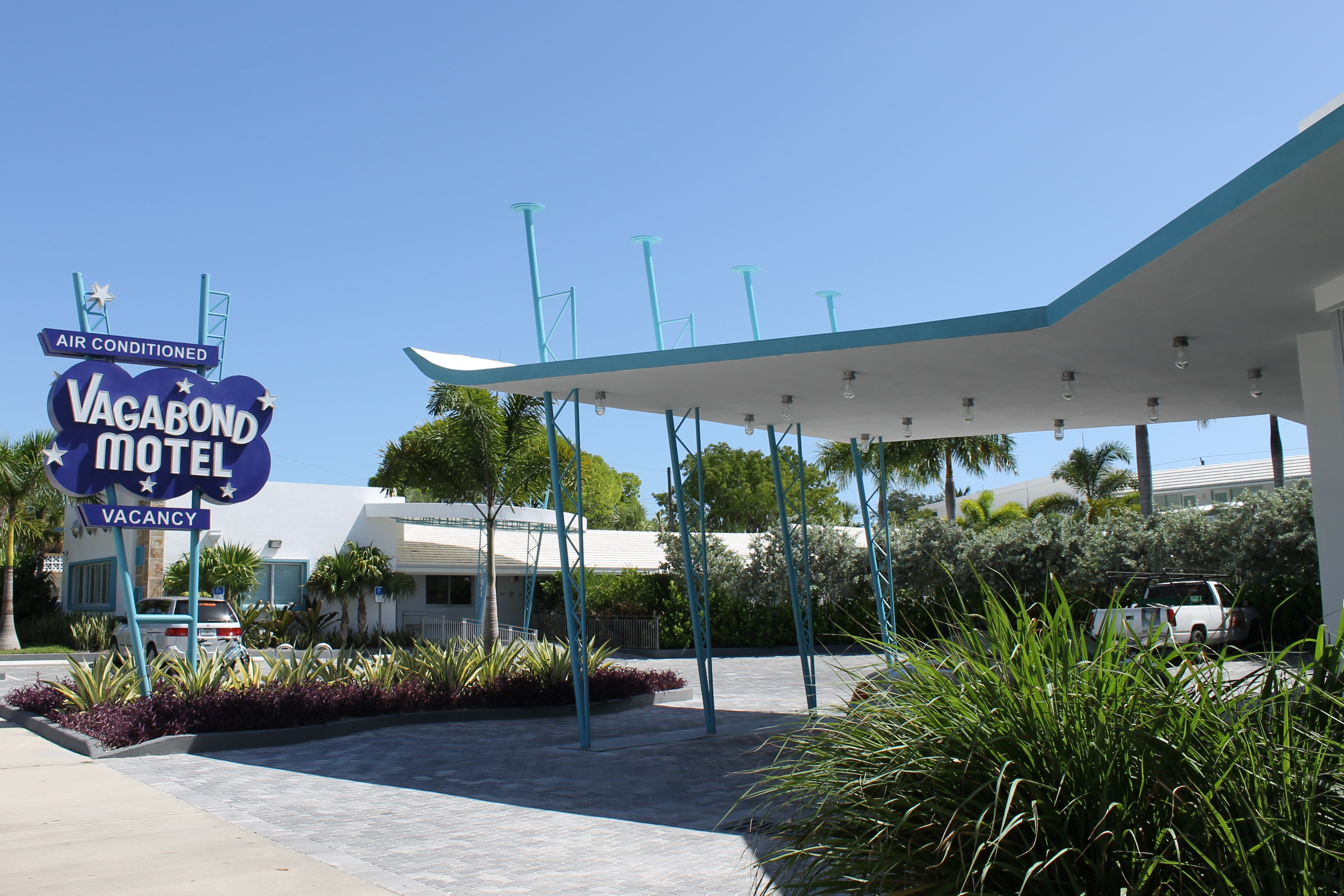
- Vagabond Hotel after reopening in 2014

- Location within Florida
- Location: 7301 Biscayne Boulevard, Miami, Florida
- Coordinates: 25°50′34″N 80°11′02″W
- Built: 1953
- Architect: Robert Swartburg
- NRHP reference No.: 14001086
- Added to NRHP: December 29, 2014

The Vagabond Motel is a historic motel located at 7301 Biscayne Boulevard in Miami, Florida that exhibits Miami Modern architecture. The building was listed on the National Register of Historic Places in late 2014 after being nominated by the state.

== History ==
The building was constructed in 1953 and was designed by Robert Swartburg. After sitting vacant for years, the building was reopened in 2014 as a restaurant and hotel.

Claims that the Vagabond Motel was once a hangout for Frank Sinatra and the Rat Pack are false. The Biscayne Times debunked those rumors in 2012. In the 1950s and 1960s, celebrities frequented the long-gone Vagabonds' Club in downtown Miami, not the middle-class family motel on the Upper East Side.

== Gallery ==
- Vagabond Motel Historical Landmark sign
- Vagabond Motel corner art (Miami)
- Vagabond Motel (Miami)
