= Florida State Road 856 =

Highway in Florida

State Road 856
- William Lehman Causeway
- SR 856 highlighted in red

Route information
- Maintained by FDOT
- Length: 1.704 mi (2.742 km)
- Existed: October 30, 1983 (causeway); 1993 (signed as state road)–present

Major junctions
- West end: US 1 in Aventura
- East end: SR A1A in Sunny Isles Beach

Location
- Country: United States
- State: Florida
- Counties: Miami-Dade

Highway system
- Florida State Highway System; Interstate; US; State; Former; Pre‑1945; Toll; Scenic
← SR 852	→ SR 858

State Road 856 (SR 856), also known as the William Lehman Causeway, is a 1.704-mile-long (2.742 km) causeway connecting Biscayne Boulevard (U.S. Route 1/SR 5) in Aventura and Collins Avenue (SR A1A) in Sunny Isles Beach, Florida.

SR 856 is a limited access highway between the two termini. Pedestrians are prohibited, but (as part of a pilot project that also includes the Pineda Causeway) the shoulder is marked as a bike lane east of the Country Club Drives interchange (cyclists must exit here and use other roads to continue west).

Northeast 192nd Street is a frontage road that starts and ends at County Club Drive and loops underneath the causeway. It carries the hidden state highway designation of State Road 856F.

== Route description ==
SR 856 begins at US 1 at the southwest corner of Aventura Mall in Aventura, and heads east, lining the southern border of the mall. At the southeast section of the mall, it passes over West Country Club Drive, featuring a Texas U-turn going westbound to eastbound on the frontage road, NE 192nd Street. Following access to and from the frontage roads, SR 856 passes by East Country Club Drive, featuring a Texas U-turn going eastbound to westbound. SR 856 then crosses the Intracoastal Waterway, passing close to high-rise condominiums and other housing. East of the waterway, the road enters Sunny Isles Beach and continues through the high rise and single family residential areas as it quickly hits its eastern terminus of SR A1A.

== History ==
The William Lehman Causeway was dedicated and opened to vehicular traffic on October 30, 1983. Named after William Lehman, a member of the United States House of Representatives who was instrumental in obtaining federal construction funds for the high-rise bridge, the Lehman Causeway is the most recent addition to Miami-Dade County's set of causeways crossing Biscayne Bay and the Intracoastal Waterway.

SR 856 was signed in 1993.

== Exit list ==
The entire route is in Miami-Dade County.

Location	mi	km	Destinations	Notes
Aventura	0.000	0.000	US 1 (Biscayne Boulevard)	
Aventura	0.8	1.3	Country Club Drives – Aventura Mall	Interchange
Atlantic Intracoastal Waterway	1.125– 1.611	1.811– 2.593		
Sunny Isles Beach	1.704	2.742	SR A1A (Collins Avenue)	Westbound entrance from SR A1A North is a flyover ramp
1.000 mi = 1.609 km; 1.000 km = 0.621 mi
