= Ecomb =

Nonprofit organization in Florida, U.S.

EcoMB
- Founded: 1994
- Type: 501(c)(3) not-for-profit
- Purpose: Environmentalism
- Location: Miami Beach, Florida
- Website: ecomb.org

EcoMB, originally named the Environmental Coalition of Miami and the Beaches, is a nonprofit environmental organization headquartered in Miami Beach, Florida. EcoMB was established in 1994 and is a registered 501(c)(3) organization. EcoMB's mission is to educate and promote environmental sustainability and ecological preservation in Florida and Miami-Dade County in particular. The organization lists four primary objectives - reduce litter on beaches, parks, mangroves, waterways and surrounding islands; increase rates of recycling; promote, preserve and restore local coastal habitats; and decrease the greater community's carbon footprint.

== Key personnel ==
- Luiz Rodrigues is the current Executive Director, since 2001
- Jeffrey Forster, President of The Board of Trustees
- Gabriole Van Bryce, Treasurer

== Monument Island Clean Up ==
Since the mid-1990s EcoMB organized clean up efforts for waste and refuse from Biscayne Bay accumulating on the Flagler Monument Island. In 2007 EcoMB officially "adopted" the island to keep it clean permanently, and since organizes monthly all volunteer community clean ups.

== Litter prevention ==
EcoMB has instituted a number of campaigns to help prevent litter and refuse from accumulating on the beach, hosting monthly beach sweeps, introducing artist designed litter bins on Miami-Dade County beaches and encouraging a county-wide adopt-a-beach program for businesses.

== Raising The Bar ==
Raise The Bar is a recycling program aimed at raising awareness and promoting recycling at restaurants, bars, nightclubs and lounges in the greater Miami and beaches neighborhoods. The program hosts recycling campaigns and drives at entertainment venues throughout the city to encourage the industry to recycle.

== Miami Beach Center For The Environment ==
In August 2010 it was announced that EcoMB had reached an agreement to partner with The City of Miami Beach to establish The Miami Beach Center For The Environment (MBCE), which will serve as the organizations headquarters, a public learning and environmental outreach center. The MBCE plans to install educational displays on the local environment, LEED building technology and landscaping showcases, demonstration areas, and a community recycling drop off. The MBCE hopes to begin renovation and restoration of the property throughout 2011 and is aiming to become the first LEED accredited building in the City of Miami Beach.

The MBCE has gained widespread local praise in the community with local politicians, current City Commissioner Michael Gongora, architect Chad Oppenheim, developer and entrepreneur Ken Fields and many more pledging their support.
