= Olympia Theater (Miami) =

Historic theater in Miami, Florida

- Miami's Original Performing Arts Center
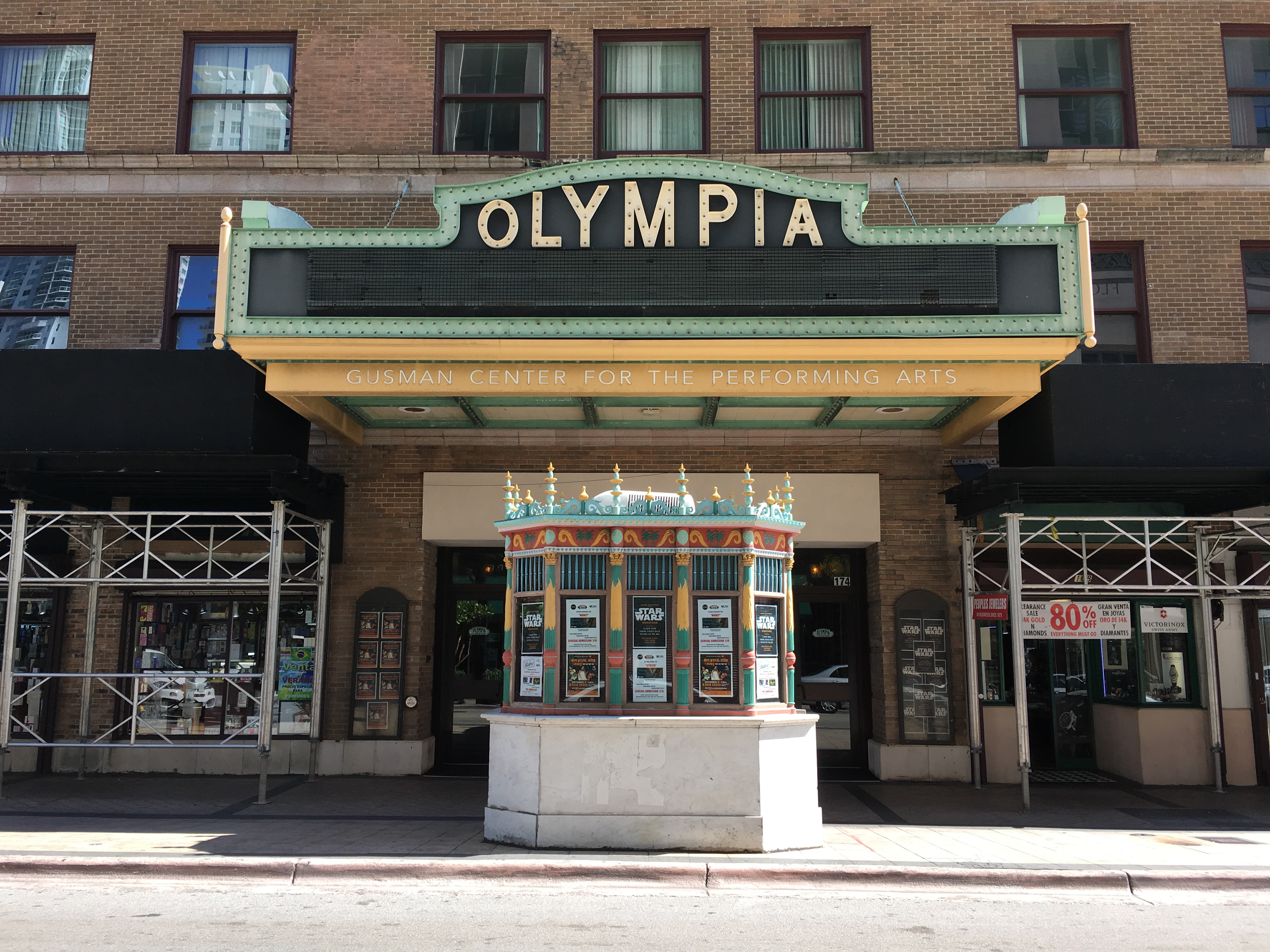
- Exterior of venue (2016)
- Interactive map of Olympia Theater
- Former names: Olympia Theater (2003-21); Gusman Center for the Performing Arts (1978-2003); Olympia Theater & Office Building (1926-78)
- Address: 174 E Flagler St; Miami, FL 33131-1130
- Location: Downtown Miami
- Owner: City of Miami
- Operator: City of Miami
- Capacity: 1,567 (2012-present); 1,710 (1977-2012); 2,170 (1926-77)

Construction
- Groundbreaking: May 27, 1925
- Opened: February 18, 1926
- Renovated: 1972, 1975-77, 1989-96, 2000-02, 2009-12
- Closed: 1970-72, 1989-96
- Cost: 1.5 million ($28.2 million in 2025 dollars)
- Architect: John Eberson
- General contractor: George A. Fuller Company

Tenant
- Greater Miami Philharmonic Orchestra (1972-82)

Website
- Venue Website
- Building details

General information
- Renovated: 2009-12
- Renovation cost: $12.2 million ($18.3 million in 2025 dollars)

Renovating team
- Architect: RJ Heisenbottle Architects
- Structural engineer: Maurice Gray & Associates
- Services engineer: Gartek Engineering
- Civil engineer: Wiss, Janney, Elstner Associates, Inc.
- Main contractor: Trigram GC
- Olympia Theater and Office Building
- U.S. National Register of Historic Places
- Location: Miami, FL
- Coordinates: 25°46′27.12″N 80°11′25.8606″W
- Built: 1925-26
- Architect: John Eberson
- Architectural style: Mediterranean Revival
- NRHP reference No.: 84000839
- Added to NRHP: March 8, 1984

The Olympia Theater is a theater located in Miami, Florida. Designed by John Eberson in his famed atmospheric style, the theater opened in 1926. Throughout its history, the venue has served as a movie theater, concert venue and performing arts center. In 1984, it received historical designation by the NRHP. The Olympia Theatre, the Florida Theatre, the Polk Theatre, and the Tampa Theatre are the only remaining atmospheric theatres in Florida.

== Background ==
In 1924, Paramount Enterprises, Inc. commissioned a theater in the South Florida area. Cities chosen for consideration were: Fort Lauderdale, Miami, Tampa and Sarasota. Architect John Eberson was hired to design the theater, after the success of his work with the Majestic Theatre in Dallas, Texas. Blueprints were completed in December 1924. Miami was chosen as the city and the theater was built on the site of the former "Airdome", an open-air movie theater.

Construction began in May 1925 for the "Miami Theatre and Office Building". Eberson designed the theater to replicate a Spanish garden. The venue was completed in January 1926. The venue was renamed the "Olympia Theater and Office Building" by the wife of the land owner, Mrs. A.E. Rickmers. The name was changed to match its Mediterranean design style. The theater opened on February 18, 1926 as a silent movie theater.

As the movie entertainment changed, so did the purpose of the theater. By 1929, talking pictures and vaudeville grew in popularity. The theater began to host many acts including the Marx Brothers and Gypsy Rose Lee. By the 1950s, the theater hosted numerous concerts. The theater gained notoriety after 15 sold-out performances by Elvis Presley in August 1956. The 50s and 60s saw performances from Etta James, Della Reese and B.B. King.

By the late 1960s, the use of the theater declined. Plans were underway to demolish the theater and convert the space into a parking lot. In 1970, the venue was purchased by businessman and philanthropist, Maurice Gusman. He later hired famed local architect, Morris Lapidus to renovated the main auditorium. The capacity was reduced from 2,000 to 1,700. In 1972, the renovated theater became the home of the Greater Miami Philharmonic Orchestra.

In 1975, Gusman donated the property to the City of Miami. Renovations continued on the theater from 1975 to 1977. The former movie palace was converted to a rock concert venue and named the "Gusman Cultural Center". With the new era, the theater hosted concerts by Jimmy Buffett, The Police, Molly Hatchet, Devo and Supertramp.

In 1984, the theater was listed on the National Register of Historic Places. However, the theater faced another decline in the late 80s. This time, plans included converting the property into a retail space. The Gusman Estate moved against the changes and created a non-profit organization, the Friends of Gusman, to help create funds to improve the aging building. Renovations began in 1989 to convert the former rock venue into a performing arts center. The theater reopened in 1994. The theater changed names once again to the "Gusman Center for the Performing Arts". The venue continued to concerts by the Florida Philharmonic (defunct), Annie Lennox, Luciano Pavarotti and Johnny Cash.

In 2000, restoration work began on the theater's original artwork. Also, plans were underway to repair the building's structure and exterior frame. The venue had a grand reopening in October 2002, under the name the "Olympia Theater at the Gusman Center for the Performing Arts". In 2009, another rounds of renovations began to repair the stage, acoustics, HVAC systems, replace seating and restore the original Olympia marquee. Capacity was reduced from 1,700 to 1,500.

In 2010, the Olympia Center, Inc. was formed to manage and operate the venue. The team works with various promotion companies including AEG Live, Shock Entertainment, the Rhythm Foundation and Poplife. In 2014, the venue changed to its original name, "Olympia Theater". Concerts included Bryan Adams, Kraftwerk and Damien Rice.

The cost and effort of maintaining a COVID-19 pandemic shuttered venue with major capital needs and urgent repairs was not sustainable. The Board of Directors and Executive Staff faced the difficult decision to return management and operation of the historic Olympia Theater & Office Building to the City of Miami in 2020.

== Significance ==
On April 18, 2012, the American Institute of Architects's Florida Chapter placed the building on its list of Florida Architecture: 100 Years. 100 Places as the Olympia Theater at the Gusman Center for the Performing Arts.
