= Anastasia Samoylova =

Russian-born American artist

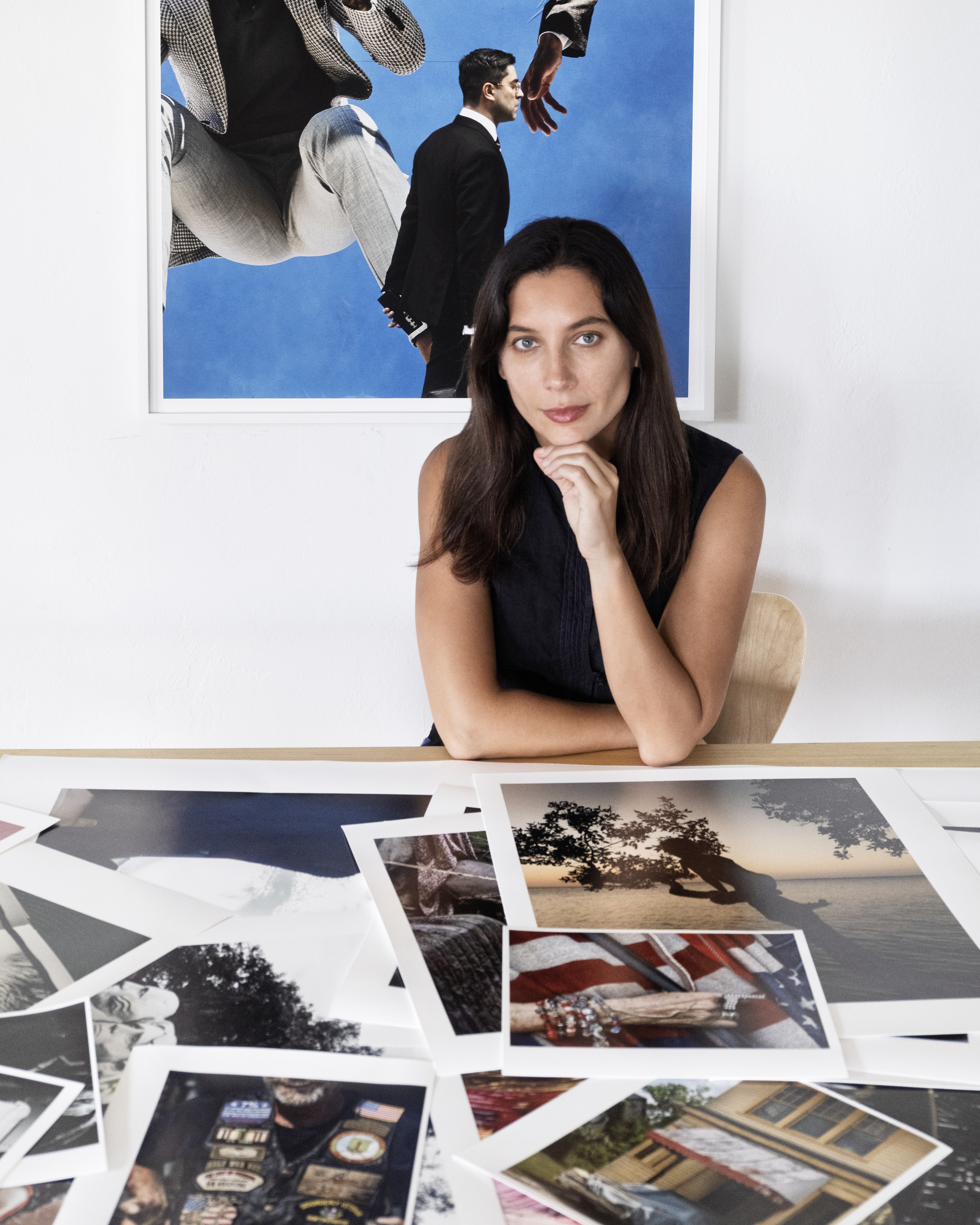
- Samoylova in 2024
- Born: 1984 (age 41–42); Moscow, Russia
- Citizenship: Russian; American
- Education: MA Russian State University for the Humanities; MFA Bradley University
- Occupations: Photographer; visual artist
- Awards: Fundación MAPFRE

Anastasia Samoylova (born in 1984, Moscow) is a Russian-born American artist working through documentary and studio photography on landscape and environmental research such as sea level rise in South Florida.

== Education and early life ==
Born in the Soviet Union in the 1980s, she relocated to Miami Beach, Florida, in 2016, where her visual investigation FloodZone started to develop.

She holds a master's degree from Russian State University for the Humanities, Moscow, Russia (2007), and an MFA from Bradley University (2011), in Peoria, Illinois.

== Work ==
Anastasia Samoylova's work investigate changes in the landscape of coastal cities in the United States and beyond. Her work is mainly focused on South Florida, where she is based, and Miami Beach architectural landmarks such as the Shore Apartments take part in her artistic oeuvre.

Recent presentations of Samoylova's work were exhibited at the Metropolitan Museum of Art, New York; C/O Berlin, Germany; Fundación MAPFRE, Spain; George Eastman Museum, New York; Chrysler Museum of Art, Virginia; The Photographers’ Gallery, London; and Kunst Haus Wien, Austria, among others.

Her work has been featured in publications such as The New Yorker, Wired, and Foam. She was granted artistic residences at Latitute Chicago, in 2015, and at Oolite Arts, in Miami between 2018 and 2019.

In 2021, the film Playtime by French filmmaker Jacques Tati, sparked her interest in developing the photographic project Image Cities, which covers traveling and photographing 17 cities across the globe. The selection criteria was based on the Globalization and World Cities Research Network (GaWC) list, which highlights urban and economic centers around the world. Among the cities were London, New York, Paris, Tokyo, Los Angeles, Amsterdam, Toronto, Milan, Frankfurt, Mexico City, Madrid, Brussels, Moscow, and others.

The exhibition FloodZone was presented at the Chrysler Museum of Art, Virginia, and at the George Eastman Museum in Rochester, New York, in 2022.

In 2024, The Albin O. Kuhn Library Gallery at the University of Maryland, Baltimore County, presented a traveling iteration of Anastasia Samoylova: FloodZone, a major career survey to date including over forty artworks by Samoylova. The exhibition touches on climate crisis and environmental concerns through landscape photographic imagery.

The Metropolitan Museum of Art organized a two-person show in its 2024-2025 exhibition Floridas: Anastasia Samoylova and Walker Evans featuring Samoylova's work and Walker Evans photographs. The exhibition research and visual relation between both artists expanded into a publication launched in 2022 and published by Thames and Hudson.

== Personal life ==
Samoylova became an American citizen in 2021.

== Collections ==
Samoylova's work is included in US-based and international museum collections such as the Pérez Art Museum Miami, Florida; High Museum of Art in Atlanta, Georgia; and the Museum of Contemporary Photography in Chicago, Illinois.

== Awards and honors ==
In 2022, Anastasia Samoylova was shortlisted for the German award Deutsche Börse Photography Foundation Prize. She was the 2023 winner of the KBr Photo Award by Fundación MAPFRE, Spain.

== Publications ==
- Flood Zone (2019). Göttingen: Steidl. ISBN 978-3958296336.
- Anastasia Samoylova & Walker Evans: Floridas (2022). Göttingen: Steidl. ISBN 978-3969990070.
- Anastasia Samoylova: Image Cities (2023). Berlin: Hatje Cantz. ISBN 978-3-7757-5480-4
- Anastasia Samoylova (2024). Thames & Hudson. ISBN 9780500027189.
