= Collins Park, Miami Beach =

Neighborhood in Miami Beach, Florida, United States

Coordinates: 25.797°N 80.130°W

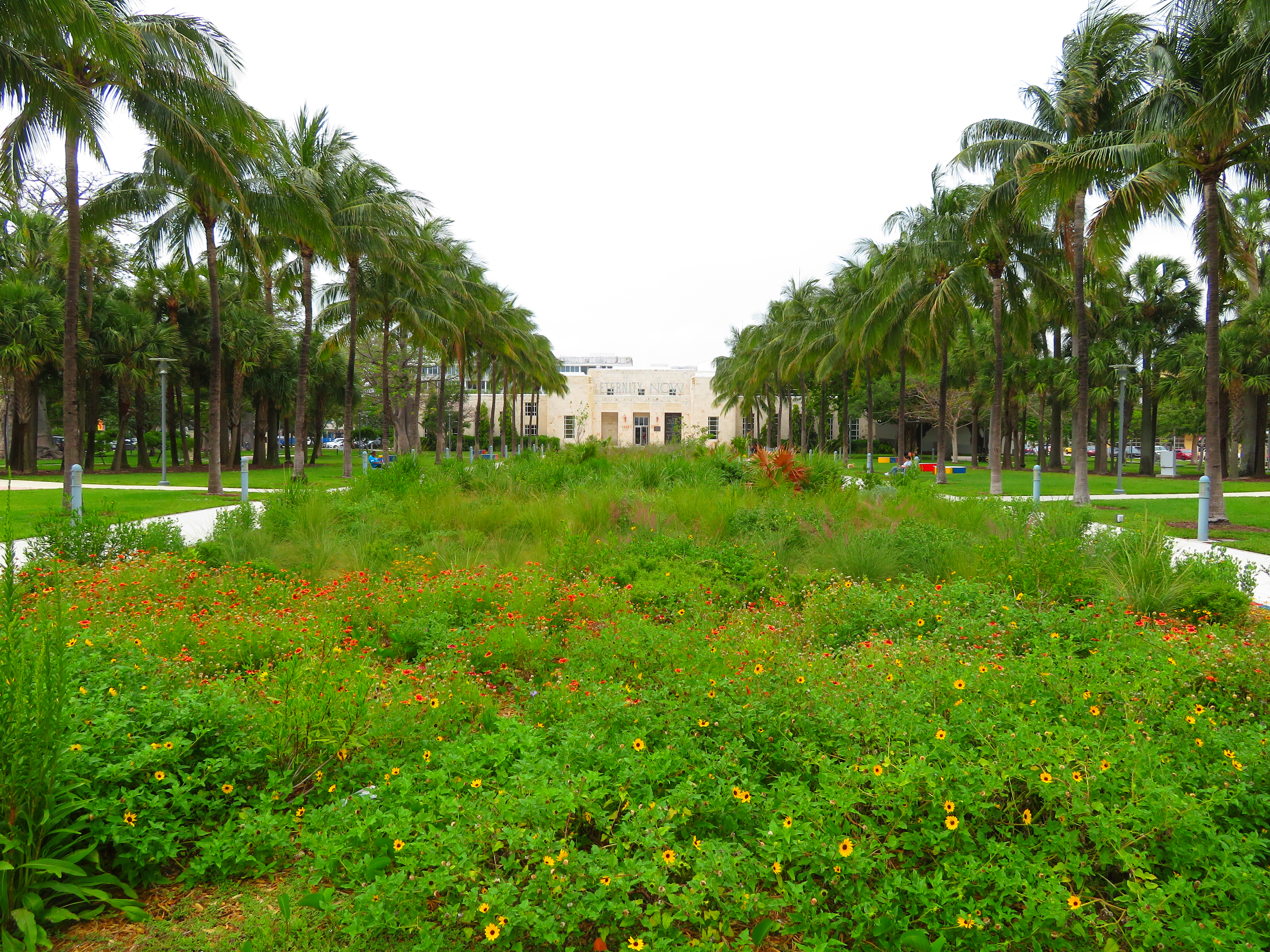
Collins Park

The Collins Park Neighborhood in Miami Beach sits on the north eastern point of the South Beach Historic District. Its boundaries are 17th street to the south, 25th Street to the north, the Atlantic Ocean to the east and Washington Avenue, Dade County Boulevard and Pinetree Drive to the west.

The neighborhood is widely recognized as the cultural center of Miami Beach, hosting such institutions as The Bass Museum of Art, The Miami City Ballet, The SoBe Music Institute, The Holocaust Memorial, the Miami Design and Preservation League and most recently has seen the creation of the CANDO Art's Co-op. Due to the neighborhoods parks and relative proximity to the Miami Beach Convention Center, Collins Park is also a natural flow over for Art Basel Miami events and satellite exhibitions such as Design Miami.

Even though the neighborhood is located within the heart of the city, development of Collins Park has lagged behind the South Beach area just south. Private efforts in the late 1990s to redevelop the neighborhood met with resistance from the City of Miami Beach as expansions were planned for the Bass Museum and the ballet. In the early 2000s another neighborhood revitalization effort was made by private developers – most notably Ken Fields (The Creek South Beach), Alessandro Ferretti (Articity), The W Condo-Hotel and The Gansevoort/Perry.

The neighborhood which has become a major thoroughfare for traffic coming in to the beach from the mainland was to have a parking garage designed by Zaha Hadid, however when the costs were almost double the allocated budget, the City voted against the project.

== See also ==
- Bass Museum
- Miami City Ballet
- Miami Modern Architecture
- Miami Beach Architectural District
