= Miami Modern architecture =

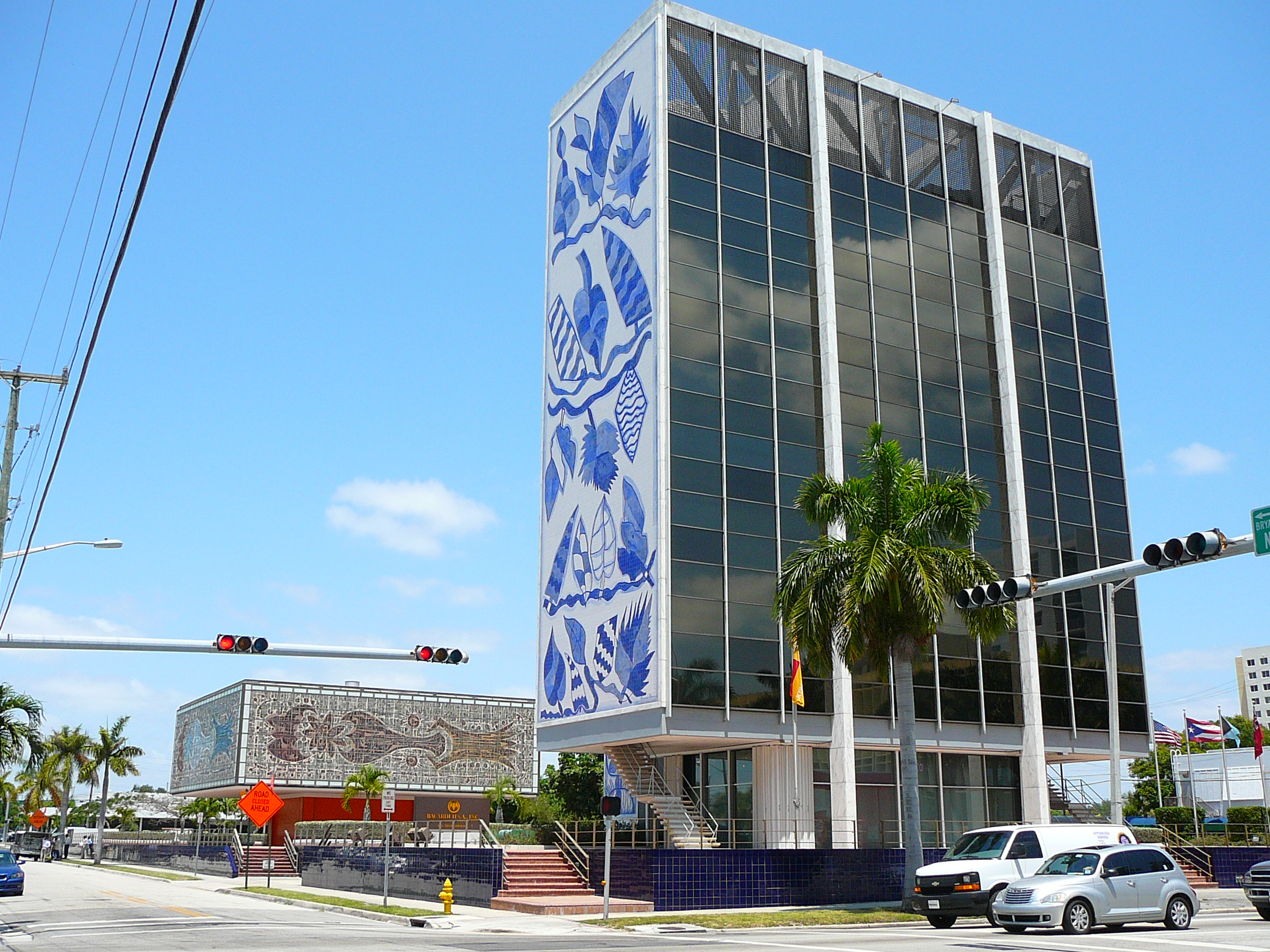
The Bacardi Building, built in 1963 in Edgewater, is an example of MiMo architecture.

Miami Modernist architecture, or MiMo, is a regional style of architecture that developed in South Florida during the post-war period. The style was internationally recognized as a regionalist response to the International Style. It can be seen in most of the larger Miami and Miami Beach resorts built after the Great Depression. Because MiMo styling was not just a response to international architectural movements but also to client demands, themes of glamour, fun, and material excess were added to otherwise stark, minimalist, and efficient styles of the era. MiMo can be described as having decorative breeze blocks, smooth corners, flat roofs, the use of glass, and an overall tropical aesthetic. The style can be most observed today in Middle and Upper Miami Beach along Collins Avenue, as well as along the Biscayne Boulevard corridor starting from around Midtown, through the Design District and into the Upper Eastside.

== History ==
MiMo took shape between 1945 and 1960, when postwar economic growth and a new American middle class transformed South Florida. Car ownership spread, commercial air travel became affordable, and Miami saw a surge of tourists. Hotels, motels, and vacation apartments went up quickly to meet the demand.Art Deco had been the dominant style in Miami Beach through the 1930s and 1940s, but by the late 1940s, modernist design had largely taken its place.The roots of MiMo go back to the 1930s, when local architects began blending elements of the International Style, Streamline Moderne, and Art Deco into something new.

The term MiMo has only recently been associated with the style. Popularity of the term is credited to Miami Beach resident Randall C. Robinson and interior designer Teri D'Amico. Principal examples of MiMo include the Fontainebleau Hotel, Eden Roc, Seacoast Towers, Deauville, and Di Lido hotels by famed architect Morris Lapidus; Norman Giller's Carillon Hotel, which was voted Miami Beach's "Hotel of the Year" in 1959; and the original Diplomat Hotel in Hollywood, Florida. Giller designed numerous hotels that added many stylish characteristics to Miami, even describing it as "light", "floating", and "whimsy." Giller's designs gave Miami some architectural identity during a rapid growth of tourism after the war. These designs were climate-ready with relaxing designs. This kind of modernism was just what the public needed after World War II, and it is what drew so many tourists towards the city.

To some degree, Miami developed the style through the work of younger architects immediately after the war; they were more closely aligned with media promotions and sensationalism than older architects of the era. A book regarding the architecture of Miami, “A guide to the architecture of Miami”, touches on how its style should represent its culture, stating that it must have “its own expression of the culture it serves” This kind of expression helped MiMo stand out from other styles of architecture while cementing its tropical and leisurely nature.

== Characteristics ==
MiMo buildings share several recurring features: interior gardens, open-air walkways connecting apartment units, symmetrical staircases, and facades decorated with cornices, brick, stone, or perforated breeze blocks that let air pass through for natural ventilation. Straight lines and sharp angles sit next to curves and circular cutouts, sometimes on the same building. Glass is used heavily, with large windows and full glass walls that blur the line between inside and outside and let in South Florida's natural light.

Architectural historians have identified two strains of the style. Resort MiMo is the flashier variety, tied to the grand hotels of Miami Beach. It borrowed from Hollywood set design, automobile styling, and the space race, producing sharp angles, boomerang shapes, and trapezoidal forms. Subtropical Modernism, the other strain, took modernist ideas and applied them to houses, apartment complexes, and civic buildings designed around Miami's climate. Both versions mixed the clean geometry of the broader modern movement with a sense of playfulness and, at times, outright extravagance.

== Historic Districts ==
The area along Biscayne Boulevard is now the designated "MiMo Biscayne Boulevard Historic District" or more uniquely named "MiMo on BiBo", for "Miami Modern on Biscayne Boulevard". MiMo Historic District runs roughly from 50th Street to 77th Street along Biscayne Boulevard, although MiMo can be found in the Design District and Midtown. Many annual festivals are held to promote MiMo architecture, such as "Cinco de MiMo" a play on "Cinco de Mayo" in early May. The area is bounded by the Little River to the north, Bay Point Estates to the south, the Florida East Coast Railway to the west, and Biscayne Bay to the east.

Because of their architectural and cultural worth, preservationists advocate for the protection of MiMo buildings around North Beach. These efforts aim to protect not only the physical architecture, but its historical importance as well. Thanks to preservation efforts, tourism, and historical protection, MiMo has become greatly valued. Characteristics like its breeze blocks and tropical style are considered vital to Miami's identity. In January 2018, the Miami Beach city commission voted unanimously to give more than 250 modernist buildings in North Beach protection from demolition. It was the largest expansion of local historic protections in the area in decades.

== Gallery ==
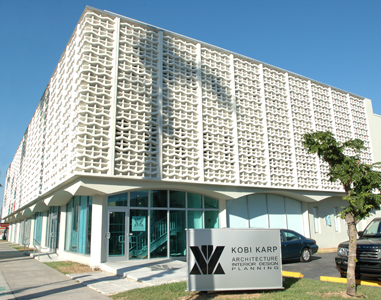
Kobi Karp offices along Miami's Biscayne Boulevard

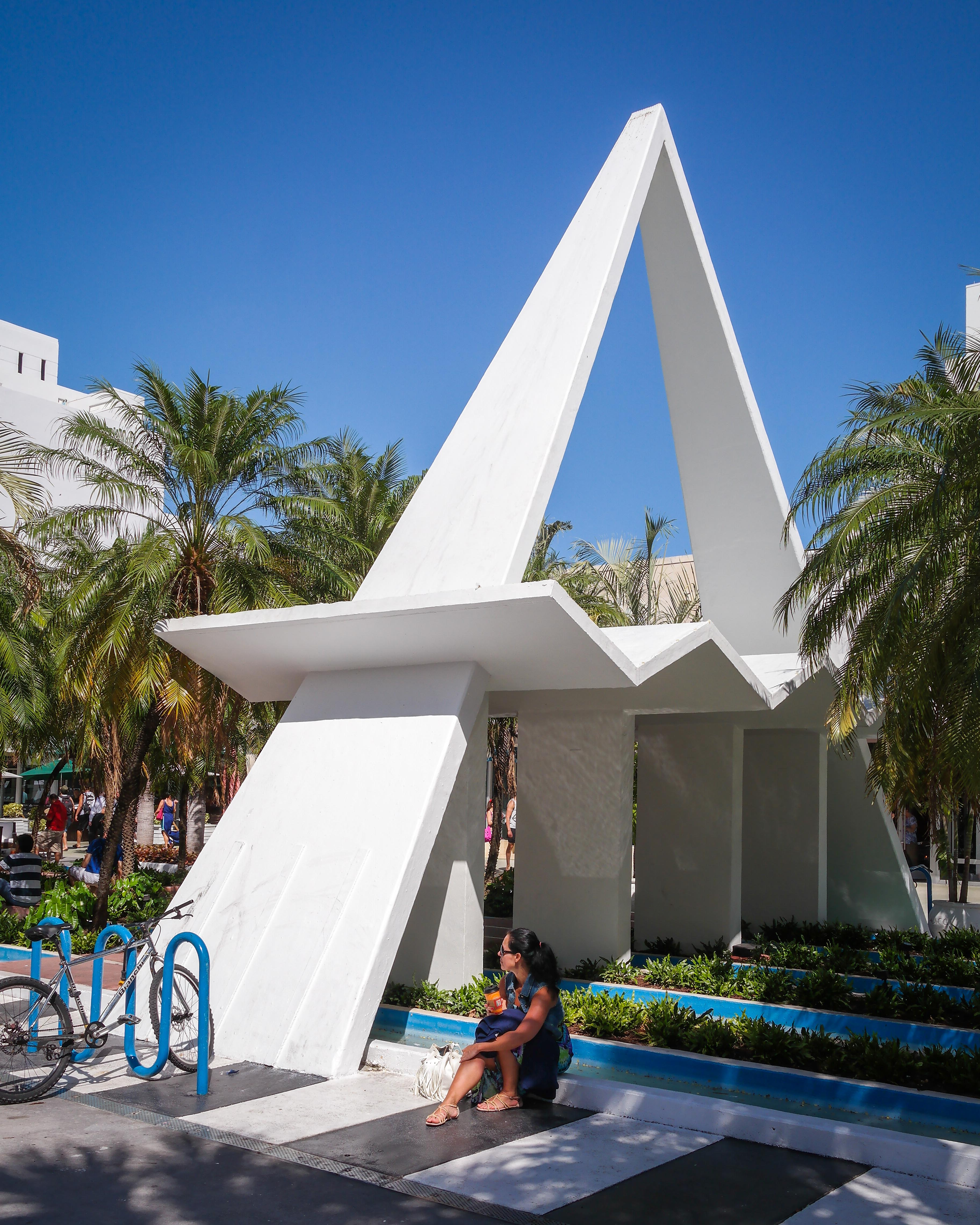
MiMo architectural follies on Lincoln Road

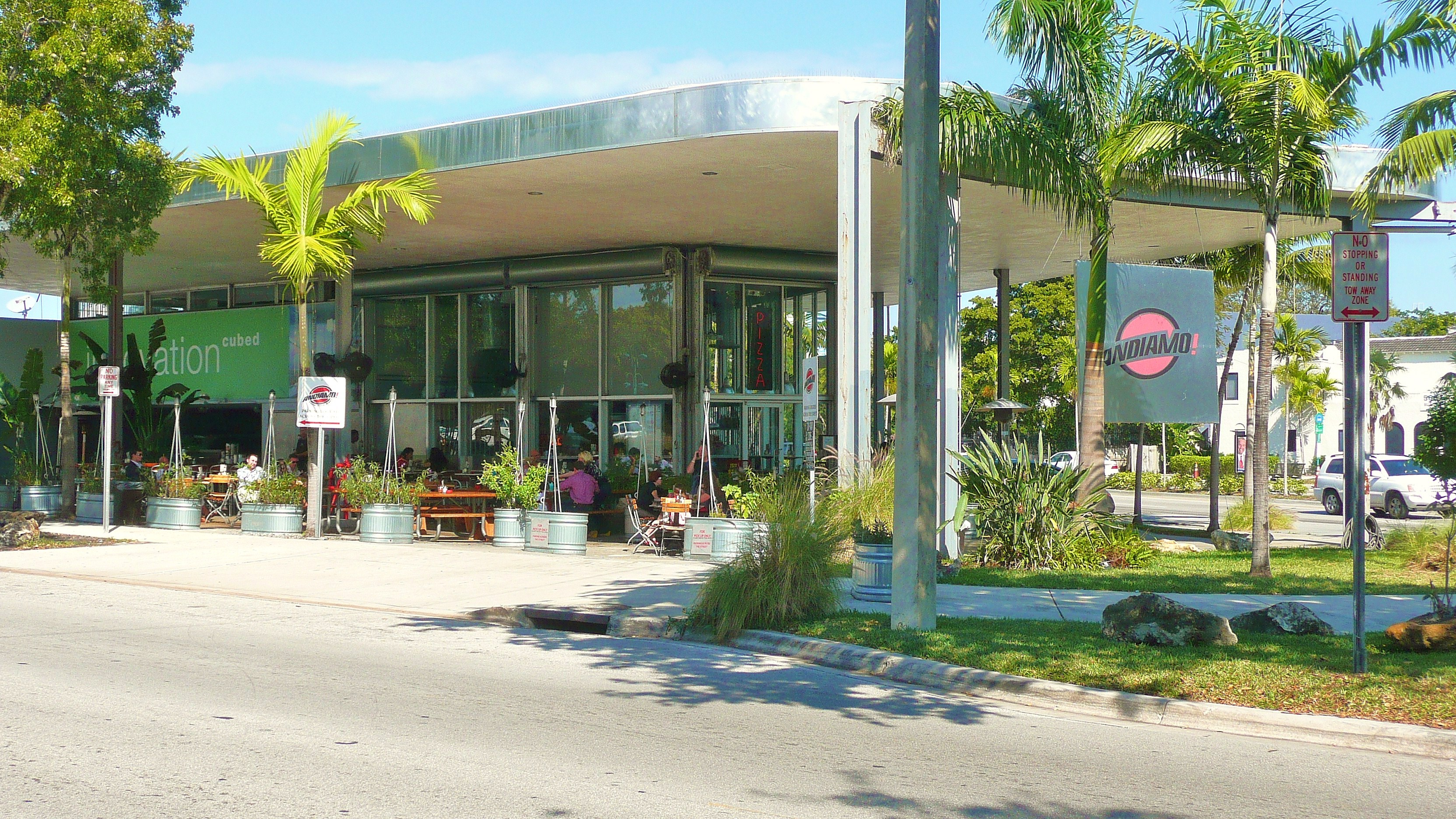
Restaurant in the MiMo District

== Partial list of MiMo buildings ==
Bay Harbor Islands, Florida

- Coral Sea Towers (Carlos B. Schoeppl, 1956) - 10300 W Bay Harbor Drive, Bay Harbor Islands

Doral

- Pepsi-Cola Bottling Pavilion (Daverman & Associates c: 1965) – 7777 NW 41st Street

Miami

- Biscayne Plaza Shopping Center (Robert Fitch Smith, 1953) – 7900 Biscayne Boulevard
- Dupont Plaza Center (Petersen & Shuflin, 1957) – 300 Biscayne Boulevard Way (demolished in 2004 to give way to the EPIC Miami Residences and Hotel).
- Gold Dust, 7700 Biscayne Blvd
- Miami Herald (Naess & Murphy, 1960) – One Herald Plaza (Demolished Aug 2014 – Feb 2015)
- New Yorker Boutique Hotel (Norman Giller, 1953) – 6500 Biscayne Boulevard
- Shalimar Motel (Edwin Reeder, 1950) – 6200 Biscayne Boulevard
- Sinbad Motel (1953) – 6150 Biscayne Boulevard
- South Pacific Motel (1953) – 6300 Biscayne Boulevard
- Temple Menorah
- Thunderbird Motel (Norman Giller, 1955) – 18401 Collins Avenue
- Union Planters Bank (Francis Hoffman, 1958) – 1133 Normandy Drive
- Vagabond Motel (Robert Swartburg, 1953) – 7301 Biscayne Boulevard (Reopened as the Vagabond Hotel in 2013)

Miami Beach

- The Creek South Beach Motel (Originally Ankara Motel) (Reiff & Feldman, 1954) – 2360 Collins Avenue
- Crystal House (Morris Lapidus, 1960) – 5055 Collins Avenue
- Deco Palm Apartments (Gilbert Fein, 1958) – 6930 Rue Versailles
- Deauville Beach Resort, (demolished in 2022)
- Imperial House (Melvin Grossman, 1963) – 5255 Collins Avenue
- International Inn (Melvin Grossman, 1956) – 2301 Normandy Drive, Normandy Isle
- Jackie Gleason House (Lester Avery, 1959) – 2232 Alton Road
- Lincoln Road Mall (Morris Lapidus, 1960)
- Miami Beach Bandshell (1961 by Norman Giller and Associates) 7275 Collins Ave - North Beach, Miami Beach
- King Cole Condominium (Melvin Grossman, 1961) – 900 Bay Dr.
- Royal York Hotel (1950), 5875 Collins Avenue (demolished prior to 2004)

== See also ==
- Miami Design District
- Googie architecture
- Midtown Miami
- Upper Eastside
- Wildwoods Shore Resort Historic District
- Normandy Isles Historic District
