= Maurice Gusman =

American investor (1889–1980)

- Born: 1889; Russian Empire
- Died: April 4, 1980 (aged 90–91); Miami, Florida, U.S.
- Occupations: Investor, banker, real estate developer, philanthropist
- Spouse: Hannah Gusman

Maurice Gusman (1889 – April 4, 1980) was a Russian-born American millionaire investor and philanthropist. Gusman emigrated to the United States at the age of 14 and became a millionaire by the age of 32 as a real estate developer.

== History ==
Born in the Russian Empire into a Jewish family, Gusman immigrated to the United States at the age of 14 alone. Gusman began working at the age of 13 to save money for his ticket to the United States and never had a formal education. Gusman arrived in New York through Ellis Island and spent several years on the Lower East Side of Manhattan, working at a drugstore. Within three years of arrival to the United States, he opened his own store but lost it in the Panic of 1907. He moved to Akron, Ohio to open another store and made millions in the rubber industry.

Gusman became a millionaire by the age of 32. In 1947, he moved to Miami with his family and began his real estate investment and development.

In 1948, Gusman purchased the Olympia Theater, renovated it and gave it to the City of Miami in 1975. He donated $2.5 mln to the University of Miami for the building of the concert hall that opened on January 31, 1975 at the Frost School of Music.
