= Florida Philharmonic Orchestra (1956–1982) =

The Miami Philharmonic Orchestra was an American symphony orchestra based in Miami, Florida. The orchestra began as the University of Miami Symphony Orchestra, and was also known as the Greater Miami Philharmonic Orchestra.

Fabien Sevitzky was the first music director of the orchestra, after his 1959 move to Miami and through his sudden death in 1967. Alain Lombard was the orchestra's next music director, from 1967 to 1975. Lombard left the orchestra after disputes with the philanthropist Maurice Gusman, who had been instrumental in establishing Lombard's initial career with the orchestra.

The orchestra later changed its name to the Florida Philharmonic Orchestra (not to be confused with a later orchestra founded in 1985 sharing the same name.) The orchestra folded in 1982 following extensive labor disputes.
