= Normandy Isles Historic District =

Historic district in Florida, United States

- U.S. National Register of Historic Places
- U.S. Historic district
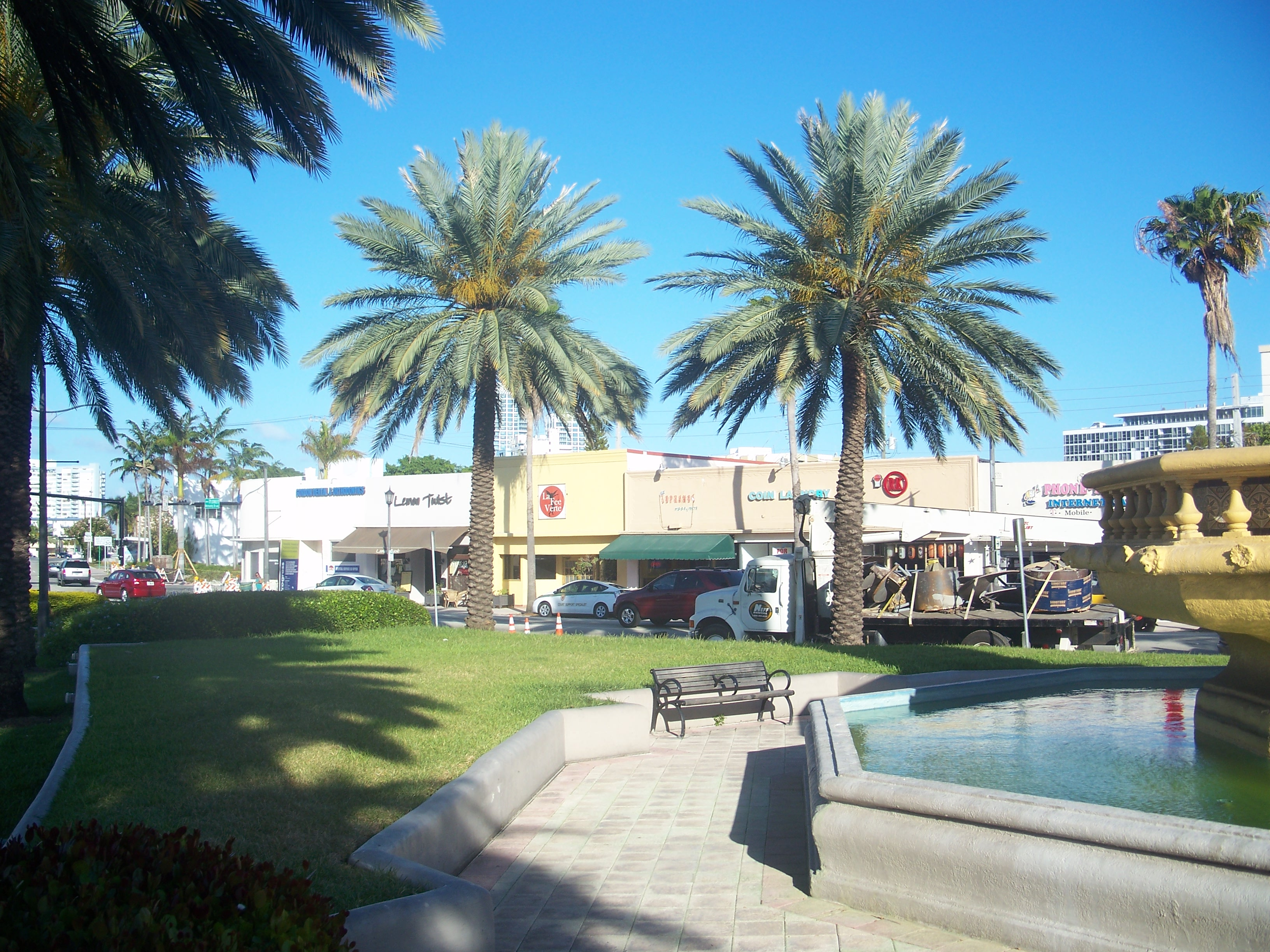

- Location within Miami Location within Florida Location within the United States
- Location: Miami Beach, Florida, U.S.
- Coordinates: 25°51′16.4″N 80°7′51.7″W
- NRHP reference No.: 08001041
- Added to NRHP: November 12, 2008

Normandy Isles Historic District is a U.S. Historic District encompassing the Normandy Isles neighborhood of Miami Beach, Florida. It is roughly bounded by the Normandy Shores Golf Course, Indian Creek, Biscayne Bay, Rue Versailles, 71st Street, and Rue Notre Dame. On November 12, 2008, it was added to the U.S. National Register of Historic Places.
