= Collins Avenue =

Road in Miami-Dade, Florida

Coordinates: 25.8622148°N 80.1210712°W

- A1A Scenic and Historic Coastal Highway
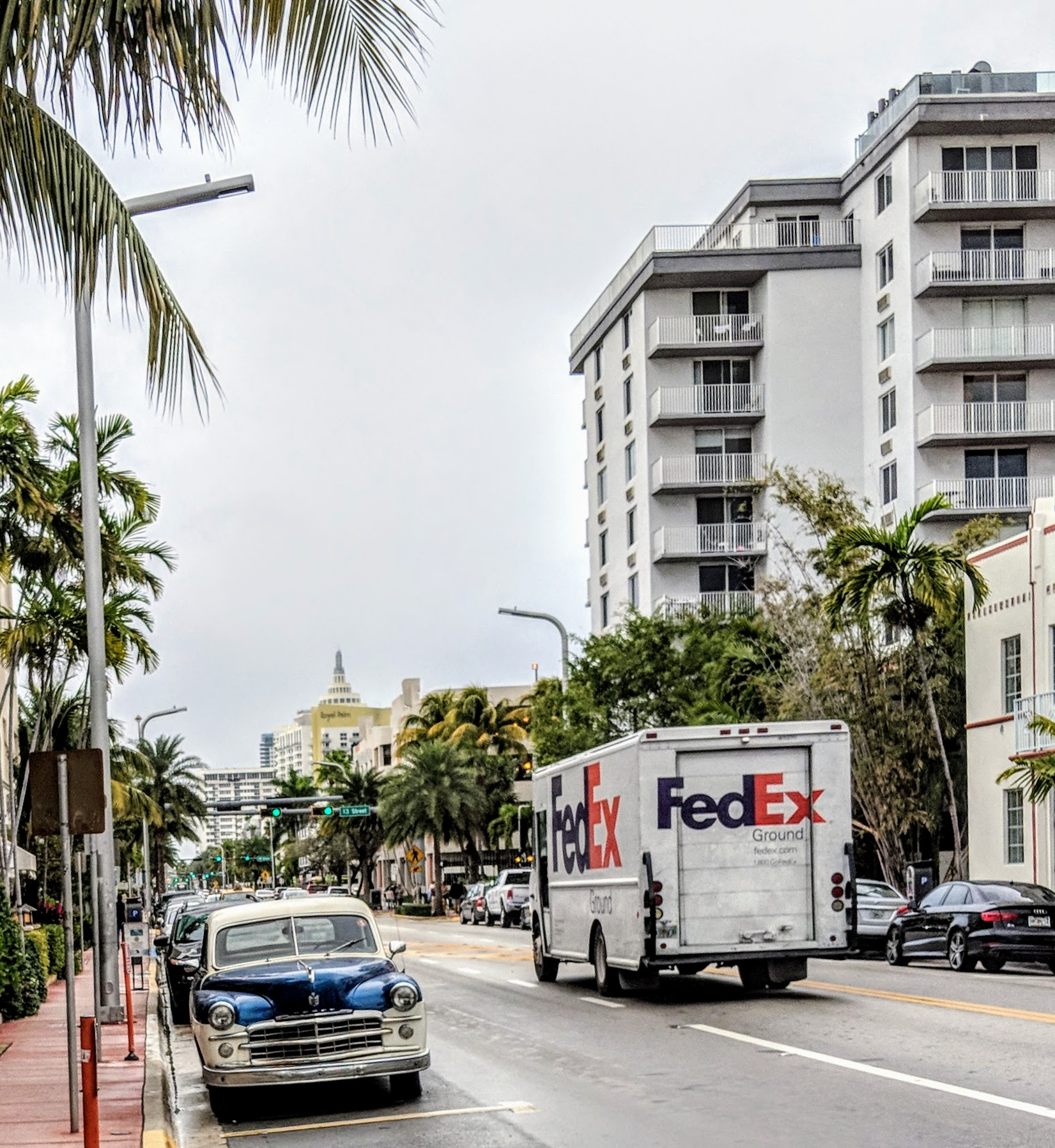
- View of Collins Boulevard in South Beach
- Interactive map of Collins Avenue
- Type: SR
- Maintained by: FDOT
- Length: 13.1 mi (21.1 km)
- Location: Miami-Dade
- South end: South Pointe Drive in Miami Beach
- North end: SR 856 (William Lehman Causeway) / SR A1A in Sunny Isles Beach

Construction
- Inauguration: 1945 renumbering (definition)

Collins Avenue, partly co-signed State Road A1A, is a major thoroughfare in South Florida, United States. The road runs parallel to the Atlantic Ocean in Miami Beach, Florida, one block west. It also runs through the cities of Surfside and Sunny Isles Beach to the north. Collins Avenue was named for John S. Collins, a developer who, in 1913, completed Miami’s first bridge, Collins Bridge, connecting Miami Beach to the mainland across Biscayne Bay.

== Background ==
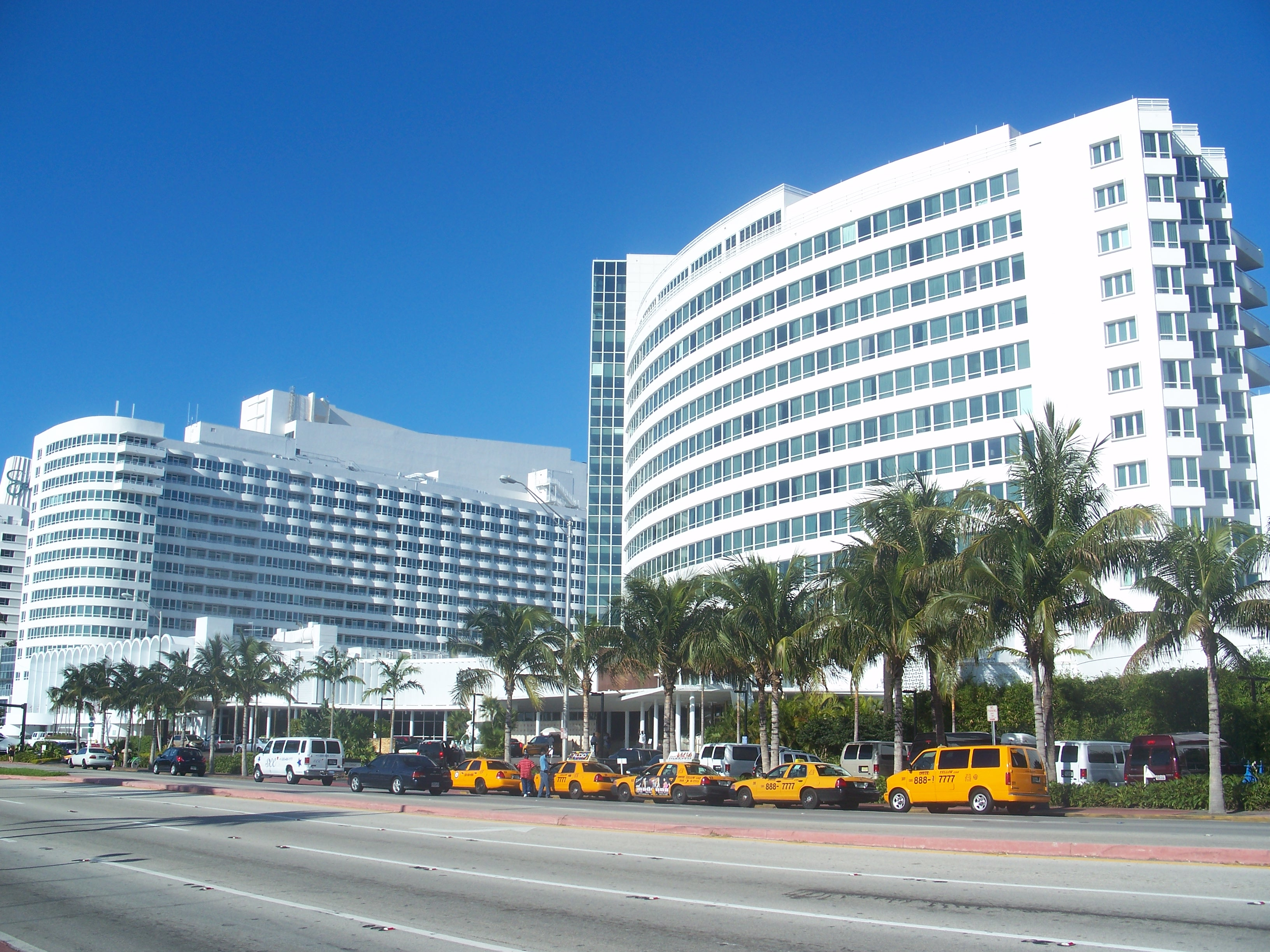
The Fontainebleau Hotel as seen from Collins Avenue

Collins Avenue is home to many historic Art Deco hotels, and several nightclubs to the north.

North of 41st Street this boulevard lies between the Atlantic Ocean and the Indian Creek, lined by palm trees, and famous hotels from the 1950s and 1960s such as the Eden Roc and the Morris Lapidus-designed Fontainebleau Hotel, built in the curvy, flamboyant Neo-baroque fashion that defined the 1950s "Miami Beach" resort hotel style.

== Significant events ==
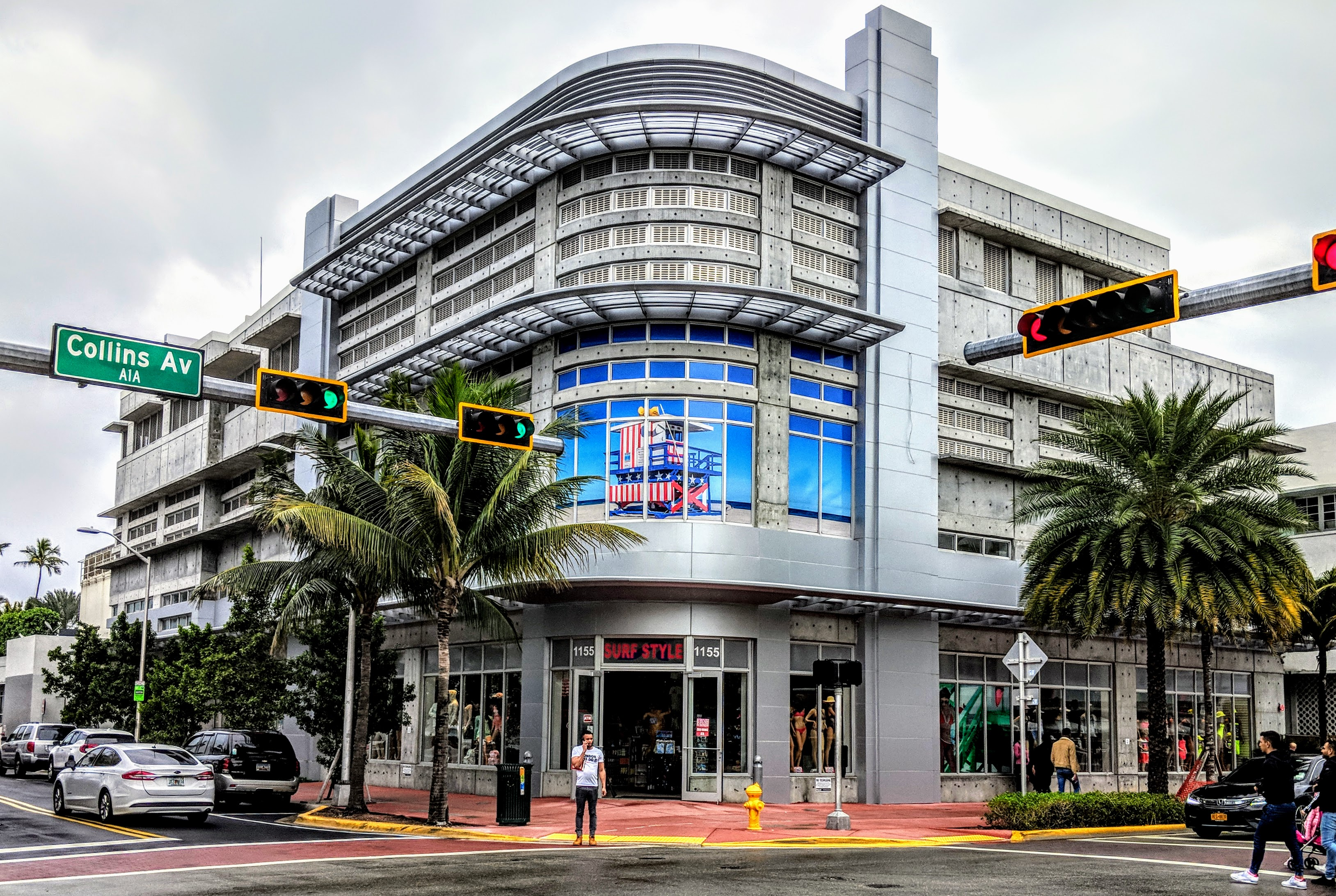
Collins Avenue in South Beach

The annual Miami International Boat Show occurs on Collins Avenue. On February 2, 1973, a mentally ill man firebombed a cafeteria at 1921 Collins Avenue in Miami Beach, killing three people and injuring over 130. On June 24, 2021, an apartment building at 8777 Collins Avenue in Surfside partially collapsed, resulting in 98 fatalities.
