= Miami Beach Architectural District =

U.S. historic district in Miami Beach, Florida

- U.S. National Register of Historic Places
- U.S. Historic district
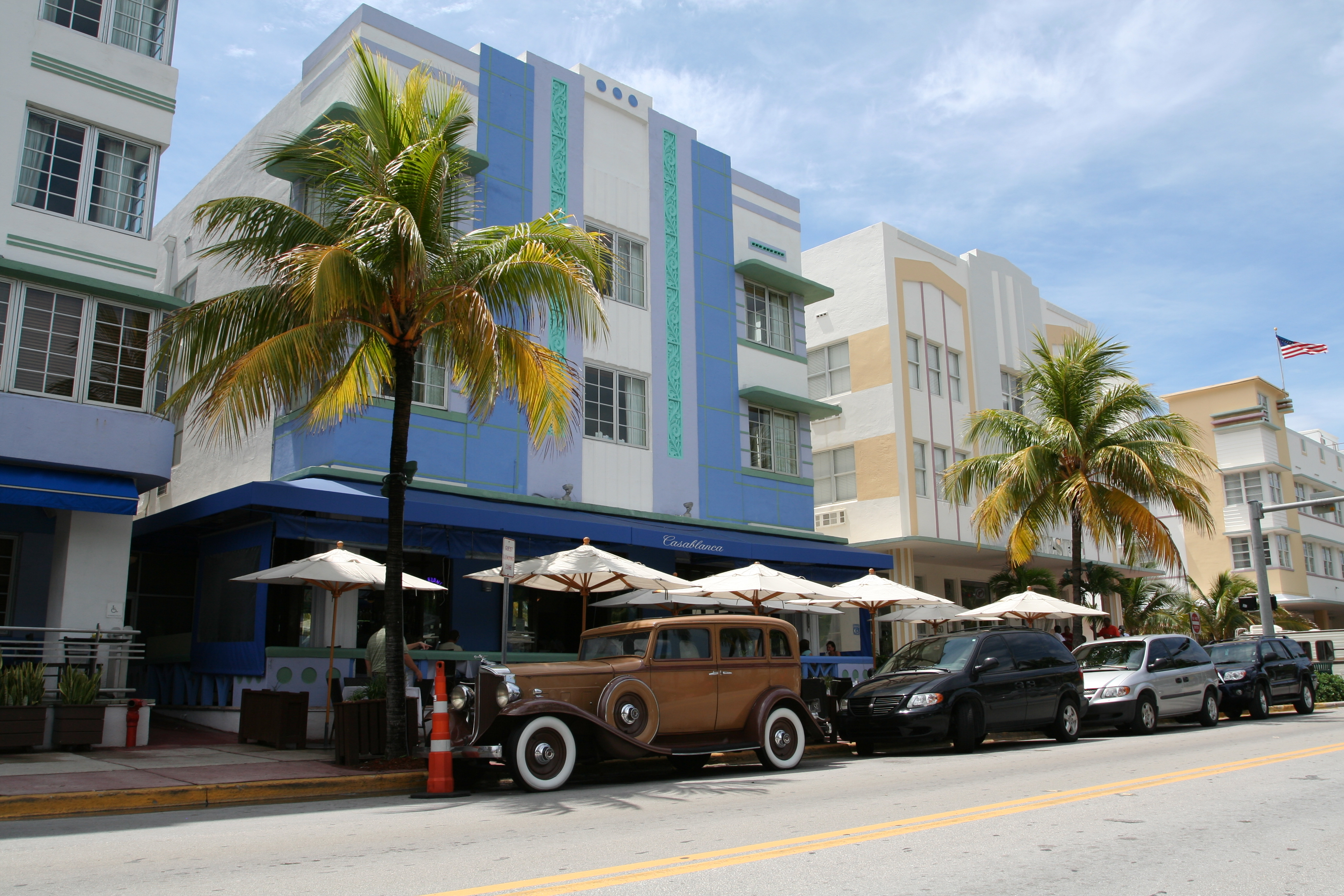

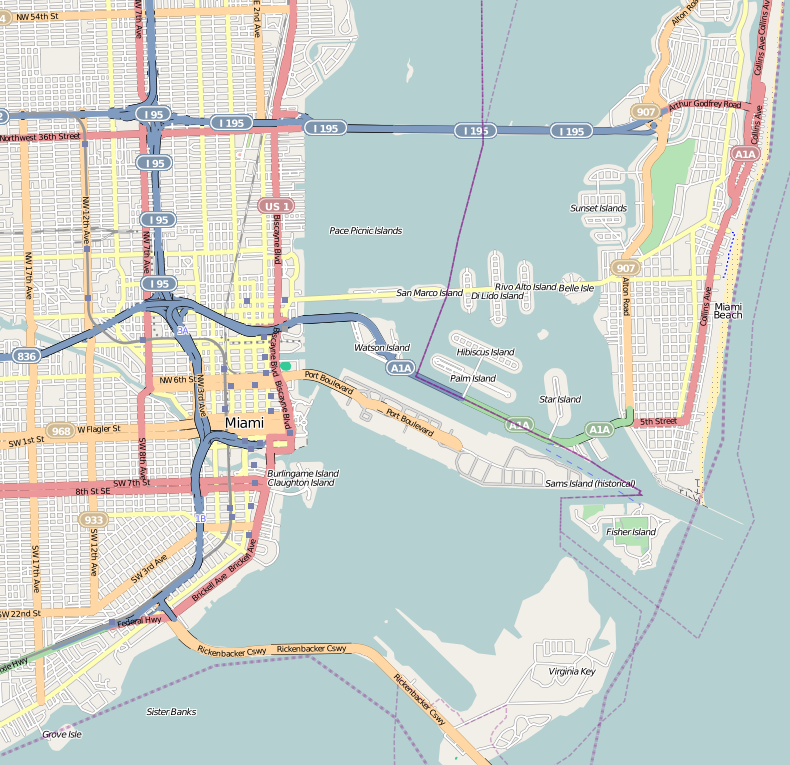
- Location within Central Miami Location within Florida
- Location: Miami Beach, Florida
- Coordinates: 25°47′9″N 80°8′3″W
- Area: 5,750 acres (23.3 km^{2})
- NRHP reference No.: 79000667
- Added to NRHP: May 14, 1979

The Miami Beach Architectural District (also known as Old Miami Beach Historic District and the more popular term Miami Art Deco District) is a U.S. historic district (designated as such on May 14, 1979) located in the South Beach neighborhood of Miami Beach, Florida. The area is well known as the district where Italian fashion designer Gianni Versace lived and was assassinated by Andrew Cunanan, in a mansion on Ocean Drive. It is bounded by the Atlantic Ocean to the east, Sixth Street to the south, Alton Road to the west and the Collins Canal and Dade Boulevard to the north. It contains 960 historic buildings.

== Historical significance ==
This historic district holds the largest collection of Art Deco buildings in the world, an umbrella term covering a range of styles such as "Streamline", "Tropical", and "Med-deco" and built mostly between the Great Depression and the early 1940s. Notably, the architectural movement reached Miami after the city's real estate market took a downturn in 1925, and the "Great Miami Hurricane" of 1926 that left 25,000 people homeless throughout the greater Miami region. Prior to the arrival of Art Deco, buildings in Miami Beach were primarily built in the Mediterranean Revival style. The historic district still contains many of these buildings, most of which were built in the early to mid-1920s.

The Art Deco designed buildings are often described as evoking technological modernity, resilience, and optimism. The Miami Beach Art Deco Museum describes the Miami building boom as coming mostly during the second phase of the architectural movement known as Streamline Moderne, a style that was “buttressed by the belief that times would get better, and was infused with the optimistic futurism extolled at American’s World Fairs of the 1930s.”

In 1989, it was listed in A Guide to Florida's Historic Architecture, published by the University of Florida Press.

The district includes areas of seasonal hotels, commercial strips, and residential area.

Hotels on Ocean Drive, which can actually face the ocean, run from 5th to 15th Streets and front onto Lummus Park, a public park and beach. Many of these "reflect the influences of the Moderne Style perpetuated at the International expositions of the 1930s": the Chicago World's Fair of 1933 and the New York World's Fair of 1939.

These include:

- Amsterdam Palace (1930), 1114-16 Ocean Drive, "one of the best examples of the Mediterranean Revival style to be seen in Miami Beach" Built around a central court-yard, it was designed as a replica or derivative of Christopher Columbus' home in Santo Domingo, in the Dominican Republic.
- the Victor (1937), 1144 Ocean Drive, International
- the Tides (1936), 1220 Ocean Drive, Decorated Moderne (See fig. 8 in NRHP document),
- the Carlyle (1941), 1250 Ocean Drive, Moderne (See fig. 5),
- the Cardoza (1939), 1300 Ocean Drive, Moderne,
- the Netherlands (1935), 1330 Ocean Drive, Decorated Moderne, and
- the Winterhaven (1939), 1400 Ocean Drive.

The district also includes:

- the Greystone Hotel (1939), 1920 Collins Ave., three stories, Decorated Moderne, designed by Henry Hohauser
- Surfcomber Hotel (1948), Decorated Moderne
- Raleigh Hotel (Miami Beach) (1940)
- The Blackstone Hotel (1929), 800 Washington Ave., 13-story former hotel and now an apartment building, Mediterranean Revival
- Miami Beach Old City Hall (1927), 1130 Washington Ave., 9-story Mediterranean Revival

== Notable architects ==
- Albert Anis
- Lester Avery
- L. Murray Dixon
- Charles R. Greco
- Henry Hohauser
- Russell Pancoast

=== Gallery ===
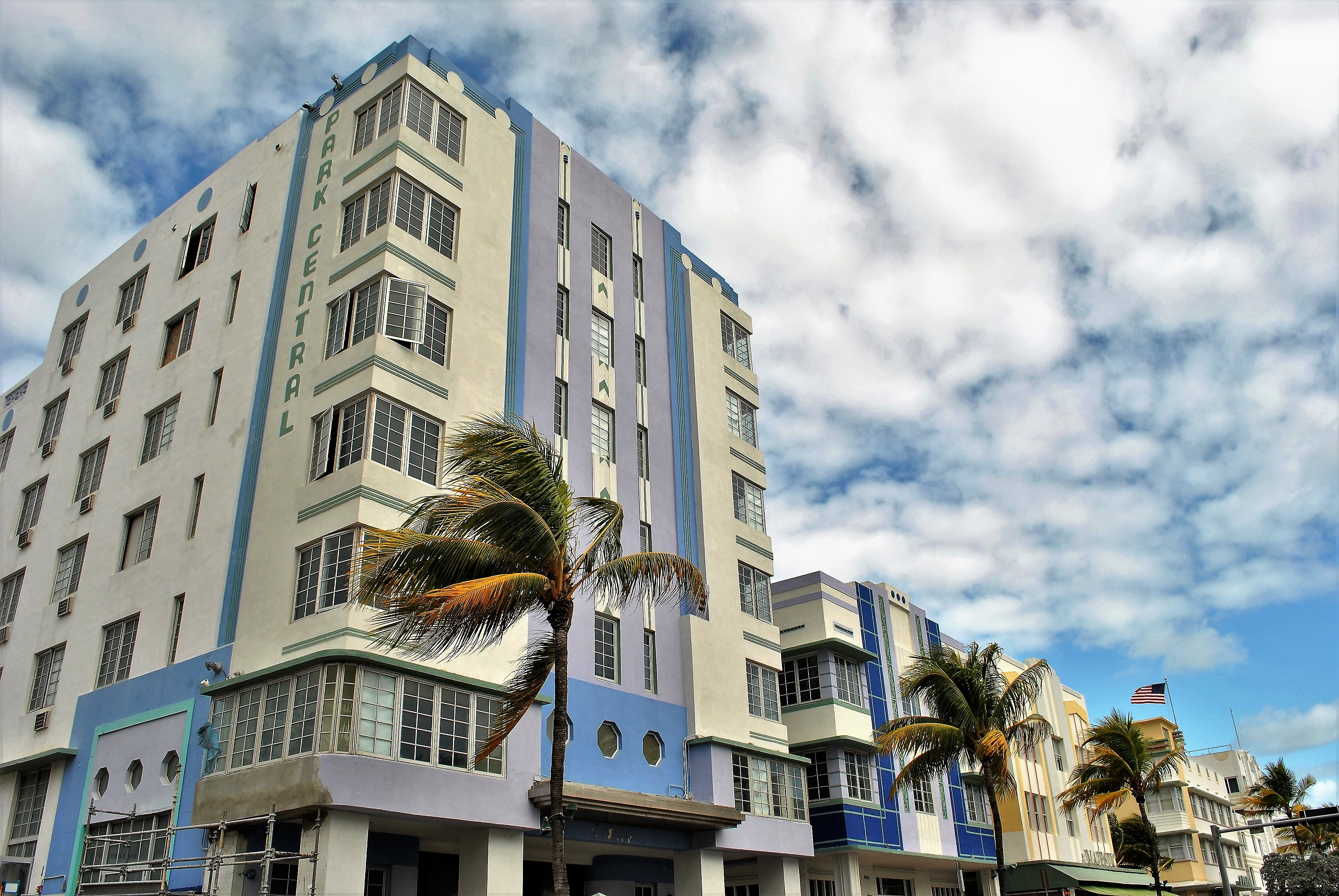
Park Central (Henry Hohauser, 1937)

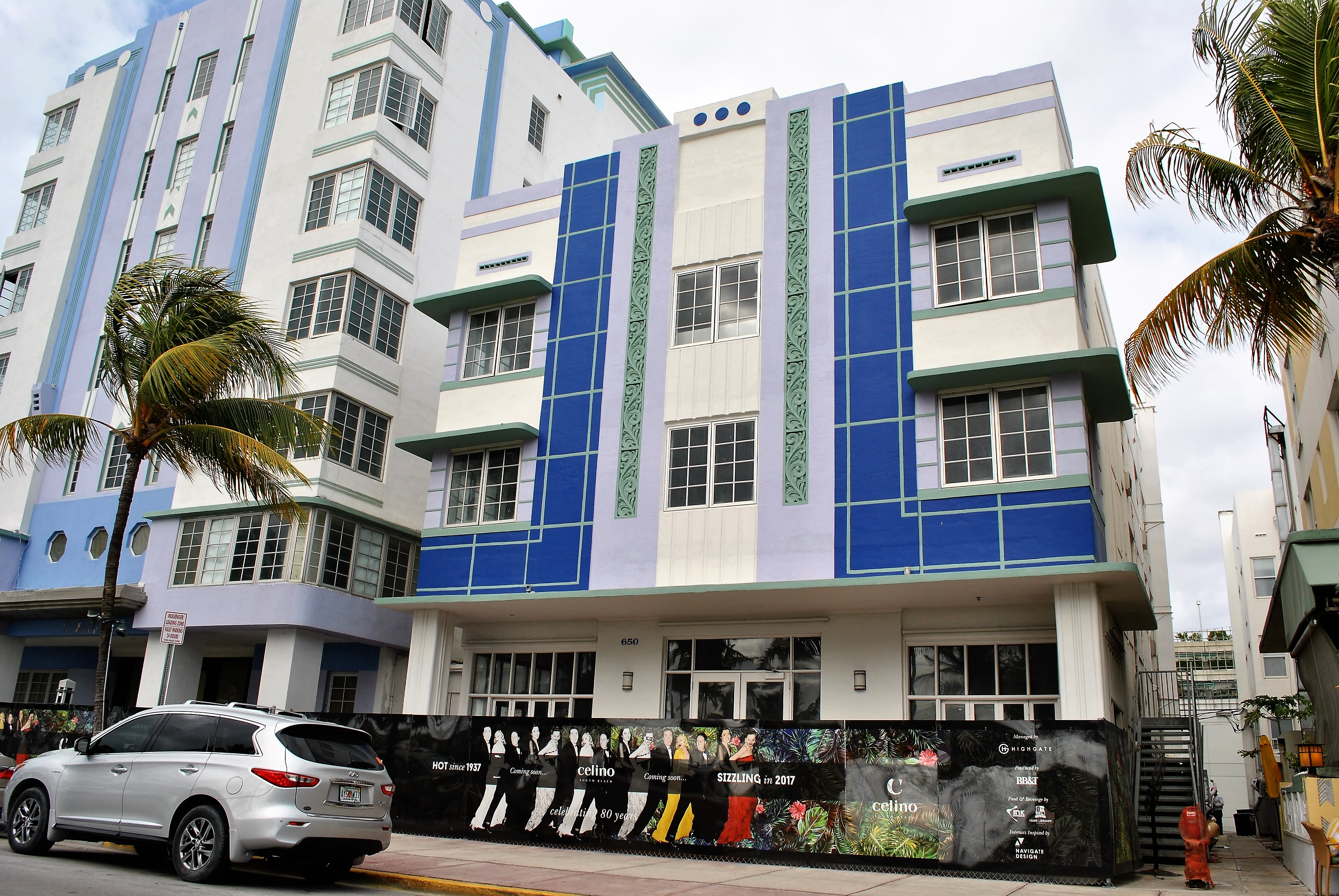
Imperial (1939)

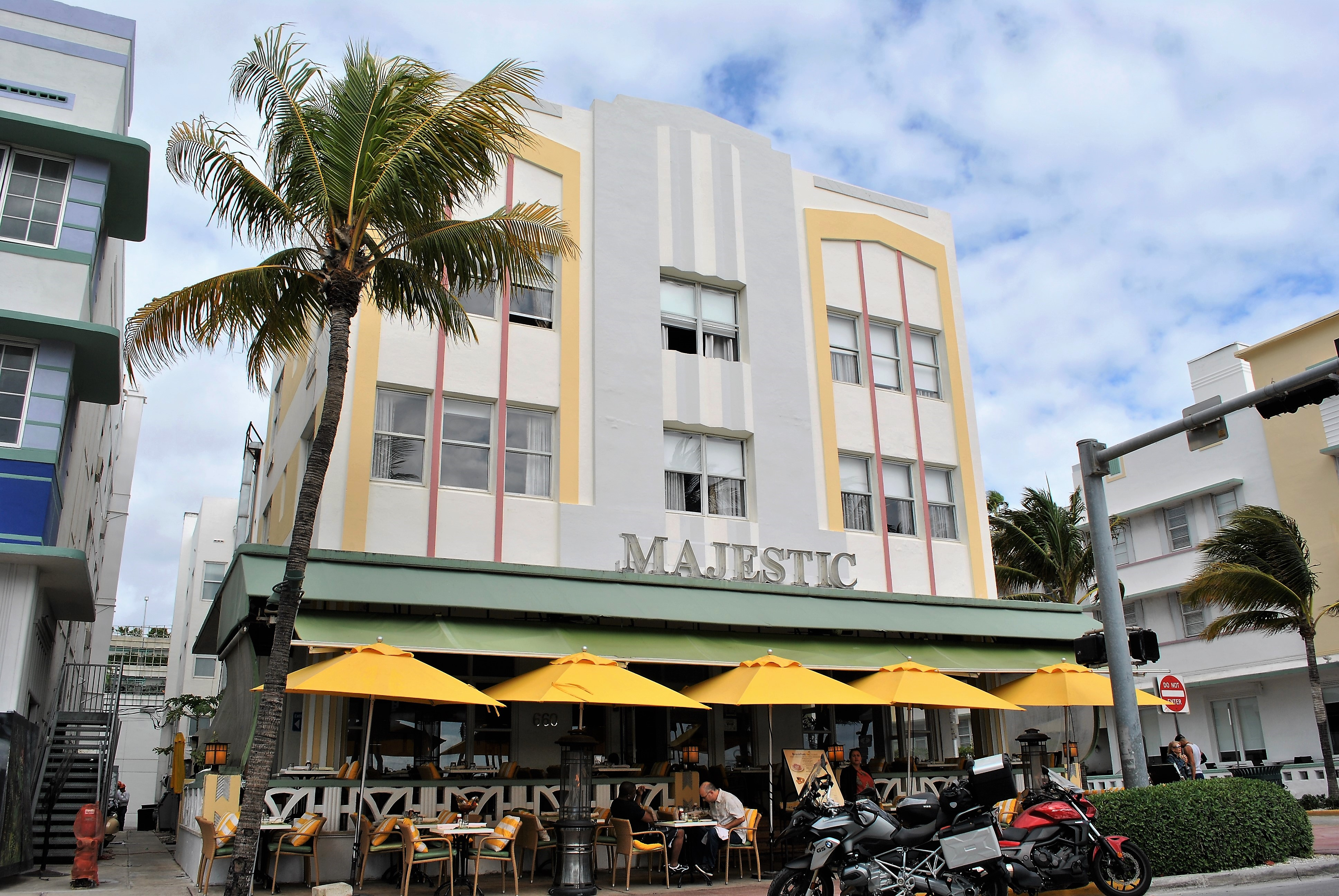
Majestic (Albert Anis, 1940)

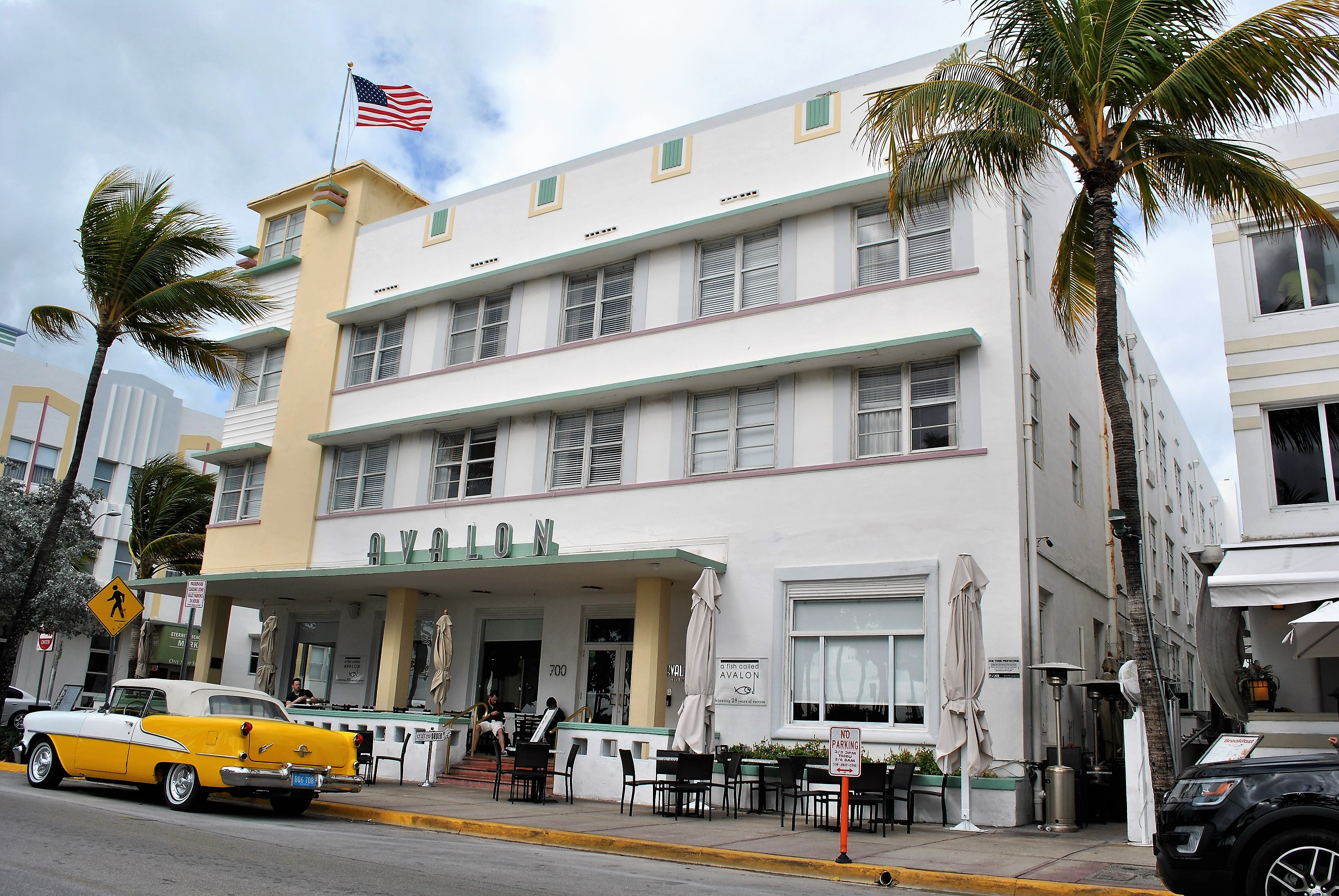
Avalon (Albert Anis, 1941)

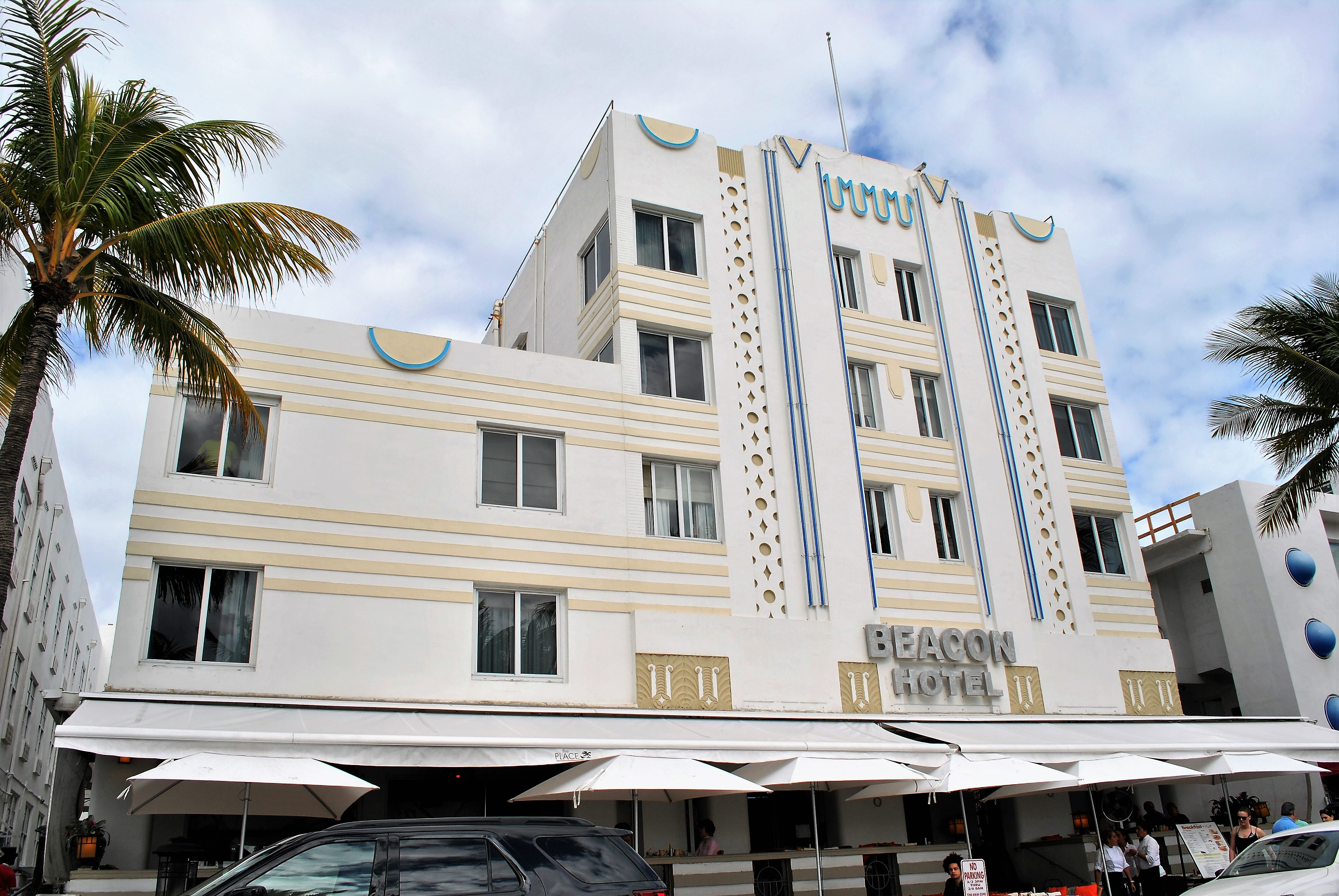
Beacon (Henry O. Nelson, 1936)

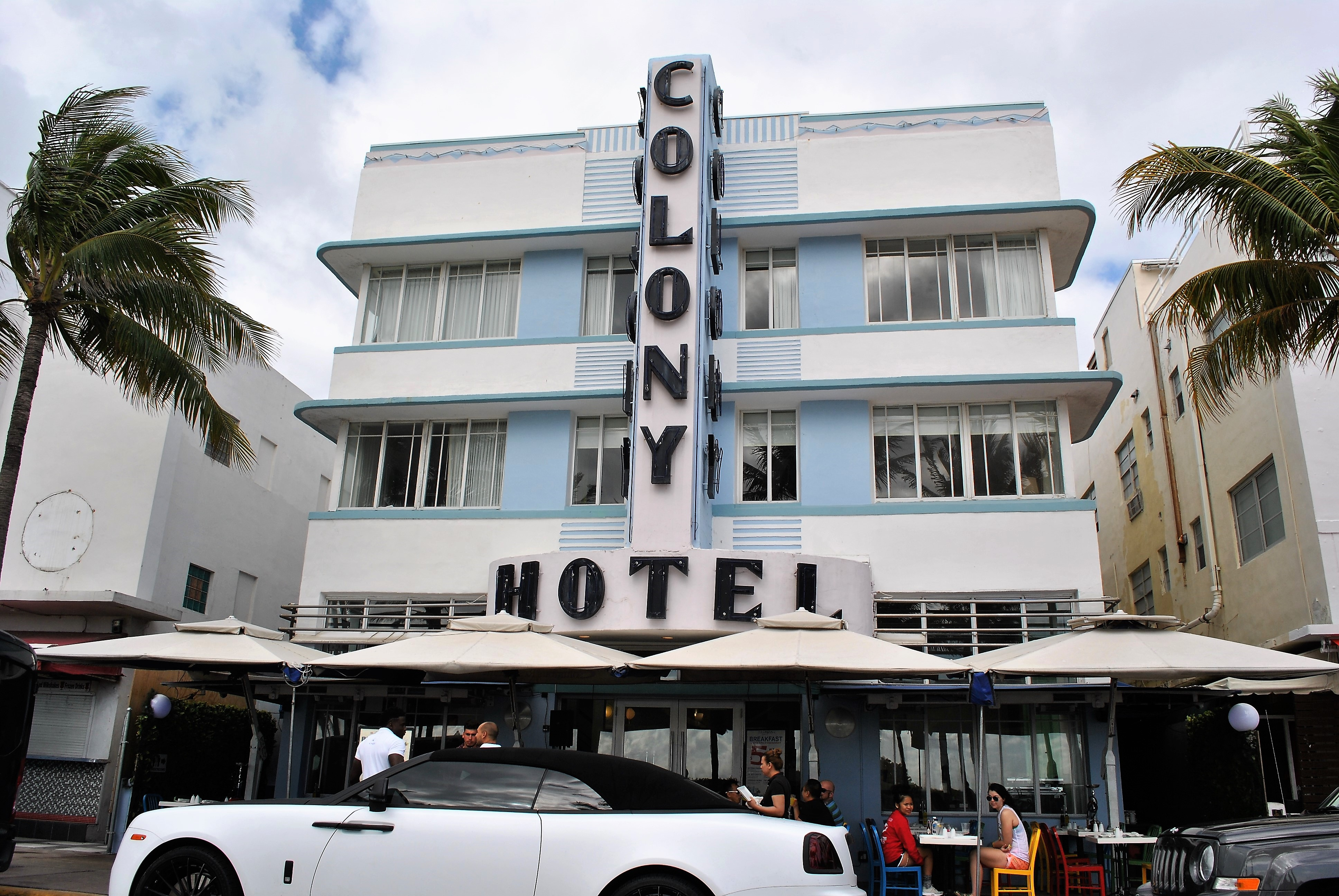
Colony (Henry Hohauser, 1935)

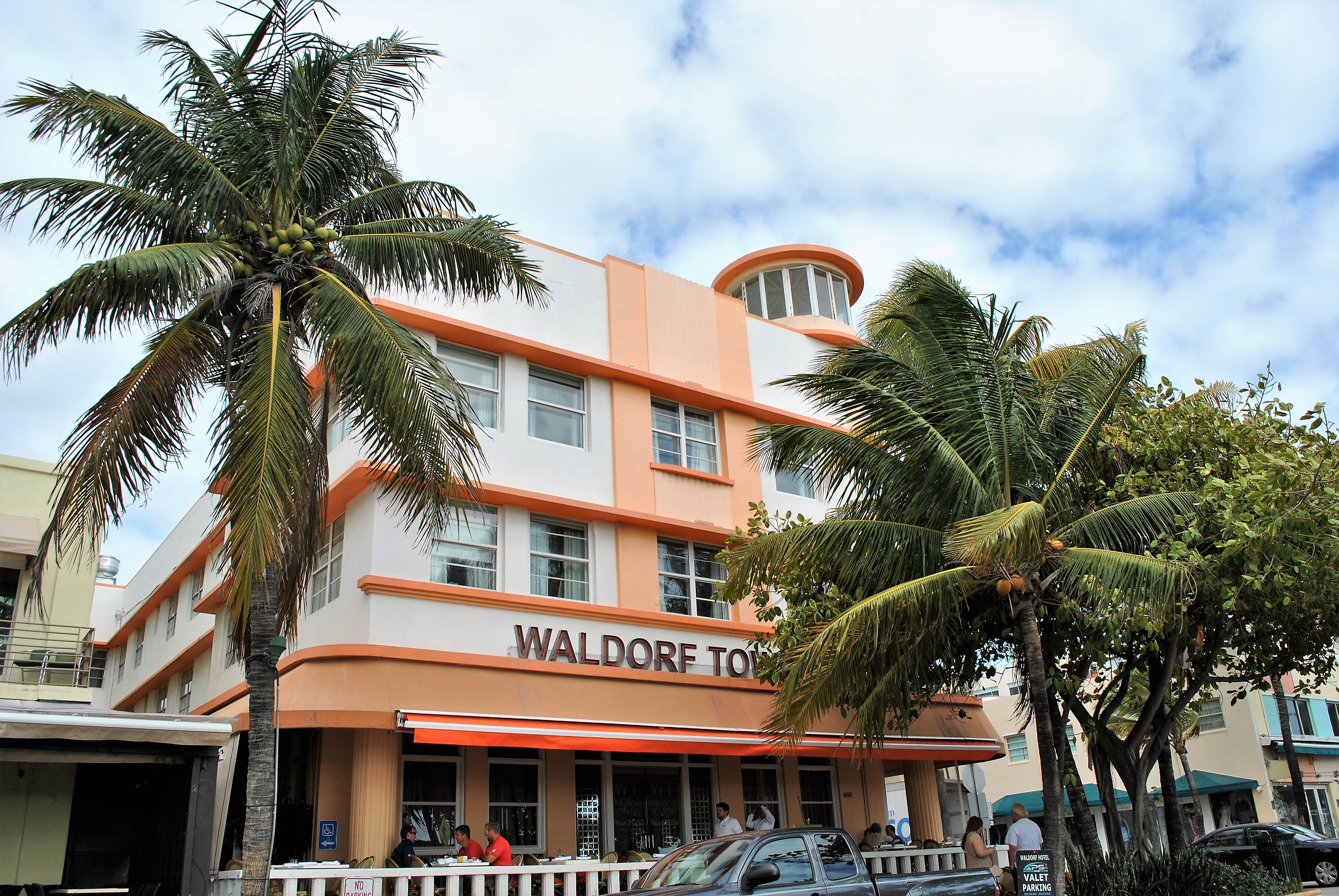
Waldorf Towers (Albert Anis, 1937)

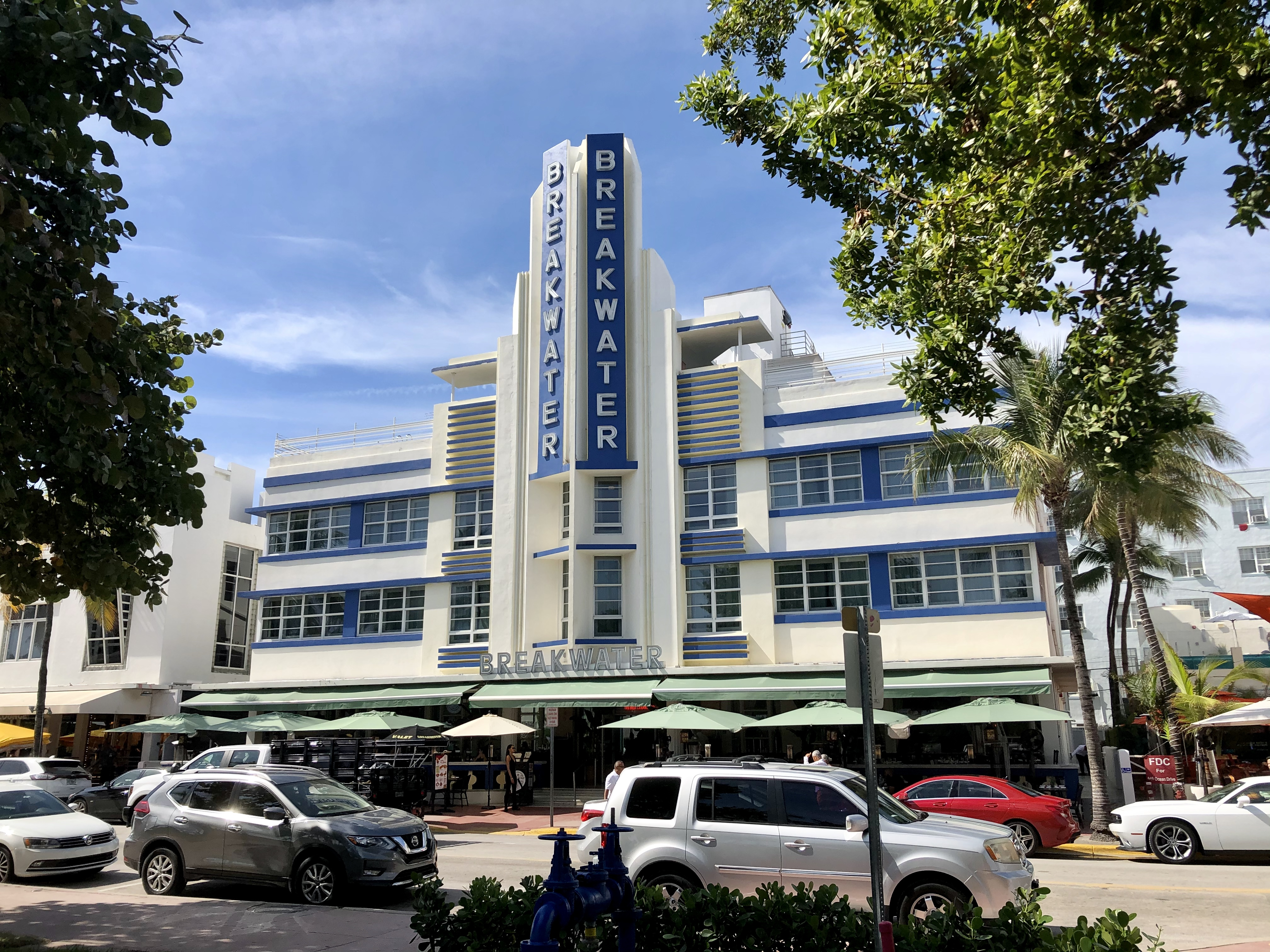
Breakwater (Anton Skislewicz, 1939)

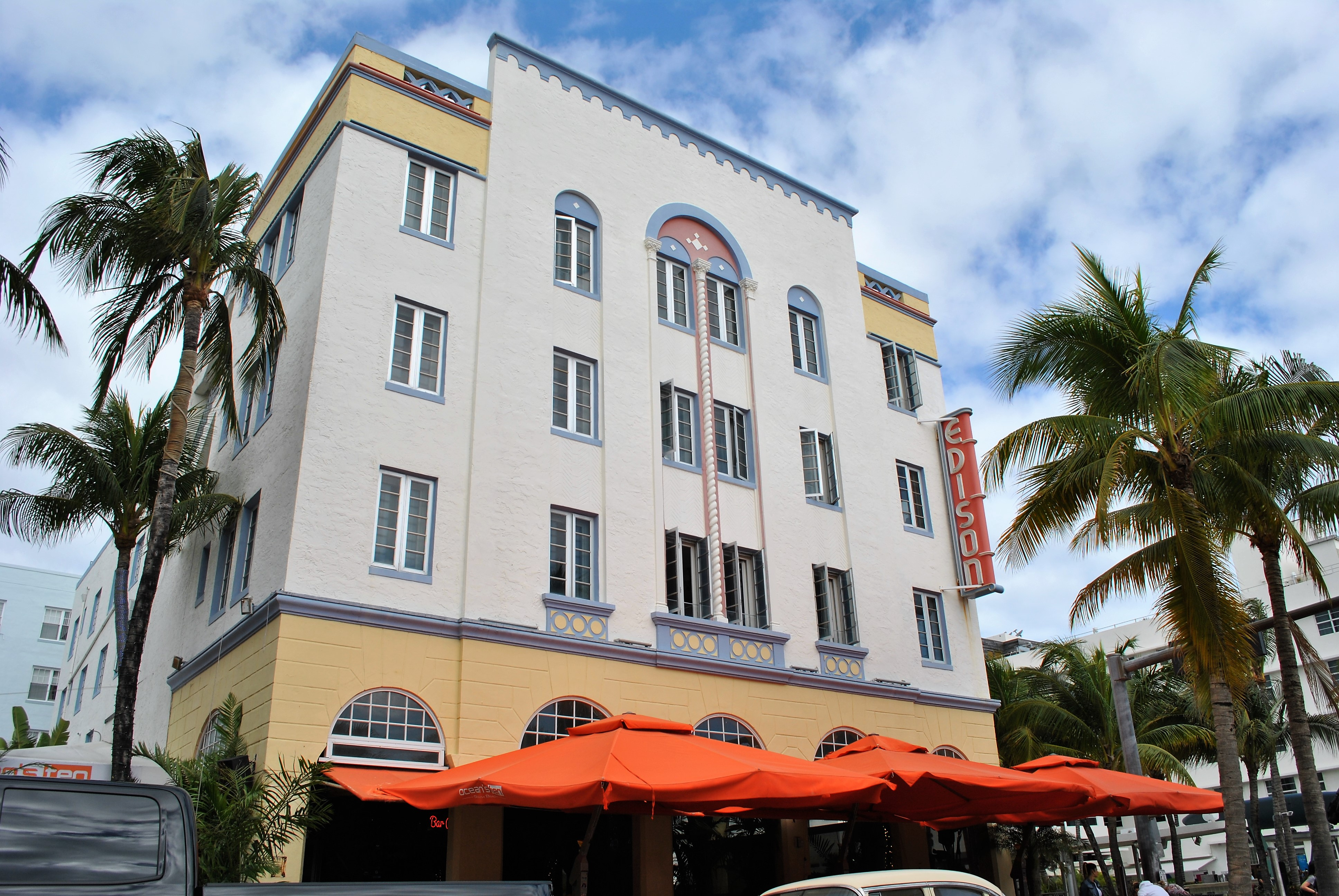
Edison (Henry Hohauser, 1935)

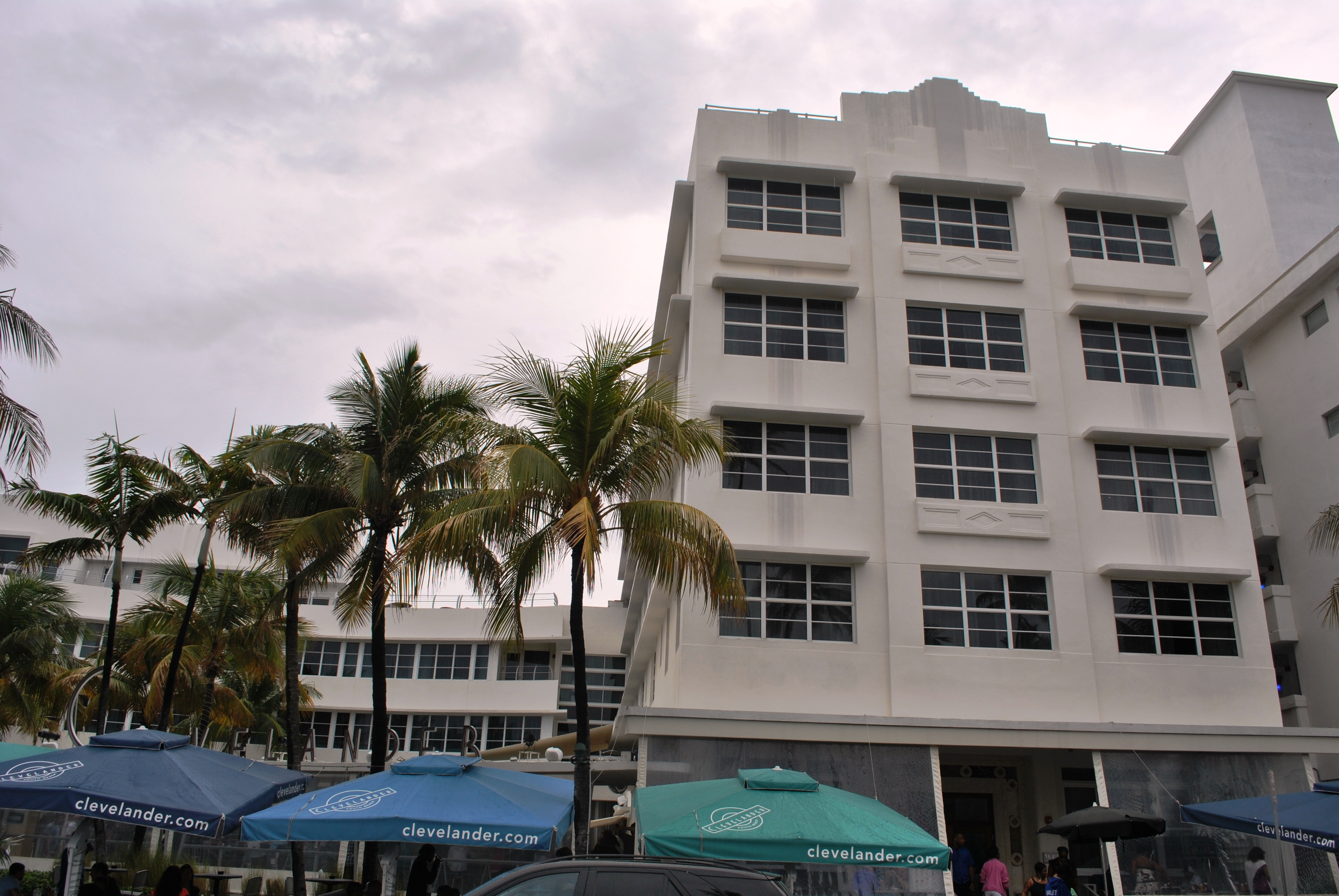
Clevelander (Albert Anis, 1939)

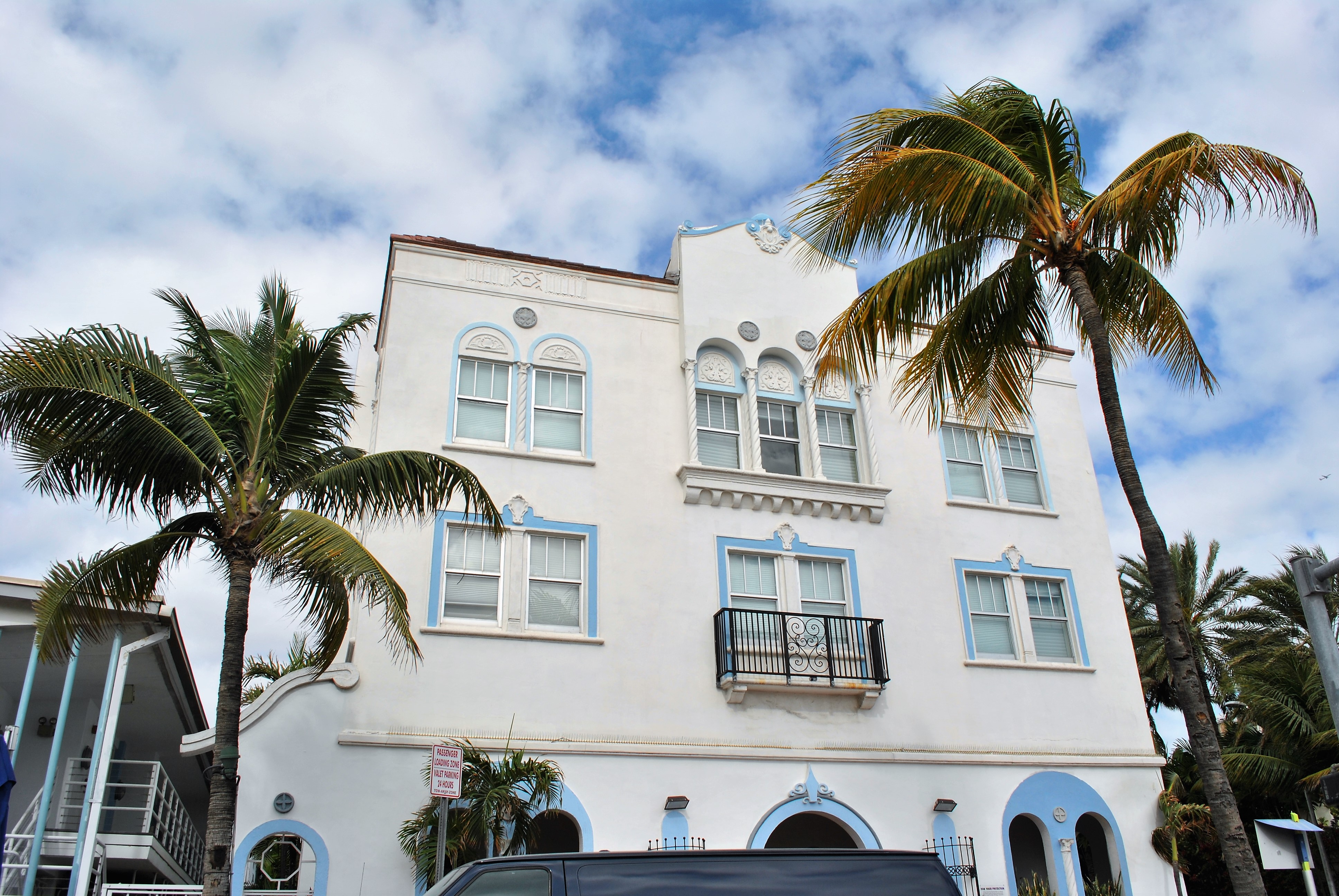
Adrian (1934)

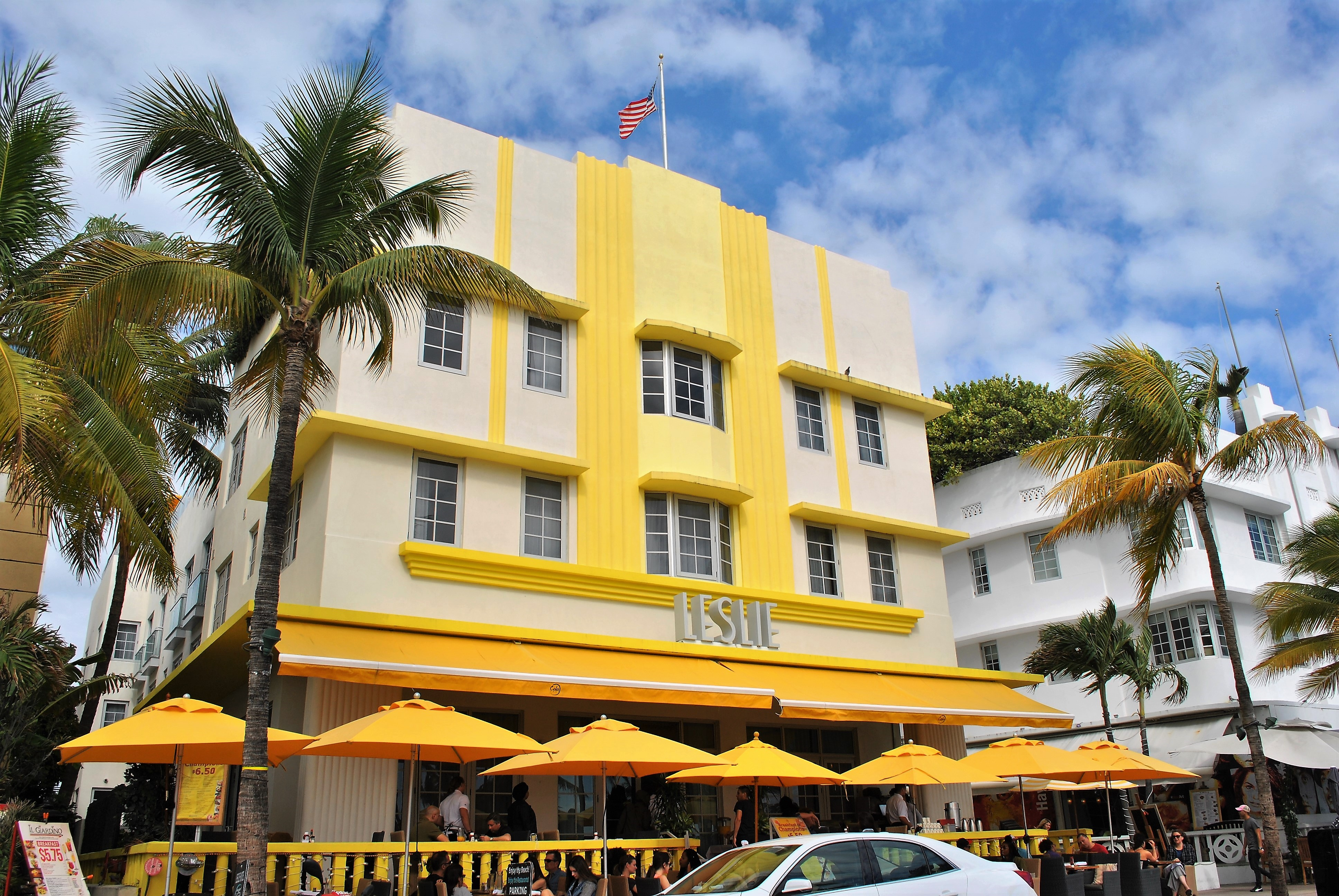
Leslie (Albert Anis, 1937)

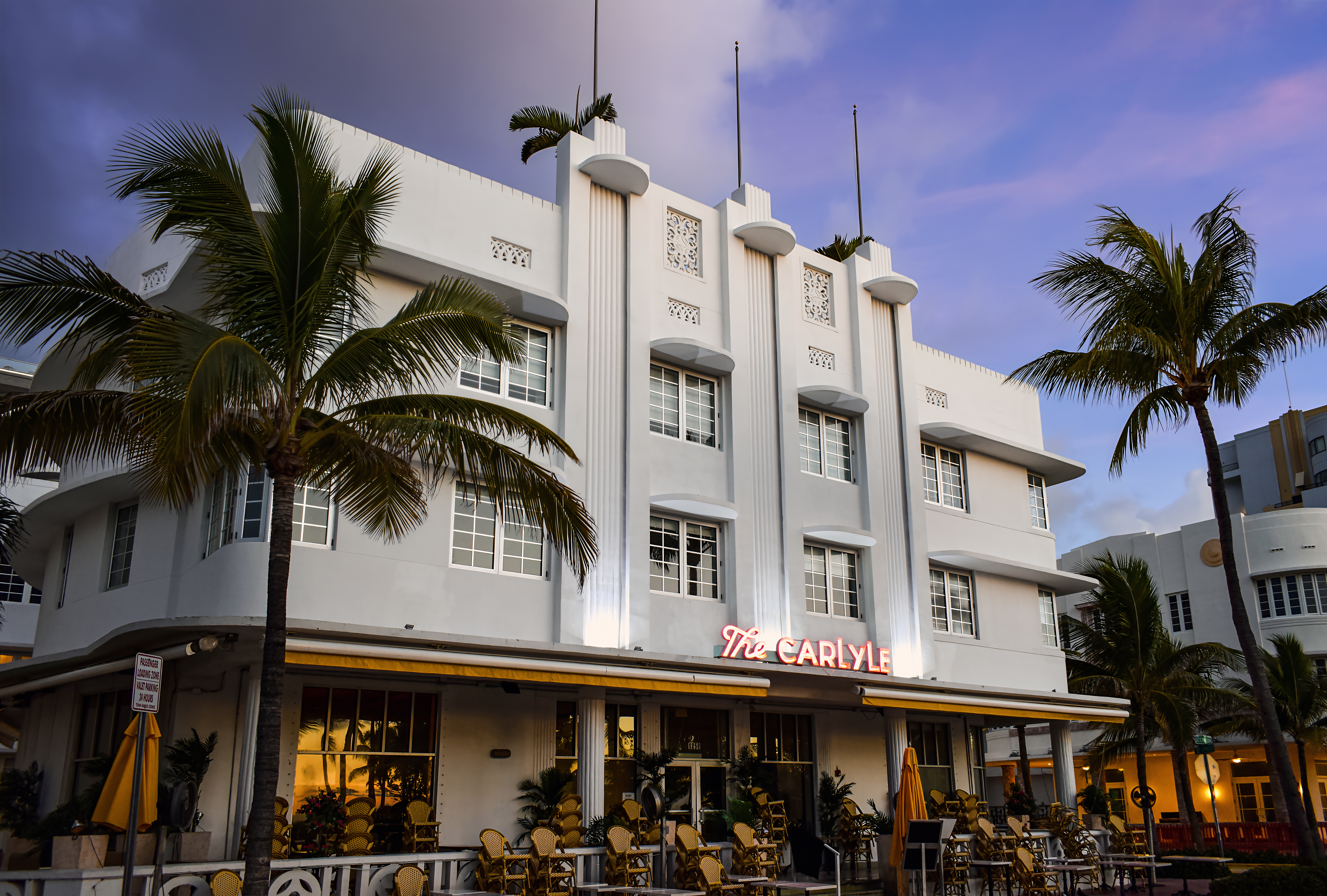
The Carlyle (1941)

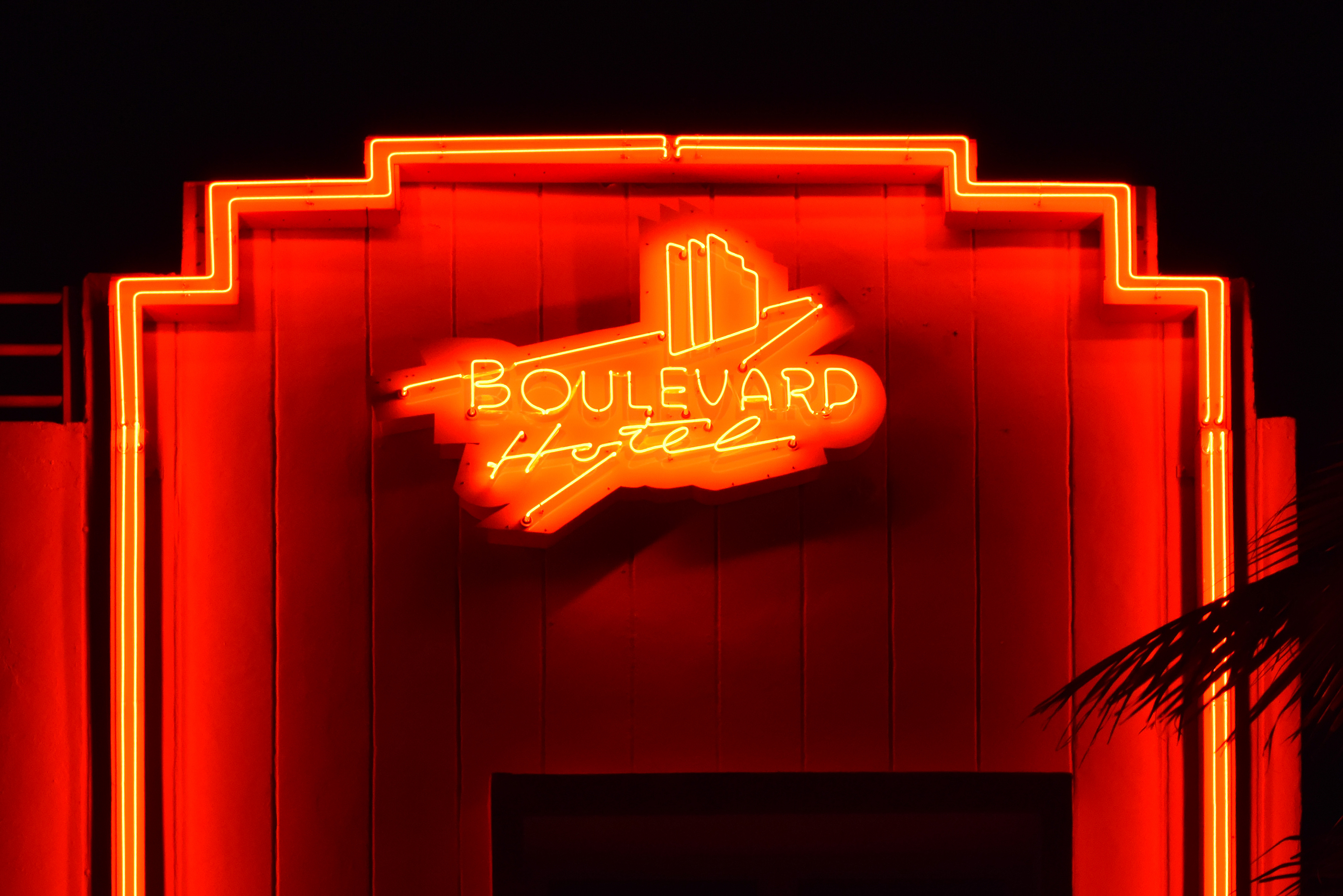
Boulevard Hotel (August Swarz, 1950)

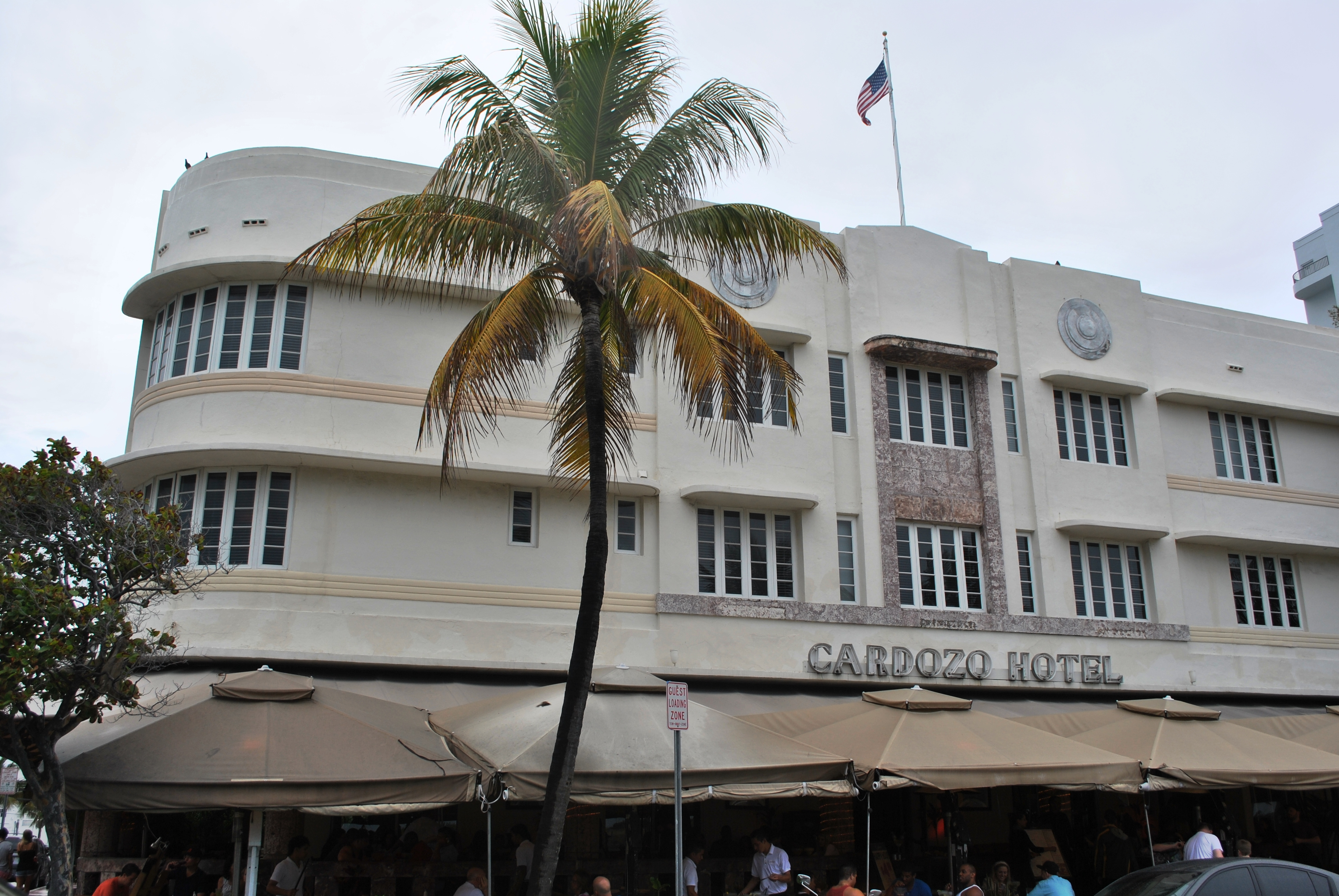
Cardozo (Henry Hohauser, 1939)

Cavalier (1936)

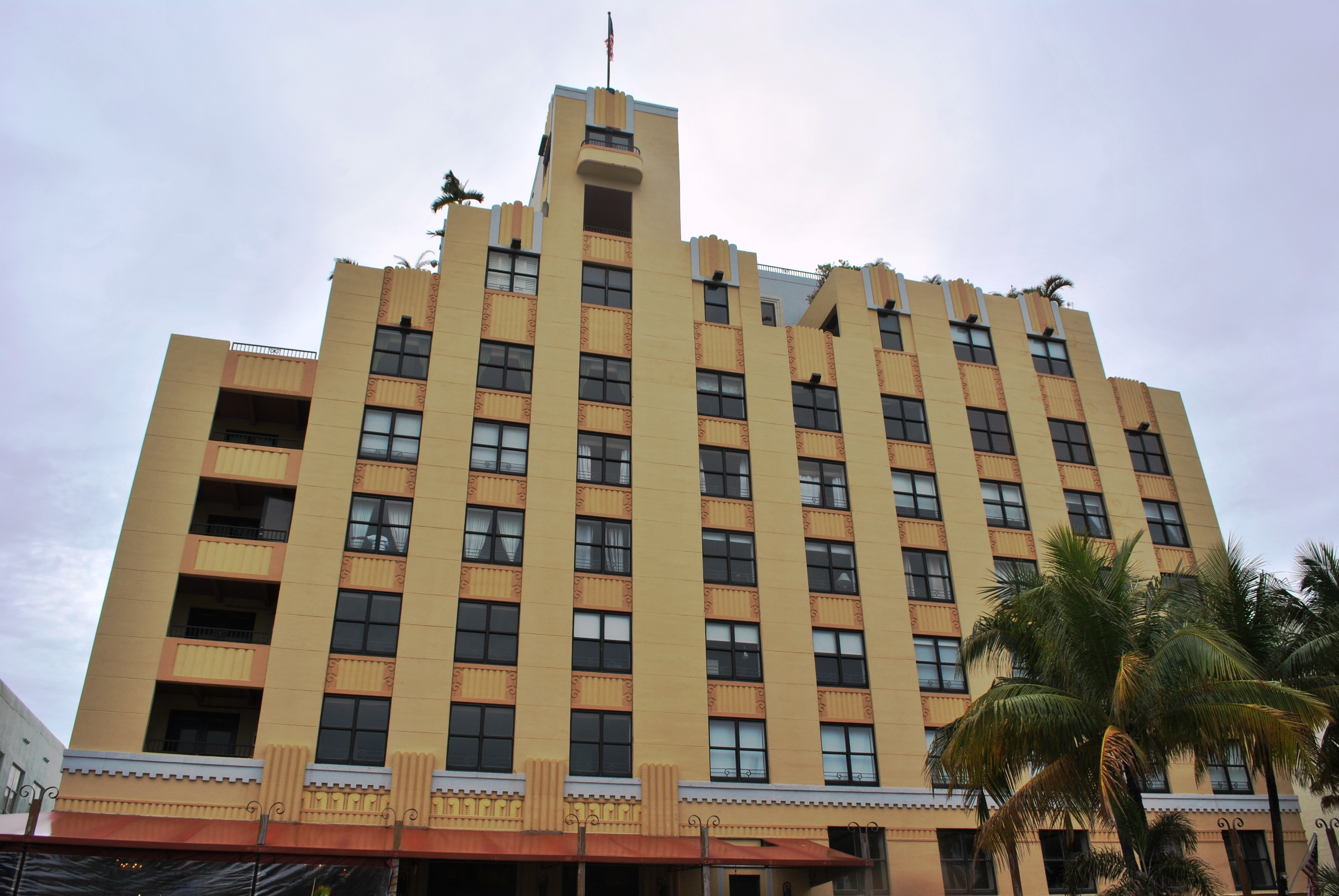
Netherlands Hotel (1935)

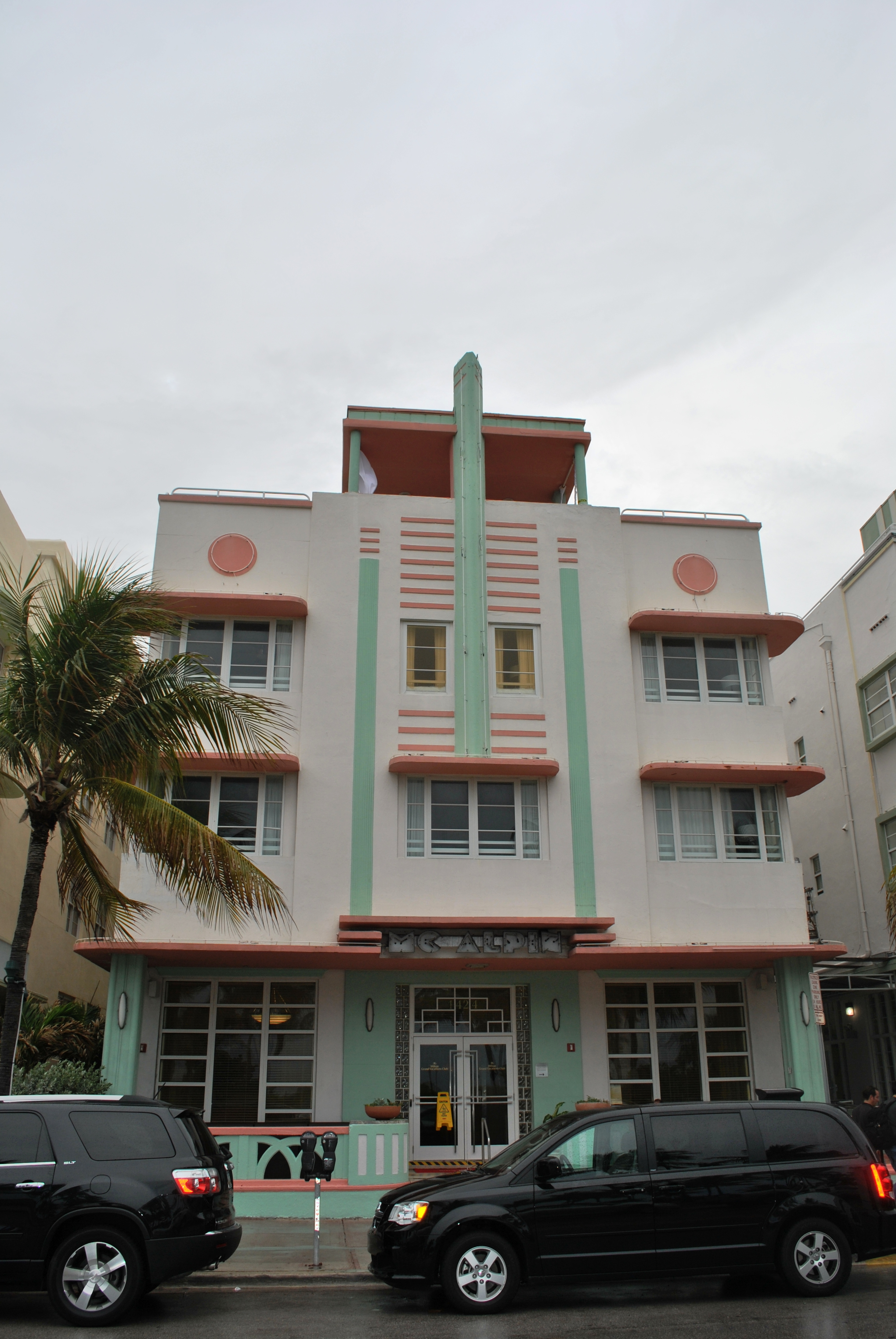
McAlpin Hotel (L. Murray Dixon, 1940)

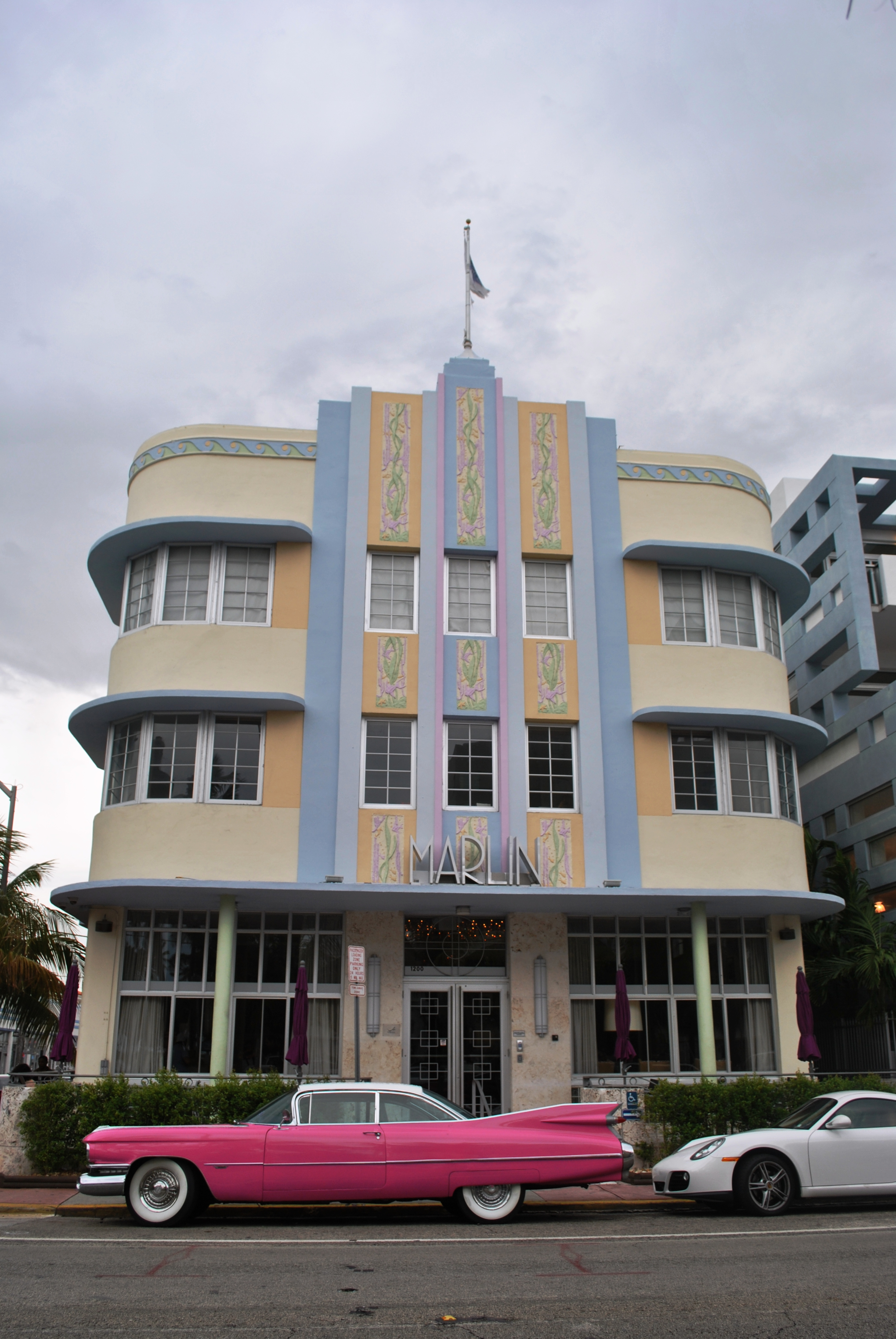
Marlin Hotel

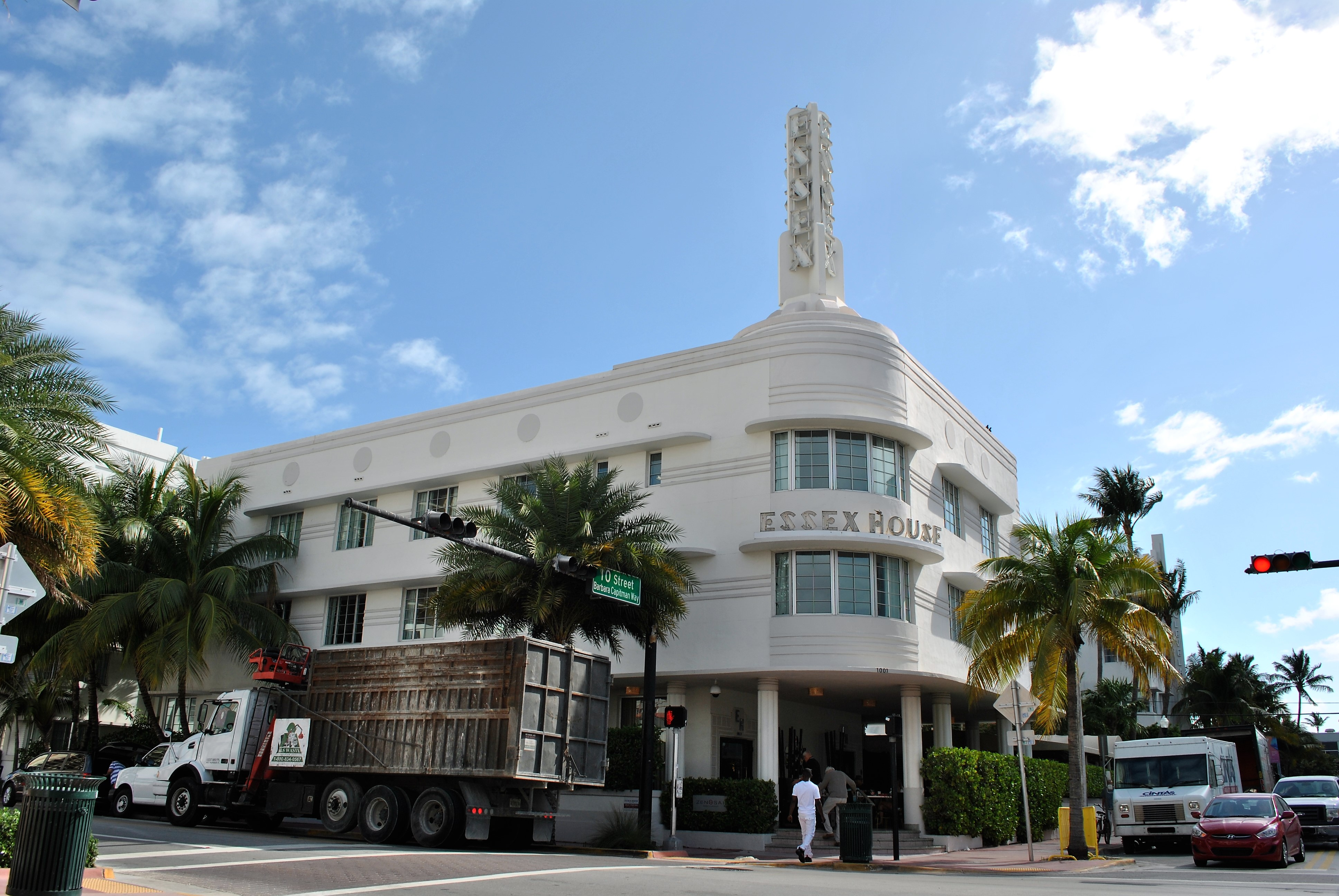
Essex House (Henry Hohauser, 1938)
