= Greystone Miami Beach =

Historic art-deco hotel in Miami

- U.S. Historic district – Contributing property

- Location within Florida Location within the United States
- Location: 1920 Collins Ave, Miami Beach, Florida
- Coordinates: 25°47′44″N 80°07′46″W
- Built: 1939
- Part of: Miami Beach Architectural District (ID79000667)
- Designated CP: May 14, 1979

Greystone Miami Beach, in Miami Beach, Florida, is an Art Deco-style hotel built in 1939. It has also been known as the Greystone Hotel or as The Greystone. It was "designed by renowned architect Henry Hohauser, who was given the title of “Great Floridian” by Florida's Department of State in 1993 for his major contribution to the distinct Art Deco architectural scene present throughout the region."

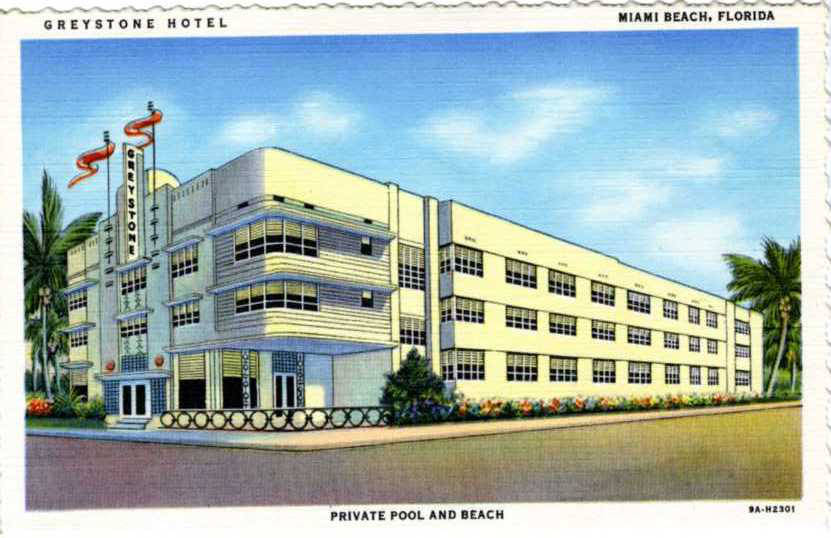
Curt Teich postcard

It is located in Miami Beach's Art Deco district, and was listed on the National Register of Historic Places in 1979 as a contributing building in the Miami Beach Architectural District.

In the 1979 nomination of that district, the Greystone was characterised as being Decorative Moderne in style. The nomination noted that "the Greystone Hotel is in beautiful condition. On the west side of Collins Avenue, it is most noticeable, located on the corner of 19th Street. The main entrance features a pair of round windows etched with tropical scenes. The almost square facade is divided into thirds, with the central section ornamented with vertical stripes and a stepped, three-stage parapet. The horizontal flanking portions of the facade are decorated with bands of 'tattersall check' between the ribbon windows at the curved corners. It is the detail of this building, the round windows, the flagstaffs on the parapet, and the incised squares in the stucco, that make this building so charming."

It was a member of the Historic Hotels of America in 2020, but is no longer a member in 2022.

It was under renovation in 2019.

In 2022 Architectural Digest termed the hotel an "architectural gem", "one of architect Henry Hohauser's iconic hotels", and one of "eight iconic buildings throughout the city that have been renovated to showcase their historic value through a 21st-century lens." It noted the reopening of the hotel as "Hotel Greystone" in September 2021, and stated that Holly Muhl of Bowenholly, "who led the interior design, said, 'Our goal was to create something stylish and comfortable that evokes the dynamic layers of Miami Beach. The building offers so many opportunities for a sophisticated audience depending on your mood, and we wanted every space to give guests a welcome and authentic sense of place.' Its signature restaurant, Sérêvène, serves up fare using Japanese ingredients and French techniques; its neighboring Greystone Jazz Bar presents a sing-along piano bar by candlelight."

In 2021, partners who owned the hotel were in litigation with each other; a lawsuit was dismissed in January 2022 however.
