= Far Rockaway Beach Bungalow Historic District =

Historic district in Queens, New York

- Far Rockaway Beach Bungalow; Historic District
- U.S. National Register of Historic Places
- U.S. Historic district
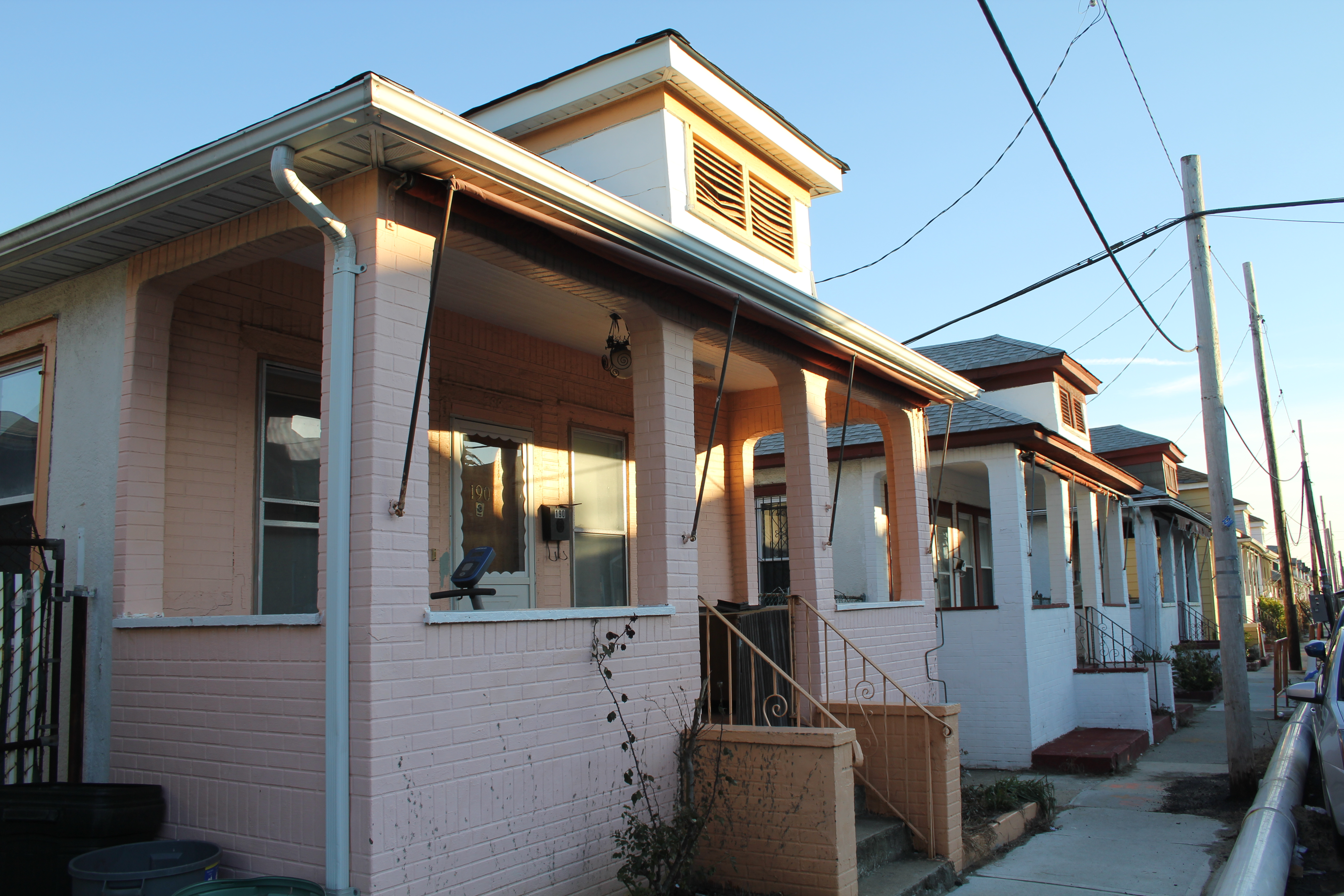
- Houses in the district

- Location within New York City Location within New York Location within the United States
- Location: Beach 24th St., Beach 25th St., and Beach 26th St. between the Rockaway Boardwalk on the south and Seagirt Ave on the north, in Far Rockaway neighborhood of the borough of Queens in New York City
- Coordinates: 40.5943°N 73.7583°W
- Area: 5.8 acres (2.3 ha)
- Built: 1921
- Architect: Henry Hohauser
- Architectural style: Early 20th Century American Movement / Bungalow
- NRHP reference No.: 13000499
- Added to NRHP: 7/17/2013

Far Rockaway Beach Bungalow Historic District is a historic area in Far Rockaway, Queens County, New York. It includes summer beach bungalows near the oceanfront of Far Rockaway, first brought to the area by developer John J. Eagan. They are smaller than the usual domestic bungalows of the 1920s. They were built in 1921 using pattern book designs incorporating uniform facades, compact interiors, integrated porches and exposed rafters. Their architect, Henry Hohauser, became better known in the 1930s as a designer of Art Deco hotels in Miami Beach. The district was hit by Hurricane Sandy in 2012, but survived without major damage. The district is located along Beach 24th, 25th, and 26th Streets. It was listed on the National Register of Historic Places in 2013.

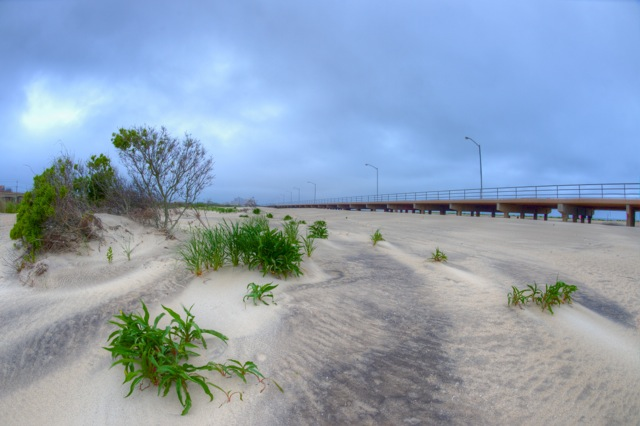
Looking east from Beach 48th Street, a location of former bungalows

== History ==
The neighborhood's heyday as a resort community ended about 1950. The families that used the nearby Long Island Rail Road to get to the area each summer began to vacation elsewhere as travel by automobile became more accessible to many people. The popularity of the area also suffered after the railroad abandoned the Rockaway Beach Branch in 1950, making travel to the Rockaway Peninsula far less convenient to people from other parts of New York City. Much of the housing in the area was converted into year-round housing for low-income residents, and some of the bungalows were used as public housing.

The urban renewal programs instituted by Robert Moses in the 1950s and '60s contributed to the year round residency and eventual decline of Far Rockaway as a resort community. The closing of the primary rail bridge after a fire in 1950, and the migration of families to other beaches also contributed to changes in the community. The urban renewal also saw the rise of condos and housing projects in the area, and many low income residents of Manhattan were re-located to Far Rockaway, with some moving to the poorly maintained bungalows, which were not built for winters. Years of neglect and disinvestment gave way to decline causing many bungalows to be designated slums. By the 1980s, many of the bungalows had been razed, and crime and poverty were on the rise. Only about 100 bungalows remain.

The Beachside Bungalow Preservation Association (BBPA) was formed in September 1984 by Betzie Parker White, Roger White, and Carole Lewis. Betzie White was the head, or chairman, of the BBPA and established it as a non-profit 501(c)3 in June 1986. Richard George became a board member in 1985, and chairman around 1990.

In 1990, the association set up an office and hired a staff to organize community programs. Another grant enabled the planting of beach grass, shrubs, and other salt-tolerant plants along the boardwalk from Beach 24th-Beach 27th Streets in 1992. As a result of the plantings, a double-dune system developed that acts as a barrier against erosion and storm damage. The association's work resulted in the rezoning of the neighborhood. The rezoning protects the low-scale housing stock, including the bungalows and one- and two-family homes. It also secures the bungalows' ocean views and public access to the beach.

There has been a renewed interest in the area in recent years, as many creative types from Manhattan have flocked to the Rockaways. Some of the bungalows have been restored, while property values have risen considerably. In the late 1990s, the BBPA began to work with other local preservationists to obtain governmental recognition of the district's status as the last intact bungalow community in Far Rockaway. Its efforts were boosted in 2011 when it received a $10,000 donation from the producers of the television show Boardwalk Empire which had filmed scenes in the area in 2009. This enabled the organization to hire an expert to produce the documentation needed to support the 2013 listing on the National Register of Historic Places and similar state recognition. This status is largely symbolic, however, so the BBPA then shifted its focus to obtaining landmark district designation from the New York City Landmarks Preservation Commission, which would provide real legal protection to the district.

== In popular culture ==
The HBO series Boardwalk Empire used as a filming location in 2009, depicting the bungalow community for its first episode. Bootleg Productions, the production company behind the series, sent a check for $10,000 after receiving a letter from Carmela George. Joseph Iberti explained, "As a period show set in the 1920s, we appreciate the importance of preserving what is left of period architecture and felt that our contribution could have an impact in this regard."

Groucho Marx invested in 24 bungalows in the 1920s.

== Gallery ==
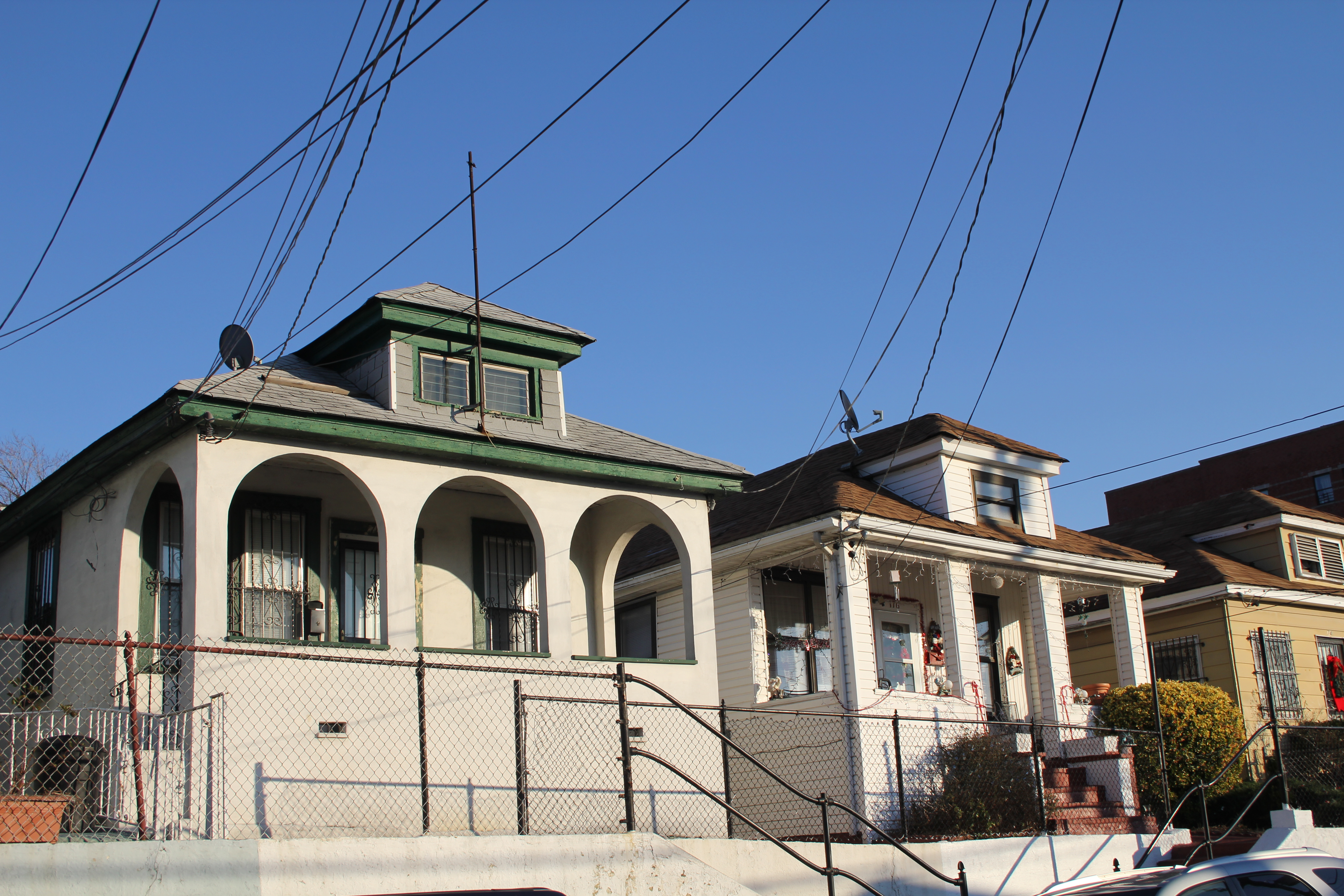
Houses on Beach 24th Street, east side

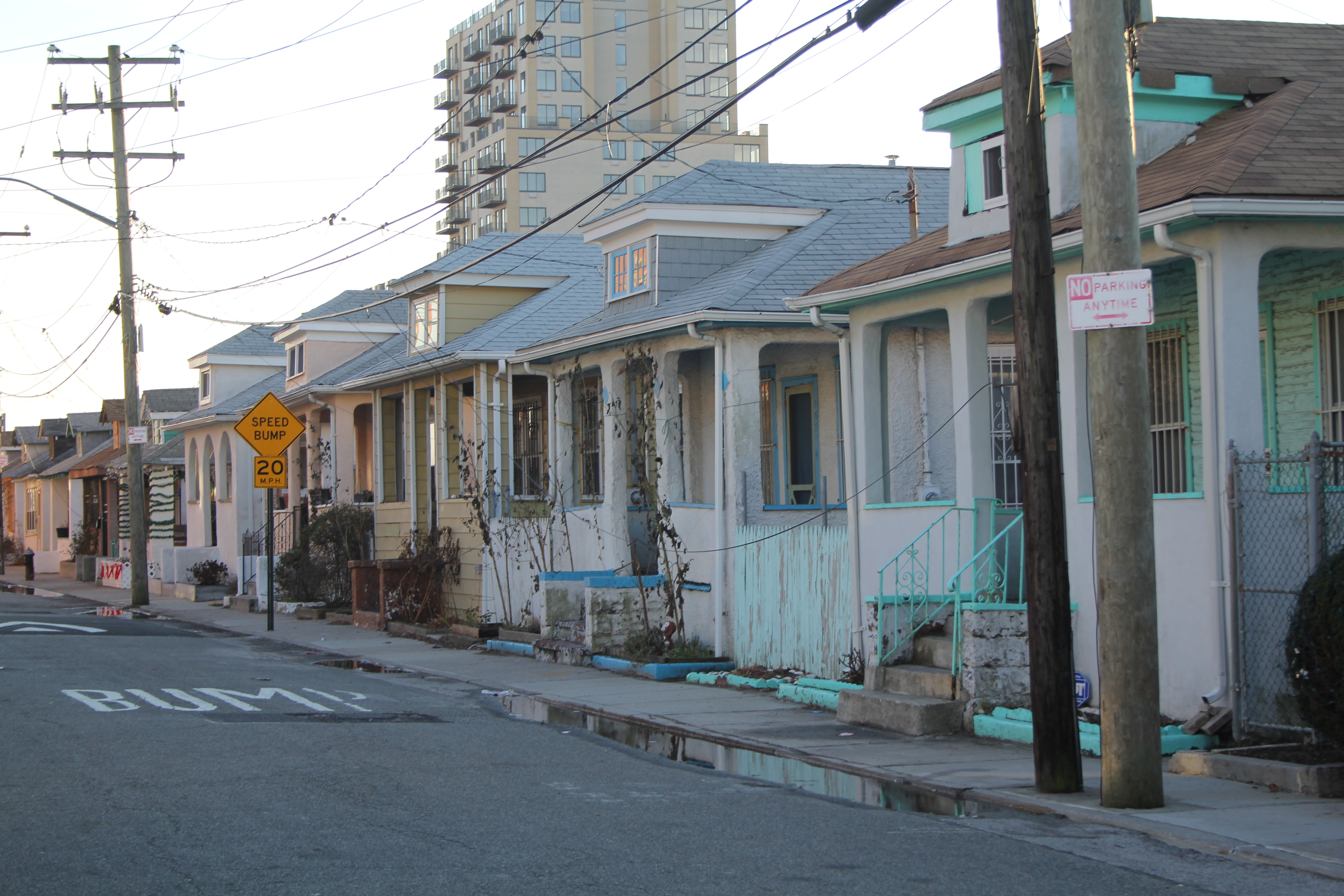
Houses on Beach 24th Street, west side

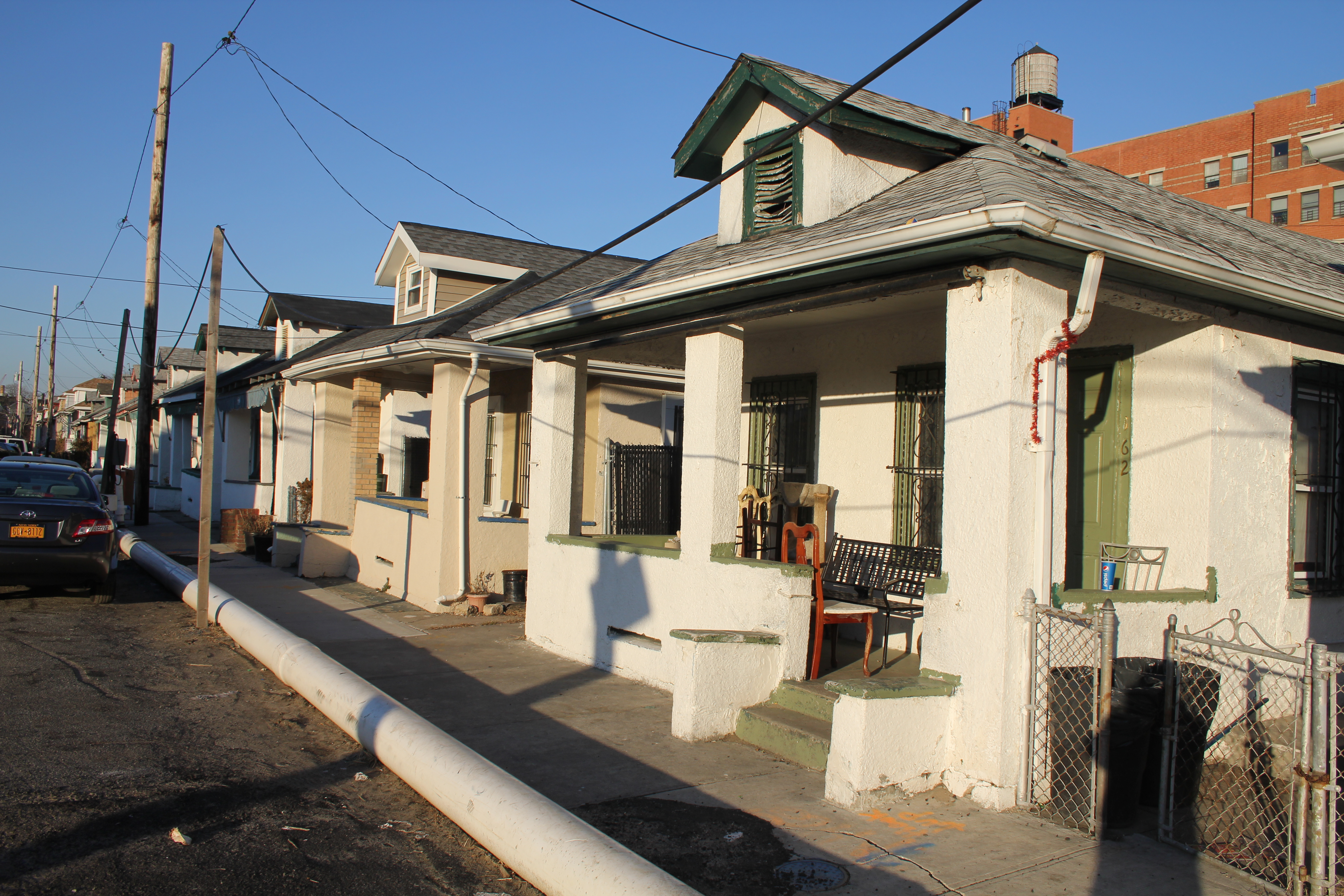
Houses on Beach 24th Street, west side
