= Surfcomber Hotel =

Historic hotel in Miami Beach, Florida

Kimpton Surfcomber Hotel
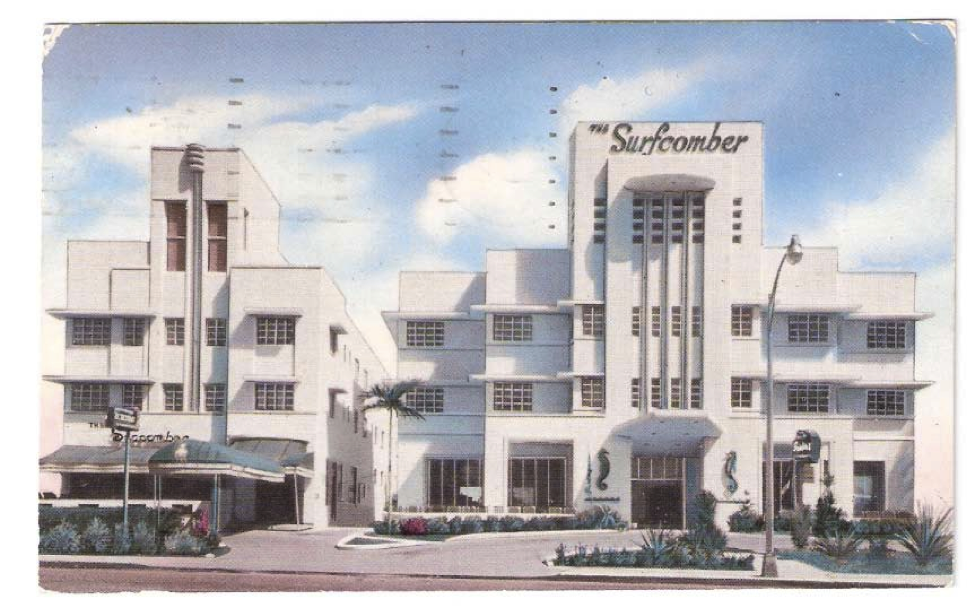
- The Surfcomber Hotel, c. 1950

- Location within Florida

General information
- Location: South Beach, Miami Beach, Florida, U.S., 1717 Collins Avenue
- Coordinates: 25°47′34″N 80°7′46″W
- Opened: 1948
- Management: Kimpton Hotels

Other information
- Number of rooms: 186
- Number of restaurants: 1

Website
- www.surfcomber.com

The Surfcomber Hotel is a boutique hotel on Collins Avenue in the historic Art Deco district of South Beach in Miami Beach, Florida. The hotel was built in 1948 and was acquired by the Kimpton hotel chain in April 2011. The Surfcomber is known for pool parties, and it served as the headquarters for MTV during the 2005 MTV Video Music Awards and for Bud Light during Super Bowl XLIV in 2010. The hotel is located at 1717 Collins Avenue on the shore of Miami's South Beach.

== Architecture ==
The hotel's exterior in 1980

The style of the hotel is an example of transitional architecture, bridging the ornamental styles of Art Deco from the 1930s with the streamlined and modern graphics language of the late forties and fifties. The architectural firm MacKay & Gibbs was also responsible for the design of several other Art Deco hotels in Miami, including the Sherbrooke Hotel built in 1947.

The Surfcomber is one of many historic buildings in the Miami Beach Architectural District, also called the Miami Beach Art Deco District. Art Deco is an eclectic artistic and design style that began in Paris in the 1920s and flourished internationally throughout the 1930s and 1940s. The Miami Beach Architectural District was listed on the National Register of Historic Places in 1979. It has the world's largest collection of Art Deco architecture and comprises hundreds of hotels, apartments, and other structures built from the 1920s to the 1940s. The Atlantic Ocean, 6th Street, Alton Road, Dade Boulevard, and 23rd Street in Miami Beach roughly bound it.

== Special events ==
=== Pool parties ===
The Surfcomber Hotel has become known for its pool parties, featuring DJs playing house, techno, garage, drum & bass, and electro music. The parties began in 2004 and are reportedly among some of the most anticipated parties each year in Miami Beach.

These events coincide with the Winter Music Conference, Ultra Music Festival, and the July 4th IndepenDANCE Pool Party. The 2011 IndepenDANCE party featured DJs Boris, Cocodrills, the Martinez Brothers, and Victor Calderone and was headlined by Fatboy Slim and Dirty South.

Other notable artists and DJs who have performed at the Surfcomber include Armin van Buuren, Sander Kleinenberg, Pete Tong, Donald Glaude, Steve Lawler, Kaskade, James Zabiela, Tiefschwarz, Chuckie, Afrojack, Joris Voorn, Nervo, Axwell, Benny Benassi, Avicii, Louis Puig, Miami-favorites Patrick M and Luis Puig of Club Space, Funkagenda, Wally López, and Cedric Gervais.

The Surfcomber hosted a special MMW takeover called Legendary House Music Week the same year.

=== 2005 MTV Video Movie Awards ===
During the lead-up to the Video Movie Awards (VMAs) in 2005, MTV took over the Surfcomber Hotel and transformed it into "Hotel MTV." On the Wednesday before the show, Diddy opened up Hotel MTV with a ribbon cutting and concert for the fans by the pool; however, the planned party had to be altered due to Hurricane Katrina. The storm caused the cancellation of all planned outdoor events at the hotel on the Thursday and Friday before the VMAs. The storm moved out of the area by Saturday and the festivities continued with artists such as Akon and The Bravery performing.

=== 2010 Super Bowl ===
During Super Bowl XLIV, the hotel underwent a temporary transformation when Bud Light assumed control and rebranded it as Bud Light Hotel South Beach. The entire property, from the hotel marquee to even the sugar packets, featured the logos and branding of Bud Light.
