= Jewish Museum of Florida =

The Jewish Museum of Florida-FIU
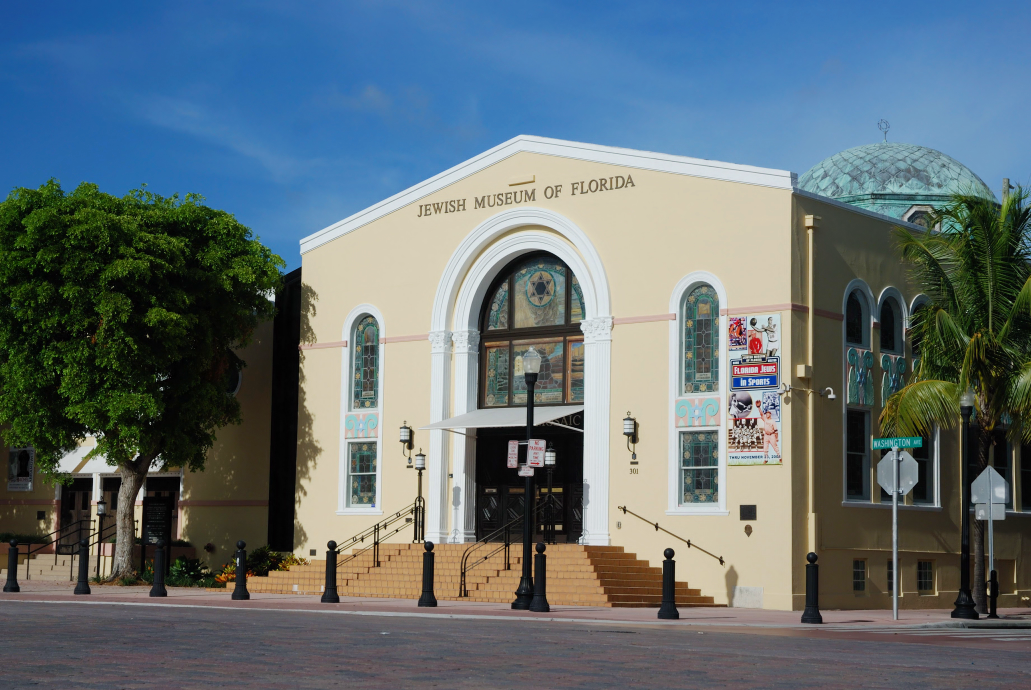

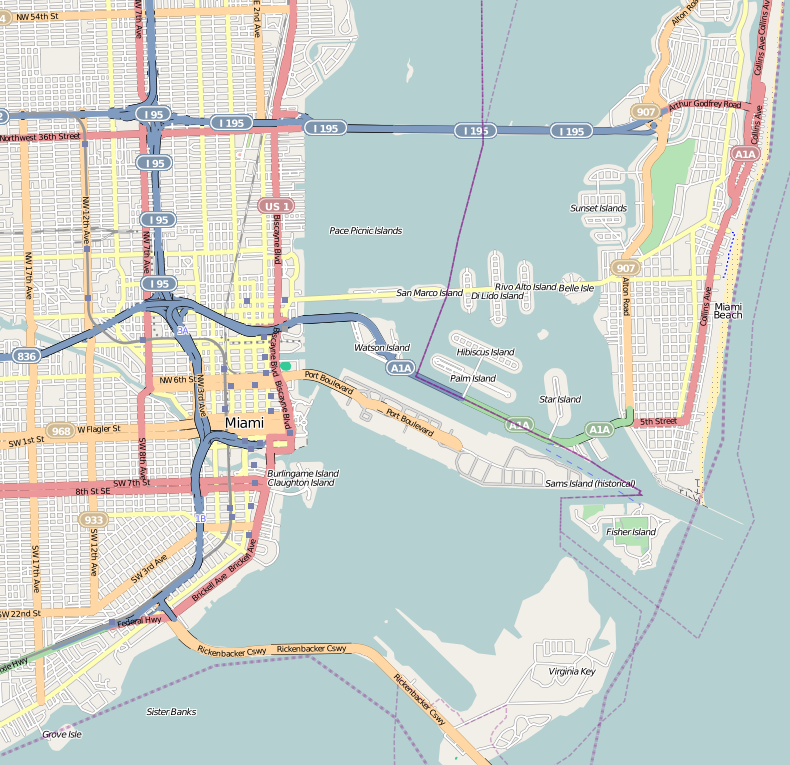
- Location within Miami Beach Jewish Museum of Florida (Florida)
- Established: 1936
- Location: 301 Washington Avenue; Miami Beach, Florida, United States
- Coordinates: 25.77242°N 80.13455°W
- Type: Jewish Heritage Museum
- Director: Jo Ann Arnowitz
- Website: jewishmuseum.com

The Jewish Museum of Florida is a museum that preserves Florida Jewish history, culture, and art and is located in two restored historic buildings that were formerly synagogues, at 301 & 311 Washington Ave., in Miami Beach, Florida. The main museum building, at 301 Washington Ave., was built in 1936, is on the National Register of Historic Places, has Art Deco features, a copper dome, a marble bimah, and 80 stained glass windows. The adjacent building located at 311 Washington, which served as Miami Beach's first synagogue, was purchased by the museum in 2005 and restored in 2007 as a museum expansion.

== Permanent collection ==
The museum's core exhibit, MOSAIC: Jewish Life in Florida, began as a traveling exhibit sponsored by the Judaic Studies program at the University of Miami, the Soref Jewish Community Center (Fort Lauderdale), and the Central Agency for Jewish Education, in association with the Florida Department of State and the Florida Endowment for the Humanities, and included an exhibit guidebook. It includes more than 500 photos and artifacts that depict the Jewish experience in Florida since 1763. The museum also has several temporary exhibits on display each year. The museum mounts and hosts its own and traveling exhibitions; sponsors cultural and educational programs; houses a Collections & Research Center reflecting Florida Jewish history since 1763; and communicates Jewish history, values, and issues to Jews and non-Jews alike in an informal manner.

== History ==
The museum is located in Miami Beach's first synagogue, the original home of Congregation Beth Jacob, was designed by architect H. Frasser Rose and built in 1929 at 311 Washington Avenue. The site was chosen because at the time the synagogue was built, Jews were concentrated in the south end of the city, due to restrictions on where they could reside.

Its construction satisfied an urgent need of the small Jewish community of residents and winter visitors who had first settled on Miami Beach in 1913. It established that Jews were accepted and a permanent part of the resident population of the City.

Prior to this, Jews had been denied permission to construct a synagogue. They had to ferry across Biscayne Bay (and later the County Causeway, now the MacArthur Causeway (Robert L. Shevin Memorial Way), built in 1920) to attend religious services at B'nai Zion Congregation in Miami. When Orthodox Jews, who do not travel on Shabbat and high holidays, joined the congregation, they and the winter visitors from Canada and Miami Beach residents held services in the Royal Apartments at 221 Collins Avenue. In 1924, Malvina Weiss Leibman organized and taught Sunday School classes in a vacant lot on the west side of Washington Avenue north of Third Street.

Beginning in 1926 and during construction of Beth Jacob, services were held on the roof of the David Court Apartments at 56 Washington Avenue, owned by the Granat family. The first rabbi was reportedly Rabbi David Yallow followed by Rabbis Hurowitz, Axelrod and David I. Rosenbloom. Rabbi Moses Mescheloff served the congregation from 1937 to 1954. In 1954, Rabbi Mescheloff went to Chicago, in time to celebrate Chanukah with his new congregation in West Rogers Park, Congregation K.I.N.S. (Knesset Israel Nusach Sfard). The congregation had a life contract with Rabbi Mescheloff, who became “Rabbi Emeritus” upon his retirement. Rabbi Mescheloff died in 2008 in Chicago. Subsequent spiritual leaders were Rabbis Akiva Chill, Tibor Stern (1955–65), Shmaryahu T. Swirsky (1965–92) and Moshe Berenholz.

Almost every Jew who was a permanent resident of Miami Beach between 1927 and 1932 was a member and financial contributor to the synagogue. The initial role of the Synagogue as the religious and social center of the Jewish community soon developed into being the Jewish cultural center as well. A Hebrew school was established, scholars, rabbis and cantors were invited and a mikvah (ritual bath for women) was built in 1944 for $35,000 ($640,000 in current dollar terms) at 151 Michigan Avenue.

The original building was dedicated on February 17, 1929. The founding officers were Lazarus Abramowitz, President; Jekuthiel Kaplan, Vice President; Morris Abraham, Treasurer; Samuel Guttman, Secretary; and Joseph Tilzer and Harry Levitt, building committee members.

In 1936, the congregation outgrew its original facility and constructed a second larger adjacent building for the synagogue at 301 Washington Avenue, designed by Miami Beach architect Henry Hohauser. The original building was used as the religious school and social hall. Faced in stucco, the two-story building has a rectangular plan and a gable roof. The central entrance consists of three double doors of simple, vertical panels and large iron hinges of Spanish style.

The top of the building façade has a contemporary plaque reading "Beth Jacob Social Hall, 5689-1929." The façade is crowned by the tablets with the Ten Commandments. Inside, the main hall is two stories in height.

A two-story addition of concrete block was built to the east in 1946, containing offices, meeting rooms, and classrooms.

Towards the end of the 20th century, Beth Jacob Congregation began to dwindle and moved all of its functions back to this original building. Many of its older members died. There were hardly enough members remaining to have a minyan (the ten men required for many parts of the religious services) and in 2005, the congregation went out of business. The Jewish Museum of Florida, which needed room to expand its facilities beyond the confines of the adjacent building it has occupied since 1995, purchased the original synagogue, ensuring that the building so rich in Jewish history will continue to be preserved and become a repository for the chronology of Florida's Jews.

The renovation of the 311 building was completed in 2007. The building has offices located upstairs in the former women's balcony on the west side. The area on the east side of the second floor, which was formerly the synagogue's classrooms, houses the Collections and Research area. The former sanctuary on the main level of the building was converted to a 2,400-square-foot (220 m^{2}) multi-purpose gallery which serves as a second exhibit venue for the museum and is also used for public programs and special events.

Museum Director Susan Gladstone is featured in The Last Resort, a 2018 documentary film about Jewish life in South Beach in the 1960s, 70s and 80s.

== Collection ==
The museum's collection comprises more than 100,000 artifacts, objects, photographs, documents, and religious objects relating to Florida Jewish heritage.
