= Beth Jacob Social Hall and Congregation =

- U.S. National Register of Historic Places
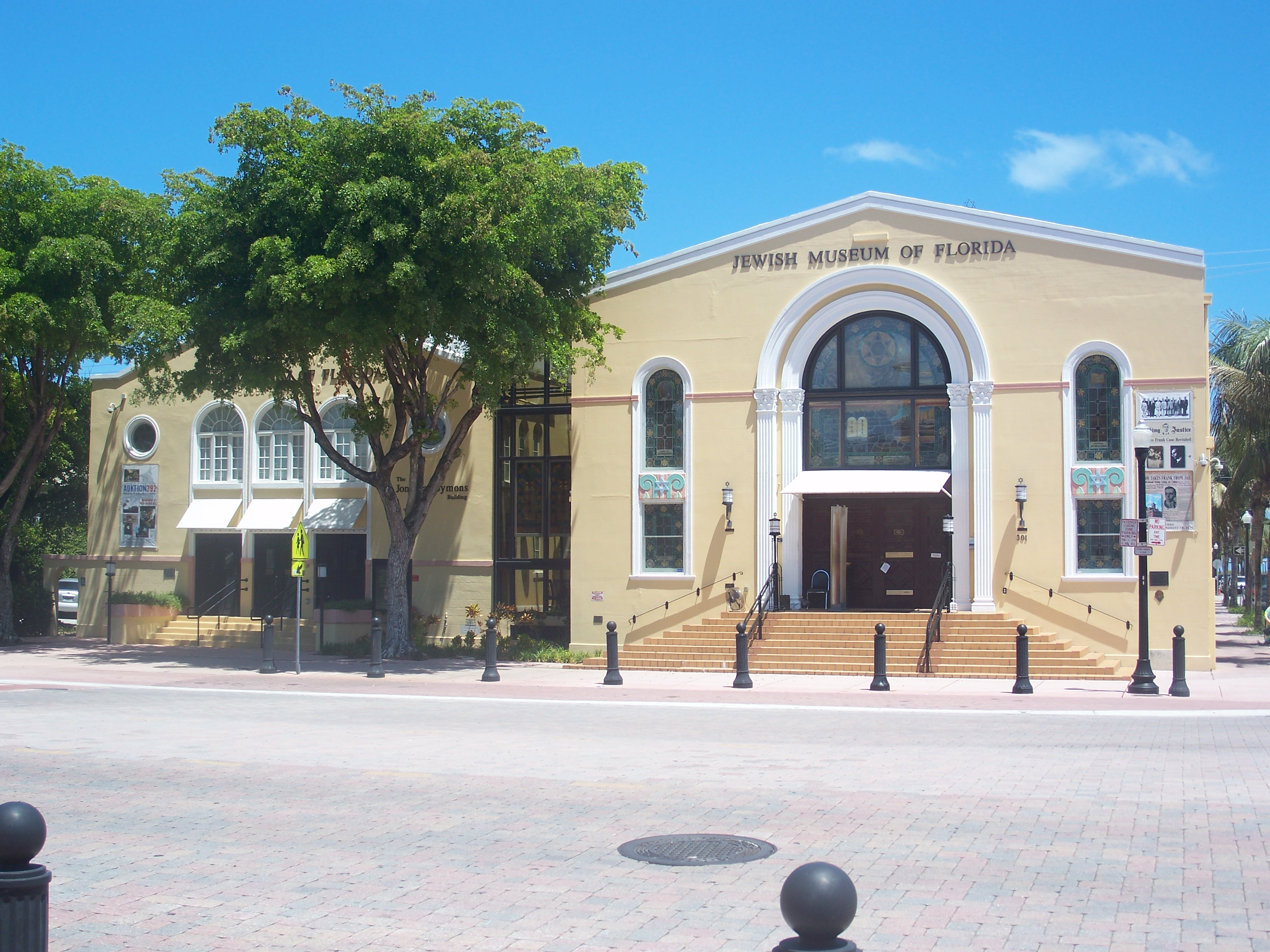

- Location within Miami Location within Florida Location within the United States
- Location: 301 and 311 Washington Ave., Miami Beach, Florida
- Coordinates: 25°46′20″N 80°8′4″W
- Built: 1928
- Architect: A. Fraser Rose, Henry Hohauser
- Architectural style: Art Deco
- NRHP reference No.: 80000946
- Added to NRHP: October 16, 1980

The Beth Jacob Social Hall and Congregation (also known as the Beth Jacob Synagogue) was the first synagogue in Miami Beach, Florida. It is located at 301 and 311 Washington Avenue. The building at 311 was built in 1929 and designed by A. Fraser Rose. The building at 301 was built in 1936 and was designed by Henry Hohauser. On October 16, 1980, it was added to the U.S. National Register of Historic Places. It is no longer a synagogue, but houses the Jewish Museum of Florida.
