= Henry Hohauser =

American architect (1895–1963)

Henry Hohauser (May 27, 1895, in New York, New York – March 31, 1963, in Lawrence, New York) was an architect in Miami Beach, Florida. He is known for his Art Deco architecture stylings, and is listed as a "Great Floridian"; in 1993, he was ranked as one of the 100 most influential people in South Florida history by The Miami Herald.

Hohauser studied at the Pratt Institute in Brooklyn, New York, then he came to Florida in 1932. Features of his work include symmetry on the front elevation, Art Deco stylings such as a ziggurat or stepped roofline, glass bricks, curved edges, and neon lighting.

The show American Experience called Hohauser and L. Murray Dixon the principal architects of Deco South Beach, including "streamlined curves, jutting towers, window "eyebrows," and neon." Such buildings were less expensive and less ornamented than those by Carl Fisher, such as the Flamingo (building) and "seemed perfectly suited to a city created for sun, sand, and relaxation." His work was low cost in order to serve the middle class tourists. He designed more than 300 homes, apartment buildings, hotels, stores, restaurants and theaters. Many now are protected by the Miami Art Deco Preservation Society's efforts, particularly the efforts of Barbara Baer Capitman.

== Work in Miami Beach ==
- The Liberty Arm Hotel (1939), 236 21st Street in Miami Beach, renamed South Beach Hotel
- The Novick (1937), 610 Jefferson Avenue in Miami Beach
- The Cardozo Hotel (1939), 1300 Ocean Drive in Miami Beach
- The Colony (1935), 736 Ocean Drive, one of the early buildings erected during the Art Deco renaissance
- The Century Hotel (1939), 140 Ocean Drive in Miami Beach
- The Governor Hotel (1939), 435 21st Street in Miami Beach
- The Park Central Hotel (1937), 640 Ocean Drive, Miami Beach
- The Essex House Hotel (1938), 1001 Collins Avenue in Miami Beach
- The Edison Hotel (1935), 960 Ocean Drive in Miami Beach
- The Riveria Arms Condo, 732 Euclid Ave, Miami Beach
- The Crescent (1941), 1420 Ocean Drive in Miami Beach
- The Davis (1941), formerly the Park Washington Resort, a collection of four hotels: the Davis, Taft, Belaire and Kenmore
- Collins Plaza (1936), 318 20th Street in Miami Beach, renovated and renamed Riviera Suites
- The Greystone Hotel (1939), 1920 Collins Avenue in Miami Beach, renovated and renamed the Greystone Miami Beach
- Collins Park Hotel (1939), 2000 Park Avenue in Miami Beach
- Neron Hotel (1940), 1110 Drexel Avenue in Miami Beach, demolished in 1982
- Beth Jacob Social Hall and Congregation with H. Frasser Rose at 301 and 311 Washington Avenue in Miami Beach, listed on the National Register of Historic Places, currently the Jewish Museum of Florida-FIU
- The Parc Vendome (1936), 736 13th Street in Miami Beach
- 1020 6th Street Apartments in Miami Beach
- 5363 LaGorce Drive in Miami Beach
- 1610–1612 Pennsylvania Avenue in Miami Beach
- LeMar Hotel( 1937), 236 9th Street in Miami Beach
- 530-550 15th Street Apartments (1938) in Miami Beach

=== Gallery ===
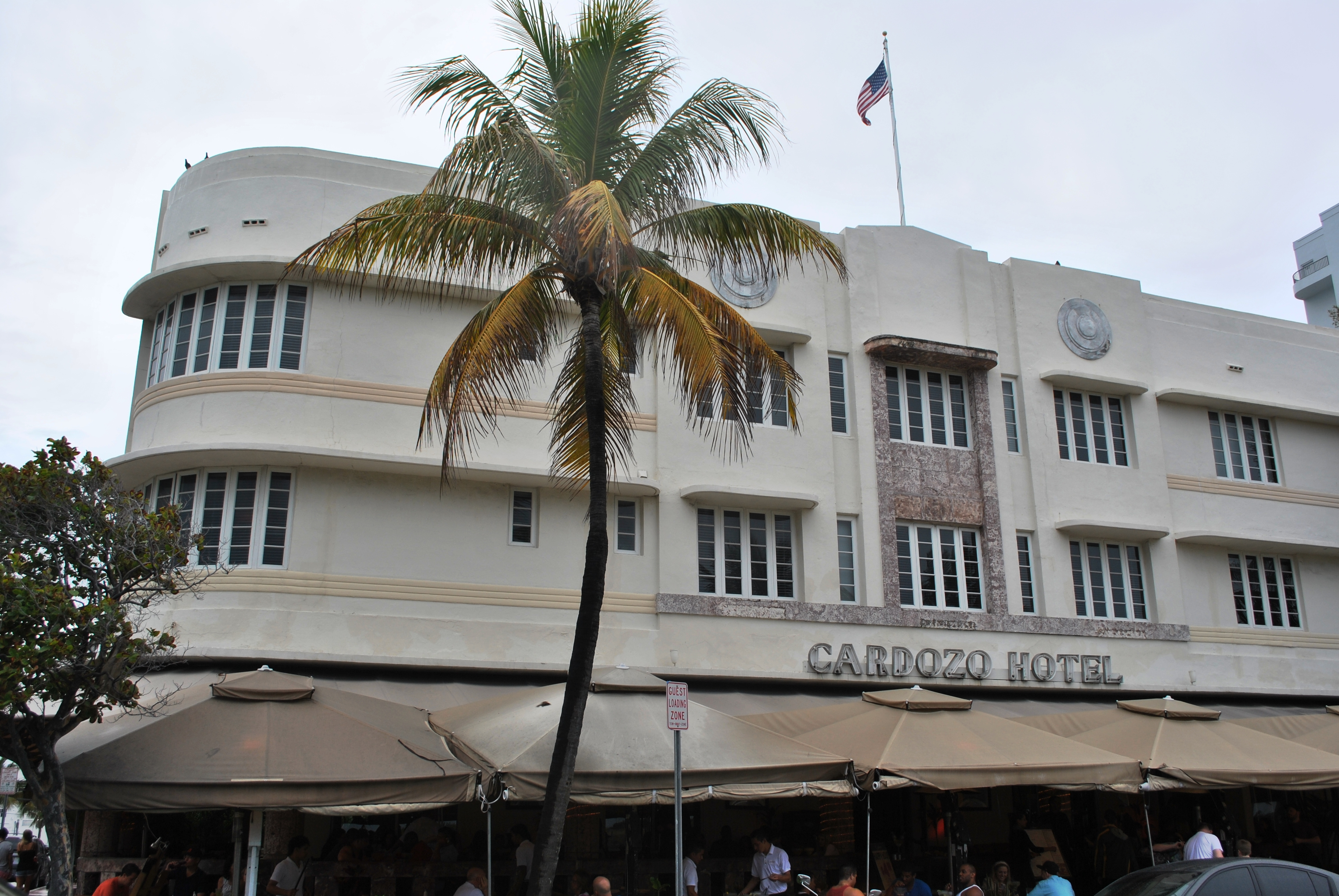
Cardozo (Henry Hohauser, 1939)

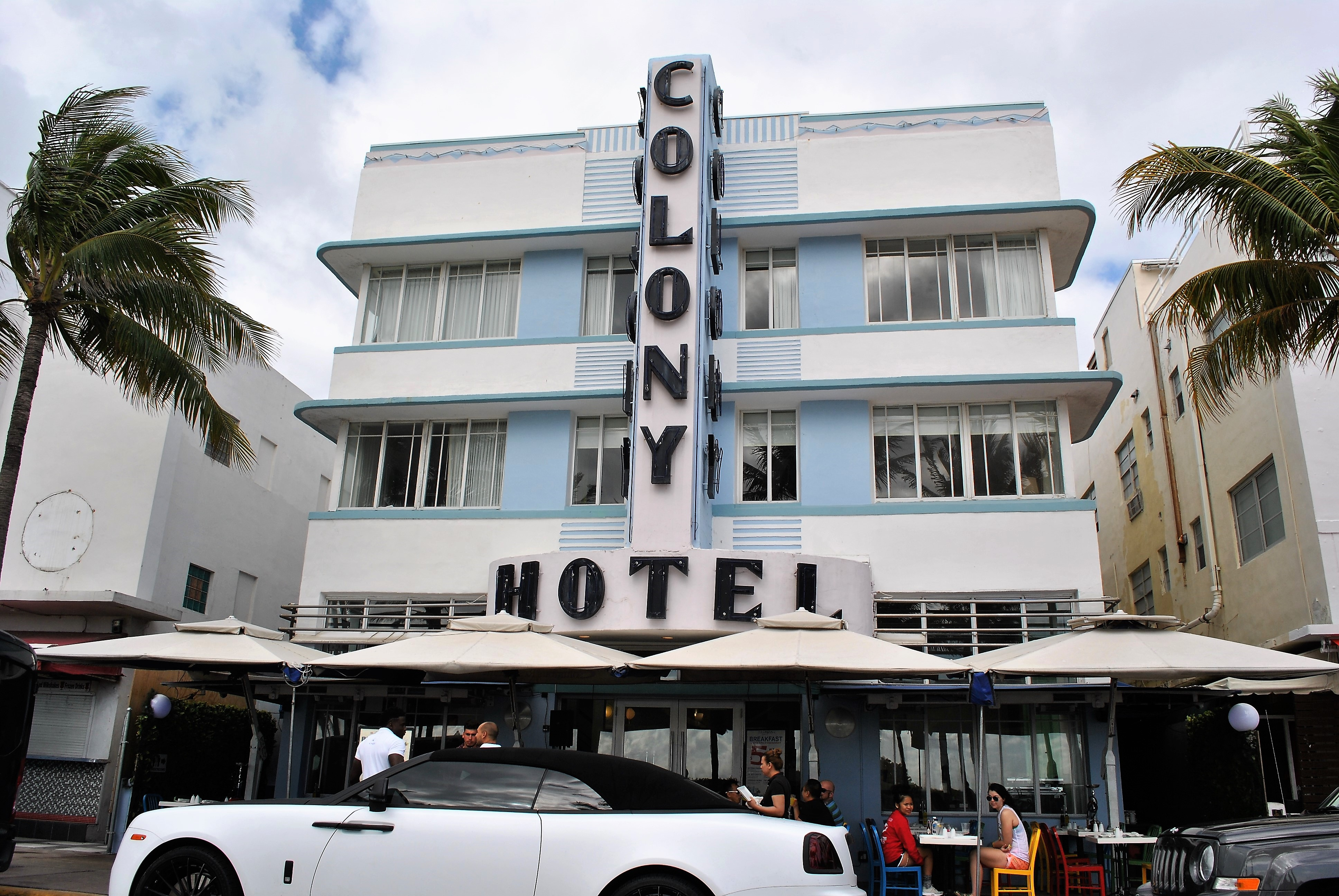
Colony (Henry Hohauser, 1935)

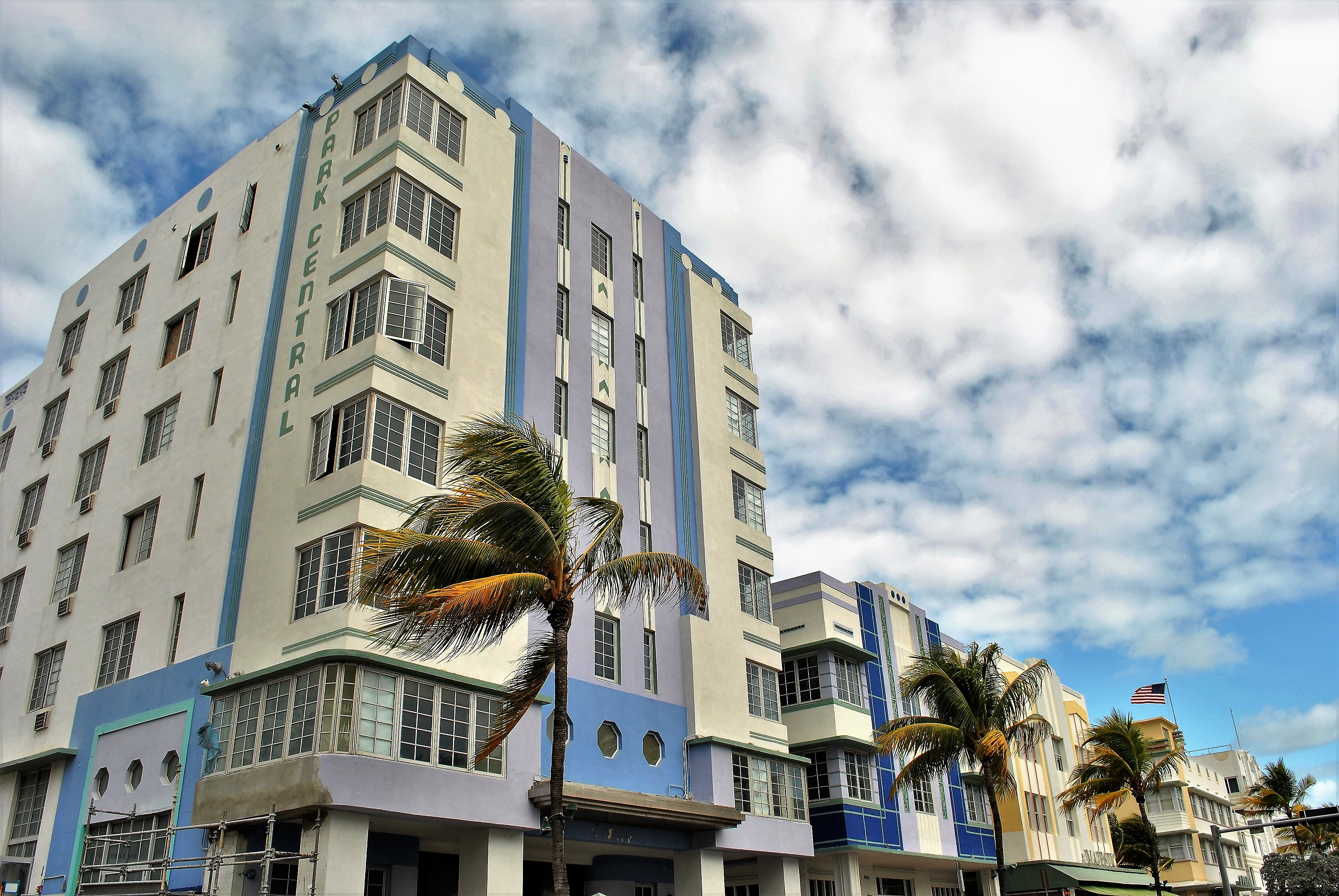
Park Central (Henry Hohauser, 1937)

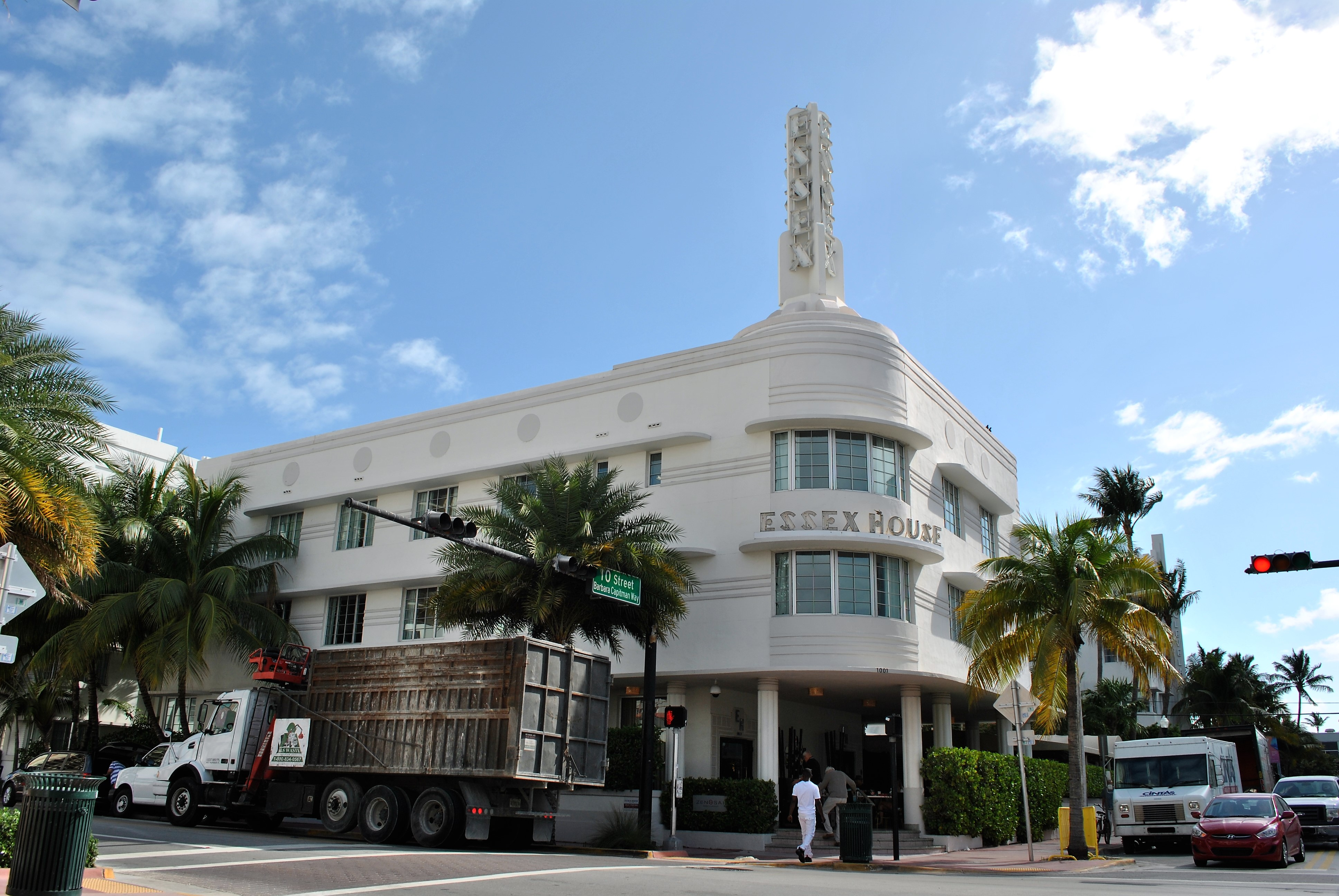
Essex House (Henry Hohauser, 1938)

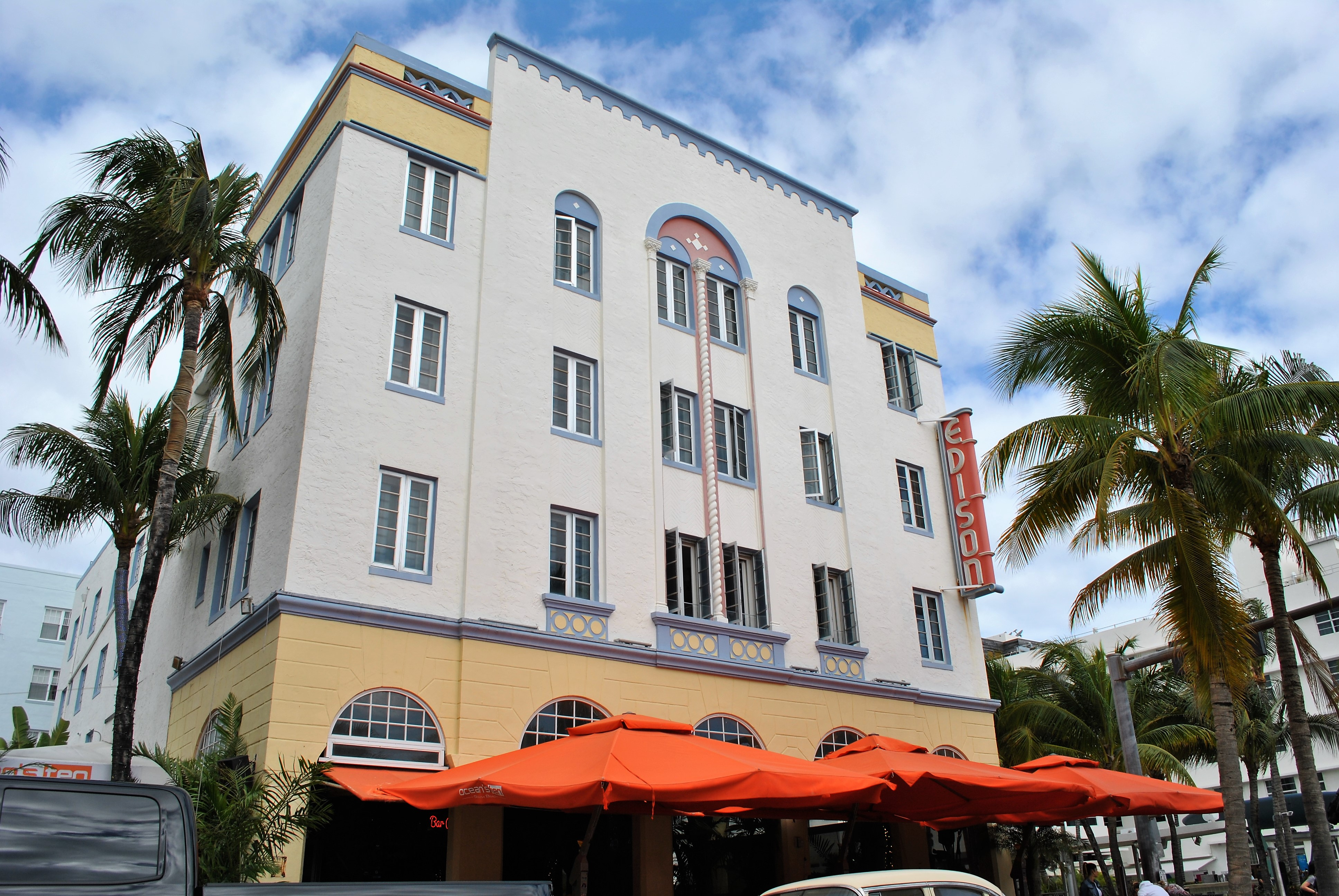
Edison (Henry Hohauser, 1935)

Greystone Hotel, photographed in 1980

Greystone Hotel, photographed in 1980

== Other work ==
- Houses in the Far Rockaway Beach Bungalow Historic District (1921) in Far Rockaway, Queens
