= Fort Harrison (disambiguation) =

Fort Harrison was a Confederate fort built to defend Richmond, Virginia during the American Civil War.

Fort Harrison may also refer to:

- Fort Harrison, Indiana, an American fort built near present-day Terre Haute in 1811
- Fort Harrison, Florida, a U.S. military outpost that operated on the west coast of Florida during the Second Seminole War
- Fort Benjamin Harrison, U.S. Army post in Marion County, Indiana
- Fort William Henry Harrison, a National Guard post in Montana
- Daniel Harrison House, Rockingham County, Virginia, designated by the legislature as Fort Harrison during the French and Indian War

== See also ==
- Fort Harrison Hotel, part of the headquarters for the Church of Scientology in Clearwater, Florida
- Fort Harrison State Park, Indiana State Park, located near and named for Fort Benjamin Harrison
- Fort Harrison National Cemetery, cemetery near Richmond, Virginia
