= Capitol Theatre (Clearwater, Florida) =

Historic theater in Clearwater, Florida, US

Coordinates: 27.96547°N 82.80095°W

Bilheimer Capitol Theatre
- Full name: Nancy and David Bilheimer Capitol Theatre
- Former names: Capitol Theatre (1921-80; 2001-19); Royalty Theatre (1981-2001)
- Address: 405 Cleveland St; Clearwater, FL 33755
- Location: Downtown Clearwater
- Owner: City of Clearwater
- Capacity: 766

Construction
- Groundbreaking: December 6, 1920
- Opened: March 21, 1921
- Renovated: 1962; 1981; 1999-2000; 2011; 2012-13
- Cost: $160,000 ($2.57 million in 2025 dollars)
- Architect: Lester Avery
- General contractors: John and Ivan Phillipoff

Website
- Venue Website
- Building details

General information
- Renovated: December 2012-December 2013
- Renovation cost: $11 million ($15.4 million in 2025 dollars)

Renovating team
- Architects: Fowler & Associates
- Main contractor: Creative Contractors

The Bilheimer Capitol Theatre (formerly known as the Capitol Theatre and Royalty Theatre) is a historic theater in Clearwater, Florida. It is one of the six venues that compose the Richard B. Baumgardner Center for the Performing Arts. The theater has a seating capacity of 750 people.

The theater is owned by the City of Clearwater and managed by Ruth Eckerd Hall. It opened in 1921 for vaudeville and movies. After it struggled economically, it was renamed the Royalty Theatre. It was restored in 1999-2000 and reopened. It was bought by the City of Clearwater in 2008 and run by Ruth Eckerd Hall for acts such as the punk rock group Henry Rollins, comedian Steven Wright and singer Richard Marx. In 2013, the City of Clearwater launched an elaborate $11 million restoration of the theater as part of a broader downtown revitalization. The theater reopened in 2014 to much acclaim and financial success. Since the reopening that theater has played host to acts such as Jay Leno and B.B. King.

== History ==
Described as an "artistic little theater", the building was commissioned by John Stansel Taylor. Construction began December 1920, with the theater opening three months later, with a screening of Dinty. Upon opening, it was advertised as having the best natural acoustics in the southeastern US. Along with showing films, the theater also hosted various vaudeville acts in the 20s and 30s. In 1922, a Robert Morton Wicks Opus 415 Organ was installed however, it was later believed to be removed during renovations, following damaged obtained during Hurricane Donna.

Following a decline in popularity, the building was leased by Bill Neville and Jerry Strain in 1979. Together, they formed the Sunshine State Theater Company and reopened the theater in January 1980. The reopening was a mild success, unfortunately, the theater shut down on October 28, 1980. A few months later, the Royalty Theater Company took over the lease, renamed the venue and began a massive renovation. During these renovation, the body of Bill Neville was found in the balcony. The venue reopened in December 1981 as the Royalty Theatre, with a production of Oliver!.

Predominately showcasing live productions, the theater faced another decline in the early 90s. In 1995, the Taylor Estate sold the building to Accents Craft. Until 1999, the building was used as a social hall, featuring events geared for the youth of Clearwater. In 1999, the Clearwater City Commission attempted to purchase the theater but this effort failed. Accents Craft owner Larry Joe Cotton sold the building to Socrates Charos. Charos spent nearly two years renovating the building, converting it to a religious center, restoring its former name. The theater struggled for many years, nearly facing foreclosure in 2008. At this time, the City Commission voted to purchase the building from Charos, with the effort being successful. During this time, the City also recognized the theater's importance to the city's history, awarding it a Historic Designation.

In March 2019, Ruth Eckerd Hall announced a $2.5 million gift from Nancy and David Bilheimer as part of the theater's ongoing “Expanding the Experience” fundraising campaign. In recognition of the generous donation, the Capitol Theatre in downtown Clearwater is now called The Nancy and David Bilheimer Capitol Theatre.

== Noted performers ==
- Adrian Belew
- B.B. King
- Christopher Cross
- Clint Black
- David Archuleta
- Don McLean
- Engelbert Humperdinck
- Extreme
- Gallagher
- George Benson
- Jackie Evancho
- Janis Ian
- Jim Brickman
- Johnny Winter
- Judy Collins
- Kansas
- Kenny G
- Kris Kristofferson
- Leon Russell
- Lucinda Williams
- Michael Bolton
- Michael McDonald
- Pure Prairie League
- Stryper
- The Righteous Brothers
- Tony Orlando
- Wynonna Judd
