= Moccasin Lake Nature Park =

Park and nature preserve in Florida

- Location within Florida Location within the United States
- Type: Nature preserve
- Location: Clearwater, Florida
- Coordinates: 27.9757°N 82.7234°W
- Area: 54 acres (22 ha)
- Opened: August 7, 1982
- Operator: City of Clearwater
- Status: Open

Moccasin Lake Nature Park is a 54-acre park and nature preserve located at 2750 Park Trail Lane in Clearwater, Florida. Opened on August 7, 1982, the park features trails, boardwalks, an interpretive center, a sanctuary for birds of prey, a playground, a butterfly garden and turtle pond, and the man-made lake for which the park is named. Pets, with the exception of guide or assistance dogs, and fishing are prohibited in the park.

== History ==
Prior to its conception, Moccasin Lake Nature Park was a wetland wilderness area that was being considered for use as a space for low-income housing, before the City of Clearwater decided to turn it into a nature preserve. The lake for which the park is named was a result of the construction of the nearby U.S. Route 19 in the early 20th century, when engineers removed large amounts of dirt to build an embankment to form an overpass between Florida State Road 590 and Drew Street; the pit that remained filled with rainwater and became Moccasin Lake. During its development, Moccasin Lake Nature Park was vandalized several times. The park opened to the public on Saturday, August 7, 1982; between 800 and 1,000 people visited the park in its opening weekend.

In 1983, analysis of water samples taken from Moccasin Lake found deficient levels of oxygen, which can lead to fish kill. In May 1984, the City of Clearwater installed a $2,000 water aeration system to increase the lake's oxygen levels.

== Raptor Sanctuary ==
Located in the park is Moccasin Lake Raptor Sanctuary, an area that houses various injured, human-dependent, or otherwise non-releasable birds of prey in enclosures. Among the sanctuary's residents are Elvis, a black vulture from Homosassa that imprinted on humans and was adopted by the sanctuary in 1987; Penelope, a bald eagle; Lulu, a great horned owl; and Sunshine, a swallow-tailed kite.
