= Lester Avery =

American architect

Lester Avery was an architect in the United States. Avery began his career in Clearwater and is known for his Mid-Century Modern architecture apartment buildings in Miami and ranch style home designs with angled, flat roofs and merging wings. He expanded Lawrence Murray Dixon's The Temple House in Miami's South Beach area. Avery was the architect of Clearwater, Florida's Capitol Theatre (Clearwater, Florida), opened March 21, 1921. It was built by Senator-elect John Stansel Taylor and the contractor was John D. Phillipoff. He also designed the Jackie Gleason House (1959) at 2232 Alton Road in Miami.

Avery was arrested in Clearwater for culpable negligence in the death of his father, Lester Avery Sr., who had served as U.S. consul to Nicaragua. Avery and has wife had taken a trip to Miami and were accused of leaving Avery's father without food or care, precipitating his death. Avery was 35 and already an accomplished architect in the city. Avery's style for residential architecture was characterized by one-story ranch designs with angled, flat top roofs and merging wings. He designed The Schubert Hotel and the Panama Club (Fort Lauderdale, Florida).

== Works ==
- Temple House, 1960s expansion to convert it into a temple. Originally constructed as a home in 1933 it was converted back into a home in 2003.
- 817 Ponce De Leon Drive, Rio Vista Isles A Mid-Century Modern home.
- Razel Apartments (1955), a stucco apartment complex with a flat roof designed in the Miami Modern (MiMo) Garden Style architecture. Built by Elco Builders. Symmetrical facades, open-air balconies and catwalks organized around a central open courtyard. Listed on the Miami Beach Architectural District in 1979 and the Ocean Drive/Collins Avenue District in 1986.
- J. S. McNaulty House (1918) at 318 Druid in Clearwater
- Gulf Oil Station (Miami, Florida) (1938) at 1700 SW 22nd Street, with Curtis E. Haley from a prototype by Russell Pancoast. Designed with Art Deco and Mediterranean Revival architecture features, the station was constructed before the standardization of gas service station architecture. It includes columns supporting the canopies over the gas pumps. Gulf Oil Company built several stations in the Miami area based on architect Russell Pancoast's prototype, but this is the only surviving example.
- 229 NE 101 ST, Miami Shores
- The Schubert Resort (1953)
- 4750 North Bay Road, Miami Beach
- 3330 Flamingo Drive, Miami Beach
- 927 Coral Way, Coral Gables
- 1430 NE 15th Ave, Ft Lauderdale
- 1247 Anastasia Avenue, Coral Gables
