= Clearwater, Florida =

- City
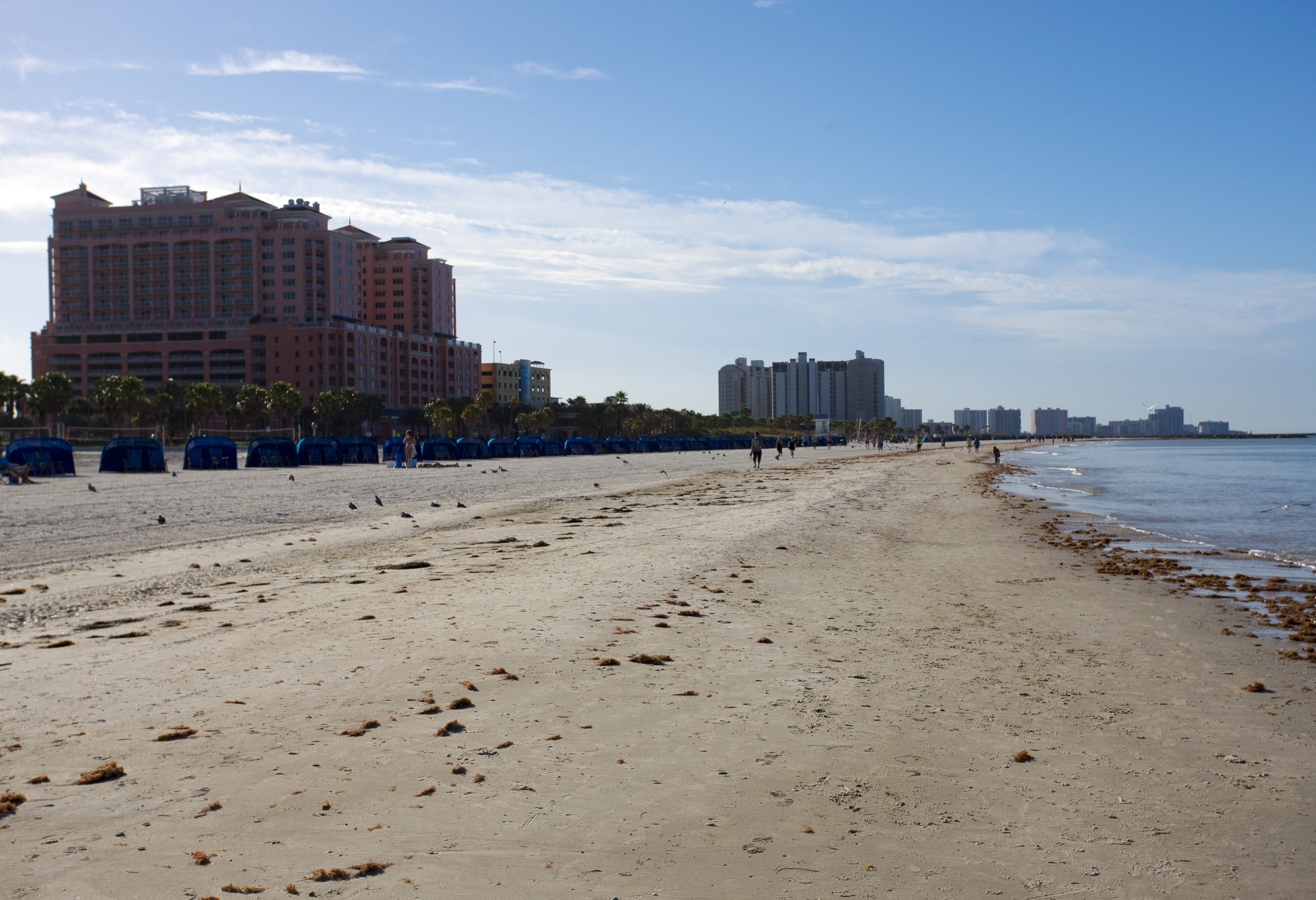
- Clearwater Beach in June 2022

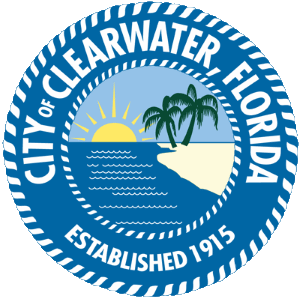
- Seal
- Motto: "Bright and Beautiful•Bay to Beach"
- Interactive map of Clearwater, Florida
- Location in Florida Location in the United States
- Coordinates: 27°57′56″N 82°48′0″W
- Country: United States
- State: Florida
- County: Pinellas
- Settled (Clear Water Harbor): 1888; 138 years ago
- Incorporated (Town of Clear Water Harbor): 1891; 135 years ago
- Reincorporated (City of Clearwater): May 27, 1915; 111 years ago

Government
  - Type: Council-Manager

Area
  - City: 35.92 sq mi (93.04 km^{2})
  - Land: 26.13 sq mi (67.68 km^{2})
  - Water: 9.79 sq mi (25.36 km^{2})
- Elevation: 66 ft (20 m)

Population (2020)
  - City: 117,292
  - Density: 4,488.6/sq mi (1,733.06/km^{2})
  - Metro: 2,783,243
- Time zone: UTC-05:00 (EST)
  - Summer (DST): UTC-04:00 (EDT)
- ZIP Codes: 33755–33767, 33769
- Area code: 727
- FIPS code: 12-12875
- Website: myclearwater.com

Clearwater is a city in and the county seat of Pinellas County, Florida, United States, west of Tampa and north of St. Petersburg. To the west of Clearwater lies the Gulf of Mexico and to the southeast lies Tampa Bay. As of the 2020 census, the city had a population of 117,292. It is the smallest of the three principal cities in the Tampa–St. Petersburg–Clearwater metropolitan area, most commonly referred to as the Tampa Bay area.

Clearwater Beach is part of the city of Clearwater, but is separated from it by the Intracoastal Waterway. Cleveland Street is one of the city's historic avenues, and the city includes BayCare Ballpark and Coachman Park.

The Church of Scientology owns the majority of property in the Clearwater downtown core district.

== History ==
Present-day Clearwater was originally the home of the Tocobaga people. Around 1835, the United States Army began construction of Fort Harrison, named after William Henry Harrison, as an outpost during the Seminole Wars. The fort was located on a bluff overlooking Clearwater Harbor, which later became part of an early 20th-century residential development called Harbor Oaks. University of South Florida archaeologists excavated the site in 1962 after Mark Wyllie discovered an underground ammunition bunker while planting a tree in his yard.

The area's population grew after the Federal Armed Occupation Act of 1842 offered 160 acres (0.65 km^{2}) to anyone who would bear arms and cultivate the land. Early settlers included the Stevens, Stevenson, Sever and McMullen families, who claimed and farmed large tracts of land. Prior to 1906, the area was known as Clear Water Harbor. The name "Clear Water" is thought to have come from a fresh water spring flowing from near where the old City Hall building was located. There were many other freshwater springs that dotted the bluff, many in the bay or harbor itself.

Originally part of Hillsborough County, the first road joining Clearwater and Tampa was built in 1849, which dramatically reduced the prior day-long commute between the cities.

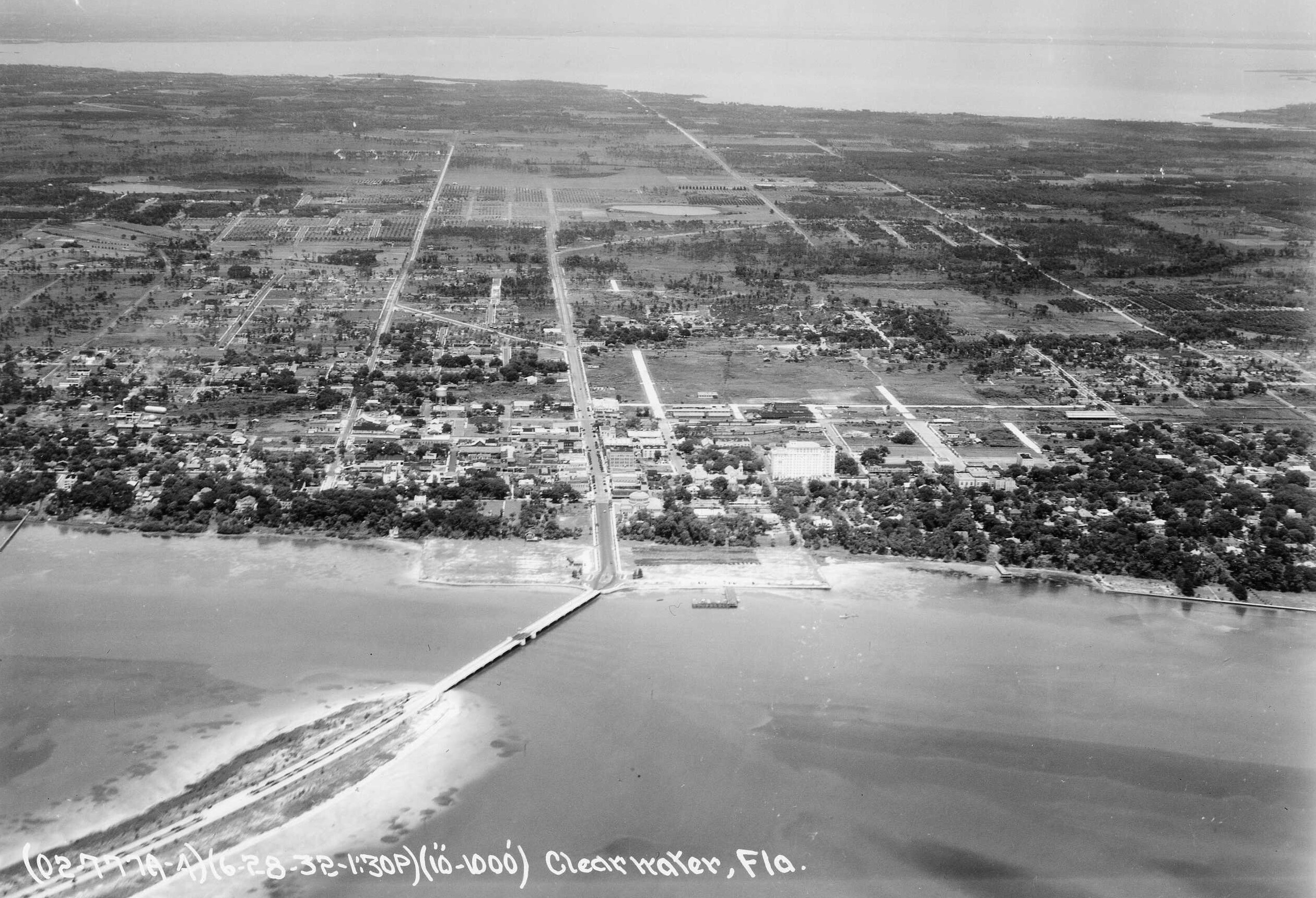
Clearwater in 1932

During the American Civil War, Union gunboats repeatedly raided the community's supplies, as most of the able-bodied men were away fighting for the Confederate Army. The town began developing in the late nineteenth century, prompted by Peter Demens' completion of the first passenger railroad line into the city in 1888. Clearwater was incorporated in 1891, with James E. Crane becoming the first mayor. The area's popularity as a vacation destination grew after railroad magnate Henry B. Plant built a sprawling Victorian resort hotel named Belleview Biltmore just south of Clearwater in 1897.

By the early 1900s, Clearwater's population had grown to around 400, ballooning to nearly 1,000 in the winter. Clearwater's oldest existing newspaper, the Clearwater Sun, was first published on March 14, 1914 (and ran until 1989). Clearwater was reincorporated, this time as a city, on May 27, 1915, and was designated the county seat for Pinellas County, which broke from Hillsborough County in 1912. In 1915, a bridge was built across Clearwater Harbor, joining the city with Clearwater Beach to the west. Clearwater Beach, although located on a separate barrier island, belongs to the city of Clearwater and fronts the Gulf of Mexico. A new, much higher bridge now arcs over the bay, replacing the former drawbridge; the connecting road is part of State Road 60 and is called Clearwater Memorial Causeway.

During World War II, Clearwater became a major training base for US troops destined for Europe and the Pacific. Virtually every hotel in the area, including the Belleview Biltmore and the Fort Harrison Hotel, was used as a barracks for new recruits. Vehicle traffic was regularly stopped for companies of soldiers marching through downtown, and nighttime blackouts to confuse potential enemy bombers were common practice. Pre-development Sand Key was used as a target by U.S. Army Air Corps fighter-bombers for strafing and bombing practice.

=== Timeline ===
- 1888
  - Settlement of Clear Water Harbor founded.
  - "Narrow-gauge railroad" begins operating.
- 1891 – Town of Clear Water Harbor incorporated.
- 1894 – Orange Belt Railroad begins operating.
- 1897 – Belleview Hotel in business in nearby Belleair.
- 1900 – Population: 343.
- 1905 – Population: 610.
- 1906 – Clear Water Harbor renamed "Clearwater".
- 1911 – Clearwater Yacht Club formed.
- 1912 – Clearwater designated seat of newly created Pinellas County.
- 1914
  - Clearwater Evening Sun newspaper begins publication.
  - Tampa and Gulf Coast Railroad begins operating.
- 1915 – City of Clearwater incorporated.
- 1916 – Public library and bridge to Clearwater Beach built.
- 1918 – Pinellas County Courthouse built.
- 1920 – Population: 2,427.
- 1921 – Capitol Theatre in business.
- 1923 – Peace Memorial Church built.
- 1926 – Fort Harrison Hotel rebuilt.
- 1930 – Population: 7,607.
- 1948 – WTAN radio begins broadcasting.
- 1950 – Population: 15,581.
- 1953 – Palm Drive-In cinema in business.
- 1959 – WAZE radio begins broadcasting.
- 1970 – Population: 52,074.
- 1972 – Marine Science Center established.
- 1976
  - Church of Scientology headquartered in Clearwater.
  - Countryside Six cinema in business.
- 1978 – May 4: Tornado occurs.
- 1980 – Population: 85,170.
- 1984 – Regional Pinellas Suncoast Transit Authority formed.
- 1998 – City website online (approximate date).
- 2004 – Clearwater Public Library new building opens.
- 2005 – Clearwater Memorial Causeway opens.
- 2010 – Population: 107,685.
- 2012 – George Cretekos becomes mayor.
- 2013 – Church of Scientology's Super Power Building dedicated.
- 2017 – Charlie Crist becomes U.S. representative for Florida's 13th congressional district.
- 2018 – The shooting of Markeis McGlockton receives national attention and triggers a debate regarding stand-your-ground laws.

== Geography ==
According to the United States Census Bureau, the city has a total area of 39.2 square miles (101.6 km^{2}), of which 25.6 square miles (66.2 km^{2}) is land and 13.7 square miles (35.4 km^{2}) (34.86%) is water.

=== Climate ===
Clearwater has a humid subtropical climate. Clearwater is far enough south that it lies in the broad transition zone from subtropical to tropical climates. As such, Clearwater is mostly warm to hot year round, with few nights of frost. Most of the annual rainfall comes in the wet season (June through September), when daily thundershowers erupt due to the strong solar heating. The dry season starts in October and runs through May, at which time the weather is sunny, dry, and there is little change in daily weather.

Climate data for Clearwater
Month	Jan	Feb	Mar	Apr	May	Jun	Jul	Aug	Sep	Oct	Nov	Dec	Year
Record high °F (°C)	86 (30)	87 (31)	89 (32)	92 (33)	97 (36)	97 (36)	96 (36)	96 (36)	95 (35)	94 (34)	89 (32)	87 (31)	97 (36)
Mean daily maximum °F (°C)	71.4 (21.9)	71.4 (21.9)	76.1 (24.5)	81.2 (27.3)	86.2 (30.1)	89.1 (31.7)	89.9 (32.2)	90.0 (32.2)	88.5 (31.4)	83.6 (28.7)	76.4 (24.7)	71.9 (22.2)	81.3 (27.4)
Daily mean °F (°C)	62.3 (16.8)	62.3 (16.8)	66.9 (19.4)	71.9 (22.2)	77.2 (25.1)	80.9 (27.2)	82.1 (27.8)	82.1 (27.8)	80.7 (27.1)	75.1 (23.9)	67.2 (19.6)	62.8 (17.1)	72.6 (22.6)
Mean daily minimum °F (°C)	52.9 (11.6)	53.2 (11.8)	57.8 (14.3)	62.7 (17.1)	68.2 (20.1)	72.6 (22.6)	74.2 (23.4)	74.2 (23.4)	72.9 (22.7)	66.5 (19.2)	58.1 (14.5)	53.7 (12.1)	63.9 (17.7)
Record low °F (°C)	24 (−4)	27 (−3)	29 (−2)	41 (5)	53 (12)	60 (16)	62 (17)	65 (18)	61 (16)	45 (7)	27 (−3)	19 (−7)	19 (−7)
Average precipitation inches (cm)	2 (5.1)	3.5 (8.9)	3.5 (8.9)	2 (5.1)	2.1 (5.3)	6.2 (16)	9.5 (24)	9.5 (24)	7.2 (18)	2.8 (7.1)	1.8 (4.6)	2.5 (6.4)	52.6 (134)
Average precipitation days	7	7	6	4	6	12	15	17	12	6	6	6	104
Mean monthly sunshine hours	217	197.75	279	300	310	270	279	248	240	248	210	186	2,984.75
Percentage possible sunshine	66.0	62.5	75.0	77.5	74.1	64.7	65.7	61.1	65.0	69.6	64.8	57.7	67.0
Source 1: Weatherbase
Source 2: Weather Atlas

== Demographics ==
Historical population
Census	Pop.	Note	%±
1900	383		—
1910	1,171		205.7%
1920	2,427		107.3%
1930	7,607		213.4%
1940	10,136		33.2%
1950	15,581		53.7%
1960	34,653		122.4%
1970	52,074		50.3%
1980	85,170		63.6%
1990	98,669		15.8%
2000	108,787		10.3%
2010	107,685		−1.0%
2020	117,292		8.9%
Source:1900-2010

=== 2020 census ===
Clearwater, Florida – Racial and ethnic composition Note: the US Census treats Hispanic/Latino as an ethnic category. This table excludes Latinos from the racial categories and assigns them to a separate category. Hispanics/Latinos may be of any race.
Race / Ethnicity (NH=Non-Hispanic)	Pop 2000	Pop 2010	Pop 2020	% 2000	% 2010	% 2020
White (NH)	85,015	76,536	75,773	78.15%	71.07%	64.60%
Black or African American (NH)	10,361	11,267	11,806	9.52%	10.46%	10.07%
Native American or Alaska Native (NH)	220	234	214	0.20%	0.22%	0.18%
Asian (NH)	1,757	2,255	3,355	1.62%	2.09%	2.86%
Pacific Islander or Native Hawaiian (NH)	68	124	152	0.06%	0.12%	0.13%
Some other race (NH)	168	219	609	0.15%	0.20%	0.52%
Mixed race or Multiracial (NH)	1,444	1,805	4,942	1.33%	1.68%	4.21%
Hispanic or Latino (any race)	9,754	15,245	20,441	8.97%	14.16%	17.43%
Total	108,787	107,685	117,292	100.00%	100.00%	100.00%

As of the 2020 United States census, there were 117,292 people, 48,211 households, and 27,233 families residing in the city.

In 2019, the city's population was spread out, with 18.7% under the age of 18, 59.4% between the age of 18 and 64, and 21.9% who were 65 years of age or older.

Between 2014 and 2018, the median income for a household in the city was $47,070, and the median income for a family was $46,228. 15.9% of the population fell below the poverty line.

As of the 2010 United States census, there were 107,685 people, 46,264 households, and 26,317 families residing in the city.

=== Languages ===
As of 2000, speakers of English as their first language were 84.43% of residents, Spanish as a mother tongue was 8.55%, Greek accounted for 1.16%, French made up 1.00% of speakers, German at 0.97%, and Italian speakers were 0.85% of the population.

== Economy ==
Clearwater's economy employs nearly 50,400 people. Major employers include Morton Plant Hospital, Tech Data, and Honeywell. Employment in Clearwater grew 1.84% from 2015 to 2016 with 50,345 people in the workforce. The most common job groups include Service, Sales & Office, Science, and Business. As of 2020, the median household income for Clearwater was $50,335, which is below the average for both the United States as well as the state of Florida.

== Art and culture ==
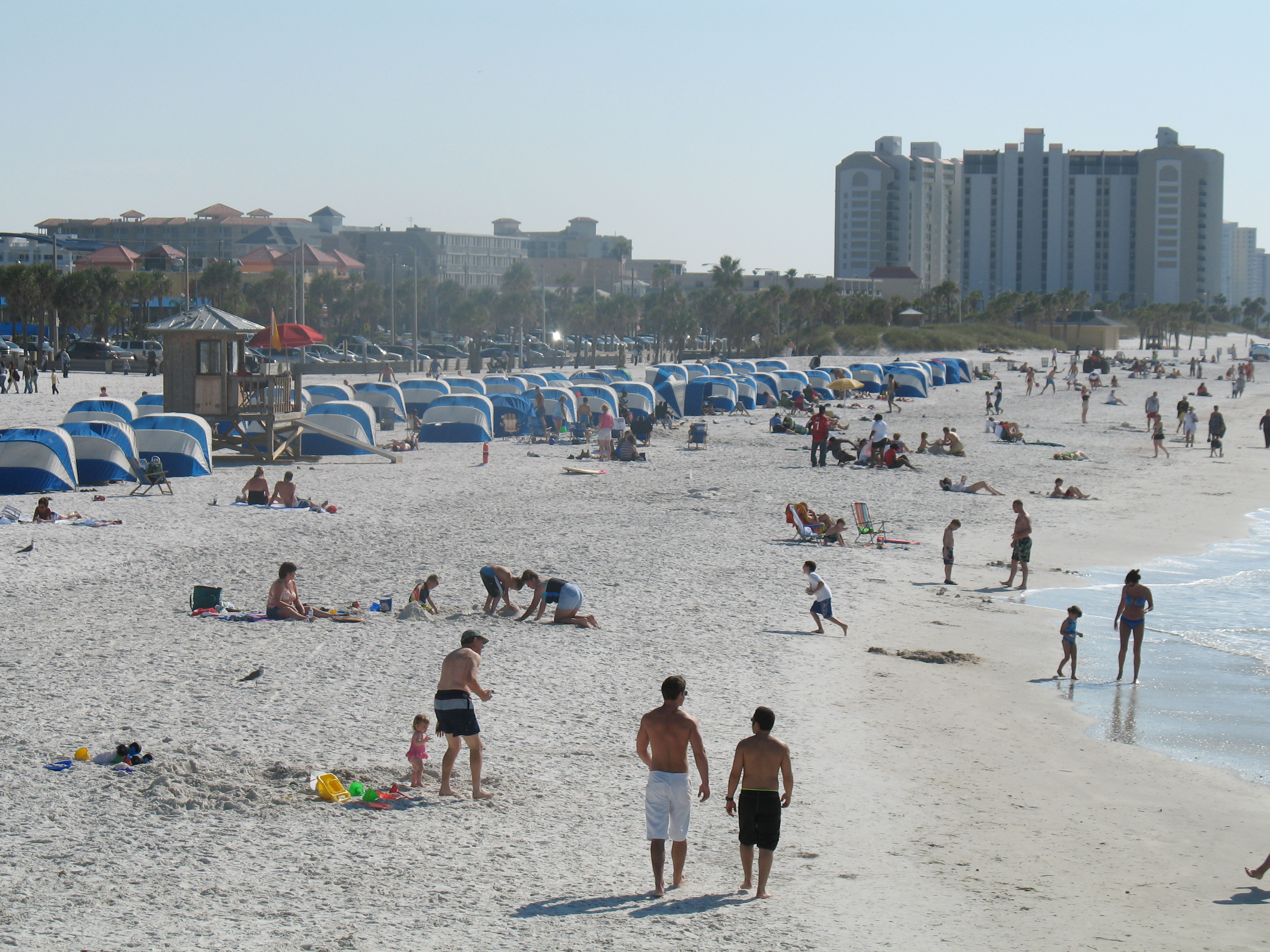
Clearwater Beach, looking south from Pier 60

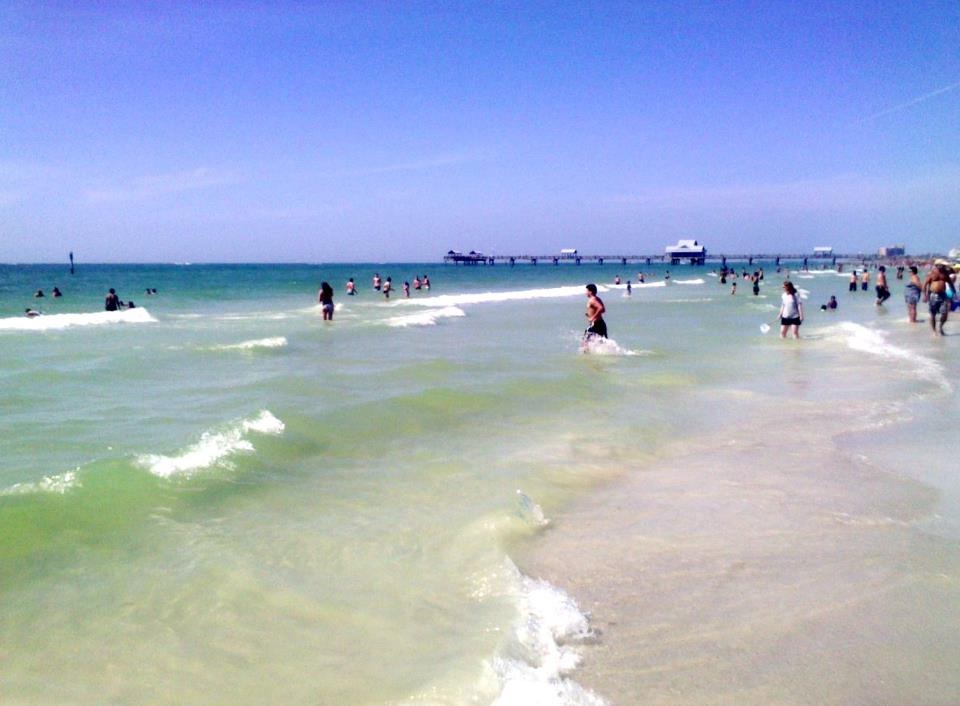
Pier 60 in Clearwater Beach, April 2013

=== Tourism ===
==== Clearwater Public Art and Design Program ====
The Clearwater Public Art and Design Program, adopted by City Council in 2005, is funded through a 1% allocation on all city capital improvement projects valued at more than $500,000. The program commissions an average of 2–3 new projects per year.

==== Capitol and Royalty Theatre ====
Pre-Capitol Theatre, a bandstand stood at 405 Cleveland Street in Downtown Clearwater, where the community gathered to listen to music. The names of locals serving in World War I were etched on the wall of the adjacent Clearwater Sun building; this "Panel of Honor" was obscured when the original Capitol Theatre was built but uncovered when the newspaper building was torn down in 2013.

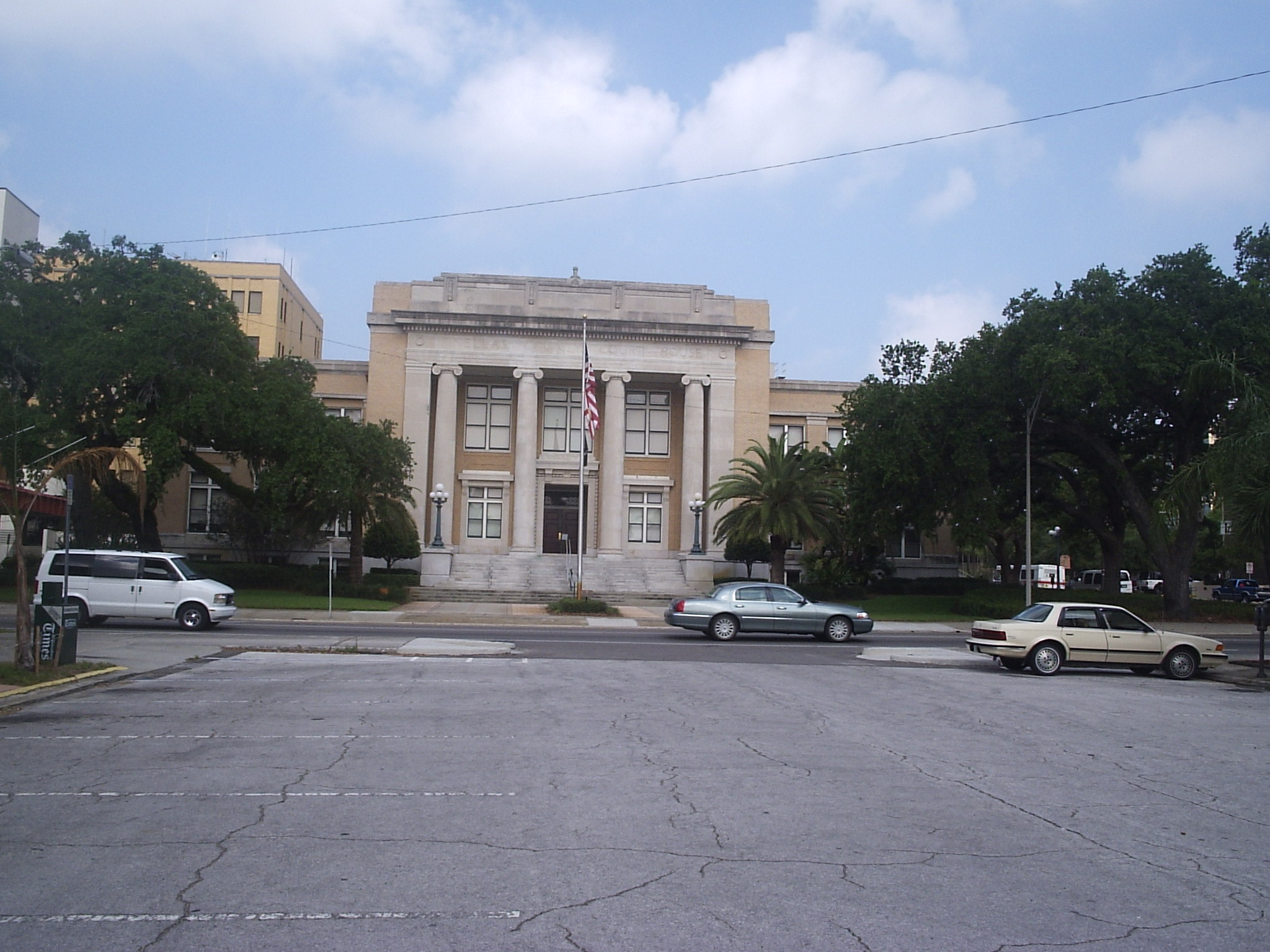
Pinellas County Courthouse in Clearwater

The Capitol Theatre opened March 21, 1921. It was built by Senator-elect John Stansel Taylor. The theater's architect was Lester Avery and the contractor was John D. Phillipoff. Avery is known for his architecture in Miami. Philipoff also built the Coachman Building (1916), the Donald Roebling Estate in Belleair (added to the National Register of Historic Places in 1979), the old Pinellas County Courthouse (added to the National Register of Historic Places in 1992), other historical homes which have been saved, and did work at the Belleview Hotel.

Groundbreaking was December 6, 1920. The "New Capitol Theatre" was damaged in a storm on October 26, 1921 (so it had been completed). A theatre organ was installed in 1922, to accompany silent films with music. The organ was made and installed by the Robert Morton Organ Company.

Donald Roebling was a frequent patron, having his own double seat installed at the theatre.

The theatre was managed by various movie companies (EJ Sparks, Paramount, ABC-Southeastern Theatres, and Plitt Southern) and played the most recent movies of the day. The theatre also offered vaudeville on Friday nights in the 1930s. Headliners included Sally Rand, Fred Stone and his daughter, and Lum and Abner (of radio). The theatre was renovated in 1962. The Morton theatre organ was most likely removed during this renovation. When Plitt Southern did not renew their contract in 1979, Bill Neville and Jerry Strain tried to save the theatre with film classics and reduced prices. However, the theatre closed its doors on October 28, 1980.

Royalty Theater Company signed leases with the Taylor family in February 1981, when it then became known as the Royalty Theater (Clearwater, Florida). The building was renovated with Ron Winter of Winter Associates as the contractor and Scott Musheff as the architect.

During the renovations, Bill Neville's murdered body was found in the balcony.

The theatre remained in the Taylor family estate until it was sold in 1996. In July 2008, the building went into foreclosure.

In January 2009, the City of Clearwater and Ruth Eckerd Hall joined forces to purchase the theatre (renamed Capitol Theatre) as well as the neighboring Pat Lokey building as part of a renovation and revitalization of the historic Capitol Theater. Fowler Associates Architects, Inc. was selected for the renovation of the Capitol Theatre. The $10 million renovation and expansion began in 2012 and was completed in 2013. In 2019, a $2.5 million donation renamed the building the Nancy and David Bilheimer Capitol Theatre.

==== Clearwater Public Library System ====
In 1911, the city of Clearwater witnessed a vast population increase as well as acquiring telephones, electricity, paved streets and an ice factory. It is during this time that the Clearwater Library Association opened a subscription library on the second floor of the local People's Bank. Its popularity and support led to the request of $10,000 from the Carnegie Foundation to build a public library. The building was designed by Tampa architect F.J. Kennard. In its first year, the library had over 1,277 visitors and 2,792 books borrowed. As a vacation town, the library provided free access to materials for all residents and winter visitors.

During the Depression, the Clearwater Public Library faced many of the same threats seen at other libraries seen throughout the United States. This includes increased patron usage and dwindling budget. In the 1940s, the Clearwater library increased its staff from three assistants to five assistants. The library's collection also grew from 18,047 to over 100,000. To account for this increase, the Librarian and Board President Traver Bayly made an appeal to the City Commission for additional space.

As a result of segregation, the Clearwater Public Library was for White patrons only from its founding in 1911 to the mid-twentieth century. In 1950, the City Commission agreed to the building of the North Greenwood library. Designed by Architect Eugene Beach, the new library allowed access for the city's African American population to many information sources. This library was renovated in 1984. The new Main library was rebuilt beginning in 2000. It opened in May 2004.

As the population continued to increase throughout the late twentieth century, the library system continued to grow. The Clearwater Public Library System now includes five libraries: Clearwater Main, Countryside, North Greenwood, Beach, and East. In recent years, the Clearwater Public Library System has become increasingly digital, providing patrons with access to computers, online databases, and an online library catalog. This was made possible by the Greater Clearwater Public Library Foundation, Inc. which formed in 1984. As a part of the library's Centennial Celebration, a project is commencing to add makerspaces to the libraries. The Main library's makerspace is the "Studios at Main" and targets creative arts making.

The Clearwater Public Library System is a contributor to the Pinellas Memory Project. This system of libraries is part of the Pinellas Public Library Cooperative which seeks to provide patrons with access to information and programs to benefit the community.

==== Clearwater Marine Aquarium ====
The Clearwater Marine Aquarium is a small non-profit aquarium. Opening in 1972 on Clearwater Beach, the aquarium is most famous for Winter the dolphin. Rescued as a calf in 2005, Winter was one of the first dolphins to have been fitted with a prosthetic tail after losing it due to entanglement in a crab trap. The aquarium is also home to other dolphins, otters, pelicans, nurse sharks, and turtles among several species of fish and other marine life. CMA also assists in animal strandings and other emergencies regarding sea life. Animals that have stranded are rehabilitated, and if possible, released back into the wild once they have made a full recovery. It has been featured as the main setting of the American family movie series Dolphin Tale.

== Sports ==
BayCare Ballpark in Clearwater is the spring training home of Major League Baseball's Philadelphia Phillies, as well as their Low-A affiliate, the Clearwater Threshers.

== Parks and recreation ==
Moccasin Lake Nature Park is a 51-acre nature preserve (21 ha) with a 5-acre lake (2.0 ha) owned and operated by the city. The preserve also features the Moccasin Lake Environmental Education Center, which offers environmental education classes, programs and camps. The Center features live rehabilitated birds of prey, reptiles, amphibians and aquatic wildlife. It opened in 1982. The City of Clearwater contains five pools: Ross Norton, North Greenwood, Morningside, the Long Center, and Clearwater Beach. Swim lessons are offered throughout the year to patrons, and the pools have both a recreation summer pool league and the Clearwater Aquatics Team. These pools have participated in the World's Largest Swim Lesson.

== Government ==
The City of Clearwater is administered by a council-manager form of government, and the city manager serves as the chief executive and administrative officer of the city.

The Clearwater City Council includes the mayor and four council members, each of whom serves a four-year term. The council is responsible for setting policies and making decisions on local government issues including tax rates, annexations, property code variances and large contract awards. The city manager and city council are supported by the various city departments.

== Education ==
- St. Petersburg College
- Everest University
- Clearwater High School
- Clearwater Central Catholic High School
- Ultimate Medical Academy
- Clearwater Academy International
- Nova Southeastern University

== Transportation ==
=== Airport ===
Tampa International Airport serves Clearwater and the rest of the Tampa Bay Area as the primary means of air travel. St. Petersburg-Clearwater International Airport has also seen its usage increase. The city owns Clearwater Air Park.

=== Public transportation ===
The Pinellas Suncoast Transit Authority (PSTA) bus service is currently Pinellas County's only general public transit. The service offers approximately 35 local routes, two express routes which cross Tampa Bay to the east, and a beach trolley that runs north and south along the county's roughly 25-mile-long (40 km) chain of barrier islands.

The city was formerly served by Amtrak at Clearwater station.

== Notable people ==
- Kirstie Alley (1951–2022), television and film actress
- Austin Aries, professional wrestler
- Jeff Attinella, soccer player
- Sara Blakely, founder of Spanx, Inc.
- Donald Byrd (born 1949), modern dance choreographer
- Ricky Carmichael, supercross/motocross racer
- Carter W. Clarke (1896–1987), U.S. Army General who oversaw the Venona project
- Ken Climo, professional disc golfer
- Chick Corea (1941–2021), jazz pianist
- Tom Cruise, actor and film producer
- Jared Frayer, American freestyle wrestler, competed at 2012 Summer Olympics for Team USA
- Jeremiah George, former American football player
- Joseph W. Hatchett (1932–2021), Florida Supreme Court Justice
- Hulk Hogan (1953–2025), professional wrestler
- Jacy Jayne, Professional Wrestler
- Howard Johnson, 1986 World Series Champion with the New York Mets, Major League Baseball third baseman
- Homer W. Kiefer (1898–1976), US Army major general
- Evel Knievel (1938–2007), stuntman
- Julian McMahon (1968–2025), actor
- Donald Campbell McMullen (1871-1947), member of the Florida House of Representatives and Florida Senate
- Clark Mills (1915-2001), creator of international Optimist dinghy (first sailed in Clearwater)
- Kirstjen Nielsen, former United States Secretary of Homeland Security
- Tilian Pearson, musician, lyricist, and vocalist for post-hardcore band Dance Gavin Dance
- Lisa Marie Presley (1968–2023), former resident
- Gary Puckett, singer
- Jimmy Roselli (1925–2011), singer-pianist, WWII veteran
- Melanie Safka (1947–2024), singer-songwriter
- Juliet Simms, musician, Scientologist, contestant on The Voice, resident from 1994 to 2006
- Lazar Stefanovic (born 2006), soccer player
- Lynn D. Stewart, co-founder of the Hooters restaurant chain
- Elsie Thompson (1899–2013), supercentenarian
- Keith Thurman, professional boxer

== Church of Scientology ==
The Church of Scientology's "spiritual headquarters" are located in downtown Clearwater. The Church refers to Clearwater as its "Flag Land Base".

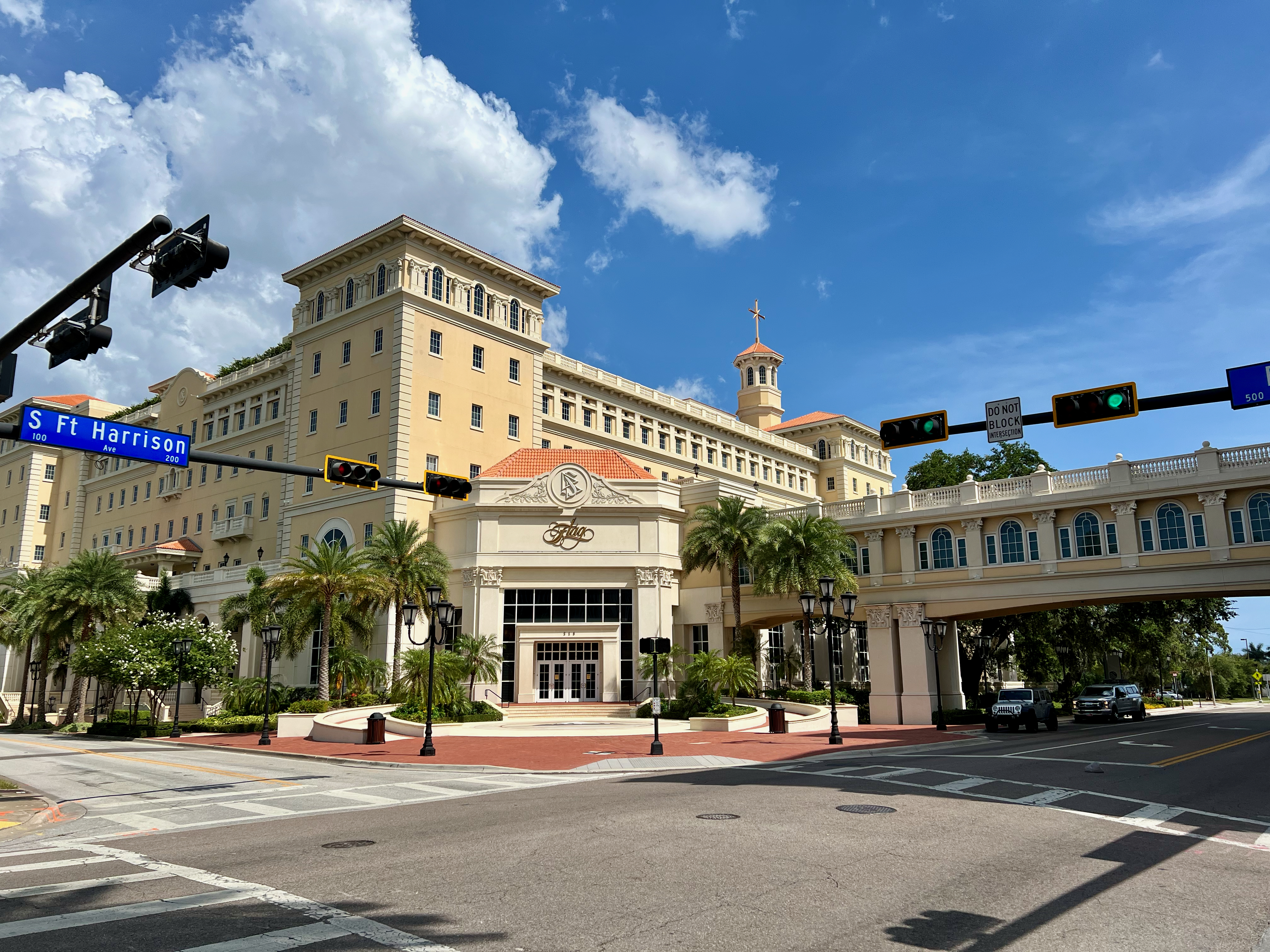
The Church of Scientology's Clearwater headquarters, the Super Power Building

The Church of Scientology owns several historical landmark buildings including the Fort Harrison Hotel and the Clearwater Bank Building. As of 2019, Scientology had purchased so much property in downtown Clearwater that it owned most of the commercial buildings in the downtown core, many of which remained vacant. According to an investigation by the Tampa Bay Times, "The [Church of Scientology], its members and companies they control now own 185 properties that cover 101 acres in the center of downtown. Half the properties were bought since January 2017. ...Seventy-three percent of the property is [now] tax-exempt for religious purposes." By 2024, the count was up to 210 parcels purchased since 2017, including the office tower where city government offices were located, and leaving only seven remaining commercial property owners who are not associated with Scientology or government.

Beginning in the 1970s under the code-name Project Normandy, the Church of Scientology began targeting Clearwater in order to "establish area control" of the city and county. The operations were exposed in a Pulitzer Prize winning series of articles in the Clearwater Sun. Gabe Cazares, who was the mayor of Clearwater at the time, went so far as to call it "the occupation of Clearwater" and later characterized it as a "paramilitary operation by a terrorist group". The Church of Scientology targeted Cazares, attempting to entrap him in a sex scandal. Scientology also staged a phony hit-and-run accident with Cazares in an attempt to discredit him. Cazares and his wife sued the Church of Scientology for $1.5 million. The church settled with Cazares in 1986.

== Sister cities ==
Clearwater has city partnerships with the following cities:

- Nagano, Japan
- Kalamaria, Greece
- Wyong, New South Wales, Australia
- Ixmiquilpan, Hidalgo, Mexico
