= The Temple House =

Building in Miami Beach, Florida, U.S.

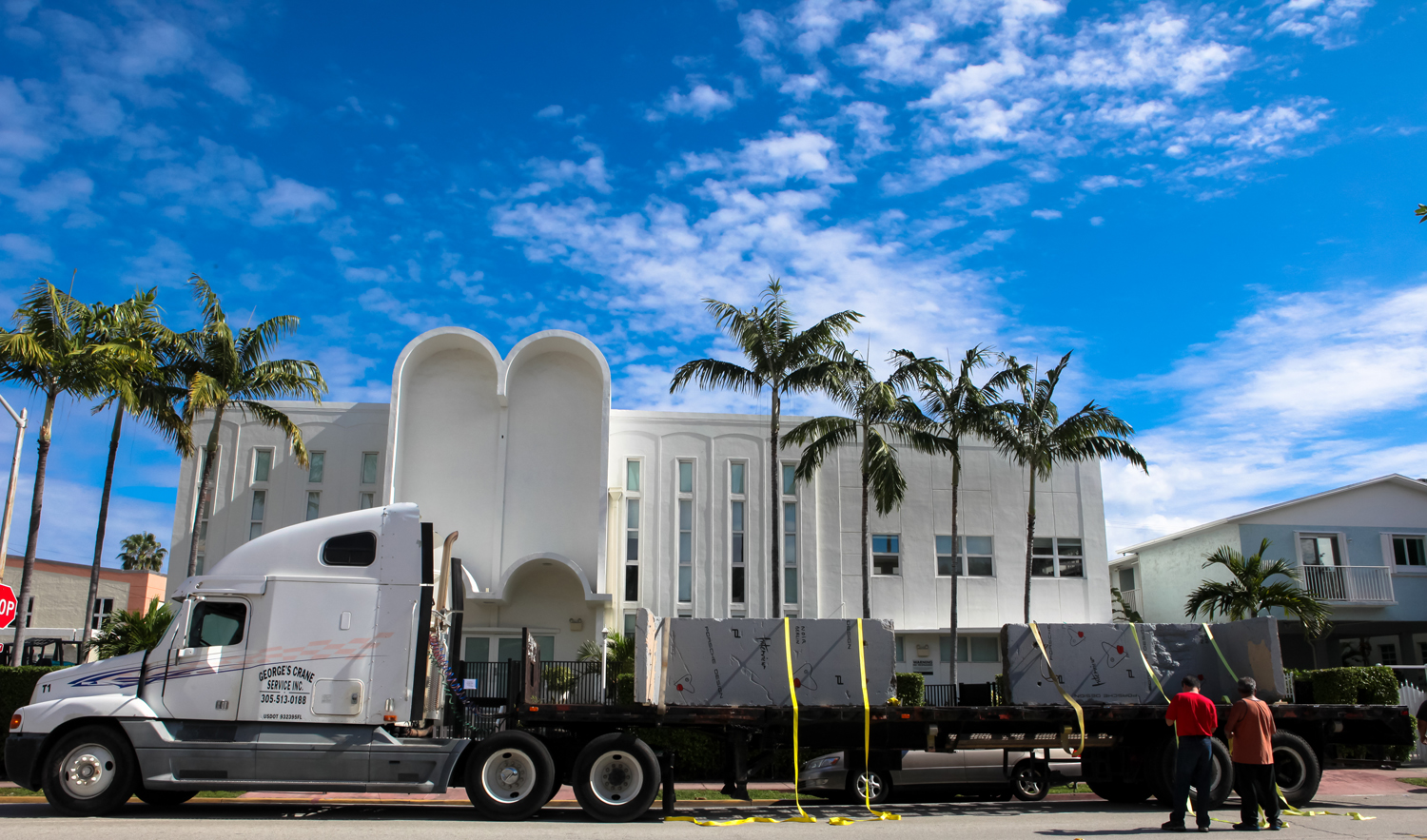

General information
- Location: Miami Beach
- Coordinates: 25.78597°N 80.13492°W
- Completed: 1933

Technical details
- Floor area: 6000 sq ft.

Design and construction
- Architect: L. Murray Dixon

The Temple House is a private event space in the South Beach area of Miami, Florida, United States. Designed by L. Murray Dixon, it was once the largest single family residence in the city. The Temple House is frequently used as a location for music videos, including One Direction's "Best Song Ever" and Lumideea and Pitbull's "Crazy".

== History ==
The Temple House, as it is now called, was originally constructed as a two-story single family residence in 1933, with the first stone laid by its architect, L. Murray Dixon, who also designed a number of other well-known Art Deco buildings in Miami Beach. Dixon's work is known and recognized for its use of circles and banding.

In 1942 The Temple House was expanded and re-zoned for the Joseph-Jacob Congregation, which was subsequently renamed Temple Emanuel and eventually moved to a new location in 1965. At that point, through the efforts of architect Lester Avery, the Temple House expanded its facility to 16,350-foot (4,980 m) to accommodate the 1,000-member Orthodox Jewish group Knesseth Israel.

In March 2003, The Temple House was purchased by Daniel Davidson, who began renovation work shortly thereafter, preserving the architectural features of the building while installing new electrical, plumbing, and air conditioning systems. Davidson used the house for lavish parties with celebrity guests, and it was also the backdrop to music videos, lectures, feature films, TV-shows and private corporate events.

In 2014, the house was put up for sale at $16.925 million.

== Attributes ==
The house has five bedrooms and six bathrooms, and a 6,600-square-foot (610 m^{2}) living room with 23 feet (7.0 m) from floor to ceiling. There is a 1,100-square-foot (100 m^{2}) mezzanine overlooking the living room. There is also a 2,700 square foot loft office room with kitchen and bathroom, and a 1,100 square foot 2nd floor with kitchen and access to a 2,900-square-foot (270 m^{2}) sun deck. An outdoor terrace has a swimming pool with three waterfalls. There is also an acoustic and soundproof media room with surround sound and a 100" projection screen.
