= SLS South Beach Hotel =

SLS South Beach
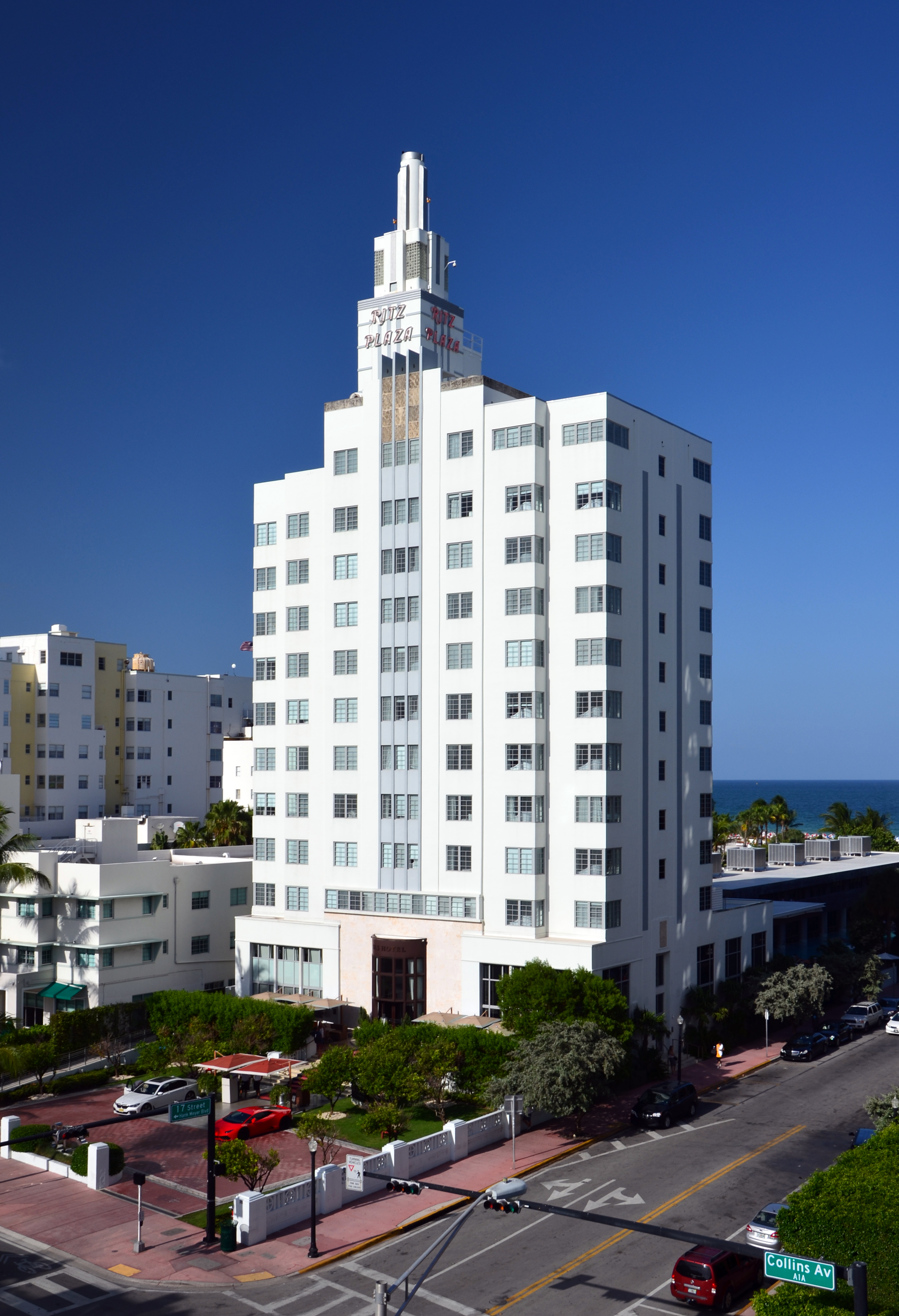
- Interactive map of the SLS South Beach area

General information
- Status: Completed
- Type: Hotel
- Location: 1701 Collins Ave; Miami Beach, Florida, United States
- Coordinates: 25.792076°N 80.129667°W
- Completed: 1939
- Owner: Sam Nazarian

Technical details
- Floor count: 12

Design and construction
- Architect: L. Murray Dixon

The SLS South Beach is a historic hotel, known for many years as the Ritz Plaza Hotel, in the Miami Beach Architectural District in Miami Beach, Florida. The 12 floor, 62 metres (203 feet) hotel was the tallest building in the city for 30 years, until it was surpassed by 5660 Condominiums.

== History ==
The Grossinger family expanded from their Catskill resort into Miami Beach in 1939. The Art Deco tower was designed by architect L. Murray Dixon and opened as the Grossinger Beach Hotel. It was the first air-conditioned hotel on Miami Beach.

The hotel was used by the U.S. Army during World War II to accommodate high-ranking officers. The property re-opened in 1946 as the Ritz Plaza.

In 1989, the hotel was purchased by Ignacio Contreras and Manuel Llerandi and restored to its Art Deco roots, reopening in February 1990. The hotel became a member of the National Trust for Historic Preservation's Historic Hotels of America in 1991. The Ritz Plaza was sold to developer Sam Nazarian in 2004 and closed for reconstruction as a luxury boutique hotel. The work took much longer than anticipated, and the hotel did not reopen until June 2012, as the SLS South Beach.

In June 2015, Guernsey based GoldenPeaks Capital Real Estate bought the building for $125 million. As part of the deal, Nazarian's sbe Hotel Group retained the hotel operations until 2030.

| Preceded by Shore Club Hotel | Tallest Building in Miami Beach; 1940—1970; 62m | Succeeded by 5660 Condominiums |
