= D. C. McMullen =

American politician

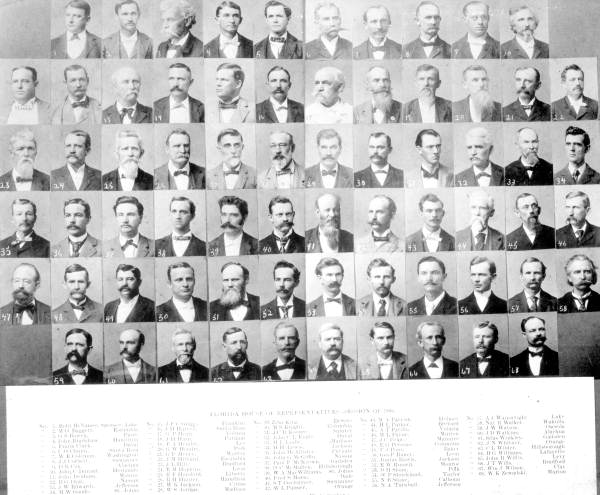
Members of the 1899 House of Representatives - Tallahassee, Florida

Donald Campbell McMullen (October 10, 1871 - September 29, 1947) was a citrus plantation owner and a state legislator. He represented Hillsborough County, Florida, in the Florida House of Representatives in 1899 and then in the Florida Senate in both the 1909 and 1911 sessions.

He was born October 10, 1871, in Clearwater to Daniel and Margaret Ann McMullen and was there sixth son of eighth children. His father was a prominent early resident of the Tampa Bay area in what is now Pinellas County. The family home is preserved as part of Heritage Village.

He attended the Lake City, Florida Agricultural College for three years. He went to Mercer University, Georgia, in the 1890s obtaining his law degree in 1896, before then going on to set up his own law practice in 1899 in Tampa, Florida.

He married Mary Louisa ("Mary Lou") Ball on October 14, 1903, and they set up home in Hyde Park, where they raised two daughters and two sons.

He was the first president of the Largo Bank when it was chartered October 21, 1907.

He also served as the county attorney and then as the State Railroad Commission chief counsel.

He died from a heart attack September 29, 1947, in his home in Tampa, Florida, and he was survived by his four children.
