= Flag Building =

Scientology building in Clearwater, Florida

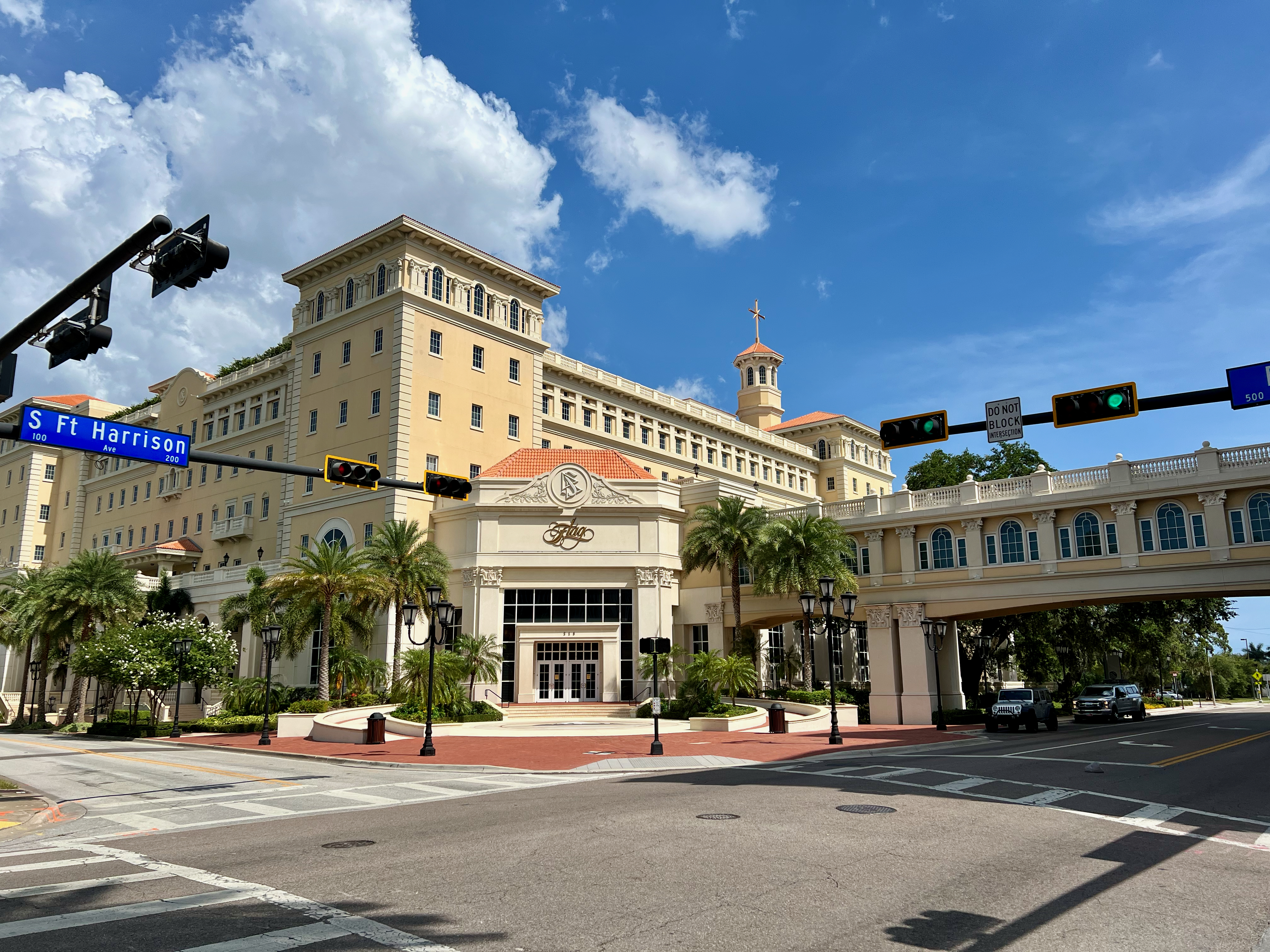
- Former names: Super Power Building

General information
- Architectural style: Mediterranean Revival
- Location: 215 S Fort Harrison Avenue, Clearwater, Florida
- Coordinates: 27.963403°N 82.799124°W
- Groundbreaking: October 6, 1998
- Completed: 2011
- Opened: 2013
- Cost: US$145,000,000
- Owner: Church of Scientology Religious Trust

Technical details
- Floor count: 7
- Floor area: 373,544 SF
- Grounds: 2.12 acres

The Flag Building, formerly known as the Super Power Building, is the largest building in Clearwater, Florida, and is owned by the Church of Scientology. The building was built principally to deliver Scientology's Super Power Rundown, a special program intended to train someone to use all of their 57 "perceptics" (senses). Construction began in 1998 but halted in 2003. The city assessed daily fines to encourage progress and completion of the building, suspecting that the Church was deliberately delaying construction and using the incomplete project as a fundraising cash cow while diverting millions of dollars in donations to numerous other real estate purchases and construction projects around Clearwater. It is estimated that at least $145 million was raised by Church fundraising towards the project. The building finally opened on November 17, 2013.

== Description ==
The building occupies an entire city block at 215 South Fort Harrison Avenue. It includes a 15-story tower topped by a bronze Scientology cross visible from much of Clearwater.

At 127,000 square feet (11,800 m^{2}), the building is the largest property in Clearwater. It was originally budgeted to cost $24 million, but the cost had more than doubled to $40 million by 2009, plus an estimation of an extra $50 million to complete the interior. According to the building plans, the Super Power Building would feature a grand lobby lined with sculptures depicting aspects of Scientology; theaters for training and introductory films; a museum honoring the Sea Org; and a separate museum honoring Scientology's founder, L. Ron Hubbard. The sixth floor would house an indoor running track for Scientologists undergoing the Purification Rundown detoxification program. The Mediterranean Revival-style building would also contain a bookstore, a library, and hundreds of course and study rooms; with a total of 889 rooms, 447 windows, and 42 bathrooms, plus an 1,140-seat dining room and two kitchens.

A 124-foot (38 m) sky bridge connects the Super Power Building to the Scientology-owned Fort Harrison Hotel on the other side of S. Fort Harrison Avenue. In January 2012, Tony Ortega of the Village Voice published leaked blueprints of the Super Power Building that revealed architectural features including a recreation of a deck on the Apollo, L. Ron Hubbard's flagship in the 1960s.

In 2024, the Pinellas County Property Appraiser estimated the market value of the building at $156 million, but has assessed no property taxes on it since its completion in 2011.

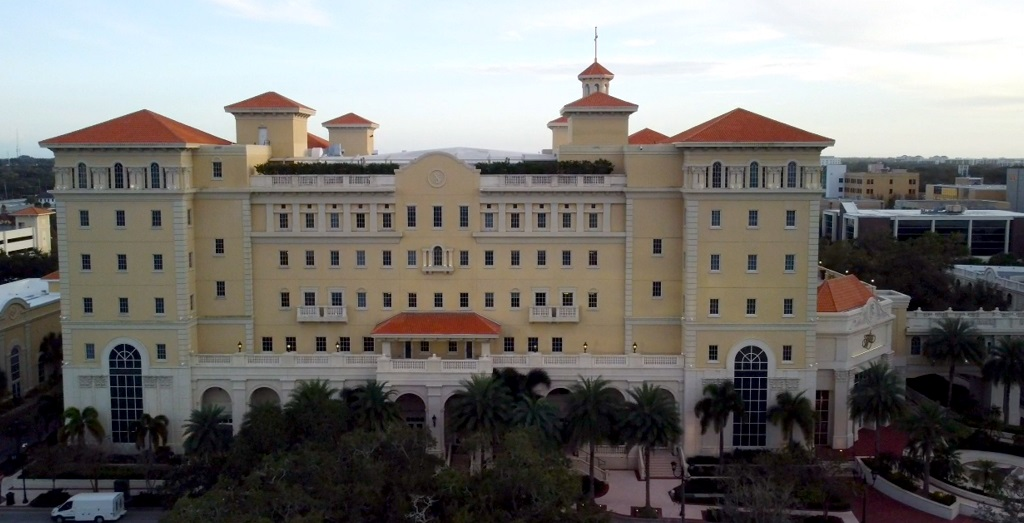
Flag Building (north side)

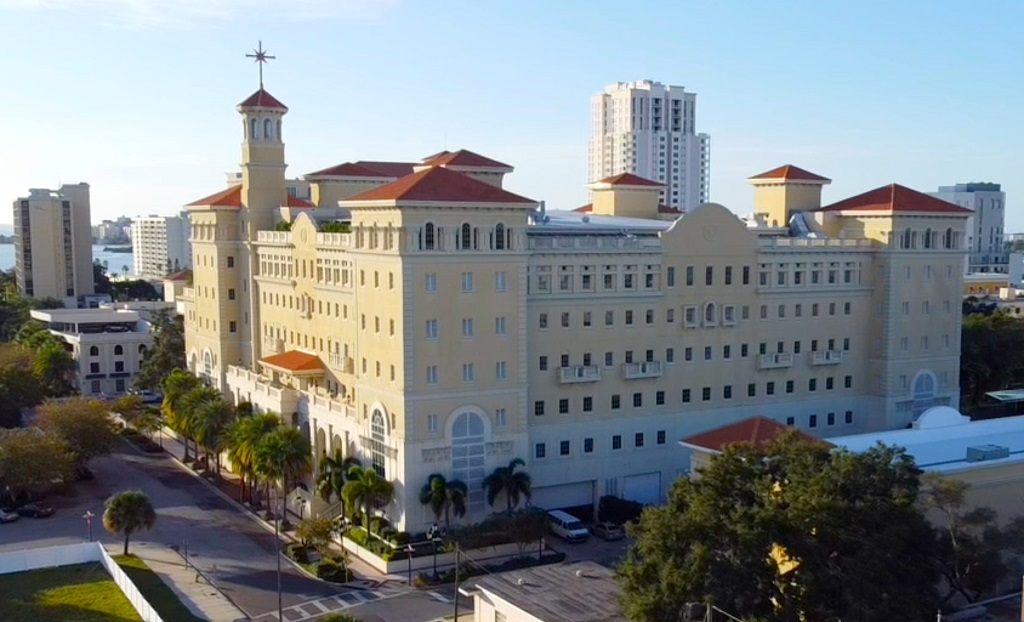
Flag building (south and east side)

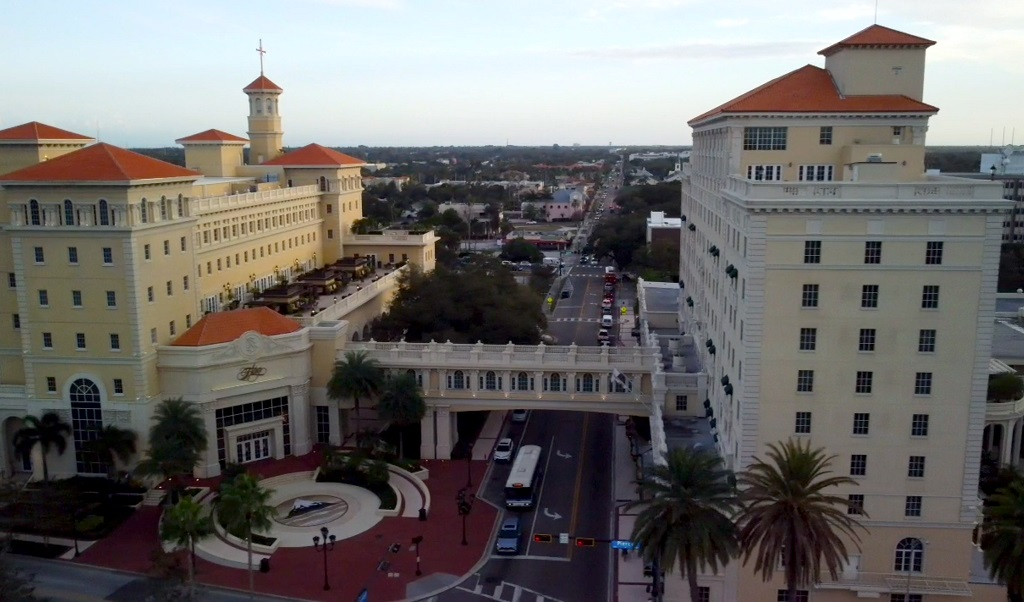
Flag Building (left) connects with the Fort Harrison Hotel (right) via sky bridge over Ft. Harrison Avenue

== Fundraising ==
The building was financed through a fundraising effort called the "Super Power Expansion Project." A fundraising letter sent to Scientologists in March 2002 described the purpose of the project:

With the world in such a state of degradation and dismay, the only hope to reverse the dwindling spiral on Earth is to speed the release of Super Power.

As you know, the 12 Rundowns of Super Power were designed to handle the barriers to this planet's Clearing. By releasing this technology, we will unleash the Super Power of every being who completes these rundowns and they will built [sic] the New Civilization so vitally needed.

The rapid completion of the funding and construction of the new building, guarantees this Cleared Earth.

Contributions to the project were on a sliding scale with "titles" fancied among adherents as prizes according to the level of donations. These ranged from the starting level, "Flag Supporter" (a $1,000 donation), to the mid-ranking "Master Builder of Merit" ($500,000) and so on up to the "Legion of OT Meritorious" ($7,500,000). According to a Scientology magazine published in September 2007, Scientologist actress Kirstie Alley was ranked as a "Founding Member" of the project, indicating a $250,000 donation. The actress Catherine Bell had also contributed and was ranked as a "Double Cornerstone Member" (twice the normal "cornerstone" donation of $35,000 - i.e., $70,000). The project's July 2004 "Cornerstone Newsletter", listed 1,218 members contributing a total of just under $89 million; by 2007, the total had risen to over $142 million. Some individual Scientologists had given up to $5 million each. Scientologists contributing to the project were given a number of benefits depending on the level of their contributions, including "gold validation pins" and "Super Power rings", "exclusive membership to the Key Contributor Lounge in the new mecca building created specially for these stellar contributors", and fee reductions or priority status for Super Power courses. "Cornerstone Members" were promised a 40 percent discount and that their names would be engraved on a plaque inside the building.

A 2011 investigation by the St. Petersburg Times newspaper found that the Church of Scientology had raised at least $145 million from its members for the Super Power Building project, vastly more than the building's ostensible cost. In one week alone, $23 million was raised – almost half the entire cost that had been stated in 2009. Ex-members have complained of being subjected to intensive demands for funds and have suggested that the Church purposefully delayed completing the project so that it would remain a "cash cow", though church spokesmen have strongly denied this. In January 2013, a Californian couple who had donated more than $420,000 to the project sued the Church of Scientology for fraud and deception, charging that the Church had kept the building incomplete "to use it as a shill to induce further payments from members, just as they did the plaintiffs".

== Construction delays and fines ==
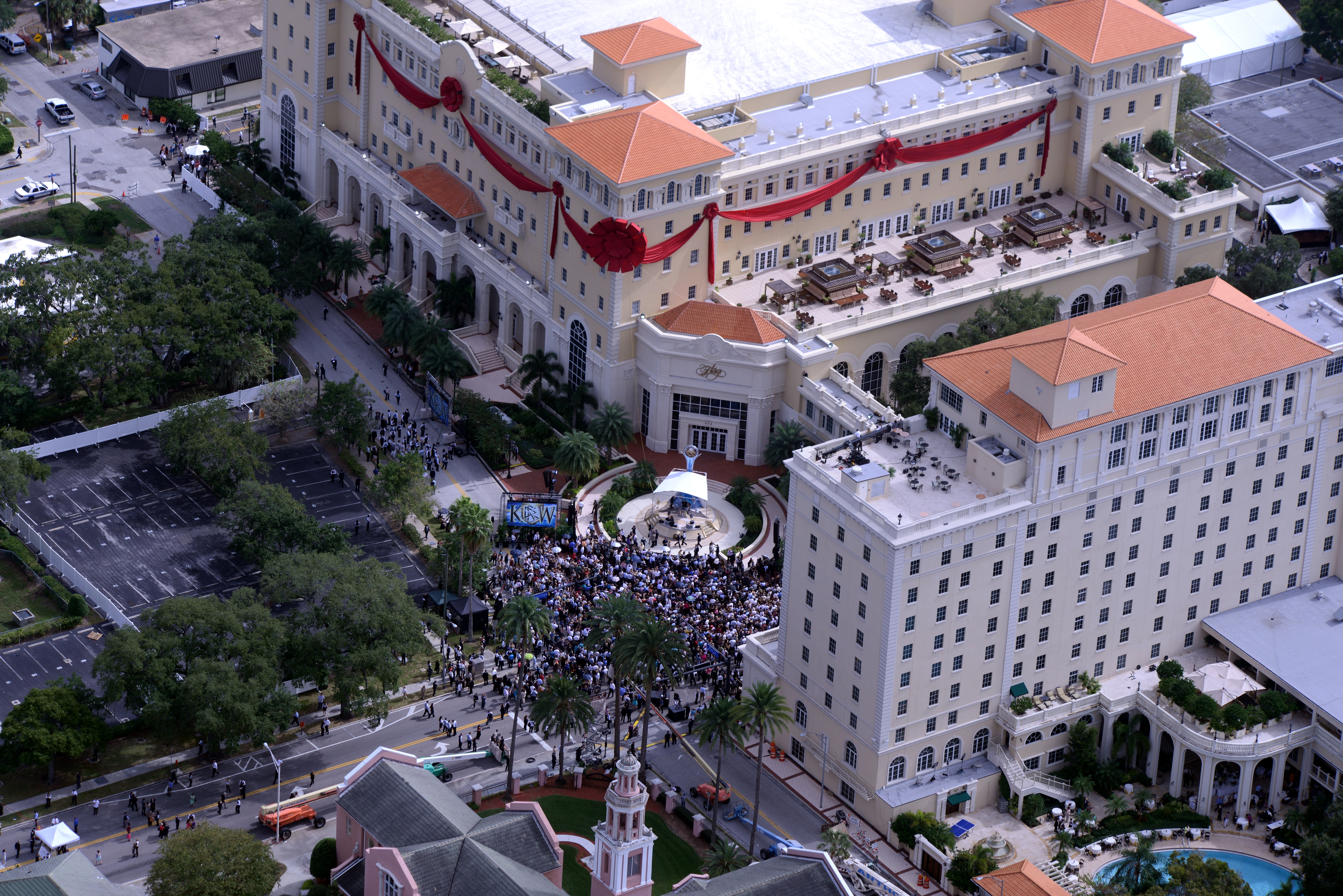
Opening of the Super Power Building on November 17, 2013

Plans for the Super Power Building project were unveiled in 1993 by the Los Angeles-based Church of Scientology Religious Trust. The site was formerly occupied by the Gray Moss Inn, a turn-of-the-century building across the street from the Scientology-owned Fort Harrison Hotel. The inn had stood empty since being damaged in a 1989 arson fire and the Church of Scientology acquired the land in 1991 after it had been purchased by local property developer Terence J. McCarthy, the owner of T.J.M. Holding and president of Graymoss, Inc.

The architectural firm HOK was hired to deliver the project. Construction officially began by Skanska USA in November 1998 and was slated for completion by late 2003. However, work fell well behind schedule and stopped in 2003. The cost of construction was reported to have more than doubled due to rises in the price of steel and labor, with the Church repeatedly issuing fundraising requests to its members. The revised cost was not disclosed but in 2000 it was reported that the cost had risen from the initial estimate of $24 million to $45 million, and a doubling of this figure would put the total cost at over $90 million. The Church also stated that the building had undergone two major redesigns due to its requirement to "keep pace with the quality of construction at other new facilities". In mid-February 2006, the Church hired Gensler, the world's largest architectural firm, to take over the project.

The erratic progress of the project prompted criticism from local government officials and residents. In 2005, the city's code enforcement board ordered the exterior, including landscaping and sidewalks, to be completed by early summer. Frank Hibbard, the Mayor of Clearwater, noted that "the building had become an eyesore, surrounded by dirt and a chain-link fence." The deadline was not met and daily fines of $250 — totalling over $40,000 by the end of 2006 — were assessed against the Church.

A Church spokesman announced in April 2006 that the building would be completed by the end of 2007, but that date slipped. Press reports at the time indicated that the Church was aiming to complete the building by March 2008. In November 2006 the city of Clearwater served the Church with a development order to complete the exterior of the building. but by December 2006 construction had not yet resumed and Church officials indicated that "mid 2008" was now the target date. The prolonged delay has adversely impacted other proposed developments that intended to capitalize on the promised increased economic activity from Scientologists visiting Clearwater. Church officials have offered no public explanation of the delays other than "a recurring need to revise interior design schemes in an effort to get it just right." Work on the building was still at a standstill by March 2009; the daily fines assessed by the city then totaled $245,000. Construction work was restarted in July 2009 after the completion of renovation of the nearby Fort Harrison Hotel. Scientology officials stated that the building had cost about $40 million up to that point and that completing the interior was expected to add an addition $50 million. No new completion dates were announced, but "as soon as we get the go-ahead from the city, we'll begin".

In September 2009, Church spokesperson Peter Mansell estimated the Super Power Building would be ready for occupancy by fall of 2010. That date passed without the building opening, though the exterior was completed by 2011. In June 2011, the St. Petersburg Times reported that the building had passed inspection and its Certificate of Occupancy had been obtained. The Church sought to seek a reduction in the fine assessed by the city at the Code Enforcement Board's July or August meeting. Church spokeswoman Pat Harney said, "We are simply following the standard procedures to close out any remaining permit issues." According to city assistant planning director Gina Clayton, since 2000 the Church has paid the city, county and state $2.2 million in permit, plan review, impact and other fees. The Church said its redesigns needed time. "We build for eternity", former spokesman Ben Shaw told the Times. "When we do that, we want it perfect." The Church said it would host a ribbon-cutting and dedication ceremony there later in 2011. It asked the city to reduce its fine by 90 percent, to reflect its "good faith" effort in bringing the building to code, but the city's resident-led Code Enforcement Board, which has a record of leniency and decimating fines, voted unanimously to keep the fines mostly untouched, saying the Church had long ignored the city's rules. The fine was set at $413,500, allowing for a reduction to account for months when the Church's plans were paused by city review.

Over 14 years after construction began and nearly a decade after it had been supposed to open, the Super Power Building had still not been opened. It has been valued at $80 million by county assessors. In August 2013 the Church disclosed that it was planning to open the building on October 6, 2013, with a dedication ceremony expected to draw in an estimated 10,000 Scientologists in attendance. Only a month later, however, the Church told city authorities that it had decided to cancel the ceremony and postpone the opening of the building to an unspecified date, for undisclosed reasons. The building was finally opened on November 17, 2013, with Scientologist stars such as Tom Cruise, John Travolta and Kelly Preston in attendance for a ceremony presided over by Scientology leader David Miscavige. The number of Scientologists attending the ceremony was reported by the local media to have been far lower than the Church had forecast, perhaps less than 6,000 people, though the Church asserted in a press release that it had been "slightly over the expected 10,000 people".

== Super Power Rundown ==
The Church stated the Super Power Building would provide a dedicated center for delivering the Super Power Rundown, a special Scientology training course that had not then been released. The Super Power Rundown was described by Scientology's founder, L. Ron Hubbard, as

A super fantastic, but confidential series of rundowns that can be done on anybody whether [Dianetics] Clear or not that puts the person into fantastic shape unleashing Super Power of a thetan. This means that puts Scientologists into a new realm of ability enabling them to create a new world. It puts world Clearing within reach of the future. This is a parallel rundown to Power in Saint Hill which is taken by the Dn Clear. It consists of 12 separate high power rundowns which are brand new and enter realms of the tech never before approached. Power is still very much in use on the Grade Chart but is for those who didn't go Clear on Dn.

Hubbard wrote that "Super Power is the answer to a sick, a dying and dead society. With it, we literally revive the dead." A Church of Scientology statement said that "Super Power is a series of spiritual counseling processes designed to give a person back his own viewpoint, increase his perception, exercise his power of choice, and greatly enhance other spiritual abilities." In 2006, the St. Petersburg Times reported that Scientologist Matt Feshbach, a multimillion-dollar donor who was one of the few who had done Super Power, felt that he now "senses danger faster than most people ... appreciates beauty more deeply than he used to ... [and] outperforms his peers in the money management industry". Feshbach said he had become "a more competent spiritual being... not dependent on [his] physical body to perceive things".

=== Perceptics ===
The Church of Scientology's in-house magazine Source has promoted the program as being aimed "to shift the creation of a new civilization into overdrive". According to Source, "this is the powerful series of rundowns that will move every Scientologist, at any level of The Bridge, into an entirely new realm of ability. It's here one will progress through the drilling stations of the Perceptic Rundown. And when it comes to the future, here's the likes of which has never even been conceived of on this planet." The 57 "perceptics" (senses) addressed by the rundown are:

Time, Sight; Taste, Color, Depth; Solidity (barriers); Relative sizes (external); Sound; Pitch; Tone; Volume; Rhythm; Smell; Touch (pressure, friction, heat or cold and oiliness); Personal emotion; Endocrine states; Awareness of awareness; Personal size; Organic sensation (including hunger); Heartbeat; Blood circulation; Cellular and bacterial position; Gravitic (self and other weights); Motion of self; Motion (exterior); Body position; Joint position; Internal temperature; External temperature; Balance; Muscular tension; Saline content of self (body); Fields/magnetic; Time track motion; Physical energy (personal weariness, etc.); Self-determinism; Moisture (self); Sound direction; Emotional state of other organs; Personal position on the tone scale; Affinity (self and others); Communication (self and others); Reality (self and others); Emotional state of groups; Compass direction; Level of consciousness; Pain; Perception of conclusions (past and present); Perception of computation (past and present); Perception of imagination (past and present); Perception of having perceived (past and present); Awareness of not knowing; Awareness of importance, unimportance; Awareness of others; Awareness of location and placement (masses, spaces and location itself); Perception of appetite; Kinesthesia.

Artist's rendering of training equipment to be used for delivering Super Power rundowns.

According to the Church of Scientology, the Flag Building would contain specially developed equipment which would "expand on technology developed by NASA to train astronauts" designed to exercise and enhance an individual's "perceptics". The machines would include such things as an antigravity simulator, a gyroscope-like apparatus that spins a person around while blindfolded to improve perception of compass direction, and a video screen that moves forward and backward while flashing images to hone a viewer's ability to identify subliminal messages. According to Marc Headley, who worked on developing the "perceptics", Scientologists would have to undergo testing on each of them. For smell, for example, there are "hundreds and hundreds of vials of distinct smells that did not evaporate. You name it, bananas, peppermint, sunflowers, any smell that you can think of, they had it in a vial. Some of the smells were very similar, like oranges, tangerines, orange peel, orange juice, you had to tell the difference and until you could name each and every one correctly, you did not finish this perceptic."

Leaked blueprints of the building's interior showed facilities such as a "time machine", an "oiliness table", a "pain station" and an "infinite pit". Scientologists undergoing Super Power training in the building would be "spun on a gyroscope-like wheel, spend time in a sound chamber, sniff vials emitting fragrances and experience changes in gravitational pull." According to Headley, the "insanely loud" anti-gravity simulator was nicknamed the "Barfitron".
