= Lawrence Murray Dixon =

American architect

Lawrence Murray Dixon (February 16, 1901 – October 8, 1949) was an architect in Miami Beach, Florida. He was born in Live Oak, Florida, attended the Georgia School of Technology (1918–1919) and worked in New York for Schultze and Weaver from 1923 to 1929 when he moved to Miami Beach. He is credited with designing The Temple House (1933) in the South Beach section of Miami Beach as well as other Art Deco hotels and residences. Dixon is listed as a Great Floridian.

Dixon work includes The Tides Hotel (1936), The Victor Hotel (Miami) (1937), The Tiffany (1939), The Marlin (1939), Tudor Hotel (1939), The Senator (hotel) (1939), The Raleigh Hotel (1940), the Ritz Plaza Hotel (1940), Regent Hotel (1941), and The Betsy Ross (1942). His work is known for its curvilinear design.

The show American Experience called Dixon and Henry Hohauser the principal architects of Deco South Beach, including "streamlined curves, jutting towers, window "eyebrows," and neon." Such buildings were less expensive and less ornamented than those by Carl Fisher, such as the Flamingo and "seemed perfectly suited to a city created for sun, sand, and relaxation."

Dixon died in New York City on October 8, 1949.

== The Temple House ==
The Temple House was first constructed as a two-story single family home in with the first stone laid by Dixon. In 1942 it was expanded and re-zoned for The Joseph-Jacob Congregation, subsequently renamed Temple Emanuel, and moved in 1965. It was expanded by architect Lester Avery to 16,350-foot (4,980 m) for the 1,000 member Orthodox congregation. In 2003 it was purchased by Daniel Davidson.

== L. Murray Dixon offices ==
Located at 1628 Euclid Ave, Miami Beach, FL 33139 in the Flamingo Park neighborhood. Now abuts the Amazon 4 Star Store on Lincoln Road

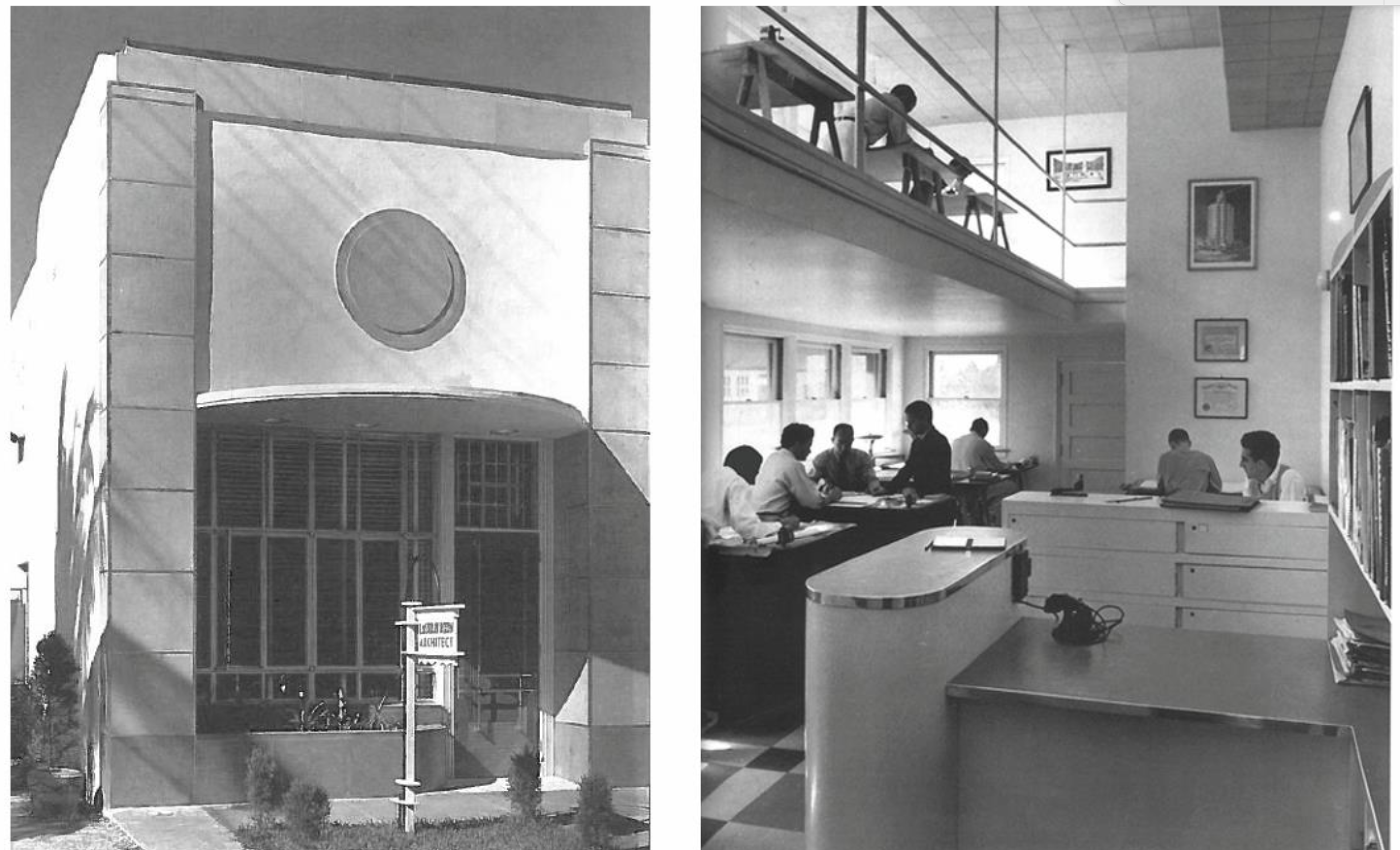
L Murray Dixon offices at 1628 Euclid Ave, Miami Beach 33139

== Work ==
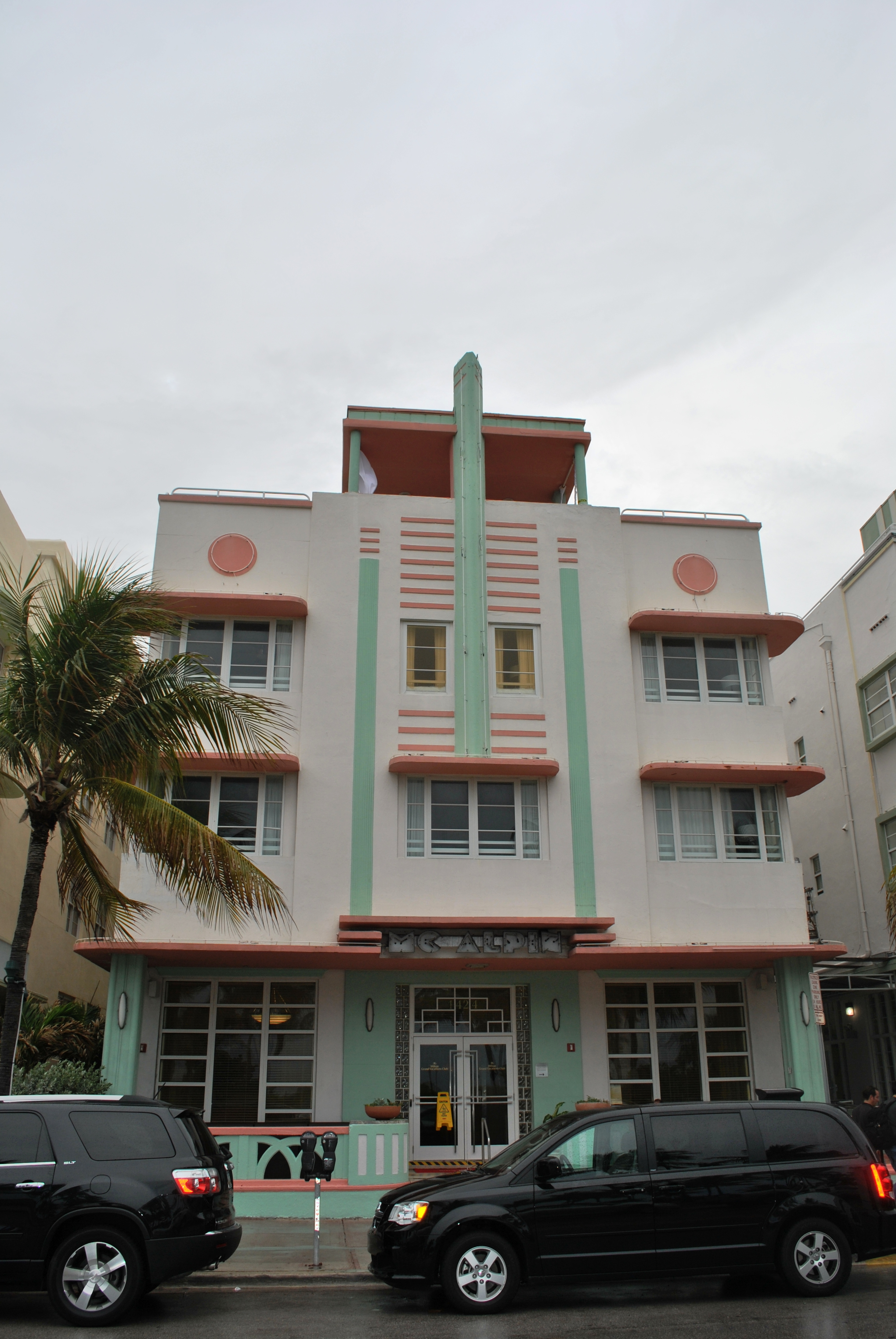
McAlpin Hotel (L. Murray Dixon, 1940)

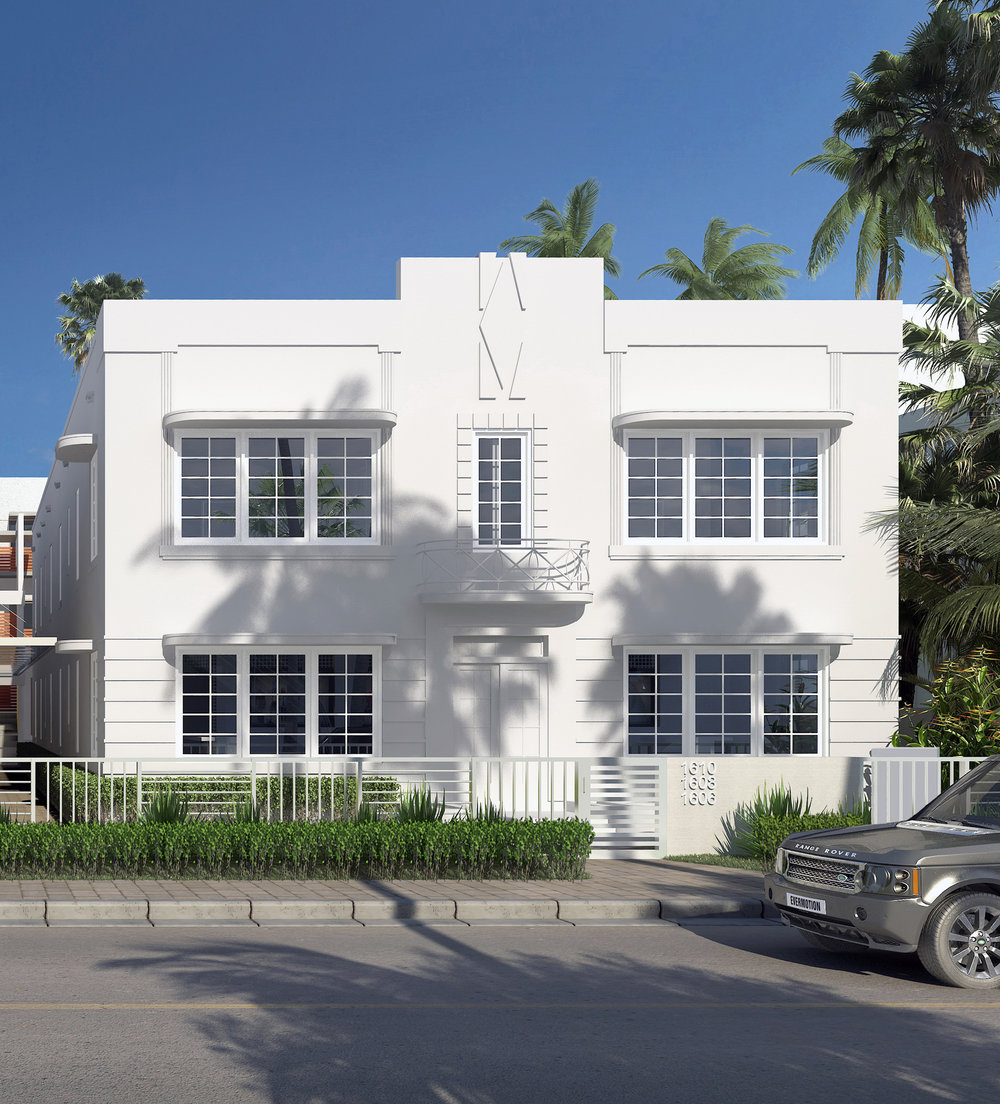
1610 Euclid Ave

- The Ritz Hotel, formerly Grossinger Beach Hotel, (1940), a 12-story art deco hotel topped by a cylinder tower at 1701 Collins Avenue
- Arjay Court Apartments (1937) at 820 Collins Avenue now called POSH hostel by South Beach Group Hotels
- Fillard Apartments (1947) at 2000 Liberty Avenue currently named Riviera Suites Hotel
- The Tudor Hotel, a corner hotel with prominent signage at 1111 Collins (1939) 1111 Collins Avenue
- Fairview (Miami Beach) at 1000 Collins Avenue
- Kent (building) (1939) at 1131 Collins Avenue
- Tides (building) (1936) at 1200 Ocean Drive
- Beach Plaza (Miami Beach)(1936) at 1401 Collins Avenue
- Palmer House (Miami Beach) (1939) at 1119 Collins Avenue
- Marlin (building) (1939) at 1200 Collins Avenue. Includes a ziggurat-style stepped parapet that rises above the symmetrical banded wings with rounded corners. It is topped by a central tower with a flagpole.
- The Tiffany
- The Victor (1937), restored as part of the Hyatt Hotel chain
- The Atlantis, demolished
- The Senator, demolished
- Harriet Court Condo (1935)
- The McAlpin
- The Henderson apartments
- 1610 Euclid Ave, part of the Canterbury condominiums
