= Fort Harrison, Florida =

Former United States military post

Coordinates: 27°57′26″N 82°48′15″W

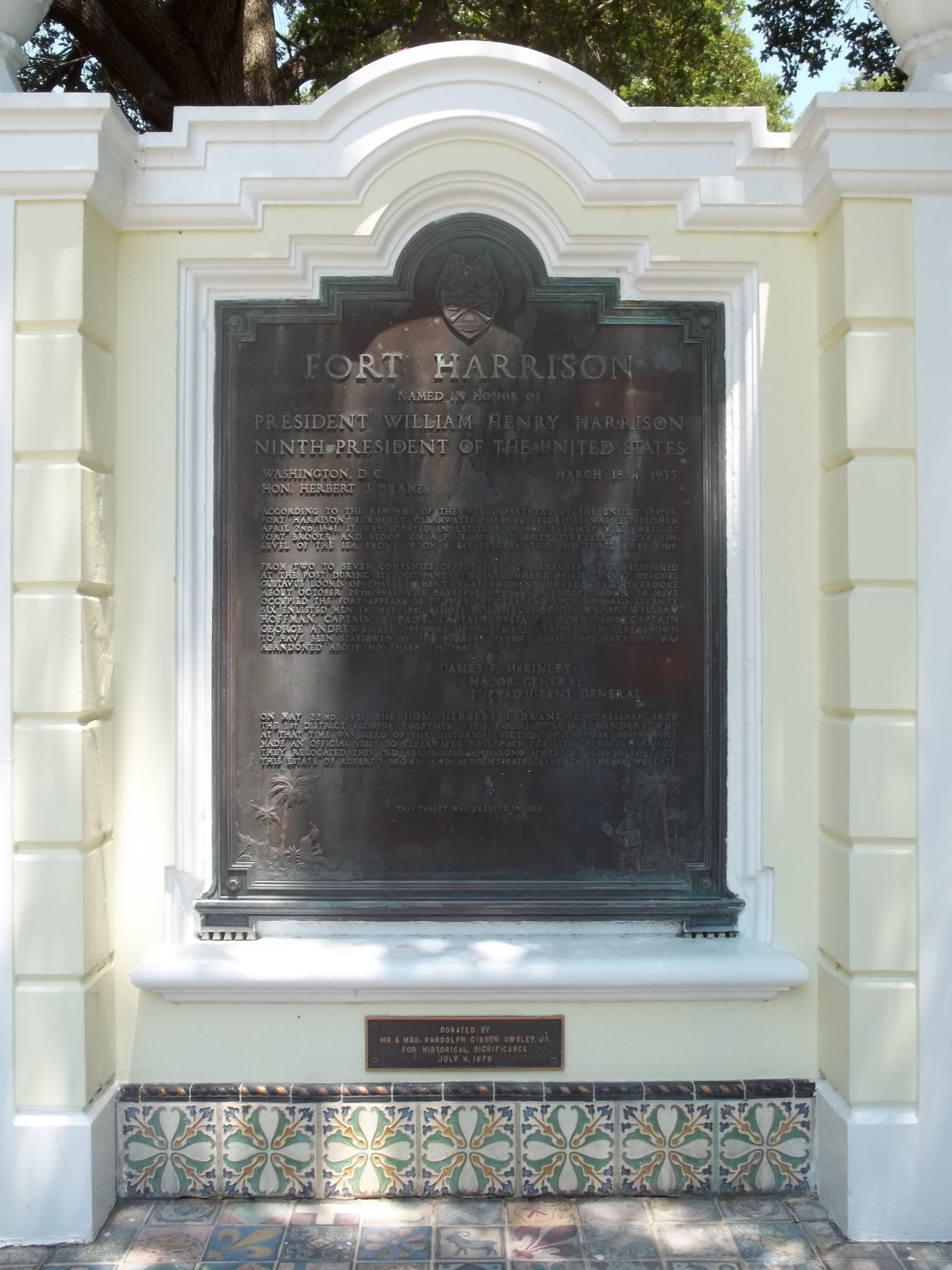
Fort Harrison plaque

Fort Harrison was a United States military post that existed along the west coast of Florida during the Second Seminole War, on a site which now lies within the city of Clearwater. It was named after William Henry Harrison, the then newly inaugurated President of the United States.

The fort was established on April 2, 1841, atop a pine bluff overlooking Clearwater Harbor, where the Harbor Oaks Residential District is today. An auxiliary encampment, Camp William Henry Harrison, was also created on Clearwater Beach. The fort was designed as a convalescent post to treat sick and injured soldiers from other nearby forts, most notably Fort Brooke. Diseases that were treated include neuralgia, chronic diarrhea, dysentery and remittent fever, among others.

There were between two and seven companies of the 6th U.S. Infantry Regiment garrisoned at the fort under the command of Lieutenant Colonel Gustavus Loomis. An average of around 340 soldiers were stationed at the fort over the course of its occupation. The peak occupancy of the fort came to be around 500 to 550 troops, occurring through the months of May and July 1841.

Although the main function of the fort was to allow soldiers to recover their health, in some cases the garrison was used to patrol the area north of Tampa Bay. In June 1841, Colonel William J. Worth (the commander of the U.S. military forces in Florida at the time) assembled troops from this fort, as well as from Fort Brooke and Fort King, for the purpose of capturing the Seminole in the area between the Homosassa and Crystal Rivers and in the vicinity of Tsala Apopka Lake.

A large log building was used to house the soldiers, while the officer's quarters were situated in a separate building. The buildings may have eventually been destroyed by hurricane-force winds. The fort's command moved to Fort Brooke around October 20, 1841, and the fort was fully abandoned around November 1, 1841.

The fort was an important part of the early settlement of Clearwater and the surrounding area. Odet Philippe (the first permanent, non-native settler in Pinellas County) owned a sutler's store during the time of the fort's occupation by the military, and so he was most likely doing business with the fort. After the war, in accordance with the Armed Occupation Act, James Stevens was granted 160 acres of land on and around the abandoned fort. Other families later settled on the land surrounding Stevens' land, and a community soon formed which would ultimately become the city of Clearwater.

Today the only physical marker of the existence and whereabouts of the old fort is a plaque, which was erected in 1935. The plaque is located outside the historic Century Oaks estate, on the corner of Druid Road South and Druid Road West. The Fort Harrison Hotel and Fort Harrison Avenue in Clearwater are presumed to be named after the fort.
