= Fort Harrison Hotel =

Church of Scientology building in Clearwater, Florida

Coordinates: 27.9635°N 82.8004°W

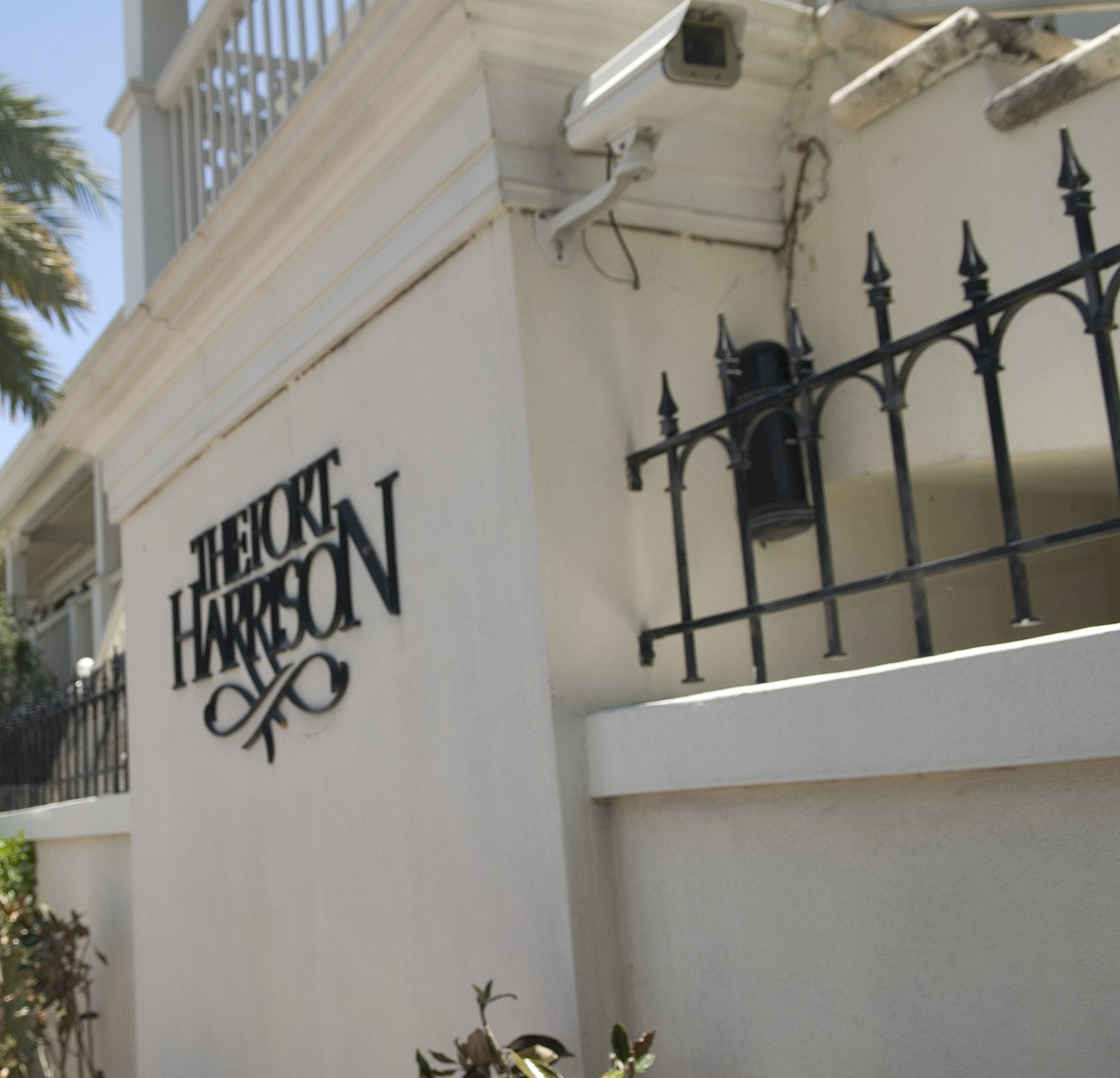
- Fort Harrison Hotel (June 2008)
- Interactive map of the Fort Harrison Hotel area

General information
- Type: Hotel
- Architectural style: Mediterranean Revival
- Location: 210 S Fort Harrison Avenue, Clearwater, Florida
- Completed: 1926
- Owner: Church of Scientology Flag Service Organization, Inc.

Technical details
- Floor count: 11
- Floor area: 220,000 SF
- Grounds: 2.32 acres

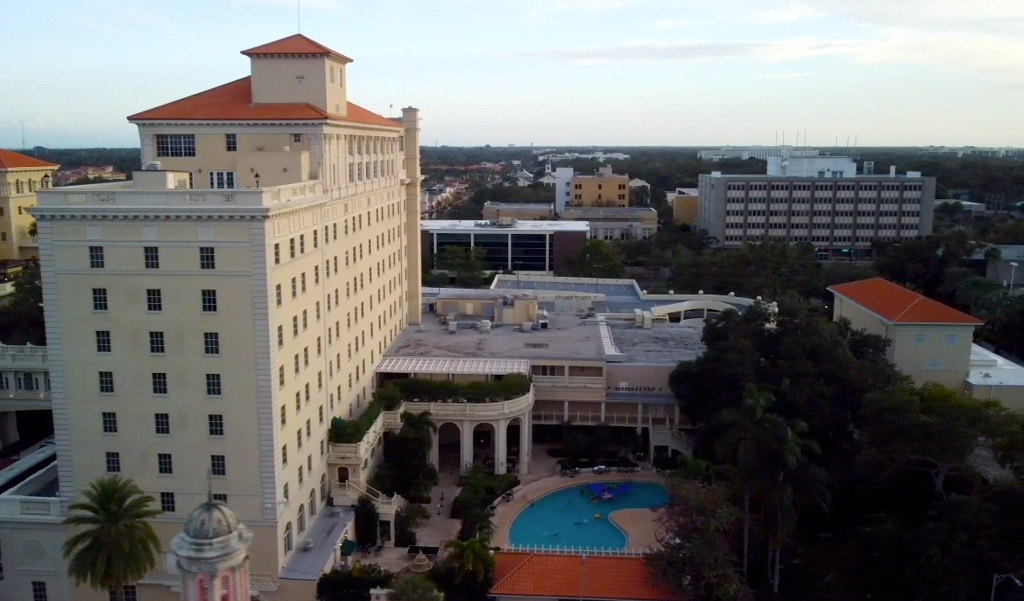
Fort Harrison Hotel (rear)

The Fort Harrison Hotel has served as the main building of the Church of Scientology's campus in Clearwater, Florida, called the Flag Land Base, since 1975. It is owned and operated by the Flag Service Organization. The hotel has 11 stories, 220 rooms, three restaurants, a swimming pool, and a ballroom. The building is connected by a skywalk to the Flag Building.

== History ==
The hotel opened in 1926 as the "New Fort Harrison Hotel", replacing the former Fort Harrison Hotel. It was built by developer Ed Haley and was used as a community center for many years. The hotel was operated by Ransom E. Olds, inventor of the Oldsmobile, from 1926 until his death in 1950.

The name comes from Fort Harrison, a Seminole War-era U.S. Army fort built in the 1830s, south of today's downtown Clearwater. The fort was named for William Henry Harrison and was the western counterpart of Fort Brooke in what became Tampa. (See also the history of Clearwater.)

In 1953, the hotel was bought by the Jack Tar Hotels and became known as the "New Fort Harrison Hotel, a Jack Tar Hotel". The company added a cabana to the pool area.

By the 1970s, the hotel began to fall into disrepair. On October 27, 1975, the Church of Scientology, as part of its plan to take over Clearwater, purchased the building under the names "Southern Land Development and Leasing Corp" and "United Churches of Florida Inc" for $2.3 million cash. In 1976, the Church of Scientology's connection and the named purchasers was reported by the St. Petersburg Times, as was the Church's plan for a $2.8 million restoration and upgrade of the hotel.

In 2007, the Church announced that the hotel would undergo another $20 million restoration project, which was completed in 2009 at a reported cost of $40 million.

In 2024, the Pinellas County Property Appraiser estimated the market value of the property at $28 million.

== Use by Scientology ==
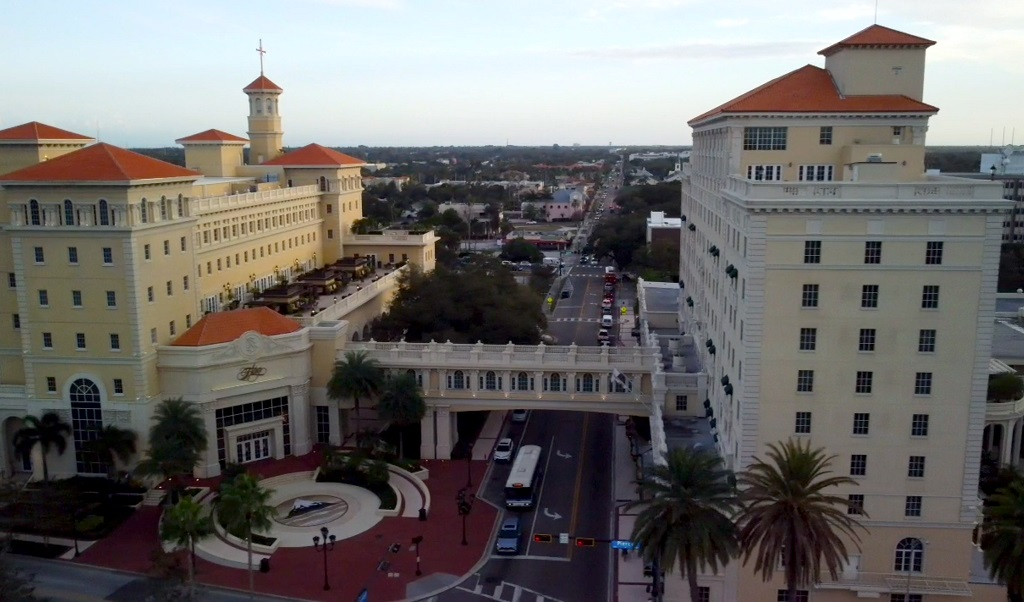
Fort Harrison Hotel (right) with skyway to the Flag Building (left)

In 1989, the Church of Scientology said the Fort Harrison Hotel was used to feed, train and house visiting practitioners. From its initial purchase, the hotel has been used for numerous functions by the Church of Scientology including staff housing, offices, restaurants, conference rooms, classrooms, a ballroom, and as a hotel for visiting practitioners. Over the years, as Scientology has expanded their real estate holdings in Clearwater, several functions have been moved to other buildings. In 2013 they opened the newly-constructed Flag Building across the street, to which they built a skyway across Ft. Harrison Avenue.

The hotel has been used for the Rehabilitation Project Force (RPF), a program used to punish Sea Org staff members for "serious deviations." RPF participants are subject to prison-like conditions, forced labor and other human rights violations.

== Notable incidents ==
In December 1926, daredevil Henry Roland scaled the building blindfolded.

The Fort Harrison Hotel has been the site of at least three suspicious deaths since 1975, most notably the death of Lisa McPherson, who died on December 5, 1995, after spending 17 days in room 174 of the building. The officially reported cause of death was a blood clot caused by dehydration and bedrest. The Church later challenged the findings of the autopsy in court. In 1997, a church spokesman acknowledged that McPherson died at the Fort Harrison, rather than on the way to the hospital. The church later retracted its spokesman's statement.

In February 1980, prior to McPherson's death, a Scientologist named Josephus A. Havenith was found dead at the Fort Harrison Hotel. He was discovered in a bathtub filled with water hot enough to have burned his skin off. The officially reported cause of death was drowning, although the coroner noted that, when he was found, Havenith's head was not submerged.

In August 1988, Scientologist Heribert Pfaff died of a seizure in the Fort Harrison Hotel. He had recently stopped taking his seizure medication in favor of a vitamin program.

In 1997, Clearwater police received over 160 emergency calls from the Fort Harrison Hotel, but they were denied entry into the hotel by Scientology security.

== Trivia ==
In 1965, the Rolling Stones wrote their hit song "(I Can't Get No) Satisfaction" at the hotel.

The hotel was once the spring training home of the Philadelphia Phillies.
