= Ultra Australia =

Music festival in Australia

- Genre: Electronic dance music
- Date: April
- Frequency: Annually
- Locations: Current Melbourne Flemington Racecourse Gold Coast Broadwater Parklands Former Sydney Parramatta Park, Australia
- Years active: 8 years
- Inaugurated: February 24, 2018
- Most recent: April 11–12, 2025
- Attendance: 46,000 (Melbourne 2026) 80,000 (Melbourne + Gold Coast + New Zealand 2026)
- Website: ultraaustralia.com

Ultra Australia is an outdoor electronic music festival that is a part of Ultra Music Festival's worldwide expansion, which has now spread to twenty three countries. Ultra Australia made its debut as a single day event under the Road to Ultra banner on 24 February 2018, and took place at the Sidney Myer Music Bowl in Melbourne, Australia.

== History ==
=== 2018 ===
The debut event as Road to Ultra Australia was a single day event held at the Sidney Myer Music Bowl on 24 February 2018 and consisted of one stage. International artists for the inaugural festival included Afrojack, Axwell, Carnage (DJ), Andrew Rayel and KSHMR. Local Australian artists who performed at the event included Will Sparks, Timmy Trumpet, Tigerlily (DJ) and Mashd N Kutcher. Over 17,000 attended the event.

=== 2019 ===
Following the success of the Road to Ultra 2018 event, the organisers announced the festival would return in 2019 as Ultra Australia, a single day event in two cities, Melbourne and Sydney held at Parramatta Park and Flemington Racecourse. The festival consisted of three stages; The Ultra Mainstage, Resistance and a local artists stage the UMF Radio stage. International artists included Martin Garrix, Marshmello, The Chainsmokers, Illenium and Slushii. More than 40,000 attended the festival in Melbourne and Sydney. Australian headliner artists included Will Sparks, Tigerlily (DJ) and Sunset Brothers.

The Resistance stage made its Australian debut at Ultra Australia. Resistance headliners included Adam Beyer, Dubfire, Nicole Moudaber and Joris Voorn

=== 2020 ===
After another successful event, the second edition of Ultra Australia was confirmed with Melbourne and Sydney again as host cities. Despite the COVID-19 pandemic outbreak beginning to cancel events globally, Ultra Australia 2020 was confirmed to still take place.

The festival again hosted three stages — the Ultra Main Stage, Resistance, and a local artists stage.[11] Ultra Australia 2020 included artists Afrojack, Eric Prydz, Dash Berlin, DJ Snake, Zedd, Deborah De Luca, Eats Everything and Markus Schulz. Local artists Tigerlily (DJ), Mashd N Kutcher, Joel Fletcher and Sunset Brothers performed.

=== 2022 - 2025 ===
Ultra Australia returned on March 5, 2022, after a hiatus due to the COVID-19 pandemic. The festival returned to Melbourne only, held at the Sidney Myer Music Bowl. The festival hosted three stages which saw international artists Alesso, Afrojack, Oliver Heldens and Steve Aoki perform. Will Sparks, Andrew Rayel and Deborah De Luca also returned to the Ultra Australia event.

2024 saw the introduction of a festival on the Gold Coast and in 2026 expanded too a 2 stages, with Gold Coast exclusive headliner Alesso

=== 2026 ===
2026 saw a separate Ultra New Zealand festival, on the same weekend and with a similar lineup

According to event organizer Travis Grech, the 3 events in Melbourne, Gold Coast and New Zealand drew a total crowd of 80,000 combined

== Events ==
| Date and Location | Headliners | Support | Stages | Crowd | REF |
|---|---|---|---|---|---|
| 24 February 2018, Melbourne: Sidney Myer Music Bowl | Afrojack, Axwell & Ingrosso | Carnage, Kshmr | Mainstage | | |
| 23 February 2019,Melbourne: Flemington Racecourse 24 February 2019, Sydney: Parramatta Park, | Adam Beyer, The Chainsmokers, Dubfire b2b Nicole Moudaber, Illenium, Marshmello, Martin Garrix | Jorisvoorn, Slushii | Mainstage Resistance Radio | | |
| 7 March 2020, Sydney: Parramatta Park 8 March 2020, Melbourne: Flemington Racecourse | Afrojack, Dash Berlin, DJ Snake, Eric Prydz, Luciano, Zedd | Deborah De Luca, Eats Everything Markus Schulz UMEK | Mainstage Resistance Radio | | |
| 5 March 2022,Melbourne: Sidney Myer Music Bowl | Afrojack, Alesso, Oliver Heldens, Steve Aoki Deborah De Luca, Nicole Moudaber | Andrew Rayel, Coone, Frank Walker, Sam Feldt, Will Sparks | Mainstage Resistance Radio | | |
| 15 April 2023,Melbourne: Sidney Myer Music Bowl | Darren Styles, Deborah De Luca, Hardwell, Sub Zero Project, Timmy Trumpet | ACRAZE, Ben Gold, Ferry Corsten, Jonas Blue, Joyhauser, Juliet Fox, Sneujder, Solarstone, | Mainstage Resistance Radio Park Stage | | |
| 12 April 2024, Gold Coast: Broadwater Parklands | Armin van Buuren, Brennan Heart, Darren Styles, Steve Aoki, Zedd | Topic, Will Sparks | Beach | | |
| 13 April 2024, Melbourne: Flemington Racecourse | Armin van Buuren, Brennan Heart, Carl Cox, Darren Styles, Steve Aoki, Zedd | Anna Tur, Christopher Coe, Jeffrey Sutorius, Juliet Fox,Topic, Will Atkinson, Will Sparks | Mainstage Resistance Radio | | |
| 11 April 2025, Gold Coast: Broadwater Parklands | Axwell, Da Tweekaz, Knock2, Martin Garrix, Sub Zero Project | Blasterjaxx, Joel Corry, | Beach | | |
| 12 April 2025, Melbourne: Flemington Racecourse | Axwell, Da Tweekaz, Deborah De Luca, Knock2, Martin Garrix, Sub Zero Project | Blasterjaxx, Byorn, Joel Corry, Nora En Pure, Simon Patterson | Mainstage Resistance Radio | | |
| 11 April 2026, Melbourne: Flemington Racecourse | The Chainsmokers, DJ Snake, Darren Styles, Marlo, Miss Monique, Nico Moreno, Oliver Heldens, Zedd | Dimatik, Fatima Hajji, HILO, Kazze, Oscar L, Rebuke, RIVO | Mainstage Resistance Resistance2 Radio | 46,000 | |
| 12 April 2026, Gold Coast: Broadwater Parklands | ~~Alesso~~ (Canceled),The Chainsmokers, DJ Snake, Darren Styles, Marlo, Miss Monique, Nico Moreno, Oliver Heldens | Kaaze | Beach Radio | | |

== See also ==
- Russell Faibisch
- Ultra Music Festival
- Ultra Brasil
- Ultra Buenos Aires
- Ultra Chile
- Ultra Japan
- Ultra Korea
- Ultra Bali
- Ultra Singapore
- Ultra Europe
- Road to Ultra
