= Ultra China =

Music festival

- Status: Active
- Genre: Electronic music festival
- Locations: Shanghai, China
- Years active: September 2017 (Shanghai)
- Organizer: Ultra Worldwide
- Website: umfchina.com

Ultra China is a two-day electronic music festival that is a part of Ultra Music Festival's worldwide expansion, which has now spread to twenty-three countries. The inaugural edition of Ultra China will be taking place in Shanghai, China on 9–10 September 2017.

== 2017 ==
The inaugural edition of Ultra China took place at the Shanghai Expo Park and featured three stages-the Ultra Main Stage, Resistance, and the Ultra Park Stage. The lineup included the likes of Armin van Buuren, Sam Feldt, Slushii, Axwell & Ingrosso, Martin Garrix, Porter Robinson, Getter, Nicky Romero, DJ Snake, The Chainsmokers, Unjin, Zedd, Sasha & John Digweed, Technasia, Dubfire, Carl Cox, and many more. Ultra China's first edition drew an attendance of over 40,000 people.

== See also ==
- List of electronic dance music festivals
- Ultra Music Festival
- Russell Faibisch
- Ultra Brasil
- Ultra Chile
- Ultra Japan
- Ultra Korea
- Ultra Singapore
- Ultra South Africa
- Ultra Europe
- Ultra Bali
- Road to Ultra
