= Ultra Music Festival =

Electronic dance music festival in Miami

Coordinates: 25.784773°N 80.186934°W

- Genre: Electronic dance music
- Date: March 27–29 (2026)
- Locations: Most recent Bayfront Park, Miami (2001–2005, 2012–18, 2022–); Previous; Collins Park, Miami Beach (1999–2000); Bicentennial Park, Miami (2006–11); Virginia Key, Miami (2019); International spin-offs For full list, see here
- Years active: 1999–present
- Founders: Russell Faibisch; Alex Omes
- Attendance: 165,000 (2026, 3 days total)
- Capacity: 55,000 (all stages combined)
- Organiser: Ultra Enterprises Inc.
- Website: ultramusicfestival.com

The Ultra Music Festival (UMF) is an annual outdoor electronic music festival that takes place in March in Miami, Florida. The festival was founded in 1999 by Russell Faibisch and Alex Omes.

It was first held on Miami Beach, but besides a tenure at Bicentennial Park, and briefly being held at Virginia Key in 2019, it has primarily been held at Bayfront Park in downtown Miami. It was a 2-day festival from 1999 to 2010.

Since 2011, Ultra has taken place across 3 days (Friday through Sunday) during the month of March. In 2012, it had a record attendance of 155,000 people over 3 days. In 2013, the festival took place across two consecutive weekends to celebrate its 15th anniversary, with a combined attendance of 330,000 people. In 2014, the festival returned to its original single-weekend format, selling out pre-sale tickets in under five minutes. The city of Miami has estimated that since 2012, Ultra has "generated approximately $995 million of economic impact", with $168 million in 2018 alone. The festival was suspended in 2020 and 2021 due to the COVID-19 pandemic but resumed in 2022.

The festival is held alongside the Winter Music Conference—an event focusing on the electronic music industry (which was acquired by Ultra outright in 2018), and Miami Music Week—a larger program of electronic music concerts and parties held across the region, with both events usually leading into Ultra.

Although they share names, Ultra Music Festival was not directly tied to Ultra Records, an electronic music record label. In fact, the companies (Ultra Music Festival's formal corporate name was Ultra Enterprises, Inc.) were courtroom adversaries in litigation resulting in a two week jury trial in 2012 in federal court in the Southern District of New York. The parties disputed whether Ultra Music Festival could use "UMF" outside of Florida and whether Ultra Records had improperly started using the name "Ultra Music" and a confusingly similar logo. However, the dispute was resolved via an out of court settlement, and the two entities announced a "global alliance" in August 2012, which would allow them to collaborate on marketing and cross-promotion.

Alongside the flagship event in Miami, Ultra has spawned a larger series of international franchises under the blanket branding Ultra Worldwide, which have included locations such as Croatia, South Africa, South Korea, Singapore, Mexico, Brazil, Colombia, and others.

== History ==
=== The Beach (1999-2000) ===
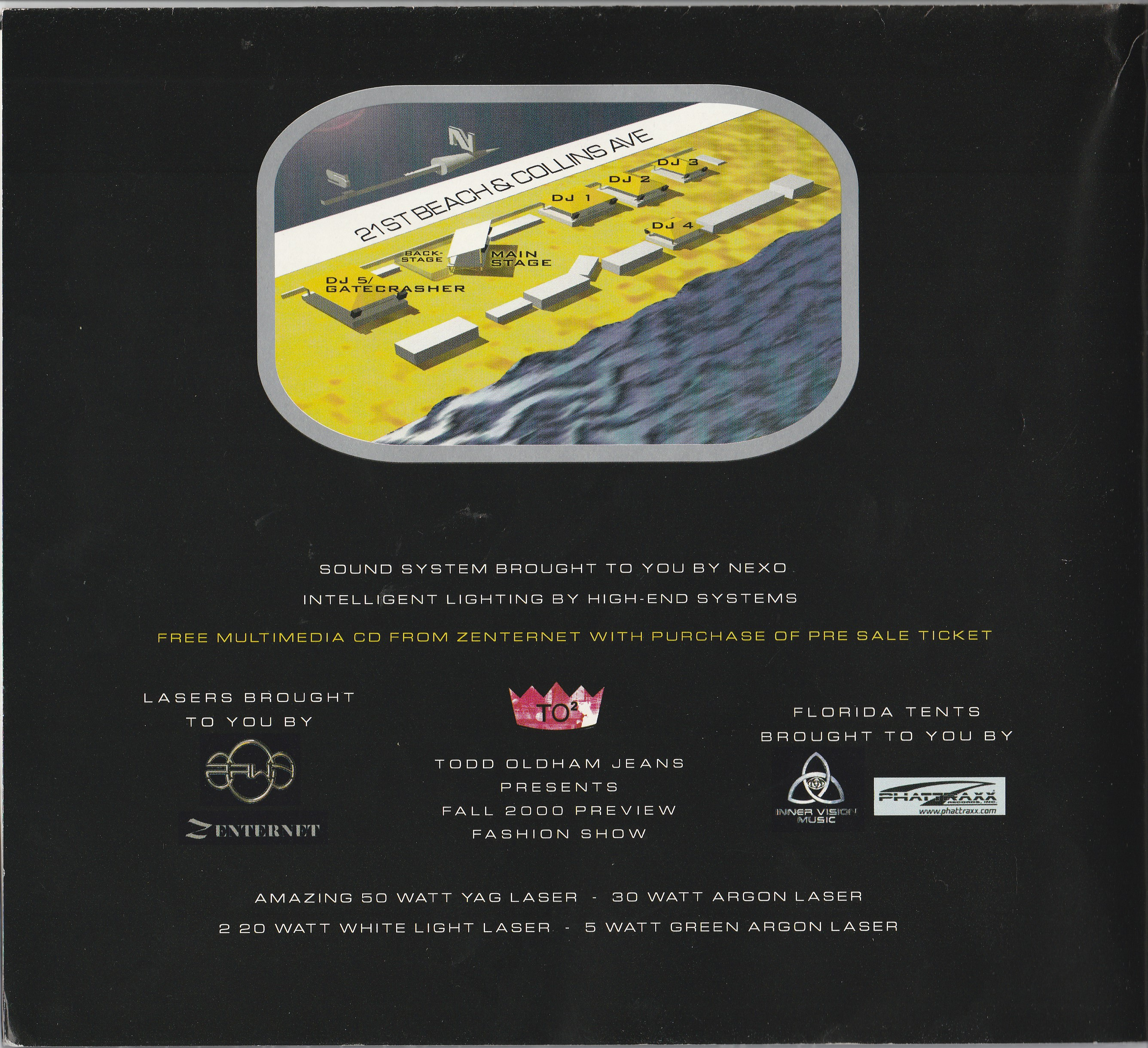
Ultra Music Festival #2 Year 2000

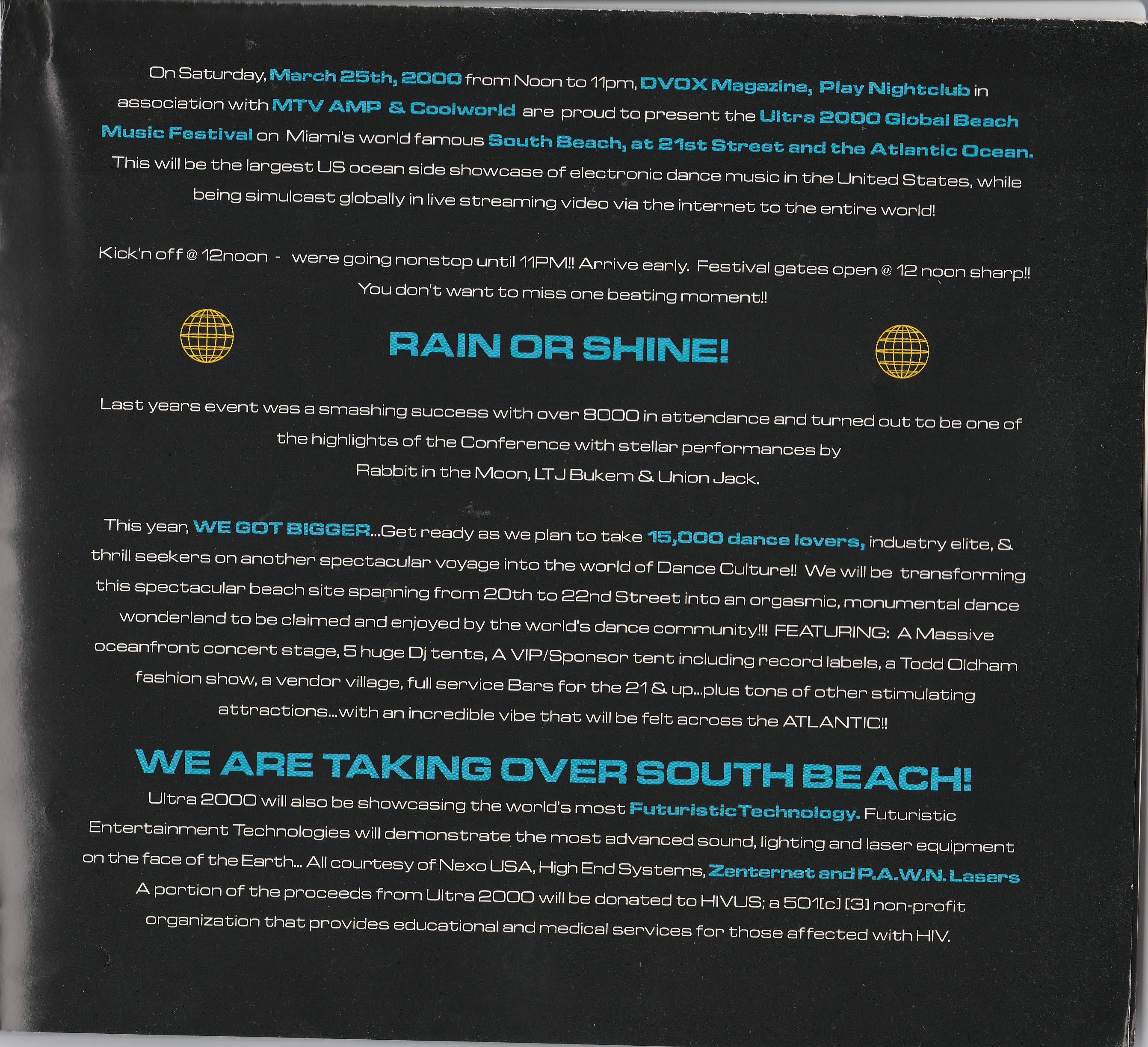
Ultra Music Festival #2 Year 2000

Ultra Music Festival was inaugurated and produced in 1999 by business partners Russell Faibisch, Ray Navarro and Alex Omes. The festival was named after the 1997 album of the same name by English band Depeche Mode. The first festival was held as a one-day event on March 13, 1999. Artists at Ultra's first festival included Paul van Dyk, Rabbit in the Moon, Josh Wink, and DJ Baby Anne. The first Ultra Beach Music Festival, which was held at Collins Park in Miami Beach proved popular, with an estimated ten thousand concertgoers in attendance. However, Faibisch and Omes still saw a financial loss of between $10,000 to $20,000 during the festival's inaugural year.

However, in March 2000 the festival returned to South Beach's Collins Park and was met with even more success. The festival was immediately renewed for a third year.

=== Growth ===
Due to the massive rise in attendance between 1999 and 2000, festival organizers decided to relocate to Bayfront Park in downtown Miami for Ultra's third annual event in 2001. Ultra Music Festival continued to bring the biggest names in electronic dance music to Miami with performances by Robin Fox, Tiësto, Eddie G Miami, Armin van Buuren, EC Twins, Paul van Dyk, Paul Oakenfold, Ferry Corsten, Sander Kleinenberg, Photek, Josh Wink, DJ Craze, Pete Tong, Erick Morillo, and Rabbit in the Moon from 2001 to 2005. In 2005, Fabisch met with Adam Russakoff, who has since been the executive producer, director of business affairs, and talent buyer for Ultra Music Festival and Ultra Worldwide. 2005 was also the year that Carl Cox and Ultra worked together to curate the Carl Cox and Friends Arena, formerly known as the Carl Cox Global Arena, which has been a mainstay at Ultra Music Festival ever since. With the record-breaking attendance of the seventh annual Ultra Music Festival in 2005, the festival was again relocated to another venue, Bicentennial Park, for 2006. In 2007, the festival held its first 2-day event at Bicentennial Park with more than 50,000 concert goers in attendance, which was another record at the time for Ultra. The festival celebrated its 10th anniversary during March 28–29, 2008 with performances by Tiësto, Underworld, Justice, Paul van Dyk, Carl Cox, Armin van Buuren, MSTRKRFT, deadmau5, Annie Mac, Eric Prydz, Ferry Corsten, Calvin Harris, Moby, Eddie G Miami, The Crystal Method, Boys Noize, Benny Benassi, Armand van Helden, The Bravery, David Guetta, and many more.

=== 2009 ===
With an estimated attendance of over 70,000 people over 2 days, Ultra Music Festival set a new record for the City of Miami for the number of tickets sold at a single event. The eleventh annual edition of the festival occurred during March 27–28, 2009—the lineup included more crossover acts and live bands featuring the likes of the Black Eyed Peas, the Prodigy, the Ting Tings, Santigold, Crystal Castles, the Whip, and Perry Farrell. Ultra's twelfth edition took place during March 26–27, 2010, featuring exclusive performances from Tiësto, deadmau5, Groove Armada, Orbital, Little Boots, Sasha & Digweed, Above & Beyond, Armin van Buuren, Carl Cox, Swedish House Mafia and the Bloody Beetroots. Each stage was accompanied by visual arts provided by VJs Vello Virkhaus, Psyberpixie, and Cozer.

=== 2011 ===
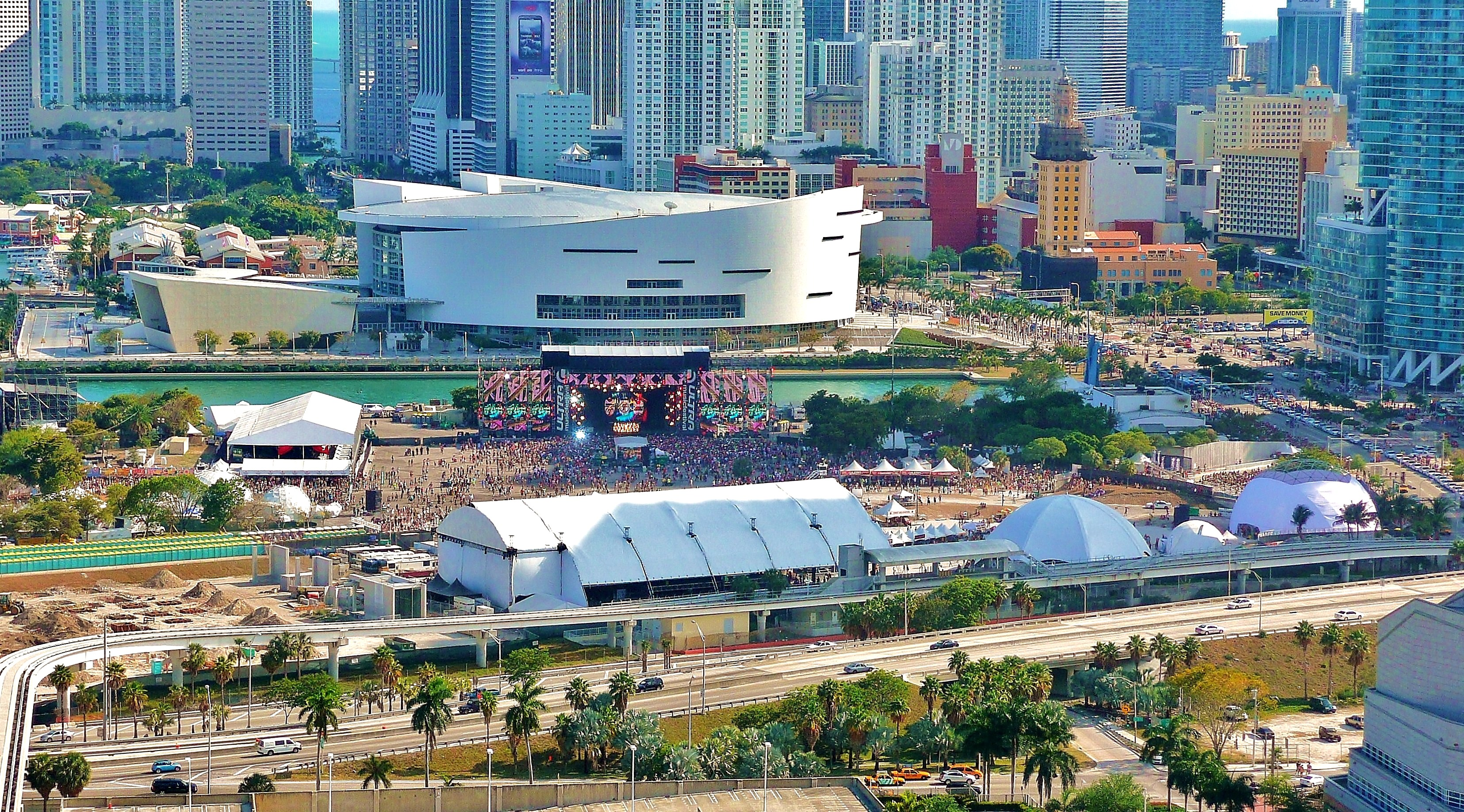
Aerial view of Ultra Miami 2011

The festival sold out for the first time with over 100,000 attendees, where it was also announced that the thirteenth annual edition would take place over the course of three days during March 2011. Ultra Music Festival expanded to a three-day festival in 2011, spanning the weekend of March 25–27, 2011. Also at Ultra's 2011 edition, Armin van Buuren debuted a stage dedicated to his radio show, A State of Trance, celebrating 500 episodes. Like the Carl Cox & Friends Arena, the A State of Trance stage continues to be a mainstay at Ultra Music Festival, taking place on the third day of the festival each year. The A State of Trance 500 stage featured artists like Ferry Corsten, Markus Schulz, ATB, Cosmic Gate, Gareth Emery, Sander van Doorn, Alex M.O.R.P.H., and more.

=== 2012 ===
The fourteenth edition of Ultra Music Festival was held from March 23–25, 2012. Due to the construction of the Miami Art Museum at Bicentennial Park, the event was moved back to Bayfront Park for the first time since 2005. Beginning this year, the festival also began to produce an official live streaming broadcast.

Early bird pre-sale tickets for Ultra Music Festival 2012 sold out within seconds. Shortly after, pre sale ticket prices increased from $149 to $229. The lineup was headlined by acts such as Kraftwerk, Bassnectar, Justice, Avicii, Fatboy Slim, Wolfgang Gartner, Richie Hawtin, Skrillex, Pretty Lights, M83, Duck Sauce, Kaskade, and others. Madonna made a surprise guest appearance to introduce Avicii, in support of his remix of "Girl Gone Wild" — the second single from her recently released album MDNA.

=== 2013 ===
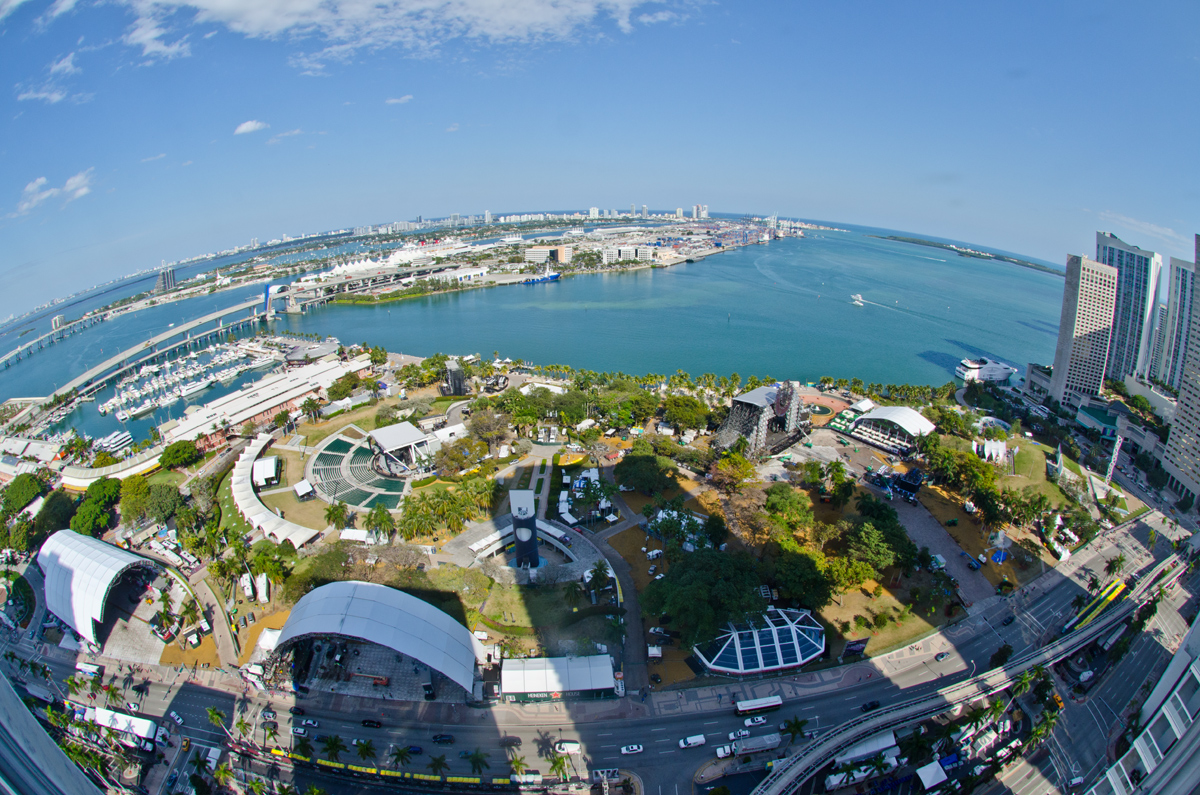
Panorama of Bayfront Park, taken the Thursday before the second weekend.

In honor of its fifteenth anniversary, the 2013 edition was held over two weekends, March 15–17, 2013, and March 22–24, 2013. Phase one of the festival's lineup was officially revealed in January 2013, confirming appearances from David Guetta, deadmau5, and Tiësto on both weekends, along with Swedish House Mafia (serving as the final two performances of their farewell tour One Last Tour). Other notable headliners included Afrojack, Avicii (whose set extensively showcased new songs from his upcoming album True), Calvin Harris, Richie Hawtin, Boys Noize, Carl Cox, Armin van Buuren, Alesso, Dog Blood (Skrillex and Boys Noize), Luciano, Snoop Dogg, The Weeknd, Martin Solveig, and Zedd.

On January 7, 2013, after organizers requested additional road closures for the event, Miami Commissioner Marc Sarnoff proposed a resolution calling for disapproval of the second weekend. Sarnoff believed that allowing the event to be held across two weekends would be "disruptive to the local business community and area residents due to noise, nuisance behavior of festival goers, and grid lock traffic," regardless of the fact that Ultra generated $79 million during its previous year. The city council voted in favor of continuing with the second weekend on January 10, 2013, charging the organizers for police and fire services. The two weekends had a total attendance of 330,000 spectators.

=== 2014 ===
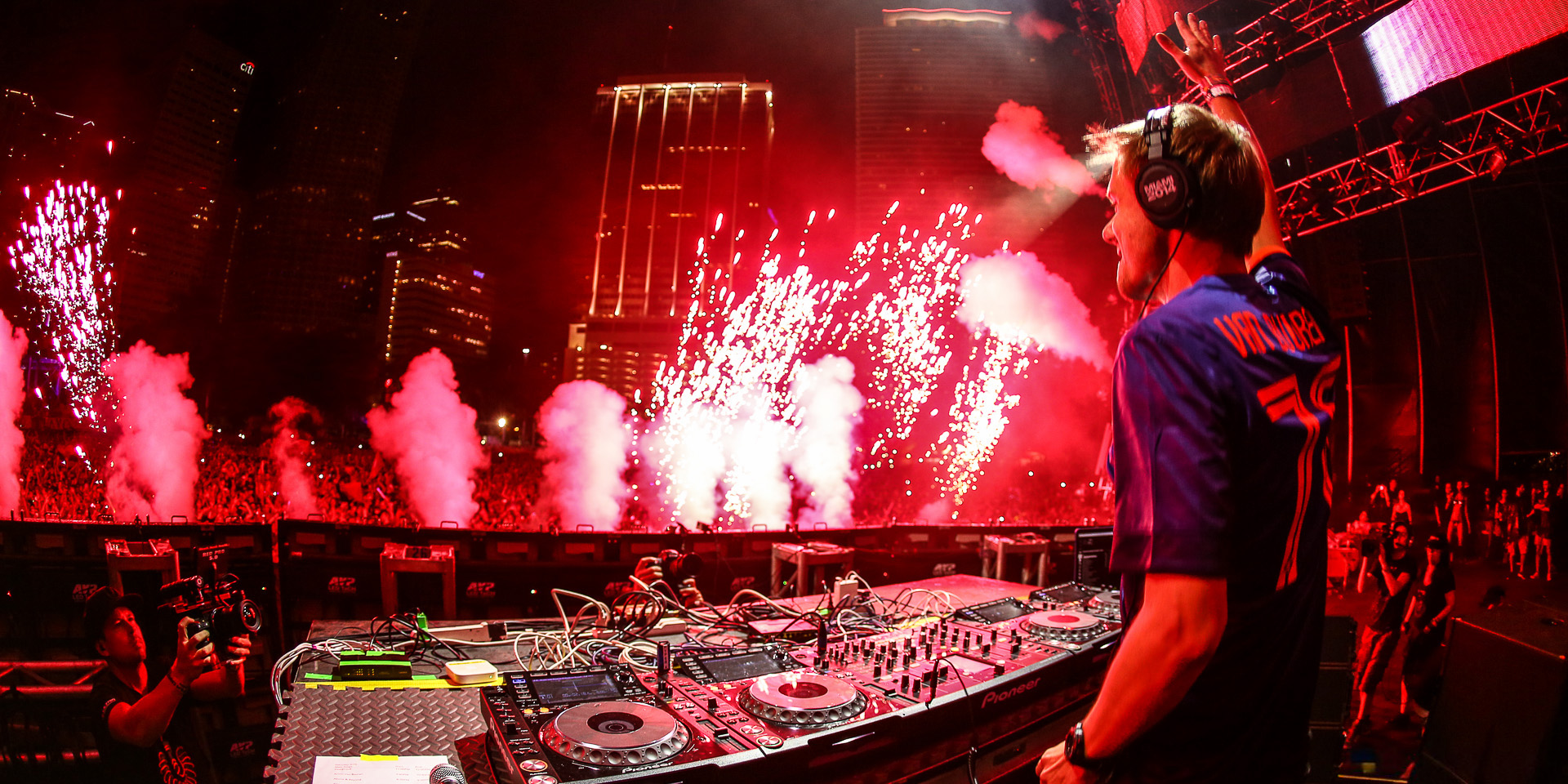
Armin van Buuren performing on the Ultra Miami 2014 Main Stage

For 2014, the festival returned to a single weekend, which took place March 28–30. Phase one of the festival lineup was unveiled in December 2013, confirming headline appearances by major acts including Armin van Buuren, Afrojack, Carl Cox, David Guetta, Hardwell, Fedde Le Grand, Krewella, Martin Garrix, New World Punx, Nicky Romero, Tiësto, and Zedd. After being diagnosed with a blocked gallbladder and going back to Sweden for surgery, deadmau5 replaced Avicii as the final act on the Main Stage for Saturday.

Notable performances during the festival included the premiere of Eric Prydz's new live show "Holo", the debut of Diplo and Skrillex's new side project Jack Ü, Above & Beyond's set being interrupted by a rainstorm (requiring them and their equipment to be moved backstage and facing away from the audience; the duo considered it to be one of their "more unusual gigs"), the debut performance of Armin van Buuren and Benno de Goeij's duo Gaia, and deadmau5 "trolling" the audience during his set by playing a remix of Martin Garrix's "Animals" set to "Old McDonald Had a Farm".

On March 28, a security guard was left in "extremely critical" condition after being trampled by a crowd of people attempting to gate crash the festival by breaking down a chain-link fence.

=== 2015 ===
==== Preparation ====
After the gatecrashing incident in 2014, some uncertainties arose as to whether Ultra would take place; however, organizers proceeded to announce the 2015 event would run March 27–29. Organizers also announced plans for a comprehensive review of the festival's security arrangements with the involvement of the Miami Police Department, which assessed how security could be improved to "prevent a criminal incident of this nature from happening again." Following the incident, Miami mayor Tomás Regalado suggested that the gatecrashing incident could be deemed a breach of the organizers' contract with the city, which would block Ultra from being held in Miami.

In a meeting on April 24, 2014, Miami commissioners voted 4 to 1 against banning the festival, allowing Ultra to remain in downtown Miami for 2015. Marc Sarnoff, the lone commissioner to vote in favor of banning Ultra, presented footage of lewd behavior by attendees at previous editions, and contended that the event affected the quality of life for downtown residents because they were being harassed by visitors. The remaining commissioners supported the festival's presence because of the exposure and positive economic effects it brings to Miami, and Keon Hardemon disputed the argument that it affected downtown residents, as they, in his opinion, chose to live in the city so they could participate in local events. However, the approval was made on the condition that organizers introduce facilities for addressing security, drug usage and lewd behavior by attendees. In a related move, Ultra announced in September 2014 that it would no longer admit attendees under the age of 18, in order to improve the overall safety and experience of attendees. Additionally organizers hired the retiring Miami Beach Police Chief Ray Martinez to oversee security for future events.

On January 12, 2015, Ultra co-founder Alex Omes, who had left the organization in 2010, was found dead at the age of 43 from a drug overdose.

==== Performances ====
The 2015 lineup included Andrew Bayer, Avicii, Andy C, Axwell, Dash Berlin, Dirty South, Eric Prydz, Galantis, Hardwell, Hot Since 82, Martin Garrix, Sebastian Ingrosso, Steve Angello, Zeds Dead, and others. The event was formally closed by Skrillex, later joined by Diplo as Jack Ü, and featuring guest vocalists such as CL ("Dirty Vibe", "MTBD"), Kiesza ("Take Ü There"), Sean Combs (who joined CL with a rendition of "It's All About the Benjamins"), and Justin Bieber for Jack Ü's new single "Where Are Ü Now". Video game streaming website Twitch took over as the host of the festival's official webcast.

A new stage area known as Resistance was also introduced for 2015, which focused upon lesser-known "underground" electronic musicians in genres such as deep house and techno, and featured a 360-degree stage installation known as "Afterburner", designed by the British collective Arcadia Spectacular.

=== 2016 ===
The initial lineup of the 2016 edition, held March 18–20, 2016 was announced on December 16, 2015; among others, it was revealed that the festival would feature the reunions of Rabbit in the Moon and Pendulum, along with other headliners such as Afrojack, Avicii, Carl Cox, Die Antwoord, Dubfire, Eric Prydz, Hardwell, Kaskade, Kygo, Miike Snow, Nero, Purity Ring, Tycho, and others. Phase two of the lineup was announced in February 2016, including AlunaGeorge, Andrew Rayel, The Chainsmokers, Crystal Castles, deadmau5, Galantis, Laidback Luke, Marshmello, Richie Hawtin, Sam Feldt, DJ Snake, Steve Angello, and Tchami. General admission tickets sold out on January 21, 2016.

As band member Maxim was unable to attend due to medical issues, The Prodigy cancelled their Saturday night performance. Deadmau5 took their place, alongside his previously scheduled A State of Trance performance on Sunday. Pendulum formally closed the festival on Sunday night, in a set featuring featuring guest appearances by Tom Morello and Deadmau5 (the latter for "Ghosts 'n' Stuff"—which features Pendulum's Rob Swire), and a segment with Swire and Gareth McGrillen playing as their side project Knife Party. The Resistance stage also returned, which featured Arcadia Spectacular's "Spider".

In April 2016, DJ Mag named Ultra the world's top festival as the result of their survey.

=== 2017 ===
Immediately upon the conclusion of the 2016 edition, it was announced that the 2017 edition would be held from March 24–26. Tickets officially went on sale on October 4, 2016. General admission tickets sold out on January 24, 2017.

Phase 1 of the 2017 lineup was announced on November 17, 2016, listing live headliners including Ice Cube, Justice, Major Lazer, The Prodigy, Underworld, and headlining DJ acts Above & Beyond, Afrojack, Armin van Buuren, Axwell & Ingrosso, Carl Cox, Dash Berlin, David Guetta, DJ Snake, Dubfire, Hardwell, Jamie Jones, Joseph Capriati, Maceo Plex, Marco Carola, Martin Garrix, Sasha & John Digweed, Steve Aoki, Tale of Us, and Tiesto. The first phase of artists for Resistance was released on December 3, 2017, including Black Coffee, Chris Liebing, Eats Everything, Kolsch, The Martinez Brothers, Technasia, and others. It was also announced that Carl Cox had been named the "global ambassador" of Resistance—overseeing production and DJ booking for future endeavors under the Resistance brand. As a result, the Megastructure's Carl Cox & Friends lineup was also rebranded under the Resistance title, alongside its existing presence on the Arcadia Spider stage.

Phase 2 of the lineup was unveiled on February 9, 2017, and included the additions of Adventure Club, Alan Walker, Barclay Crenshaw, Cedric Gervais, Don Diablo, Ferry Corsten presents Gouryella, Jai Wolf, Laidback Luke, Rezz, Sam Feldt, Showtek, Slushii, Sunnery James & Ryan Marciano, Tchami, Vini Vici, and others. Phase 3 and the final schedule were unveiled on March 9, 2017, including among others DJ Cosmo DJ Snake served as the final Main Stage act on Sunday, featuring a guest appearance by Future.

A concert film of the 2017 edition is available to watch. Presented by Andrea Helfrich and Will Best, this original concert film features exclusive interviews, behind-the-scenes clips, and live sets from appearing artists.

=== 2018 ===
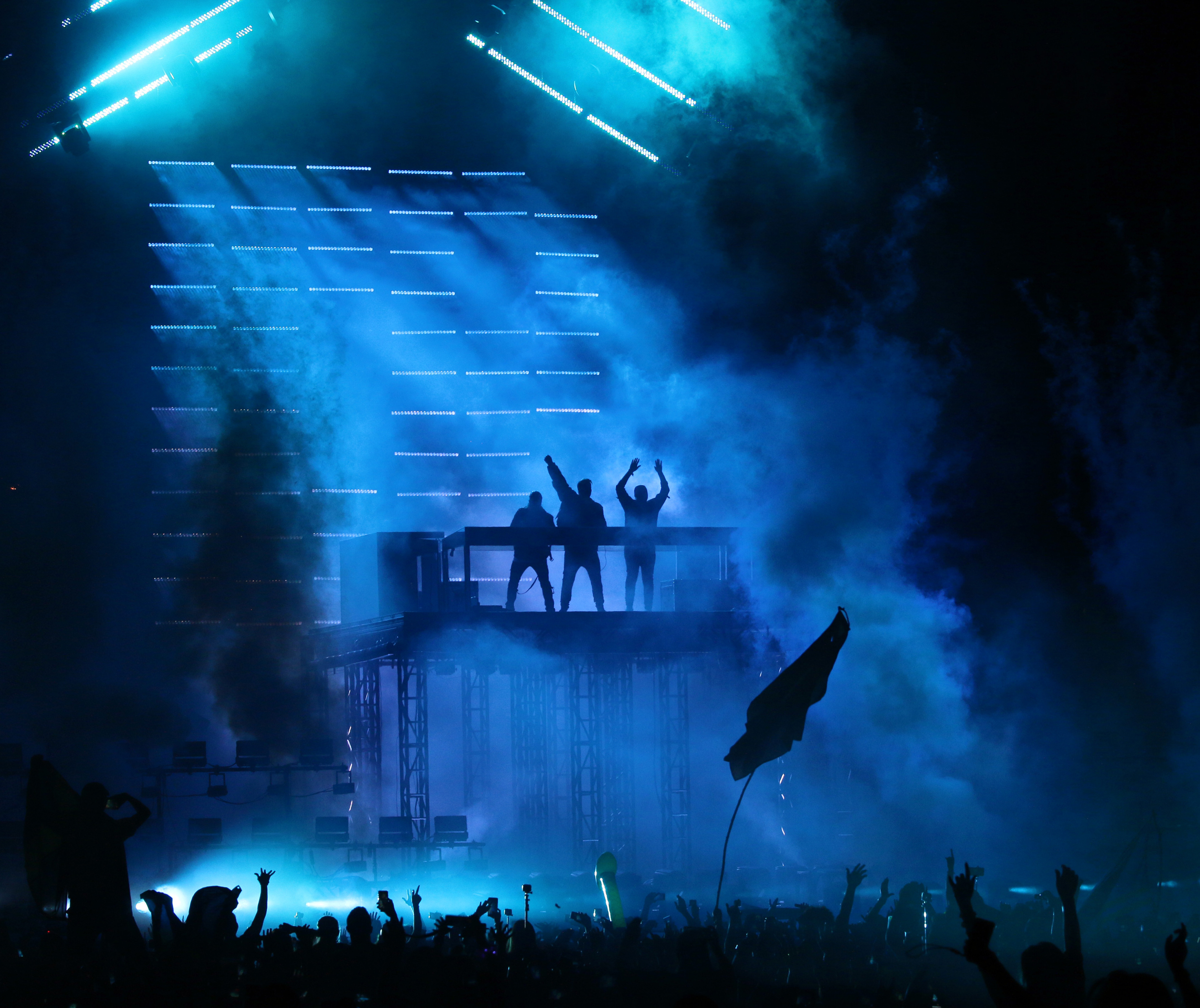
Swedish House Mafia's reunion set at Ultra Miami 2018.

Phase 1 of the lineup for the festival's 20th edition, held March 23–25 was unveiled December 18, 2017, including Afrojack, Axwell & Ingrosso, Azealia Banks, The Chainsmokers, David Guetta, DJ Snake, Empire of the Sun, Hardwell, and Steve Aoki among others. This was followed by the unveiling of the lineup for Resistance on January 28, 2018, including Adam Beyer, Carl Cox, Dubfire, Nicole Moudaber, as well as Jackmaster, Eats Everything, Seth Troxler and Skream's supergroup J.E.S.u.S. among others. On February 25, 2018, phase 2 of the lineup was unveiled, including Benny Benassi, Cedric Gervais, DubVision, Fischerspooner, Jauz, Modestep, Oliver Heldens, Djsky, and others. The full schedule was unveiled on March 15, featuring Dash Berlin, G-Eazy, KSHMR, and others. It was also revealed that both the main and A State of Trance stages would feature unannounced headliners as closing acts on the final night.

Swedish House Mafia closed the festival in their first live appearance as a group since 2013; rumors suggesting Daft Punk would appear were dispelled by Steve Angello having cancelled tour dates in Asia that coincided with the festival, as well as SHM-related signs and imagery having appeared throughout the city. Other notable special guests throughout the festival included K-pop singer and Girls' Generation member Yuri (who performed alongside Raiden), Daddy Yankee, Elvis Crespo and Play-N-Skillz (who joined Steve Aoki on their new song "Azukita", with Daddy Yankee also performing his own "Gasolina"), Example, Adventure Club, and Crankdat (who all joined Jauz on the Main Stage), as well as G-Eazy ("No Limit"), Lil Uzi Vert, Slushii, Yo Gotti ("Rake It Up"), and Will Smith ("Miami") who were all brought on as guests during Marshmello's set.

Security officials stated that the 2018 edition of Ultra was the "safest" in recent years, reporting only 27 arrests in total during the festival (related particularly to narcotics, ticket counterfeiting, and an attendee physically attacking a police officer) and no "major" incidents.

=== 2019 ===
==== Move to Virginia Key ====
The 2019 edition was held from March 29–31, 2019. On September 27, 2018, the commissioners of Miami voted unanimously against allowing the festival to be hosted at Bayfront Park, citing noise complaints and other concerns among downtown residents.

In November 2018, festival organizers proposed moving Ultra to the barrier island of Virginia Key, using the Historic Virginia Key Beach Park and the Miami Marine Stadium as venues. Virginia Key is accessible from mainland Miami via the Rickenbacker Causeway, which also provides access to the island and community of Key Biscayne. The proposal was met with resistance from officials in Key Biscayne, citing the possibility of safety, noise, and environmental concerns, as well as increased traffic on the Rickenbacker Causeway.

Prior to a meeting and vote on the matter, the village began campaigning against the festival. It published a video on Facebook narrated by mayor Michael Davey, warning that hosting Ultra would result in "environmental destruction, noise and an increase in alcohol and drug-related violence". Organizers dismissed the video as disparaging and being "potentially criminaliz[ing]" to its attendees, and stated that they would be interested in an "open-minded and good-faith dialogue" with the community. On November 15, 2018, the Miami commissioners successfully voted in favor of allowing Ultra to be held at the Miami Marine Stadium and Historic Virginia Key Beach Park.

Concerns were presented over the festival's effects on local wildlife; the island features a number of sensitive wildlife areas and hosts various endangered species, and the University of Miami's Rosenstiel School of Marine, Atmospheric, and Earth Science displayed concerns that the loud music produced by the event could disrupt marine habitats, and in turn, research projects being undertaken by the school. Organizers stated that they expected to place more of the stages in the parking lots surrounding the Miami Marine Stadium than the beach. Ultra Worldwide announced a sustainability initiative known as "Mission: Home" ahead of the 2019 festival, which would include a "leave no trace" policy, and "enhanced" recycling program, banning single-use plastic cups and straws (requiring vendors to use paper or otherwise compostable cups and packaging), using "close proximity pyrotechnic alternatives" to traditional fireworks to reduce pollution and debris.

A competing techno festival known as Rapture had been held at the Historic Virginia Key Beach Park on the same weekend as Ultra since 2017. In February 2019, the organizers of Rapture attempted to sue Ultra and the city of Miami under antitrust grounds, claiming that they had already booked the site for two of the same dates as Ultra. The suit was dismissed by a judge, who argued that both Rapture and Ultra had submitted applications, but that only Ultra's was actually accepted. Rapture submitted a revised complaint, but the suit was rejected once again, with the judge ruling that Rapture's claims of violations of the Sherman Antitrust Act were "baseless". The following month, the city of Miami was sued again by the Brickell Homeowners Association, who alleged that the city violated its charter by misrepresenting its agreement with the festival as being a "license" but appearing to be a lease, which requires competitive bidding under Florida law. Judge Rodolfo Ruiz denied a motion requesting an emergency injunction.

==== Festival ====
Phase 1 of the lineup was unveiled December 20, 2018, featuring returning acts such as Carl Cox, The Chainsmokers, Deadmau5 (including a set that featured the debut of his new "Cube 3.0" stage setup, and a techno set as testpilot), Marshmello, Martin Garrix, and others. Historic Virginia Key Beach Park would host "Resistance Island", a three-stage area featuring the traditional Megastructure, "Arrival" (a setup from the Carl Cox-backed Burning Man sound camp Playground), and "Reflector". The remainder of the lineup was released March 12, 2019.

Concerns over transportation were realized on the first night of the festival: as it approached its closure at 2:00 a.m., an influx of leaving attendees resulted in disorderly lines for shuttles back to the mainland. Attendees reported that staff members were also unhelpful in guiding them towards the correct pickup points, while many elected to instead walk down the causeway's William Powell Bridge—a roughly 2.5 mi (4.0 km) walk, plus additional travel time needed to make it back to hotels or transport hubs (taxis and ride sharing services were not allowed to perform pickups directly on the island). This, in turn, prompted the shuttles to eventually suspend operations due to the influx of pedestrian traffic on the causeway.

The following morning, Ultra's organizers apologized for the issues, stating that they had been working with the city to address shortcomings in its transit plans (including clearer signage, and a dedicated bus lane on the bridge), and that it would keep concessions, vendors, and additional music programming open past 2:00 a.m. for the remainder of the festival. While lines were still reported, the transit situation was considered to have been improved on subsequent nights.

Owing to its success in 2019, Ultra Worldwide would extend the Mission: Home initiative to all of its events going forward.

=== 2020 ===
==== Return to Bayfront Park ====
Mayor of Key Biscayne Michael Davey stated that Ultra "did the best they could, but it's just not the right place". Miami mayor Carlos A. Giménez admitted that Virginia Key may not have been the best location for the event, due to the lack of transportation options and the sheer number of attendees. Despite the move intending to reduce disruption to them, downtown residents still reported excessive noise, vibrations, and lights coming from the site.

Following the festival, Ultra pulled out of its contract with Key Biscayne, deeming that the event was "simply not good enough" at its new location, and stating that it planned to move to a new location in South Florida for 2020 (with the possibility of it being held outside of Miami proper). On May 19, 2019, the Miami City Commission proposed a resolution to allow Ultra to return to Bayfront Park, citing its cultural and economic impact on the city.

The terms required a minimum $2 million payment annually, granted the city revenue of ticket surcharges if they exceed $2 million (this minimum will begin to increase annually on the third year of the license), included restrictions on how long Ultra would be able to occupy and restrict access to Bayfront Park (up to a month, with the park only closed for 14 days), and capped capacity of the event site to 55,000 (although that number could increase with the city's approval). After receiving a deferral at the June 27, 2019, commission meeting, the item returned to the meeting agenda on July 25, 2019, with additional stipulations, including volume limits and further clarifications of park closure dates and restrictions.

The resolution was met with intense debate from both sides, but the Commission ultimately voted 3–2 in favor. On July 31, 2019, Ultra officially announced that the 2020 edition was tentatively scheduled for March 20–22, 2020, at Bayfront Park, with ticket sales beginning August 6, 2019.

==== Cancellation due to COVID-19 ====
On March 4, 2020, Mayor Francis Suarez and commissioner Joe Carollo called for Ultra to be rescheduled due to concerns surrounding the COVID-19 pandemic. A public health emergency was declared in Florida after two cases were confirmed in Manatee County and Hillsborough County. Later that day, commissioner Manolo Reyes told the Miami Herald that following a meeting between organizers and local officials, Ultra and the city had agreed to cancel the 2020 edition. Suarez said that if Ultra had not agreed to this decision, the city would have the power to cancel the event under the existing contract.

Ultra was one of the first major U.S. music festivals to be cancelled due to the pandemic. The festival was expected to bring in about 165,000 people from around the world to the 2020 event. It had generated approximately $1 billion in overall economic impacts, and in 2019, it produced a total of $168 million and generated 1,834 jobs. Since the announcement to cancel the event, ticket purchasers were notified that they will not receive full refunds. Instead, purchasers were informed to claim their benefits as part of a value package which included the following—access to an extra hour performance at the 2021 festival, one free ticket to any Ultra Worldwide or Resistance 2021 event, discount code for 50% off up to $250 in Ultra's merchandise, exclusive access to a Premium GA ticket sale at $99.95 each, exclusive access to purchase 2 additional GA tickets to the 2021 festival priced at $249.95 each and a chance at one of 10 Ultra golden tickets where each admits you plus one guest entrance to any Ultra Worldwide events for life. Purchasers were also notified that they would be able to choose whether they'd like to attend Ultra Miami 2021 or 2022 in place of their 2020 ticket. The decision not to refund tickets is following the official refund policy, as the organizers have the option to issue partial or full refunds, postpone the event to a future date, or offer the purchasers a comparable good or service.

On January 21, 2021, it was reported by Billboard that Ultra 2021 will likely be canceled due to the COVID-19 pandemic. Obtaining a letter from an attorney stating that Ultra "anticipate[s] that the City will again invoke the Force Majeure clause", and requesting approval from the City of Miami for the event to be moved to March 25–27, 2022. A month later, on February 21, the cancellation was confirmed.

=== 2022 ===
After the move to Virginia Key in 2019 and cancellations due to the COVID-19 pandemic in 2020 and 2021, Ultra Music Festival returned to the Bayfront Park location for the 2022 edition on March 25, 26 and 27, 2022. The Phase 1 lineup for the festival was revealed on October 26, 2021, featuring Kygo, Martin Garrix, Nina Kraviz, and Gareth Emery among others. Phase 2 of the lineup was revealed on November 17, adding Afrojack (ft. MC Ambush), Armin van Buuren, Tiesto and others, with the final lineup revealed on February 1, 2022.

Hardwell returned as a surprise closing act following a multi-year hiatus from activity, debuting a new techno-influenced style, and subsequently announcing the new album Rebels Never Die and an upcoming world tour.

In May 2022, Ultra announced that it had renewed its lease of Bayfront Park through 2027.

=== 2023 ===
The 2023 edition was scheduled for March 24-26, 2023; Swedish House Mafia was announced as a headliner at the conclusion of the 2022 festival, while a phase 1 lineup featuring headlining performers such as Armin van Buuren, Carl Cox, Claude VonStroke, CloZee, deadmau5 and Kaskade (kx5), Eric Prydz, Grimes, Gryffin, Hardwell, Martin Garrix, Rezz, testpilot and Hi-Lo, and Zedd,

=== 2024 ===
==== Day 1 suspended due to severe weather ====
Heavy rains and wind occurred at Bayfront Park around 8 pm on March 22, Day 1 of the Ultra Music Festival. The severe weather conditions directly interrupted Tiesto's set due to water damage to his mixer. Around 9 pm, all performances were temporarily suspended due to lightning and strong winds, impacting Hardwell, Fisher & Chris Lake Presented Under Construction, Armin van Buuren, etc. Ultra officially suspended all shows for the rest of the day around 10:30 pm. It marks the first time in history that Ultra Music Festival has to be entirely shut down due to severe weather. The last time the festival was impacted by weather was in 2015 when the organizer shut down more than half of the stages.

==== Show resumed, hours extended ====
The show resumed not until the next day at 4 pm, with some sets being rescheduled, including Hardwell.

The show hours were extended on Day 2 from 12 am to 1 am, and Day 3 from 10 pm to 10:30 pm.

=== 2026 ===
The 2026 edition took place from March 27–29, 2026, at Bayfront Park. The phase 1 lineup was unveiled in October 2025, revealing headliners such as Amelie Lens and Sara Landry, Boris Brejcha, Eric Prydz, John Summit, Major Lazer, Miss Monique, DJ Snake, and Vintage Culture, 14 debuting acts, as well as stage takeovers commemorating the anniversaries of Dim Mak Records (30 years) A State of Trance (25 years) and hardstyle label Dirty Workz (20 years).

As part of Mission: Home, the Resistance Cove stage utilized Showpower's SmartGrid battery system for power generation, making it the first major U.S. music festival to deploy the technology.

== Attendances ==
Year	Attendance	Location
1999	10,000	South Beach, Miami Beach
2000	10,000	South Beach, Miami Beach
2001	21,000	Bayfront Park, Downtown Miami
2002	21,500	Bayfront Park, Downtown Miami
2003	25,000	Bayfront Park, Downtown Miami
2004	35,000	Bayfront Park, Downtown Miami
2005	48,000	Bayfront Park, Downtown Miami
2006	48,000	Bicentennial Park, Downtown Miami
2007	50,000	Bicentennial Park, Downtown Miami
2008	70,000	Bicentennial Park, Downtown Miami
2009	85,000	Bicentennial Park, Downtown Miami
2010	93,000	Bicentennial Park, Downtown Miami
2011	100,000	Bicentennial Park, Downtown Miami
2012	165,000	Bayfront Park, Downtown Miami
2013*	330,000	Bayfront Park, Downtown Miami
2014	165,000	Bayfront Park, Downtown Miami
2015	165,000	Bayfront Park, Downtown Miami
2016	165,000	Bayfront Park, Downtown Miami
2017	165,000	Bayfront Park, Downtown Miami
2018	165,000	Bayfront Park, Downtown Miami
2019	170,000	Virginia Key, Miami
2020	N/A	Cancelled due to the COVID-19 pandemic
2021	N/A	Cancelled due to the COVID-19 pandemic
2022	165,000	Bayfront Park, Downtown Miami
2023	165,000	Bayfront Park, Downtown Miami
2024	165,000	Bayfront Park, Downtown Miami
2025	165,000	Bayfront Park, Downtown Miami
2026	165,000	Bayfront Park, Downtown Miami

Attendance figures depict total attendance over the length of the festival.

*2013 attendance include 6 days instead of 3.

== Transportation and hotels ==
Public transportation is generally used by attendees—including the Miami Metrorail, Metromover (which provides free service through Downtown Miami and Brickell), and Metrobus services—to reach the festival grounds due to the cost and scarcity of downtown parking. In 2016, the city began to extend Metrorail and Metromover service to 2:00 a.m. during the festival for the benefit of attendees. Due to their proximity to Bayfront (with some within walking distance), hotels within Greater Downtown Miami such as the Arts & Entertainment District, Brickell, and Edgewater neighborhoods are frequently booked by attendees. South Beach has also been used as an alternative location by some attendees, but traffic congestion is common in and around Miami during the festival.

During the 2019 festival at Virginia Key, concerns were voiced by another community connected via the causeway, Key Biscayne, Florida, over the possibility that the festival could cause traffic congestion on the Rickenbacker Causeway—the sole vehicular link between it and the mainland. There was no public parking at the festival site, and the festival announced plans to offer shuttle service to and from Virginia Key.

== Ultra Worldwide ==
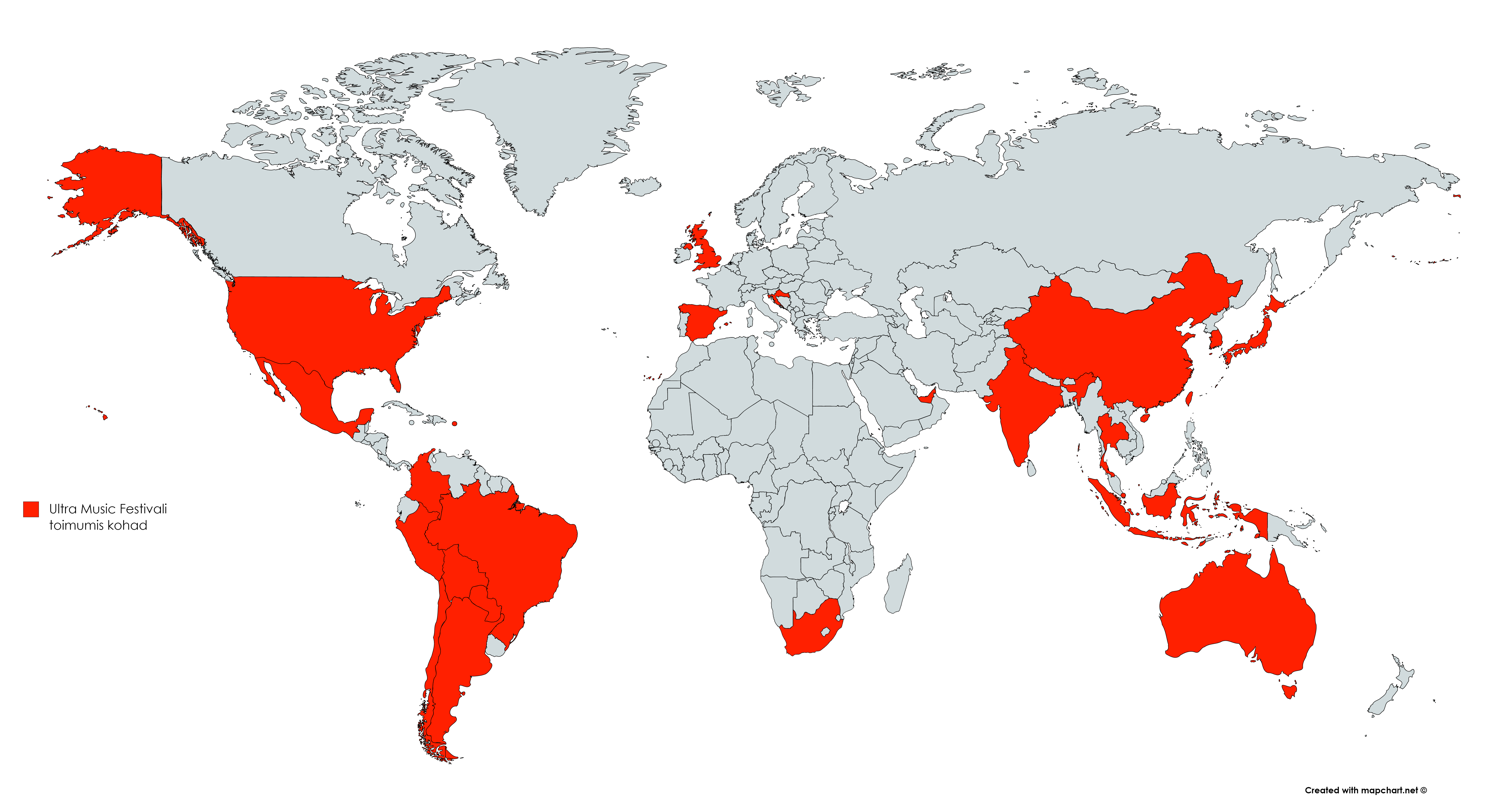
Map showing countries which host an Ultra Music Festival as of 2018

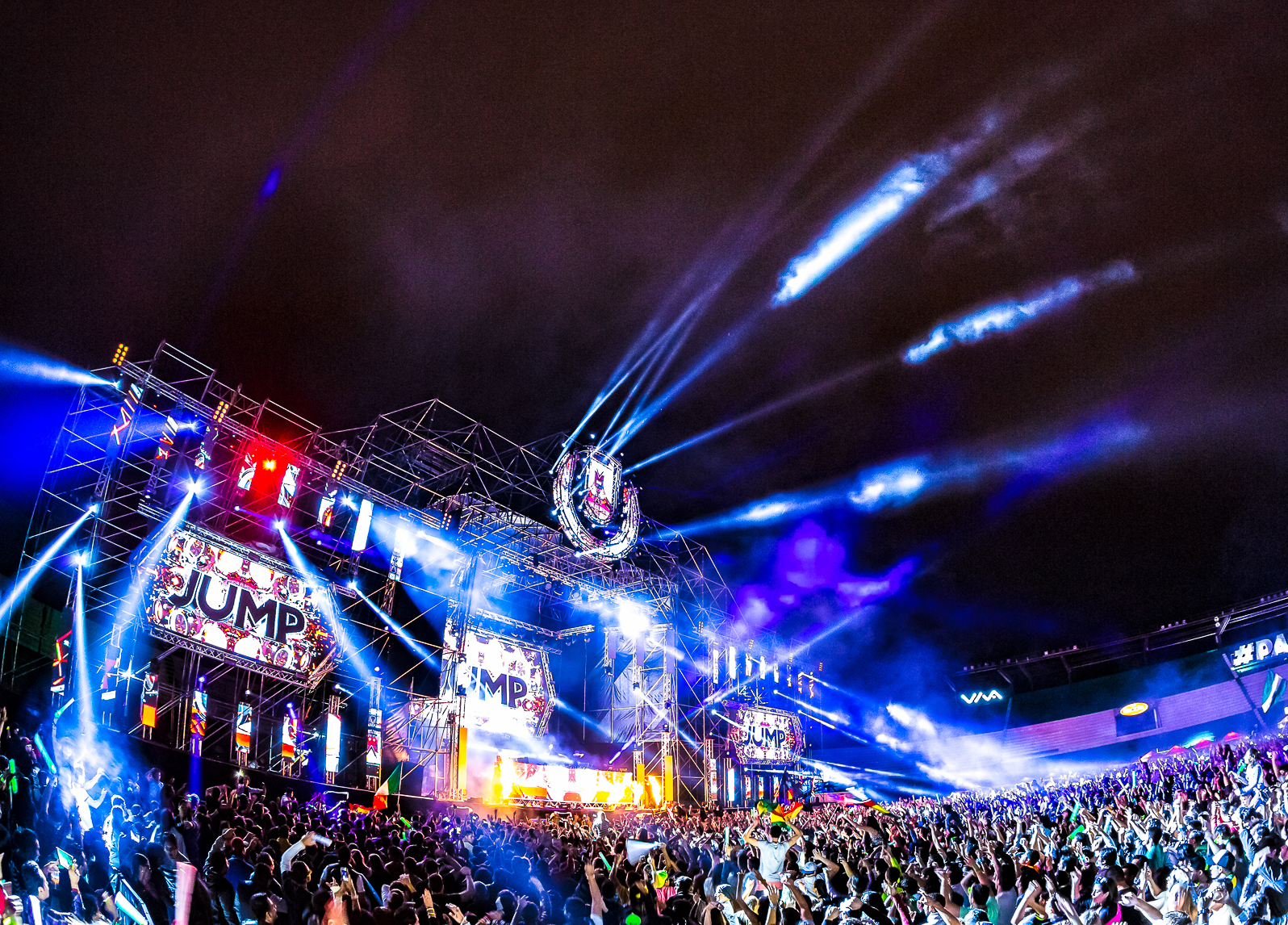
A "Road to Ultra" music festival in Santa Cruz de la Sierra, Bolivia

In 2008, Ultra began Ultra Worldwide — starting with Ultra Brasil, which took place in São Paulo, Brasil, now moving to Rio de Janeiro in 2016. Since then, Ultra has debuted worldwide festivals in Buenos Aires, Argentina (Ultra Buenos Aires); Santiago, Chile (Ultra Chile); Seoul, Korea (Ultra Korea); Johannesburg and Cape Town, South Africa (Ultra South Africa); Tokyo, Japan (Ultra Japan); Abu Dhabi; Bali, Indonesia (Ultra Bali); Singapore (Ultra Singapore); and Ibiza, Spain (Ultra Ibiza). In July 2013, Ultra Worldwide debuted Ultra Europe, also known as Destination Ultra, which takes place across the span of a week throughout different venues across Croatia.

2012 began the event concept entitled Road to Ultra, which are single-day, single-stage events. Road to Ultra events have taken place in Thailand, Korea, Japan, Taiwan, Colombia, Paraguay, Puerto Rico, Macau, Chile, Bolivia, and Peru. In 2016, Road to Ultra took place in Hong Kong for the first time, at the West Kowloon Cultural District.

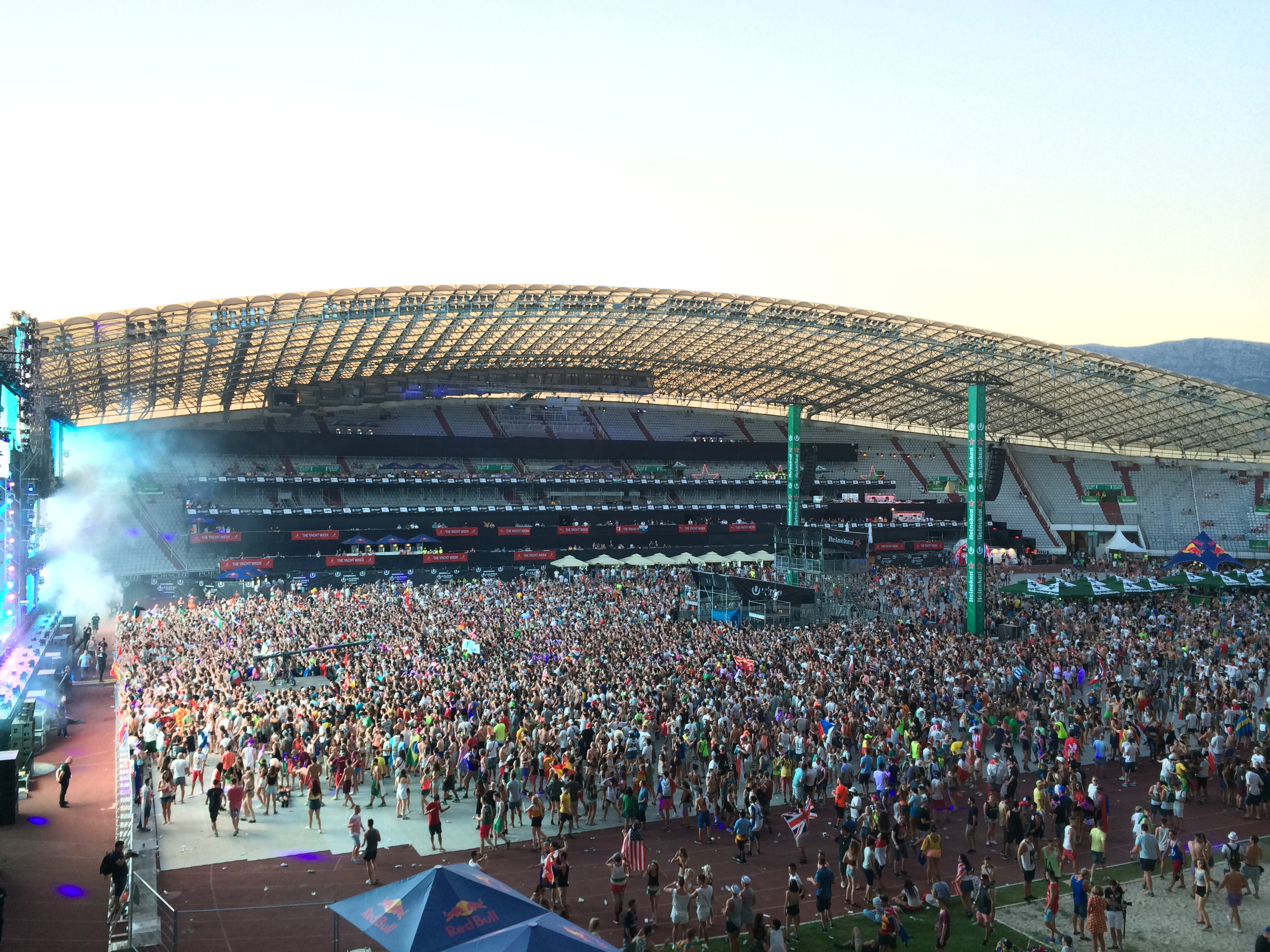
Ultra Europe on Poljud Stadium, in Split, Croatia

During the 2017 edition of Ultra Miami, it was announced that India and Australia would host Road to Ultra events starting in 2017. Also included in the announcement was an expansion to Shanghai with Ultra China, a two-day festival taking place at Shanghai, China, taking place September 9–10, 2017. In late May, it was announced that Ultra Mexico would take place in Mexico City at the Foro Pegaso from October 6–7, 2017.

In 2017, Ultra also began to expand the Resistance brand into its own event series, beginning with an 11-date international tour headlined by Sasha and John Digweed in 2017, along with an eight-week, Tuesday residence at Privilege Ibiza. In February 2018, it was announced that a three-day Resistance Mexico City festival would be held from May 25–27, 2018.

In India, Road to Ultra: India first took take place in New Delhi and Mumbai during September 2017. As for Australia, Road to Ultra: Australia took place in Melbourne in February 2018. It was later announced that a second event in Sydney would be added for 2019. In March 2020, Road To Ultra: India returned, but was held days before the pandemic began.

In November 2020, Road to Ultra: Taiwan marked Ultra's first large-scale event since the emergence of the COVID-19 pandemic.

== Awards and nominations ==
=== DJ Awards ===
Year	Category	Work	Result	Ref.
2007	Best International Dance Music Festival	Ultra Music Festival (Miami)	Nominated	
2008	Special Award - Best International Dance Music Festival	Ultra Music Festival (Miami)	Won	
2018	Special Award - Ibiza Night	RESISTANCE (Ibiza)	Won	

=== DJ Magazine ===
Year	Category	Work	Result	Ref.
2016	Top 100 Festivals	Ultra Music Festival - Miami, Florida	Won	
2017	Top 100 Festivals	Ultra Music Festival - Miami, Florida	Won	
2018	Top 100 Festivals	Ultra Music Festival - Miami, Florida	Not Held	
2019	Top 100 Festivals	Ultra Music Festival - Miami, Florida	3rd	
2020	Top 100 Festivals	Ultra Music Festival - Miami, Florida	Poll Opened, Result Not Published	
2021	Top 100 Festivals	Ultra Music Festival - Miami, Florida	Not Held Due to COVID-19	
2022	Top 100 Festivals	Ultra Music Festival - Miami, Florida	2nd	
2023	Top 100 Festivals	Ultra Music Festival - Miami, Florida	2nd	
2024	Top 100 Festivals	Ultra Music Festival - Miami, Florida	4th	
2025	Top 100 Festivals	Ultra Music Festival - Miami, Florida	2nd	

=== Festicket Awards ===
Year	Category	Work	Result	Ref.
2016	Best EDM/Dance Festival	Ultra Music Festival	2nd	

=== International Dance Music Awards ===
==== Pre–2016 ====
Year	Category	Work	Result	Ref.
2005 (Note: 2005 saw the introduction of the category "Best Dance Event".)	Best Dance Event	Ultra Music Festival - Miami, Florida	Nominated	
2006	Best Dance Event	Ultra Music Festival - Miami, Florida	Nominated	
2007	Best Dance Event	Ultra Music Festival - Miami, Florida	Nominated	
2008 (Note: In 2008, the category of "Best Dance Event" was renamed to "Best Music Event".)	Best Music Event	Ultra Music Festival - Miami, Florida	Won	
2009	Best Music Event	Ultra Music Festival - Miami, Florida	Won	
2010	Best Music Event	Ultra Music Festival - Miami, Florida	Won	
2011	Best Music Event	Ultra Music Festival - Miami, Florida	Won	
2012	Best Music Event	Ultra Music Festival - Miami, Florida	Nominated	
2013	Best Music Event	Ultra Music Festival - Miami, Florida	Nominated	
2014	Best Music Event	Ultra Music Festival - Miami, Florida	Nominated	
2015	Best Music Event	Ultra Music Festival - Miami, Florida	Nominated	
2016	Best Music Event	Ultra Music Festival - Miami, Florida	Nominated	

==== 2018–present ====
Note: (Note: No award ceremony was held in 2017. In 2018 winners were chosen by the Winter Music Conference themselves. 2019 marks the first year of public voting since the Winter Music Conference's restructure.)

Year	Category	Work	Result	Ref.
2018	Best Festival	Ultra Music Festival	Won	
2019	Best Festival	Ultra Music Festival	Nominated	
2020	Best Festival	Ultra Music Festival	Nominated	

== See also ==
- List of electronic music festivals
- Divine Playground
- Ultra Australia
- Ultra Bali
- Ultra Buenos Aires
- Ultra China
- Ultra Chile
- Ultra Brasil
- Ultra Europe
- Ultra Korea
- Ultra Japan
- Music of Miami
- Ultra Singapore
- Ultra South Africa
- Road to Ultra
- Russell Faibisch
