= Ultra Brasil =

Electronic music festival in Brazil

- Status: Active
- Genre: Electronic music festival
- Venue: Sambodromo
- Locations: Rio de Janeiro, Brazil
- Years active: 2008 (Sao Paulo); 2010-2011 (Sao Paulo); 2016-2018 (Rio de Janeiro) 2023 (Sao Paulo)
- Organizer: Ultra Worldwide
- Website: ultrabrasil.com

Ultra Brasil is an outdoor electronic music festival that is a part of Ultra Music Festival's worldwide expansion, which has now spread to twenty countries. Ultra Brasil debuted in November 2008 in São Paulo and Belo Horizonte, Brazil. In 2016, Ultra Brasil took place at the Sambodromo in Rio de Janeiro, Brasil during 14–15 October 2016. The 2017 edition of Ultra Brasil has been announced to take place at the Sambodromo in Rio de Janeiro during 12–14 October 2017.

== History ==
=== 2008 ===
The inaugural edition of Ultra Brasil took place in two locations—Belo Horizonte and São Paulo, Brasil during 1–2 November 2008. Approximately 17,500 fans attended Ultra's first worldwide event in Brasil. The event in Belo Horizonte took place at the Centro De Convençoes Risoleta Neves and lasted for over twelve hours, from day to night. The event in São Paulo took place at the Anzu Club, and lasted for about twenty-three hours, from night to day. Ultra Brasil 2008 featured the likes of Carl Cox, Erick Morillo, Booka Shade, Fedde Le Grand, Benny Benassi, Victor Calderone, Yves Larock, Tocadisco, Crossover, and Brazilian artists like Ferris, Leo Janiero, Rodrigo Vieira, Marcos Carnaval, and Luca Di Napoli.

=== 2010 ===
Ultra Brasil returned to São Paulo, Brasil on 6 November 2010 and took place at the Chácara do Jockey, and approximately 20,000 people were in attendance for Ultra's second event in Brasil. The event consisted of four stages—Main Stage, Carl Cox & Friends, We Love Brasil Stage, and the Tenda the Week Stage. The event featured exclusive performances from Fatboy Slim, Moby, and Carl Cox. Other artists on the bill for the festival included Above & Beyond, Groove Armada, Kaskade, Grum, Gui Boratto, Afrobeta, Marky, Lovefoxxx, Kings of Swingers and Stop Play Moon, Renato Ratier, Fedde Le Grand, Faithless, Yousef, and Anderson Noise.

=== 2011 ===
The following edition of Ultra Brasil took place on 3 December 2011 at the Sambódromo Anhembi in São Paulo, Brasil. The event featured two stages—Main Stage and the Arena. About 30,000 people attended the third edition of Ultra Brasil. Artists on the lineup included Swedish House Mafia, New Order, Duck Sauce, 2manyDJs, Death From Above 1979, Laidback Luke, Alesso, Shit Robot, MSTRKRFT, Major Lazer, Nero, Diplo, Renato Ratier, the Twelves, DJ Marky, and more.

=== 2016 ===
After four years, Ultra Brasil returned, taking place in Rio de Janeiro, Brasil during 14–15 October 2016 at the Sambodromo. Exclusive pre-sale tickets for Ultra Brasil went on sale in April, and the following tier of tickets went on sale in early May. The phase one lineup for Ultra Brasil was announced on 20 July 2016 and included the likes of Carl Cox, Dash Berlin, Hardwell, Martin Garrix, DJ Snake, ANNA, Heatbeat, Hot Since 82, Jauz, and Matador. The phase one lineup announcement also that Ultra Brasil would have a Resistance/Carl Cox & Friends Stage. The phase two lineup for Ultra Brasil was announced on 23 August 2016 and included the likes of Above & Beyond, Krewella (live), Nic Fanciulli, Steve Aoki, Art Department, Carnage, Cosmic Gate, Infected Mushroom, Markus Schulz, Steve Lawler, Nicole Moudaber, and many more. The final lineup for Ultra Brasil was announced on 12 September 2016 and featured additional artists including Felguk, Jon Rundell, Liquid Soul, Rodrigo Vieira, Vini Vici, and many other local and regional artists. It was also announced that Ultra Brasil and MTV worked together to broadcast the festival to fans across Latin America. Ultra Brasil sold out its allotted number of tickets on 14 October 2016. Over 60,000 fans swarmed to the north of the city for what turned out to be one of the undisputed highlights of Ultra Worldwide’s 2016 calendar.

=== 2017 ===
On 19 January 2017, it was announced that Ultra Brasil would return to the Sambodromo in Rio de Janeiro for an extended three days during 12–14 October 2017. Early bird tickets for this second edition went on sale 27 January 2017 and sold out a few days after. Tier 1 tickets for Ultra Brasil 2017 went on sale 21 February 2017. During Ultra Music Festival's 19th edition, it was revealed that Armin van Buuren would be one of the artists performing at Ultra Brasil. Egyptian trance duo, Aly & Fila has also been announced to play the festival.

=== 2023 ===
On April 22, 23, Ultra Brasil was held at Vale do Anhangabaú, in central Sao Paulo.

== See also ==
- List of electronic dance music festivals
- Ultra Music Festival
- Russell Faibisch
- Ultra Buenos Aires
- Ultra Japan
- Ultra Korea
- Ultra Chile
- Ultra Singapore
- Ultra South Africa
- Ultra Europe
- Ultra Bali
- Road to Ultra
- Ultra China
- Ultra México
