= Alex Omes =

American nightlife impresario and concert promoter (1971–2015)

Alejandro "Alex" Omes (c. 1971 – January 12, 2015) was an Argentine-born American nightlife impresario and concert promoter. In 1999, Omes and Russell Faibisch, his then-business partner, co-founded the Ultra Music Festival, an outdoor electronic music festival held annually in Miami, Florida. Since its founding, Ultra Music Festival has grown into one of the country's and the world's largest electronic dance music festivals. An estimated 400,000 people attended Ultra Music Festival over the course of two weekends in 2013, the highest number of attendees to date.

== Early life and education ==
Omes was born and raised in Argentina. He moved to Miami Beach, Florida, when he was 9 years old with his mother and brother, Carlos Omes. Alex Omes graduated from Miami Beach Senior High School.

== Career ==
He began his career within Miami's club and electronic music scenes as a bouncer at the Cameo nightclub in Miami Beach during the 1990s. He then became a publisher of an electronic and dance music magazine called D'VOX, which focused on Miami's emerging electronic dance music industry during the 1990s. Omes acquired professional contacts within the city's music and DJ culture while working at D'VOX and the nightclubs.

One of Omes's contacts within the music industry was Russell Faibisch, with whom he conceived the idea for a beachfront music festival that would become Ultra. The two met at an event. In a 2013 interview with Miami New Times, Faibisch recalled, "I was doing an event and had to place some ads...That's when I met Alex Omes, who had the vision. We started Ultra together." Omes and Faibisch, who had similar interests in club music, soon became close friends and, later, business partners. Together, they brainstormed the idea for a beachfront music festival to be held alongside the annual Winter Music Conference (WMC). Thousands of attendees and electronic music fans had attended WMC annually since its creation in 1985. The two business partners saw potential for a dance music event during the same week as WMC.

Faibisch and Omes organized the first Ultra Music Festival on March 13, 1999, in Collins Park in Miami Beach's South Beach neighborhood. Artists performing at the first Ultra's main stage included Paul van Dyk, DJ Baby Anne and Josh Wink. The 1999 Ultra festival proved popular, with 10,000 concertgoers in attendance, though Omes and Faibisch still saw a financial loss of between $10,000 and $20,000 on the project during its first year.

Ultra Music Festival was held as a one-day event from 1999 until 2006. It was expanded into a two-day festival from 2007 to 2010, eventually reaching across two consecutive weekends in 2013. Ultra Music Festival reverted to a three-day concert in 2014. The event has featured some of the world's top electronic and dance DJs and artists, including Avicii, DJ Eddie G Miami, Deadmau5, Tiësto, Paul van Dyk, and Madonna.

Omes was pushed out of Ultra on August 10, 2010 after Ultra Music Festival officials ended its decade-long association with the Winter Music Conference. Omes charged that he had been forced out of Ultra following a "secret shareholders' meeting" in a lawsuit filed in 2012.

Alex Omes soon partnered with another Miami nightlife promoter, Emi Guerra. Together, Omes and Guerra co-founded Go Big Productions, an event company, to stage concerts and other major events in Miami. In 2011 and 2012, Go Big Productions held concerts featuring Swedish House Mafia on the same weekends as the Ultra Music Festival. Go Big also planned a new two-day, multistage concert, called the UR1 music festival, which was scheduled to be held in downtown Miami in 2012, coinciding with Art Basel. However, UR1, which would have featured Kanye West and Lou Reed as headliners, was cancelled due to lower than expected ticket sales.

== Lawsuit and death ==
In August 2012, Omes filed a $33 million lawsuit against Faibisch and two other Ultra Music Festival executives, Charlie Faibisch and Adam Russakoff, alleging that they had conspired to oust him from "the now financially successful event" (Ultra) following a "secret shareholders' meeting. The lawsuit alleged that the three knew that Omes would never agree to break off an existing affiliation with the Winter Music Conference.

A two-week trial for the lawsuit began on Tuesday, January 13, 2015, in Miami. However, Alex Omes never arrived for that day's court proceedings. Omes's brother, Carlos, and his attorney, Aaron Resnick, became concerned when Omes didn't show up for the opening arguments on Tuesday morning. They discovered Alex Omes dead at his home at the age of 43. Omes had died on Monday night, January 12, 2015, according to a report from the Miami-Dade County Medical Examiner. His cause of death was released by the medical examiner on March 9, 2016, saying that Omes had amphetamines, ketamine, cocaine and GHB in his system when he died and cocaine was found in his apartment. Omes was survived by his son, Joshua Omes, and former wife, Karie Omes. His funeral was held at St. Patrick Catholic Church in Miami Beach on January 23, 2015.
