= Ultra Buenos Aires =

- Status: Active
- Genre: Electronic music festival
- Locations: Buenos Aires, Argentina
- Years active: 2012–2015, 2025– (Buenos Aires)
- Organizer: Ultra Worldwide
- Website: ultrabuenosaires.com

Ultra Buenos Aires is an outdoor electronic music festival that is a part of Ultra Music Festival's worldwide expansion, which has now spread to twenty countries. The inaugural edition of Ultra Buenos Aires took place at the Costanera Sur in Buenos Aires, Argentina on 5 May 2012.

The festival will return in April 2025, ten years after its last edition.

== History ==
=== 2012 ===
The debut of Ultra Buenos Aires was a one-day event held at the Costanera Sur in Buenos Aires, Argentina on 5 May 2012. The one-day event consisted of three stages—Main Stage, Trance Stage, and the DJ Mag Stage. The first edition of Ultra Buenos Aires featured the likes of Kyau & Albert, Justice, Kaskade, John Digweed, Heatbeat, Shogun, TyDi, Andy Moor, Sean Tyas, Christopher Lawrence, Modeselektor, Ida Engberg, Matthew Dekay, Len Faki, Stephan Bodzin, and Chris Liebing. The festival was broadcast live on UMF TV via YouTube.

=== 2013 ===
The second edition of Ultra Buenos Aires took place across the span of two days at the Costanera Sur in Puerto Madero once again, on 19 February and 23 February 2013. The first day of the festival only had one stage, the Main Stage, which included the likes of Tomas Heredia, Festa Bros, Martin Solveig, Avicii, Hardwell, and Dash Berlin. Day two of the festival, featured three stages—Main Stage, Carl Cox & Friends Arena, and the Armada Stage. Featured artists for the second day of Ultra Buenos Aires were Mika, Knife Party, Sander van Doorn, Armin van Buuren, Afrojack, Nina Kraviz, Dasha Rush, UMEK, Jeff Mills, Marco Carola, Omnia, Tenishia, Aly & Fila, and many more. Over 40,000 people were in attendance for the second year of Ultra Buenos Aires.

=== 2014 ===
The third edition of Ultra Buenos Aires took place at the Ciudad del Rock in Buenos Aires, Argentina. The festival lasted two consecutive days, taking place from 21–22 February 2014. The first day of the festival, 21 February, featured solely the Main Stage and included artists such as Hercules & Love Affair, Showtek, Steve Aoki, Nicky Romero, Paul van Dyk, and many more. The following day included four stages—the Main Stage, the Be Techno Stage, the Full On Stage with Ferry Corsten, and the DJ Mag Latinoamerica Stage. The second day of Ultra Buenos Aires, 22 February, included Adrian Lux, Sunnery James & Ryan Marciano, Pendulum, Tiesto, Pig & Dan, Nicole Moudaber, Green Velvet, Ben Klock, Super8 & Tab, John O'Callaghan, John Digweed, Guy J, Sebastian Mullaert, and many more. The third year of Ultra Buenos Aires welcomed 70,000 people in attendance.

=== 2015 ===
The following edition of Ultra Buenos Aires took place once again at the Ciudad del Rock in Buenos Aires, Argentina and lasted from 20–21 February 2015. The festival consisted of four stages—Main Stage, Resistance/Drumcode Stage, UMF Radio/DJ Mag Latinoamerica Stage, and the Make the Beat Stage that was only accessible to attendees during the second day of the festival. The third year of Ultra Buenos Aires included the likes of Knife Party, Afrojack, Porter Robinson, New World Punx, Alesso, Dash Berlin, Showtek, Firebeatz, Marco Carola, Modeselektor, Adam Beyer, Alan Fitzpatrick, Harvey McKay, Alex M.O.R.P.H., Blond:ish, Angerfist, Coone, and more.

=== 2025 ===
The festival will return in 18-19 April 2025, and will be held at Parque de la Ciudad in Buenos Aires.

== See also ==
- List of electronic dance music festivals
- Ultra Music Festival
- Russell Faibisch
- Ultra Brasil
- Ultra Chile
- Ultra Japan
- Ultra Korea
- Ultra Singapore
- Ultra South Africa
- Ultra Europe
- Ultra Bali
- Road to Ultra
