= Ultra Japan =

Electronic music festival in Tokyo, Japan

- Genre: Electronic dance music
- Date: Mid- to late- September
- Frequency: Annually
- Locations: Tokyo, Japan
- Years active: 12 years
- Inaugurated: September 27, 2014
- Most recent: September 13–14, 2025
- Attendance: 100,000 (2018)
- Organizer: Ultra Japan Executive Committee (Ultra Enterprises Inc. and Avex Inc.)
- Website: ultrajapan.com

Ultra Japan is an outdoor electronic music festival that is a part of Ultra Music Festival's worldwide expansion, which has now spread to twenty countries. Ultra Japan made its debut as a two-day festival during September 27–28, 2014, and took place at the Tokyo Odaiba Ultra Park in Tokyo, Japan.

== History ==
=== 2014 ===
The inaugural edition of Ultra Japan took place at the Tokyo Odaiba Ultra Park and featured three stages—the Main Stage, Ultra Worldwide Arena, and the UMF Radio Stage. The lineup included the likes of Morgan Page, W&W, Martin Garrix, Steve Angello, Hardwell, Sunnery James & Ryan Marciano, Fedde Le Grand, Afrojack, Axwell & Ingrosso, Pig & Dan, Kaskade, UMEK, Gina Turner, Mark Knight, Brass Knuckles, Darren Emerson, and many more. Ultra Japan's first edition drew an attendance of over 42,000 people.

=== 2015 ===
For the following year, Ultra Japan expanded into a three-day festival and was once again held at Tokyo's Odaiba Ultra Park during the weekend of September 19–21, 2015. This edition included the same stages from the year before; Main Stage, Ultra Worldwide Arena, and UMF Radio Stage, but introduced the Resistance Stage for the final two days; which debuted at Ultra Music Festival earlier that year. Artists on the lineup included Dash Berlin, Justin Oh, Robin Schulz, David Guetta, DJ Snake, Afrojack, Mija, Carnage, Skrillex, Ksuke, Zeds Dead, Alesso, Pendulum, Chase and Status, Nic Fanciulli, John Digweed, Gorgon City, Sasha, and many more. Approximately 90,000 people were in attendance at Ultra Japan's second edition.

=== 2016 ===
2016 marked Ultra Japan's third year taking place at the Tokyo Odaiba Ultra Park. The festival took place during the weekend of September 17–19, 2016 and it was confirmed via the Phase 1 lineup that deadmau5, Hardwell, Martin Garrix, Nero, DJ Snake, Jauz, and Marshmello were the first announced to play the three-day festival. Ultra Japan is strictly a festival for those twenty years old and over. The third edition of Ultra Japan also had a Resistance stage for its second year in a row. The lineup for the Resistance stage included Dubfire, Art Department, Nic Fanciulli, Matador, Nicole Moudaber, Technasia, Yotto, Takkyu Ishino and many more. The Phase 2 lineup for Ultra Japan was released on August 3, 2016, and included Knife Party, Kygo, Tiesto, Zhu, Galantis, Gryffin, Shogun, Thomas Jack, W&W, Yotto, Carnage, Fedde Le Grand, and more. The festival featured three stages—Mainstage, Live Stage, and the Resistance stage. The 2016 edition of Ultra Japan welcomed 120,000 people in attendance to the Tokyo Odaiba Ultra Park.

=== 2017 ===
The festival, which took place from September 16–18, saw performances by Alesso, Carl Cox, Hardwell, Kygo, KSHMR (live), SHRKTOPS, Steve Aoki, The Chainsmokers and Tiesto.

=== 2022 ===
The 2022 edition of Ultra Japan took place on September 17 and 18. It will see performances from the likes of Afrojack, KSHMR, Martin Garrix, Nicky Romero and Zedd among others.

External videos
- A cinéma vérité view of participants in 2017

== See also ==
- List of electronic dance music festivals
- Ultra Music Festival
- Russell Faibisch
- Ultra Australia
- Ultra Brasil
- Ultra Buenos Aires
- Road to Ultra
- Ultra Korea
- Ultra Chile
- Ultra Bali
- Ultra Singapore
- Ultra South Africa
- Ultra Europe
