= Divine Playground =

Divine Playground was an American multi-genre music festival with rave-style production that took place on March 20, 1993, at Bay Front Park in Miami, Florida, six years before Ultra Music Festival was held at the same location. The event was created by Los Angeles promoter Philip Blaine, Detroit promoters Vince Bannon & Amir Daiza, and Miami promoter Geoff Gordon. The featured performing artists were a blend of hip hop and early rave acts. Tickets were sold for $17.50.

The show was the first of a new “rave” tour that Rage Against the Machine co-headlined on March 20 at Bayfront Park Amphitheatre in Miami.

Divine Playground featured a zero-gravity machine, a `moon-bounce house` and virtual reality gear. Giant video screens, enhanced with effects, enabled dancers to see themselves in action.

== Featured artists and DJs ==
- House Of Pain
- 808 State
- Stereo MC's
- Utah Saints
- Wool
- Rage Against The Machine
- Super DJ Dmitry
- Sven Vath
- Keoki
- Derrick "May Day" May
- Meat Beat Manifesto

=== Sub-headliner DJs ===
Additional DJs supporting the event: DJ Icee, Carlos Espinosa, Drena DeNiro, Techman 1, Robbie Clark, DB, Jason Bentley

== Precursor to Ultra Music Festival ==
The event took place at Bay Front Park, where Ultra Music Festival now takes place.

DJ Scotto, who also performed at the event, recalls: [Divine Playground was] the 1st festival encompassing EDM and dj/dance culture in the region, long before ULTRA.

User "illuminaughty" recalls the experience on clubplanet.com: "This event was totally ahead of its time and its events like this that paved the way to what we now know as ULTRA. Considering back in that time, electronic music and culture was very underground, and parties (raves) were held throughout Miami and Fort Lauderdale mostly in illegal warehouses."
