= Ultra South Africa =

Electronic music festival

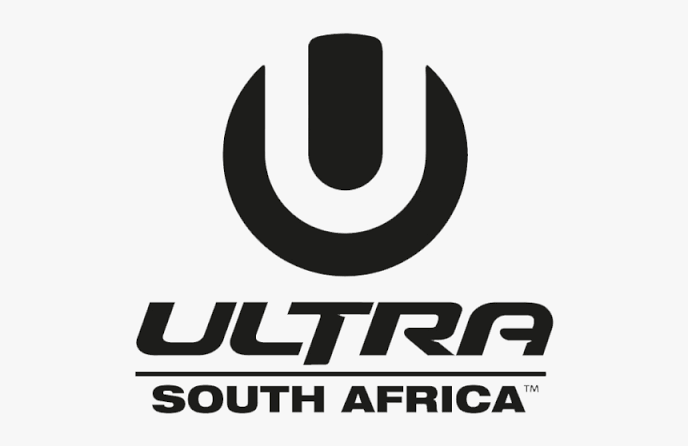
- Genre: Electronic dance music
- Date: February/ March
- Frequency: Annually
- Locations: Cape Town, South Africa; Johannesburg, South Africa
- Years active: 12 years
- Inaugurated: February 14, 2014
- Most recent: 9, 10 May 2025
- Next event: 25, 26 April 2026
- Attendance: 55,000 (2025)
- Website: ultrasouthafrica.com

Ultra South Africa is Africa's largest electronic music festival and is part of Ultra Music Festival's worldwide expansion which has now spread to twenty countries. Ultra South Africa is a single day event taking place in two cities (Johannesburg and Cape Town). Having debuted in 2014, Ultra South Africa is the third longest standing world editions of the festival behind Ultra Europe and Ultra Korea. Ultra South Africa is a strictly 18 and over event.

== History ==
=== 2014 ===
The debut of Ultra South Africa consisted of three stages in both Johannesburg and Cape Town—the Main Stage, Stage 2, and Stage 3. In Cape Town, South Africa the festival took place on 14 February 2014 and in Johannesburg, the festival took place on 15 February 2014. Confirmed artists for the inaugural edition of Ultra South Africa included Tiesto, Afrojack, Alesso, Nicky Romero, Krewella, W&W, Martin Garrix, Blasterjaxx, Claude Vonstroke, Goldfish, Black Coffee, and many more. The festival welcomed 15,000 people in attendance to Cape Town and an additional 25,000 people to the Johannesburg location.

=== 2015 ===
The second edition of Ultra South Africa was once again held in Johannesburg and Cape Town, South Africa at the same two venues from the year before on 13–14 February 2015. The festival was host to three stages—the Main Stage, the Electric Stage, and the Nicci Beach Stage. Ultra South Africa 2015 included the likes of Protoculture, Oliver Heldens, DVBBS, Martin Garrix, Armin van Buuren, Hardwell, Goldfish, Axwell & Ingrosso, Gorgon City, Black Coffee, and many more. This edition of Ultra South Africa saw more than 50,000 dance music fans from across South Africa and beyond.

=== 2016 ===
Following an incredible second edition, the Ultra South Africa organisers announced that the festival will expand to three days in 2016, 26 & 27 February in Johannesburg and 28 February in Cape Town. In response to demand from fans event organisers confirmed that they will be adding an extra date to the Cape Town leg (27 & 28 February 2016) and that they will also be introducing camping for the first time. Attendees who already purchased early bird tickets in Cape Town were rewarded with a double day pass for the same, previously single day, ticket.

On 21 October 2015, Ultra South Africa announced its phase one lineup which included Zedd, Robin Schulz, Tiesto, Skrillex, Dash Berlin, Galantis, Seth Troxler, The Martinez Brothers and Black Coffee. on 24 November, organisers dropped the final line up with Afrojack, Carnage, Goldfish, Mr Carmack, Claptone, W&W and Fedde Le Grand. 2016's 2-day format entertained more than 26, 000 party goers per day at the NASREC in Johannesburg, and 14, 000 per day at the Ostrich Farm in Cape Town.

=== 2017 ===
It was announced on 27 July 2016 that for Ultra South Africa's fourth edition, the festival would take place on the 24–25 February 2017. In Johannesburg, the festival was held on 25 February 2017 at the Nasrec Expo Centre, once again. In Cape Town, the festival announced a new venue—Cape Town Stadium. The festival in Cape Town took place on 24 February 2017. Early bird tickets went on sale on 2 August 2016 and sold out on 4 August 2016. Tier one tickets were released to the public on 30 August 2016. On 30 August 2016, Martin Garrix and David Guetta were announced as the first headliners for the 2017 edition of the festival. The phase two lineup was announced on 30 November 2016 and included Dash Berlin, KSHMR, DJ Snake, Black Coffee, Felix Jaehn, Djsky, Head Hunters, Nic Fanciulli and many other regional artists.

=== 2018 ===
Ultra South Africa has announced that its fifth anniversary will return to the Cape Town Stadium in Cape Town, South Africa on 9 February 2018 and the Nasrec Expo Centre in Johannesburg, South Africa on 10 February 2018. On September 19, 2017, Phase 1 of the lineup was released and the headliners were revealed to be Armin van Buuren and Hardwell. Phase 2 of the lineup was released on October 24, 2017 and included Afrojack, Axwell Λ Ingrosso, Dubfire, Malaa, Black Coffee and Carnage along with many regional artists. On Friday, February 9, the Cape Town Stadium saw 15,000 fans stream through the gates while the Johannesburg show at the Expo Centre at Nasrec welcomed a record-breaking 32,000 Ultranauts through the gates on Saturday, February 10, for what was the biggest and most successful ULTRA South Africa in Joburg to date.

=== 2019 ===
On 16 August 2018, Ultra South Africa announced the dates for its 6th edition. After two years at the Cape Town stadium, Organisers have decided to return the Cape Town edition to the Ostrich Ranch with the Johannesburg edition continuing its long standing tradition at its historic home at The Nasrec Expo Centre. On 6 November 2018, Ultra South Africa announced for the first time ever that The Chainsmokers will headline the 6th edition of Ultra South Africa. The phase 2 lineup was announced on 3 December 2018, which included Above and Beyond, Martin Garrix, Black Coffee, Vini Vici and Infected Mushroom. This edition marked the biggest Ultra South Africa to date with over 50 000 fans between Cape Town and Johannesburg.

=== 2020 ===
Five months after the wrapping up its biggest Ultra to date, the festival announced the dates for its 7th edition with organisers also promising an expanded production for 2020. In October 2019, Ultra South Africa announced its phase one headliners, which included, Afrojack, Black Coffee, Dash Berlin, DJ Snake as well as Jamie Jones who will be making his South Africa debut and Steve Aoki who will be making his Ultra South Africa debut. Two weeks later, Ultra South Africa announced Camelphat, Luciano and Sunnery James & Ryan Marciano as support.

This edition also marked the biggest Ultra South Africa to date with Ultra SA founders, Shaun Duvet and Tony Feldman commenting

“Ultra South Africa 2020 was, as they always are, the best one we have produced to date". "These shows are such massive projects to pull together and each year when we see it all come together with the incredible teams that join us each year in making this happen, we feel very proud. We cannot wait for 2021 and all the years to come as the shows get bigger and wilder“.

=== 2021 ===
During the Johannesburg leg of if its 7th edition, organisers confirmed that Ultra South Africa will return to Cape Town and Johannesburg for its 8th edition on 26 & 27 February 2021. Unfortunately, due to the COVID-19 pandemic, the organisers announced on 22 January 2021 that the festival will not be taking place in 2021. The eighth edition will now take place on 10 & 11 March 2023, with the Cape Town event heading to a new venue, The Kenilworth Racecourse while the Johannesburg leg will return to its home at the Nasrec Expo Center.

=== 2023 ===
On 21 September 2022, ULTRA South Africa announced its return after a two-year hiatus due to the COVID-19 pandemic. The eighth edition of Ultra South Africa took place on March 10 in Cape Town and March 11, 2023 in Johannesburg. Tickets went on sale on September 24 at 08:00 with both tier 1 and tier 2 GA and VIP selling out within a few hours. The lineup included Oliver Heldens, Goldfish (band), Alesso, Timmy Trumpet, Fisher (musician), Joris Voorn, and Kölsch (artist) amongst other local and regional artists.

=== 2024 ===
On 27 July 2023, organisers announced that Ultra South Africa will return in 2024 and will once again take place in Cape Town and Johannesburg on 1 &2 March 2024 respectively. Artists included Skrillex, as well as Steve Aoki, Afrojack, W&W and Vintage Culture.

=== 2025 ===
Ultra South Africa returned for its sold out 10th anniversary on 9th and 10th May 2025. Headliners included Armin van Buuren, Kshmr, Martin Garrix, Mind Against, Massano, Shimza, Culoe De Song, and others. Cape Town featured two stages, Main and Resistance while the Johannesburg leg included The Groove Room, which paid homage to South African electronic music and Amapiano. Notable performers included Oscar Mbo, Dlala Thukzin, 2woBunnies, and Mörda. Clubhouse returned and featured sets from Kasango, Shamiso, and Mpho.Wav.

=== 2026 ===
The dates for the 11th edition were announced at the culmination of the Johannesburg event.

For the first time, ULTRA South Africa will kick off in Johannesburg on Saturday 25 April 25, at the Expo Centre, Nasrec, and then in Cape Town on Sunday, 26 April 2026 at The Ostrich. Special afterglow tickets were released on 11 May for those who attended the 10th anniversary, with pre-registration open for general sale later this year.

== Attendance ==
Year	Cape Town	Johannesburg	Total
2014	15,000	25,000	40,000
2015	18,000	30,000	48,000
2016	14,000	26,000	40,000 (80,000 over four days)
2017	18,000	30,000	48,000
2018	15,000	32,000	47,000
2019	15,000	35,000	50,000
2020	16,830	34,170	51,000

== See also ==
- Russell Faibisch
- Ultra Brasil
- Ultra Buenos Aires
- Ultra Chile
- Ultra Japan
- Ultra Korea
- Ultra Bali
- Ultra Singapore
- Ultra Europe
- Road to Ultra
