= Ultra Singapore =

- Genre: Electronic dance music
- Dates: Early- to mid- June (since 2017)
- Frequency: Annually
- Location: Marina Bay, Singapore
- Years active: 11 years
- Inaugurated: September 19, 2015
- Most recent: June 8-9, 2019
- Attendance: 41,000 (2018)
- Website: ultrasingapore.com

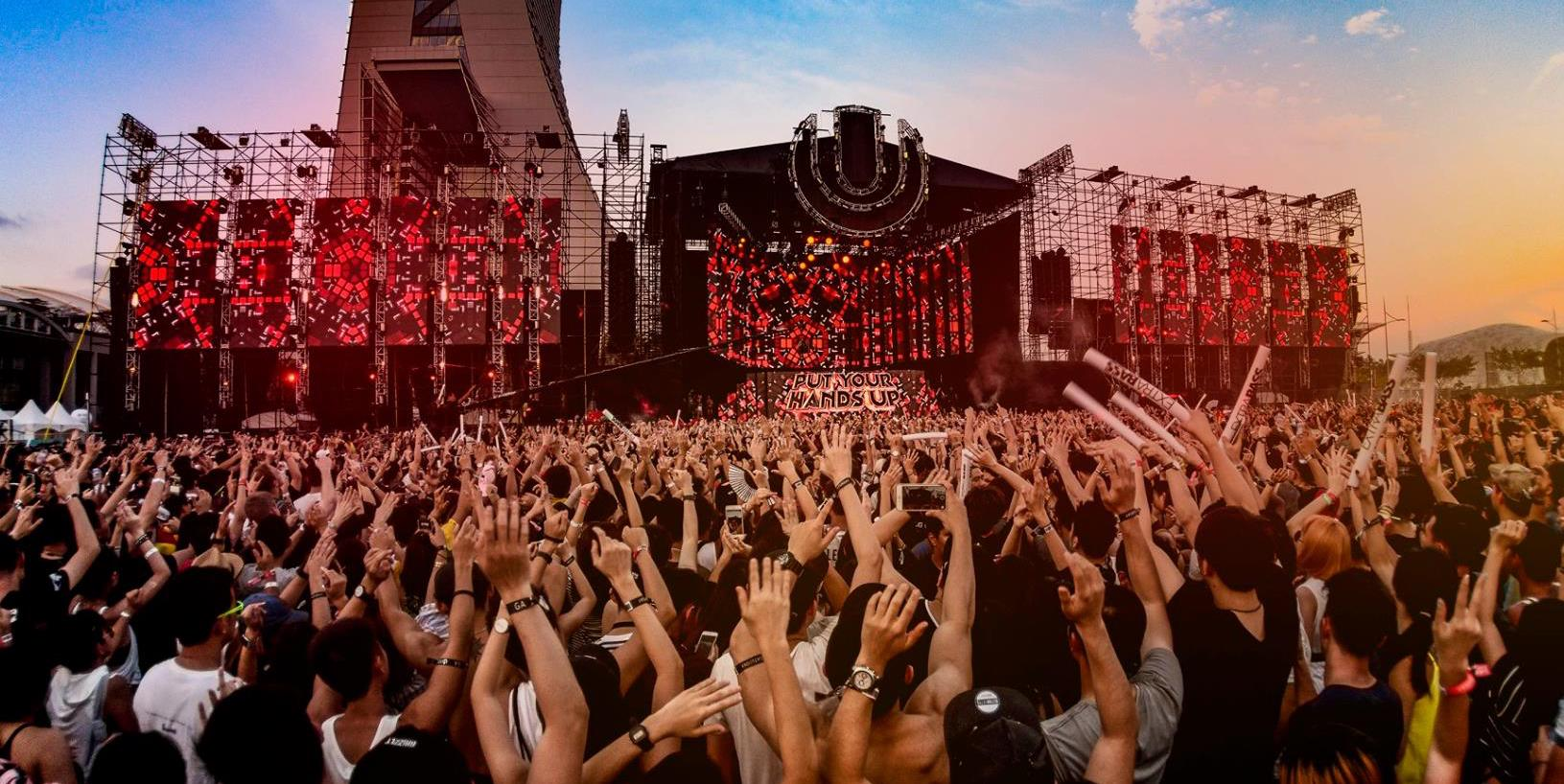
A picture of the Ultra Singapore Stage. Ultra Singapore is an outdoor electronic music festival that debuted in 2015 in Singapore as part of Ultra Music Festival's worldwide expansion, which has now spread to twenty countries.

Ultra Singapore began with a Road to Ultra event in September 2015, and returned in 2016 as a two-day festival, held at Ultra Park, a field across from Marina Bay Sands, on 10–11 September 2016.

== History ==
=== 2015 ===
The Road to Ultra event in Singapore took place on 19 September 2015 at the convention center in the Marina Bay Sands Hotel during the 2015 Formula One race weekend. Early bird tickets for the event sold out in a record-breaking 21 minutes, eventually leading to the selling out of all tickets. Artists on the bill for the RTU event included Skrillex, Alesso, Nicky Romero, Mija, Ansolo, and Rave Republic. The debut of Road to Ultra: Singapore welcomed over 11,000 people in attendance to the Marina Bay Sands Hotel.

=== 2016 ===
The first edition of Ultra Singapore took place at the Ultra Park, located near the Marina Bay Sands Hotel during 10–11 September 2016. Early bird tickets went on sale during early January and the round of Tier 2 tickets followed after. The phase one lineup for the festival was announced on 20 June 2016 and included Afrojack, Axwell & Ingrosso, deadmau5, Kygo, Nero, DJ Snake, Far East Movement, Jauz, and Marshmello. The phase two lineup was released on 29 July 2016 and included additions like Above & Beyond, Alesso, Zhu, Carnage, Gryffin, Matador, Nicole Moudaber, Reboot, Shaded live, Technasia, and W&W. There were three stages at Ultra Singapore, which included the Main Stage, Resistance stage, and the Live Stage. Singapore was the third country to host an Ultra Live stage, following Ultra Music Festival in Miami and Ultra Korea. The final lineup for Ultra Singapore was announced on 16 August 2016 which included the addition of regional and local acts. It was announced shortly after the inaugural edition of Ultra Singapore, that 45,000 people were in attendance.

=== 2017 ===
The second edition of Ultra Singapore took place once again at the Ultra Park during 10–11 June 2017. The phase one lineup was announced on 14 March 2017 and included the like of KSHMR, Tchami, Dash Berlin, Dubfire, Nic Fanciulli, Sasha & John Digweed, Steve Aoki, and many more. The phase two lineup was released on 17 May 2017 and included the additions of ANNA, Carlo Lio, Showtek, Henry Saiz, Rich Chigga and many more. The festival hosted three stages including the Main Stage, RESISTANCE stage, and the Live Stage.

=== 2019 ===
The fourth edition of Ultra Singapore was supposed to take place at Ultra Park, but was changed to the B2 level of the Sands Expo and Convention Centre at Marina Bay Sands. This information was relayed to the public less than five days to the festival.

== Legal History ==
In 2017 and 2018, there were at least eight suits filed against Ultra Singapore Pte Ltd for sums ranging from $3,745 to $74,686. In at least three of the cases, the plaintiffs have received payments.

== See also ==
- Ultra Music Festival
- Road to Ultra
- Russell Faibisch
- Ultra Brasil
- Ultra Buenos Aires
- Ultra Chile
- Ultra Japan
- Ultra Korea
- Ultra Bali
- Ultra South Africa
- Ultra Europe
