= Ultra Korea =

Music festival in Seoul, South Korea

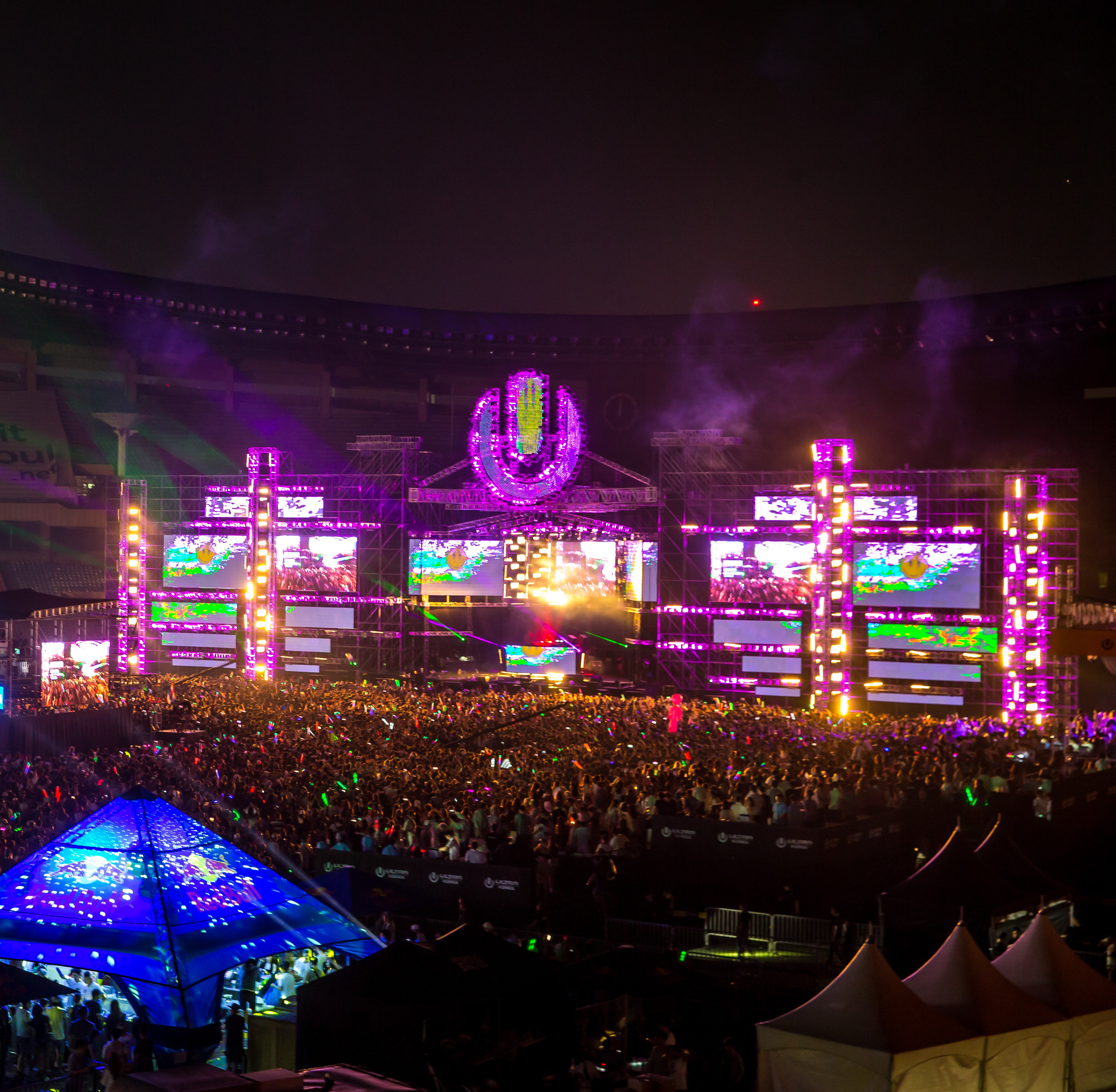
- Status: Active
- Genre: Electronic music festival
- Venue: Seoul Olympic Stadium
- Locations: Seoul, South Korea
- Years active: 2012-present (Seoul, Korea)
- Inaugurated: August 3, 2012
- Most recent: June 7–9, 2024
- Next event: TBD
- Organizer: Ultra Enterprises, Inc.
- Website: umfkorea.com

Ultra Korea is an outdoor electronic music festival that is a part of Ultra Music Festival's worldwide expansion, which has now spread to twenty countries. Following Ultra Brasil's third edition in 2011, Ultra Korea made its debut as a two-day festival in August 2012 and took place at the Olympic Stadium in Seoul, Korea. The most recent edition of Ultra Korea took place during 8–10 June 2018 at Seoul's Olympic Stadium. Ultra Korea is strictly a festival for those ages 19 and over. The next edition of Ultra Korea will take place during 7–9 June 2019 at the Olympic Stadium in Seoul.

== History ==
=== 2012 ===
The debut of Ultra Korea took place during 3–4 August 2012 at the Olympic Stadium in Seoul, Korea and featured three stages—Main Stage, Live Stage, and the Carl Cox & Friends Arena. This is the second Ultra Worldwide festival to ever host an Ultra Live Stage, following Miami. The first edition of Ultra Korea welcomed approximately 60,000 people in attendance and included the likes of Skrillex, Steve Aoki, Sidney Samson, J Symposium, Twelvetones, Marc Vedo, Elio Riso, Afrobeta, Tiesto, Team H, Chuckie, Sander Kleinenberg, The Crystal Method, Carl Cox, John Digweed, Yousef, and many more to Seoul's Olympic Stadium.

==== Day 1 Timetable (AUG 03 | FRI) ====
MAIN STAGE
TIME	ARTIST
04:00 PM	Cassette Schwarzenegger LIVE
04:30 PM	Massive DITTO
05:00 PM	Tokyo Big Boys
05:30 PM	Freakhouze
06:00 PM	Shut Da Mouth
06:35 PM	Sidney Samson
08:10 PM	Steve Aoki
10:00 PM	Skrillex

LIVE STAGE
TIME	ARTIST
04:00 PM	DJ Jamie
04:30 PM	Moriarty
05:00 PM	DJ MJ
05:30 PM	House Rulez LIVE
06:20 PM	Crying Nut LIVE
07:10 PM	Toxic Band LIVE
07:50 PM	Afrobeta LIVE
08:50 PM	Elio Riso
09:50 PM	Marc Vedo
10:30 PM	Twelvetones
11:00 PM	J Symposium

==== Day 2 Timetable (AUG 04 | SAT) ====
MAIN STAGE
TIME	ARTIST
04:00 PM	2E Love
04:20 PM	Aldrin
04:50 PM	capsule LIVE
05:30 PM	DJ Koo
06:05 PM	The Crystal Method
07:10 PM	Sander Kleinenberg
08:15 PM	Chuckie
09:20 PM	Team H
10:00 PM	Tiësto

CARL COX & FRIENDS ARENA
TIME	ARTIST
04:00 PM	Ken Ishii
05:00 PM	Jon Rundell
06:30 PM	Yousef
08:00 PM	John Digweed
10:00 PM	Carl Cox

LIVE STAGE
TIME	ARTIST
04:00 PM	Amiga
04:30 PM	DJ Aya
05:00 PM	DJ Hoon
05:30 PM	Unjin
06:00 PM	DJ Ahn
06:30 PM	DJ Ogawa
07:20 PM	Beat Burger & Trax LIVE
08:10 PM	Handsome People LIVE
09:00 PM	Clazziquai Project LIVE
09:50 PM	Mauri & Mora
10:30 PM	Kultech
11:30 PM	DJ Greive
00:15 AM	DJ Bo

=== 2013 ===
Ultra Korea returned to the Olympic Stadium in Seoul, Korea during 14–15 June 2013 for its second edition and featured the same three stages from the year before—Main Stage, Live Stage, and the Carl Cox & Friends Arena. This edition of Ultra Korea included Armin van Buuren, Kaskade, Afrojack, Krewella, Tommy Trash, Carl Cox, Adam Beyer, Nicole Moudaber, RioTGeaR, Moriarty, Roger Shah, DJ Junior, Avicii, Fedde Le Grand, Sander van Doorn, Cazzette, Victor Calderone, and many more.

==== Day 1 Timetable (JUNE 14 | FRI) ====
MAIN STAGE
TIME	ARTIST
04:00 PM	Big Bad Nose
04:30 PM	DJ KOO
05:00 PM	Shinichi Osawa
05:45 PM	Tommy Trash
06:45 PM	Krewella
07:45 PM	Afrojack
08:45 PM	Kaskade
10:15 PM	Armin van Buuren

CARL COX & FRIENDS ARENA
TIME	ARTIST
03:00 PM	
03:30 PM	Gio Vanhoutte
04:00 PM	Unjin
04:30 PM	DJ AHN
05:00 PM	RioTGeaR
06:00 PM	Nicole Moudaber
08:00 PM	Adam Beyer
10:00 PM	Carl Cox

LIVE STAGE
TIME	ARTIST
03:00 PM	Ruby Star LIVE
03:30 PM	DJ VIXX
04:00 PM	Ken Ziro
04:30 PM	DJ AYA
05:00 PM	G-Park
05:30 PM	Drill
06:15 PM	DJ KYOKO
07:10 PM	Anamanaguchi LIVE
08:15 PM	Perfume LIVE
09:15 PM	DJ Junior
10:00 PM	Roger Shah
11:00 PM	Moriarty

==== Day 2 Timetable (JUNE 15 | SAT) ====
MAIN STAGE
TIME	ARTIST
04:00 PM	Shut Da Mouth
04:30 PM	Taku Takahashu
05:15 PM	Boy George
06:15 PM	Adventure Club
07:15 PM	Cazzette
08:15 PM	Sander van Doorn
09:15 PM	Fedde Le Grand
10:15 PM	AVICII

CARL COX & FRIENDS ARENA
TIME	ARTIST
03:00 PM	G-Tech
03:30 PM	Double Strike
04:00 PM	Cosmik Riders
04:30 PM	Mauri & Mora
05:15 PM	Massive Ditto
06:00 PM	Yousef
08:00 PM	Victor Calderone
10:00 PM	Carl Cox

LIVE STAGE
TIME	ARTIST
03:00 PM	Bagagee Viphex13
03:30 PM	Hizkia
04:00 PM	Jusstin Oh
04:30 PM	2ELOVE
05:00 PM	TOKYO BIG BOYs
05:40 PM	Agent Smith
06:30 PM	Beat Burger LIVE
07:20 PM	YB LIVE
08:15 PM	DJ Aki
09:00 PM	Los de la Vega
10:00 PM	Pedro Del Mar
11:00 PM	Jamie

=== 2014 ===
In 2014, Ultra Korea once again returned to the Olympic Stadium in Seoul, Korea during 13–14 June, for its third edition. Two new stages were added to Ultra Korea 2014—the Mega Outdoor Stage and the Underground Stage, which replaced the Carl Cox & Friends Arena. Ultra Korea's third edition featured the likes of Above & Beyond, Steve Aoki, Laidback Luke, Nervo, Sick Individuals, Empire of the Sun, the Bloody Beetroots (live), Heatbeat, Morgan Page, Steve Angello, Paul van Dyk, W&W, Blasterjaxx, Infected Mushroom, M.I.A., Far East Movement, Nic Fanciulli, Sasha, and many more.

=== 2015 ===
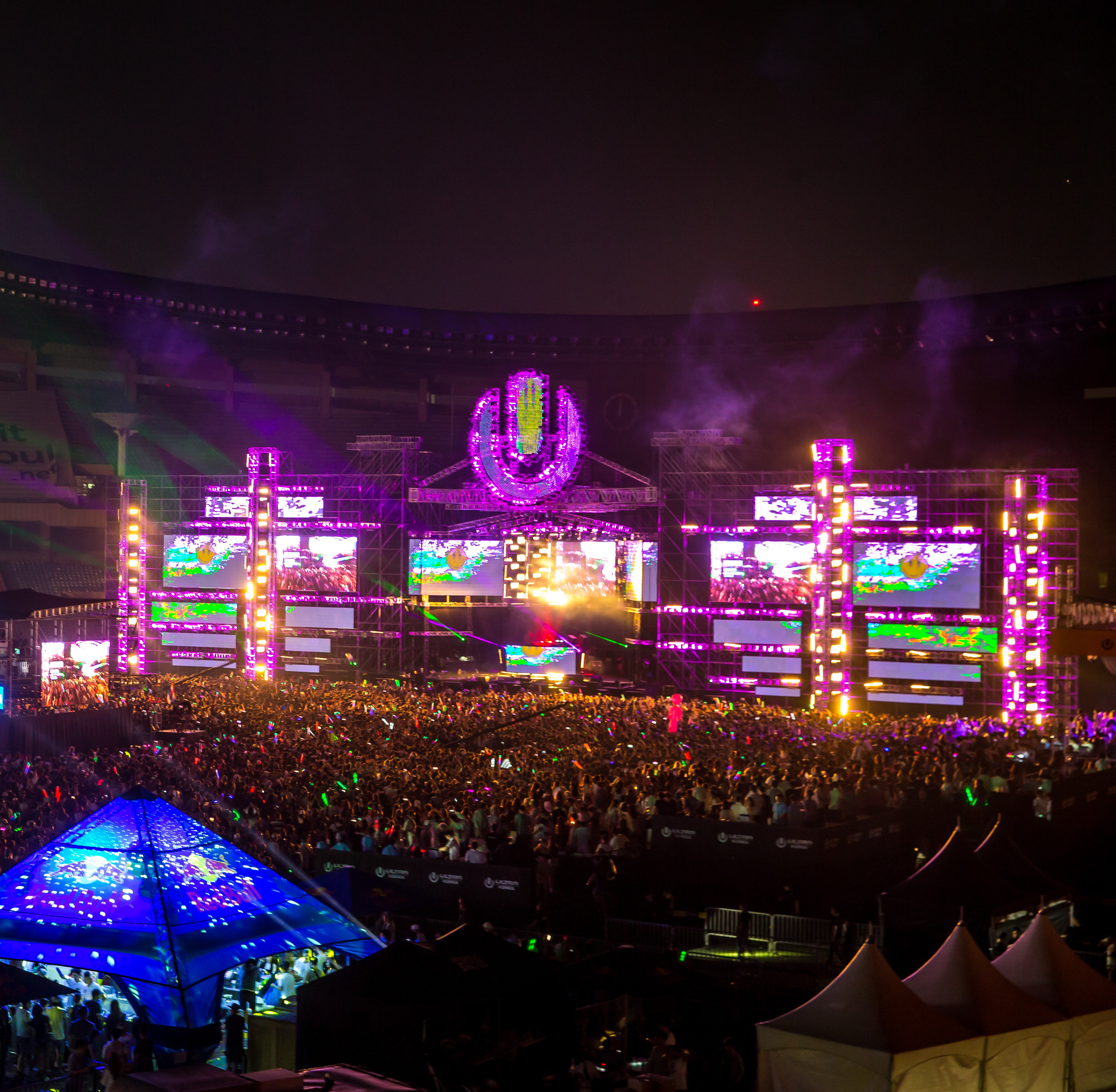
Live stage at Ultra Korea 2015

2015 marked Ultra Korea's fourth event and was held at Seoul's Olympic Stadium once again and took place during 12–13 June 2015. This edition replaced the Mega Outdoor Stage with a new stage entitled the Magic Beach Stage. Artists on the bill for Ultra Korea 2015 were Hardwell, Skrillex, Nicky Romero, DVBBS, Justin Oh, Porter Robinson, 2ManyDJs, Kennedy Jones, Los de La Vega, Protoculture, David Guetta, Alesso, Knife Party, Galantis, Snoop Dogg, Lil Jon, Nic Fanciulli, Pirupa, and many more. Ultra Korea drew 110,000 fans from all over to the Olympic Stadium in 2015.

=== 2016 ===
The fifth edition of Ultra Korea has expanded to three days and took place during 10–12 June 2016 at the Olympic Stadium in Seoul, Korea. The fifth edition consisted of four stages—Main Stage, Live Stage, Underground Stage, and the Magic Beach Stage. Artists on the bill for Ultra Korea's fifth edition included Afrojack, Avicii, Armin van Buuren, Axwell & Ingrosso, Chase and Status (live), deadmau5, Knife Party, Martin Garrix, Heatbeat, Eelke Kleijn, Rabbit in the Moon, Fedde Le Grand, Jauz, Netsky (live), Sunnery James & Ryan Marciano, Justin Oh, and many more. Ultra Korea drew in a record-breaking 150,000+ strong crowd, for what was officially the largest electronic music festival ever to take place on Korean soil.

=== 2017 ===
To celebrate Ultra Korea returning in 2017 to Seoul, a special private sale took place on 23 August 2016 and the allotted tickets were sold out within that day. Tickets continued to go on and off sale throughout the remainder of the year. On 1 February 2017, the official dates for Ultra Korea's 6th edition were announced (10–11 June 2017). The event will run simultaneously with Ultra Singapore, making it the second time Ultra Worldwide held a number of events on the same day, and the first 2-day festival to do so. The phase one lineup for Ultra Korea 2017 was announced 10 March 2017 and includes Axwell ^ Ingrosso, Dash Berlin, Don Diablo, Dubfire, KSHMR (live), Nic Fanciulli, Nicky Romero, Sasha & John Digweed, Sam Feldt, SHRKTOPS, Steve Aoki, and Tchami (live). The phase 2 lineup was announced on April 28, 2017.

=== 2018 ===
For the seventh edition of Ultra Korea, the festival is returning to a three-day event, taking place on 8–10 June 2018. Phase 1 lineup of Ultra Korea was released on 4 April 2018 and included Above & Beyond, Axwell & Ingrosso, The Chainsmokers, David Guetta, Galantis, Nicky Romero, Steve Angello, Zedd and Zhu.

=== 2019 ===
For the eighth edition of Ultra Korea, the festival is returning to a three-day event, taking place on 7–9 June 2019. The lineup includes Martin Garrix, Skrillex, Virtual Self and Jamie Jones as main artists.

Martin Garrix, and Swedish House Mafia on each day they were supposed to perform of the event, cancelled due to various reasons. Martin Garrix and Swedish House Mafia were originally slated as headliners. Refunds were issued in the amount of 1/3 of the tickets purchased.

== See also ==
- List of electronic dance music festivals
- Ultra Music Festival
- Russell Faibisch
- Ultra Brasil
- Ultra Japan
- Ultra Chile
- Ultra Buenos Aires
- Ultra Singapore
- Road to Ultra
- Ultra South Africa
- Ultra Europe
- Ultra Bali
