= Ultra Bali =

Outdoor electronic music festival

- Status: Active
- Genre: Electronic music festival
- Venue: Potato Head Beach Club
- Locations: Bali, Indonesia
- Years active: 2015–present
- Organizer: Ultra Worldwide
- Website: ultrabali.com

Ultra Bali is an outdoor electronic music festival that is a part of Ultra Music Festival's worldwide expansion, which has now spread to twenty countries. The debut of Ultra Bali took place during 24–25 September 2015 and was held at the Potato Head Beach Club located in Bali, Indonesia. Ultra Bali is an event strictly for those 19 and over. The most recent edition of Ultra Bali took place once again at the Potato Head Beach Club during 15–16 September 2016.

== History ==
=== 2015 ===
Ultra Bali's first edition lasted two days and featured three stages across the Potato Head Beach Club—Main Stage, Resistance Stage, and the UMF Radio Stage. Tickets for the two-day festival sold out within a week of being on sale, without any announcement of a lineup. The festival featured the likes of Ansolo, Kygo, Vicetone, Fedde Le Grand, Alesso, Gorgon City, James Zabiela, Christian Smith, Mija, A-Trak, Zeds Dead, Skrillex, Henry Saiz, Marc Romboy, and many more. Approximately 10,000 people joined together at the Potato Head Beach Club for Ultra Bali's sold out debut.

=== 2016 ===
The second edition of Ultra Bali took place during 15–16 September 2016 at the Potato Head Beach Club in Bali, Indonesia once again. Early-bird tickets went on sale on 8 July 2016 and the next tier of tickets followed after. The phase one lineup for Ultra Bali's second edition was announced on 17 July 2016 and included the likes of Afrojack, deadmau5, Dubfire, Martin Garrix, Galantis, Gryffin, Jauz, Marshmello, Matador, Nic Fanciulli, Nicole Moudaber, Reboot, Technasia, and Thomas Jack. There were two stages at the second edition of Ultra Bali—Mainstage and the Resistance stage.

== See also ==
- List of electronic music festivals
- Ultra Music Festival
- Russell Faibisch
- Ultra Brasil
- Ultra Buenos Aires
- Ultra Chile
- Ultra Europe
- Ultra Japan
- Ultra Korea
- Ultra Singapore
- Ultra South Africa
- Road to Ultra
