= Russell Faibisch =

American music festival producer and concert promoter (born 1977)

- Born: July 7, 1977 (age 49); Miami Beach, Florida, US
- Education: Florida International University
- Occupations: Producer; promoter
- Title: co-founder of Ultra Music Festival; CEO, President and Executive Producer of Ultra Organization
- Honours: Power List of DJs and Executives (2016-2017); Industry Person of the Year (2017)

Russell Faibisch (born July 7, 1977) is an American music festival producer and concert promoter. He is the co-founder of the Ultra Music Festival, an outdoor electronic music festival in Miami, and creator of the Ultra Worldwide brand. He is CEO, President, and Executive producer of the Ultra organization, and is also the chairman of the board, upon which and Adam Russakoff serve. Currently, Faibisch presides over an international chain of branded music festivals, concerts, and events, which include editions spanning across Europe, Australia, Asia, Africa, South, and North America, plus globally syndicated radio broadcasts, an online YouTube channel, music films, and premieres. In April 2016, Ultra Music Festival won the DJ Mag award for "World's Number 1 Festival," which was voted on by over 500,000 fans worldwide. In 2008, Ultra was also given the DJ Award for "International Dance Music Festival"." In 2014, Faibisch was ranked #6 on Rolling Stone's "Most Important People in EDM List." Later that year, Billboard named Faibisch and business partner Adam Russakoff on the "EDM Power Players - Executives List. In 2016 and 2017, both Faibisch and Russakoff were again named on Billboards annual "Power List of DJs and Executives." In 2017, Magnetic Magazine named Faibisch the "Industry Person of the Year."

== Early life and education ==
Russell Faibisch was born in Miami Beach, Florida and majored in business at Florida International University.

== Career ==
=== Creation of Ultra ===
In 1997, Faibisch created the Ultra brand in relation to event productions when he formed Ultra Productions, and began producing electronic music warehouse events and rave parties in Miami, including Amoeba in 1998 and Magical Maydaze. Both events were co-produced with then business associate, Ray Navarro. After placing an ad in a local music magazine for one of his events, Faibisch met Alex Omes, publisher of D'VOX magazine. Faibisch and Omes quickly became friends and business partners, together co-founding the Ultra Music Festival. Ultra Music Festival paved the way and built the modern dance festival foundation. Since its founding, Ultra Music Festival has grown into one of the world's largest electronic dance music festivals. An estimated 400,000 people attended Ultra Music Festival over the course of two weekends in 2013, the highest number of attendees to date.

The international festival, founded by Faibisch and Omes, has taken place every March since its inception in 1999 at Collins Park, Miami. The festival celebrated its nineteenth anniversary from 24–26 March 2017 by bringing over 165,000 people to the sold out event at Bayfront Park located in downtown Miami. Ultra Music Festival returns to Bayfront Park for its twentieth anniversary, 23–25 March 2018.

=== Expansion ===
The Ultra and Ultra Worldwide brands represent the world's biggest and most successful remaining independent electronic music festival brand. The Ultra Worldwide brand, created by Faibisch, has established festivals and events in twenty countries internationally across five continents—including Argentina, Bali, Brazil, Chile, Croatia, Ibiza, Japan, Korea, South Africa, Bolivia, Colombia, Hong Kong, Paraguay, Peru, the Philippines, Puerto Rico, Singapore, Taiwan, Thailand, and of course Miami.

In 2017 Ultra Mexico first edition in Mexico took place in Foro Pegaso located 30min away from Mexico City. The biggest stage of Ultra history took place here with headliners like Dash Berlin, Alesso, Armin van Buuren, Afrojack and Martin Garrix among others.

Additionally, Faibisch and the Ultra brands pioneered the live stream experience, Ultra Live, where the festival is brought online to over 20 million viewers globally and the audio broadcasting platform UMF Radio, which was winner of Mixcloud's 2015 "Best EDM Radio Show" and is now syndicated to FM Radio in over 93 countries.

In 2012, Faibisch and Ultra Worldwide also launched UMF Films, a collaboration with Amsterdam-based film company Final Kid, which has gone on to produce many of Ultra's after movies—including a feature-length documentary exploring the rise of dance music, entitled "Can U Feel It" which premiered on 21 March 2012 at the Klipsch Amphitheater in Bayfront Park. "Can U Feel It" was also released in select theaters across the United States for one night only, on 22 March 2012.

== See also ==
- Ultra Music Festival
- Ultra Brasil
- Ultra Korea
- Ultra Buenos Aires
- Ultra Japan
- Ultra Chile
- Ultra Singapore
- Ultra South Africa
- Ultra Europe
- Ultra Bali
- Road to Ultra
