= Ultra Chile =

Outdoor electronic music festival

- Status: Active
- Genre: Electronic music festival
- Venue: 2013: Espacio Brodway; 2014 (RTU): Ritoque (Valparaíso); 2014: O'higgins Park and Movistar Arena; 2015: Ciudad Empresarial; 2016 (RTU): Movistar Arena
- Locations: Santiago, Chile
- Years active: 2013-present (Santiago)
- Organizer: Ultra Worldwide
- Website: chile.roadtoultra.com

Ultra Chile is an outdoor electronic music festival that is a part of Ultra Music Festival's worldwide expansion, which has now spread to twenty countries. The debut of Ultra Chile took place at the Piscinas Espacio Broadway in Santiago, Chile. The Road to Ultra: Chile took place in Santiago, Chile on 8 October 2016 at the Movistar Arena.

== History ==
=== 2013 ===
Ultra Chile's debut lasted two days and took place during 22–23 February 2013. The festival featured two stages—Main Stage and the Carl Cox & Friends/Armada Stage. The festival featured the likes of Carl Cox, Marco Carola, UMEK, Nina Kraviz, Sean Tyas, Betsie Larkin, Shogun, Alex M.O.R.P.H., Afrojack, Armin van Buuren, Sander van Doorn, Markus Schulz, Knife Party, Hardwell, Avicii, Dash Berlin, Jerome Isma-Ae, Martin Solveig, and many more.

More than 20,000 people were in attendance for Ultra Chile's debut at Espacio Broadway.

=== 2014 ===
After the inaugural edition of Road to Ultra: Chile took place in Valparaiso, Chile during February 2014, the organizers behind Ultra Chile implemented an age restriction for the festival's second edition.

This edition of Ultra Chile was held at the Movistar Arena and O'Higgins Park in Santiago, Chile during 11–12 October 2014 and only those ages 16 and over were able to attend. The festival featured three stages—the Main Stage, DJ Mag Latinoamerica Stage, and the Carl Cox & Friends/Ultra Worldwide Arena. Featured artists included Carl Craig, Carl Cox, Steve Lawler, Steve Angello, Dash Berlin, Borgore, Sunnery James & Ryan Marciano, Festa Bros, Jorn van Deynhoven, Ben Gold, Emma Hewitt, Tomas Heredia, Armin van Buuren, Nervo, Headhunterz, and many more. The second edition of Ultra Chile welcomed about 40,000 people in attendance to Santiago.

=== 2015 ===
The third edition of Ultra Chile was once again moved to a new venue, the Ciudad Empresarial in Santiago, Chile and took place on 10 October 2015. The festival was also changed to last one day instead of two, and featured three stages—Main Stage, Drumcode Stage, and the DJ Mag Latinoamerica Stage. Artists for the third edition of Ultra Chile included the likes of Heatbeat, Vinai, Dzeko & Torres, Fedde Le Grand, Knife Party, DJ Snake, Axwell & Ingrosso, Dash Berlin, GTA, Nick Curly, Luigi Madonna, Ida Engberg, Adam Beyer, Alan Fitzpatrick, and many more. About 20,000 people were in attendance for the third edition of Ultra Chile.

=== 2016 ===
The fourth edition of Ultra Chile returned as a Road to Ultra event for 2016. This edition of the Road to Ultra: Chile took place on 8 October 2016 at the Movistar Arena in Santiago, Chile. The lineup for the Road to Ultra: Chile included Martin Garrix, Carnage, Dash Berlin, Deorro, Jauz, and other local supporting acts.

== See also ==
- List of electronic dance music festivals
- Ultra Music Festival
- Russell Faibisch
- Ultra Brasil
- Ultra Buenos Aires
- Road to Ultra
- Ultra Korea
- Ultra Japan
- Ultra Singapore
- Ultra Bali
- Ultra South Africa
- Ultra Europe
