= Nicole Moudaber =

Lebanese British DJ and record producer

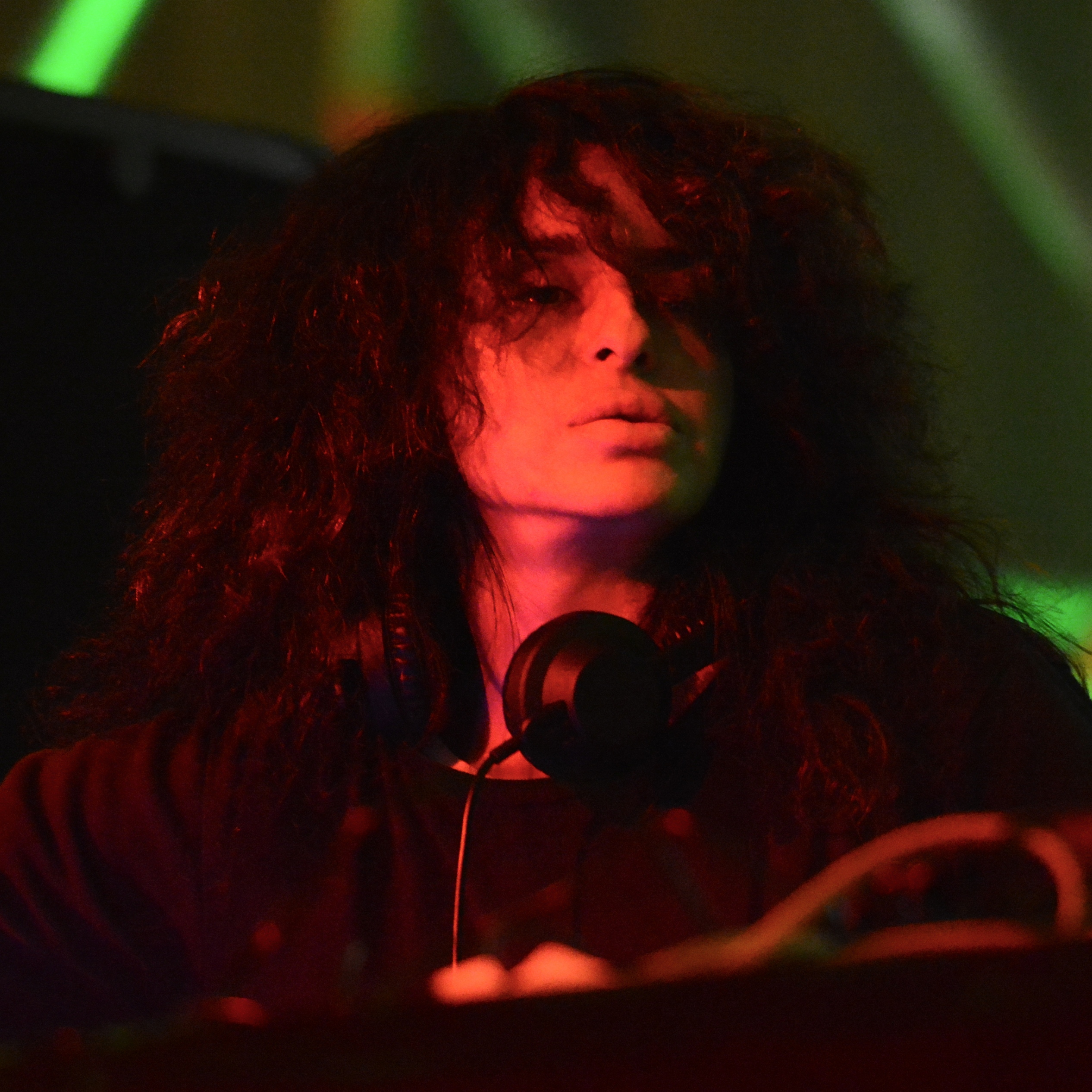
- Nicole Moudaber at Mayday 2014

Background information
- Born: Nicole Moudaber; 19 January 1977 (age 49); Ibadan, Oyo, Nigeria
- Genres: Techno, electronica, deep house, house, tech house
- Occupations: Producer, DJ, promoter
- Years active: 2008–present
- Labels: 8 Sided Dice, Area Remote, Azuli Back Catalog, Intacto, Intec, iVAV Recordings, Kling Klong, Leena Music, Monique Musique, Monique Speciale, MOOD Records, Plastic City. Play, Rawthentic Music, VIVa Music, Waveform Recordings, Yellow Tail
- Website: nicolemoudaber.com

Nicole Moudaber (born 19 January 1977 in Ibadan, Nigeria) is a Lebanese/British event promoter, record label founder, radio personality, and DJ/producer. She is the head of her own imprint MOOD Records and runs a weekly radio show, In The MOOD.

== Biography ==
Nicole Moudaber was born in Nigeria. She began her career promoting dance parties in Beirut, Lebanon during the 1990s, before transferring to London where she attended pointblank music school where she studied DJing and established herself as a DJ and producer. She came to the attention of Carl Cox in 2009 when she signed to his record label Intec. She released her first album Believe in 2013 on Drumcode Records.

Moudaber has been featured by Billboard, The New York Times, CNN, Paper, Mixmag, and Dancing Astronaut.

Moudaber started In The Mood Radio in 2014 and it broadcasts weekly in over 50 countries, on over 70 FM stations. Moudaber is also an Ambassador of the Association For Electronic Music (AFEM) alongside Armin van Buuren, Nile Rodgers, Pete Tong, Seth Troxler, Louie Vega and others.

=== Philanthropy ===
Moudaber is a public advocate of Lower Eastside Girls Club, an organization that helps disadvantaged young women pursue a career in music.

== MOOD Records ==
Moudaber launched her own imprint, MOOD Records, on 25 February 2013 with the release of her In The Mood EP. The official launch party for the imprint took place at Pacha NYC on Saturday, 26 January. The imprint has released music from Moudaber, Carl Cox, Carlo Lio, Francisco Allendes, Joel Mull, Juvenal (SKIN), Marino Canal, Pan-Pot, Pleasurekraft and Victor Calderone. In 2015, Moudaber collaborated with Skin from Skunk Anansie to release the "Breed" EP. A remix EP titled ‘'BREED The RMXS'’ was released in 2016, featuring remixes from Carl Craig, Fur Coat, Hector, Jamie Jones, Paco Osuna, Pan-Pot, and Scuba.

== Touring ==
=== MoodRAW ===
In September 2014, Moudaber announced her "MoodRAW" tour which saw her play in underground transformed spaces such as warehouses. The events were in five cities: London, Montreal, Chicago, Los Angeles, and Brooklyn. The tour included artists such as Anja Schneider, Joel Mull, Marino Canal, Victor Calderone, Raiz and Danny Tenaglia.

=== MoodZONE ===
May 2016 saw the debut of Moudaber's festival stage concept, titled "MoodZONE", at Electric Daisy Carnival: New York where she played with Chris Liebing. MoodZONE also appeared at Insomniac's event in June 2017, Electric Daisy Carnival: Las Vegas. In July 2017, it was announced that MoodZONE would appear at Utopia Island in Munich on 12 August and Escape: Psycho Circus in San Bernardino, California on 28 October.

=== MoodDAY ===
In 2016, for Winter Music Conference, Nicole announced her MoodDAY Miami Pool Party concept to celebrate the 100th episode of her Mood Radio show.

=== Festivals ===
Moudaber often plays at DC-10, Amnesia, Space Ibiza.

Moudaber has also played a number of festivals including Coachella, Electric Daisy Carnival, Tomorrowland, Glastonbury, Movement Detroit and Mysteryland USA.

== Discography ==
=== Albums ===
Include

- Believe (2013)

=== Singles & EPs ===
Include

- See You Next Tuesday Remixes (MOOD, 2017)
- Empty Space EP (Intec Digital, 2017)
- Your Love Picks Me Up (Truesoul, 2017)
- Love Someone Else (MOOD, 2016)
- Silent Sigh EP (MOOD, 2016)
- Where Shadows Lie (Intec Digital, 2016)
- BREED (MOOD, 2015)
- Somewhere in our Minds (Truesoul, 2015)
- Her Dub Material (MOOD, 2015)
- The Whippin' I'm Dishin' (MOOD, 2014)
- Bittersweet EP (Drumcode, 2014)
- See You Next Tuesday (MOOD, 2014)
- One Day Later (Intec Digital, 2014)
- Give Me Body (MOOD, 2013)
- In The Mood (MOOD, 2013)
- Roar (Intec Digital, 2013)
- Sonic Language EP (Drumcode, 2013)
- In the Mood (MOOD Records, 2013)
- The Journey Begins (Drumcode, 2012)
- Hair (Leena Music, 2012)
- I'm A Gangsta (Kling Klong, 2012)
- Different Meanings (8 Sided Dice Recordings, 2011)
- Who Said EP (Waveform Recordings, 2011)
- Feline EP (Intec Digital, 2011)
- Break It EP (Kling Klong, 2011)
- She Wears the Pants (Intacto Records, 2010)
- Mi Cabeza (Monique Spéciale, 2010)
- Home Sweet Home (Yellow Tail, 2010)
- Get Fresh (Nocturnal Groove, 2008)

=== Compilations ===
Include

- Mood 50 – The Best of Mood (MOOD, 2017)

== Awards and nominations/accomplishments ==
=== Online Radio Awards ===
Year	Nominee / work	Award	Result
2014	Nicole Moudaber 'In The Mood Radio'	Best Online Music Show, Dance/Electronic	Nominated
2015	Nicole Moudaber 'In The Mood Radio'	Best Online Music Show, Dance/Electronic	Nominated
2016	Nicole Moudaber 'In The Mood Radio'	Overall winner, Best Online Music Show	Won

=== DJ Awards ===
Year	Nominee / work	Award	Result
2013	Nicole Moudaber	Best Techno DJ	Nominated
2014	Nicole Moudaber	Best Techno DJ	Nominated
2016	Nicole Moudaber	Best Techno DJ	Nominated
2017	Nicole Moudaber	Best Techno DJ	Nominated

=== International Dance Music Awards ===
Year	Nominee / work	Award	Result
2012	Nicole Moudaber	Best Minimal/Techno Track for "Chemistry (Nicole Moudaber Remix) - Carl Cox" - Intec	Won
2014	Nicole Moudaber	Best Tech-House/Techno Track for "Roar"	Nominated
2016	Nicole Moudaber	Best Techno/Tech House DJ	Nominated
2016	Nicole Moudaber	Best Tech House/Techno Track for Giv Me Luv (Nicole Moudaber Remix) - Alcatraz	Won

=== Electronic Music Awards ===
Year	Category	Nominated work	Result
2017	Radio Show of the Year	In The Mood	Nominated
