= Ray =

Ray or RAY may refer to:

== Fish ==
- Ray (fish), any cartilaginous fish of the superorder Batoidea
- Fish fin § Ray-fins, the bony or horny spine on ray-finned fish

== Arts, entertainment and media ==
=== Music ===
- The Rays, an American musical group active in the 1950s
- Ray (girl group), a Japanese girl group formed in 2019
- Ray (Bump of Chicken album), 2014
- Ray (Frazier Chorus album), 1991
- Ray (L'Arc-en-Ciel album), 1999
- Rays (Michael Nesmith album), 2005
- Ray (soundtrack), 2004
- Ray (EP), by Panic Channel, 2008
- "Ray" (song), by Millencolin, 2005

=== Other uses in arts, entertainment and media ===
- Ray (film magazine), an Austrian film magazine
- Ray (art magazine), a British little magazine
- Ray (film), a 2004 film biography of Ray Charles
- Ray (manga), a science fiction manga and anime series
- Ray (TV series), a 2021 anthology series based on Satyajit Ray's stories
- The Ray (Chardin), a 1728 painting by Jean Simeon Chardin
- Ray (DC Comics), a sequence of DC Comics characters sharing related light manipulation powers

- Freedom Fighters: The Ray, an animated series featuring one of the characters

== Businesses and organisations ==
- Rays (retailer), an Australian outdoors store
- Rays Wheels, a Japanese automotive wheel manufacturer
- Finland's Slot Machine Association, or RAY

== People ==
- Ray (given name), including a list of people and fictional characters with the name
- Ray (surname), including a list of people and fictional characters with the name
- Ray (musician) (Reika Nakayama, born 1990), Japanese singer
- Ray J (William Ray Norwood, Jr, born 1981), American singer
- Ray (wrestler) (1982–2018), Hong Kong professional wrestler
- Rayasianboy (born 2005), Taiwanese online streamer and content creator

== Places ==
=== Iran ===
- Ray, Iran, in Greater Tehran
  - Ray County, Iran
- Ray, South Khorasan

=== Russia ===
- Ray, Belgorod Oblast
- Ray, Smolensk Oblast

=== United Kingdom ===
- River Ray, in Buckinghamshire and Oxfordshire, England
- River Ray, Wiltshire, in England

=== United States ===
- Ray, Alabama
- Ray, Arizona
- Ray, Indiana and Michigan
- Ray Township, Michigan, Macomb County
- Ray, Minnesota
- Ray County, Missouri
- Ray, North Dakota
- Ray, Ohio
- Ray, Virginia

=== Elsewhere ===
- Ray, Keh Chong Commune, Cambodia
- Ray-sur-Saône, France
- Ray, Templeport, County Cavan, Ireland
- Ray, Jharkhand, India
- Mount Ray (British Columbia), in Canada

== Science and technology ==
- Ray (geometry) or half-line
- Ray (graph theory), a semi-infinite simple path in an infinite graph
- Ray (optics), an idealized geometrical model of light
- Ray (quantum theory), in projective Hilbert space
- Sunwah Linux, formerly RAYS Linux, a Chinese Linux distribution
- Sony Ericsson Xperia ray, a 2011 smartphone

== Sports ==
- Tampa Bay Rays, an American baseball team

== Transportation and military ==
- Kia Ray, a South Korean city car from 2011
- Kia Ray (2010 concept vehicle), a South Korean mid-size sedan
- Mitsuoka Ray, a Japanese city car 1996–2004
- Raynes Park railway station, London, England, station code RAY
- USS Ray, the name of two submarines of the United States Navy

== See also ==
- Rai (disambiguation)
- Raye (disambiguation)
- Reye (disambiguation)
- Wray (disambiguation)
- Wrey (disambiguation)
- Rao (disambiguation)
- Rhea (disambiguation)
- Radius (disambiguation)
- Radiation (disambiguation)
- Raymond (disambiguation)
- Beam (disambiguation)
- Rye (disambiguation)
- Justice Ray (disambiguation)
- Medullary ray (anatomy)
- Medullary ray (botany)
- Rāʾ ("ر"), a letter of the Arabic alphabet
- Re, the second scale degree in solfège
