= Wray (surname) =

- Pronunciation: /reɪ/, RAY

Origin
- Origin: Old English
- Meaning: derived from places in Lancashire and Cumberland named Wray, Wrea, or Wreay; Ultimately from Old Norse vrá (meaning ‘nook’ or ‘corner’)
- Region of origin: England, Ireland

Other names
- Variant forms: Wray, Wrea, Wreay, Wroe, Wrœ, etc.

Wray (/reɪ/) is a surname commonly found in the United States, England, Canada, and Australia. It may refer to:

== Titles ==
- The Wray baronets, two extinct titles in the Baronetage of England, including lists of titleholders

== Persons ==
- Albert A. Wray (1858–1924), New York politician and lawyer
- Arthur Wray (1906–1993), Canadian politician
- Bill Wray (born 1956), American cartoonist and landscape painter
- Bill Wray (composer), American musician, composer and producer
- Chester B. Wray (1923–2006), California politician
- Christopher Wray, multiple people
- Daniel Wray (1701–1783), English antiquary and Fellow of the Royal Society
- Edward Wray (1589–1658), English courtier and politician
- Elinor Caroline Wray (1899–1992), Australian speech therapist
- Emma Wray (born 1965), English actress
- Fawcet Wray (1873–1932), British naval officer
- Fay Wray (1907–2004), Canadian–American actress best known for her starring role in the film King Kong
- Floyd L. Wray, one of the two founders of Flamingo Gardens
- Collin Raye (born Floyd Elliot Wray, born 1960), American country singer-songwriter
- Harmon Wray (c. 1947–2007), American prison reformer, human rights and death penalty activist
- Henry Wray (1826–1900), British Army lieutenant-general and Lieutenant Governor of Jersey
- Jane Wray, one of the two founders of Flamingo Gardens
- Jimmy Wray (1935–2013), Scottish politician
- John Wray (politician) (born 1971), Texas House of Representatives
- Jon Wray (born 1970), English rugby union and rugby league footballer who played in the 1990s and 2000s
- L. Randall Wray (born 1953), American economist and academic
- Leonora Wray (1886–1979), Australian golfer often referred to as the "mother" of Australian golf
- Link Wray (1929–2005), American rock and roll musician
- Lud Wray (1894–1967), American football player and coach, and co-founder of the Philadelphia Eagles team
- Lyliana Wray (born 2002), American actress
- Margaret Jane Wray (1962–2025), American operatic soprano
- Martha Wray (1739–1788), English medical manufacturer
- Mia Wray (born 1995), Australian pop singer-songwriter
- Michael H. Wray (born 1967), North Carolina politician
- Naomi Wray, Australian geneticist
- Nicole Wray (born 1981), American R&B singer and songwriter
- Peter Wray (born 1937), Australian sports shooter
- Scotty Wray (died 2022), American country singer-songwriter
- Taylor Wray (born 1981), Canadian lacrosse player
- Sir William Wray, 1st Baronet, of Ashby (1625–1669), English politician
- Sir William Wray, 1st Baronet, of Glentworth (1555–1617), English politician
- William Fitzwater Wray (d. 1938), cycling journalist
- William Wray (artist) (born 1956), American cartoonist and landscape painter
- William Wray (politician) (1876–1946), American politician in the state of Washington

== See also ==
- Wray (disambiguation)
- Wrey (disambiguation)
- Ray (disambiguation)
