= Raymond Township, Illinois =

Raymond Township, Illinois may refer to one of the following townships:

- Raymond Township, Champaign County, Illinois
- Raymond Township, Montgomery County, Illinois

See also

- Raymond Township (disambiguation)
