= Raymond (disambiguation) =

Raymond is a given name and surname, including a list of persons and fictional characters with the name.

Raymond may also refer to:

== Places ==
=== United States ===
- Raymond, California, an unincorporated community
- Raymond, Illinois, a town
- Raymond, Indiana, an unincorporated town
- Raymond, Iowa, a city
- Raymond, Kansas, a city
- Raymond, Maine, a town
- Raymond, Michigan, a ghost town
- Raymond, Minnesota, a city
- Raymond, Mississippi, a city
  - Battle of Raymond, during the American Civil War
- Raymond, Montana, an unincorporated community
- Raymond, Nebraska, a village
- Raymond, New Hampshire, a New England town
  - Raymond (CDP), New Hampshire, the main village in the town
- Raymond, New York, an unincorporated hamlet
- Raymond, Ohio, an unincorporated community
- Raymond, South Dakota, a town
- Raymond, Washington, a city
- Raymond, Wisconsin, a town
- Raymond (community), Wisconsin
- Raymond Township (disambiguation)

=== Elsewhere ===
- Raymond, Alberta, Canada, a town
- Raymond, a community in the township of Muskoka Lakes, Ontario, Canada
- Raymond, Cher, France, a commune
- Raymond, Haiti, a village in the Sud department
- Raymond Island, Victoria, Australia

== Facilities and structures ==
- Raymond Field, a multi-purpose stadium in Wolfville, Nova Scotia, Canada
- Raymond High School (disambiguation)
- Raymond Theatre, Raymond, Washington

== Arts and entertainment ==
- "Raymond" (song), by American country music singer Brett Eldredge
- Raymond, ou Le secret de la reine, a comic opera by Ambroise Thomas
- Raymond (mascot), the mascot of the Tampa Bay Rays baseball team
- Raymond (Animal Crossing), a fictional character in the Animal Crossing series of video games

== Other uses ==
- Hurricane Raymond (1983), in the eastern Pacific Ocean
- Hurricane Raymond (1989), the strongest tropical cyclone of the 1989 Pacific hurricane season
- Raymond (1782 EIC ship), a British East Indiaman
- Raymond Group, an Indian clothing and toiletries conglomerate

== See also ==
- Waymond (disambiguation)
- Ray (disambiguation)
