= Raye (disambiguation) =

Raye (born 1997) is a British singer-songwriter.

Raye may also refer to:

== People with the given name ==
- Raye Hartmann (born 1990), Canadian football player
- Raye Birk (born 1943), American film and television actor
- Raye Hollitt (born 1964), American actress and female bodybuilder
- Raye Montague (1935–2018), United States Naval Engineer
- Raye Renfro (born 1940), American football and track and field athlete

== People with the surname ==
- Abigail Raye (born 1991), Canadian field hockey player
- Benjamin Raye, American singer-songwriter
- Carol Raye (1923–2022), British-born Australian singer and dancer
- Collin Raye (born 1960), American country music singer
- Don Raye (1909–1985), American vaudevillian and songwriter
- Helen Raye, British karateka at 1983 European Karate Championships
- Jimmy Raye II (born 1946), American football coach
- Jimmy Raye III, vice president of football operations for the Indianapolis Colts
- Joan Raye (1698–1737), Dutch governor of Surinam, husband of Charlotta Elisabeth van der Lith
- Julianna Raye, American songwriter
- Kevin Raye (born 1961), American politician
- Kimberly Raye, American author who writes mostly romance and paranormal fiction
- Martha Raye (1916–1994), American comic actress and singer
- Sol Raye (1946–2006), Guyanese cabaret singer
- Susan Raye, singer-pianist and host of The Susan Raye Show, 1950 American television show
- Susan Raye (born 1944), American country music singer
- Teddy Raye (born 1937), French singer, Rock-A-Beatin' Boogie

== Fictional characters ==
- Raye Hino, English dub name of Sailor Mars, anime character

== See also ==
- Ray (disambiguation)
- Reye (disambiguation)
- Raye-sur-Authie, a commune in Hauts-de-France, France
- Anse La Raye, a town in Saint Lucia
- Déversion de la Raye, a water feature on the Canal du Midi
- Vievy-le-Rayé, a commune in central France
- Club RaYé, cocktail bar and jazz club in Paris, France
