= Raai =

Raai is a given name and surname. Notable people with the name include:

- Raai Laxmi (born 1989), Indian film actress and model
- Seba Al-Raai (born 1982), road cyclist from Syria

== See also ==
- Rai (disambiguation)
