= 1788 =

1788 in various calendars
- Gregorian calendar: 1788; MDCCLXXXVIII
- Ab urbe condita: 2541
- Armenian calendar: 1237; ԹՎ ՌՄԼԷ
- Assyrian calendar: 6538
- Balinese saka calendar: 1709–1710
- Bengali calendar: 1194–1195
- Berber calendar: 2738
- British Regnal year: 28 Geo. 3 – 29 Geo. 3
- Buddhist calendar: 2332
- Burmese calendar: 1150
- Byzantine calendar: 7296–7297
- Chinese calendar: 丁未年 (Fire Goat); 4485 or 4278 — to — 戊申年 (Earth Monkey); 4486 or 4279
- Coptic calendar: 1504–1505
- Discordian calendar: 2954
- Ethiopian calendar: 1780–1781
- Hebrew calendar: 5548–5549
- Hindu calendars
- Vikram Samvat: 1844–1845
- Shaka Samvat: 1709–1710
- Kali Yuga: 4888–4889
- Holocene calendar: 11788
- Igbo calendar: 788–789
- Iranian calendar: 1166–1167
- Islamic calendar: 1202–1203
- Japanese calendar: Tenmei 8 (天明８年)
- Javanese calendar: 1714–1715
- Julian calendar: Gregorian minus 11 days
- Korean calendar: 4121
- Minguo calendar: 124 before ROC 民前124年
- Nanakshahi calendar: 320
- Thai solar calendar: 2330–2331
- Tibetan calendar: མེ་མོ་ལུག་ལོ་ (female Fire-Sheep); 1914 or 1533 or 761 — to — ས་ཕོ་སྤྲེ་ལོ་ (male Earth-Monkey); 1915 or 1534 or 762

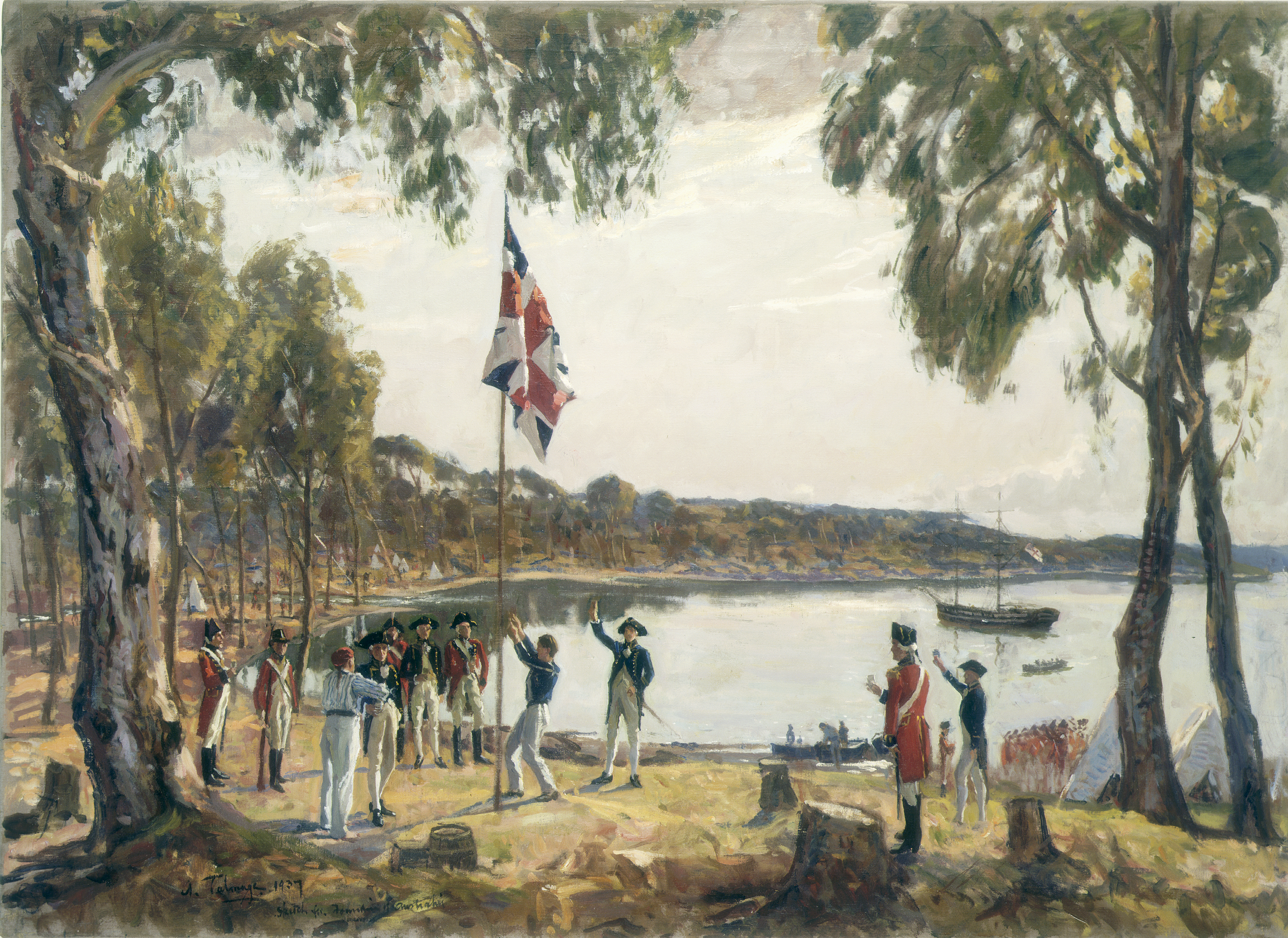
January 26: the Colony of New South Wales is established in what became Australia.

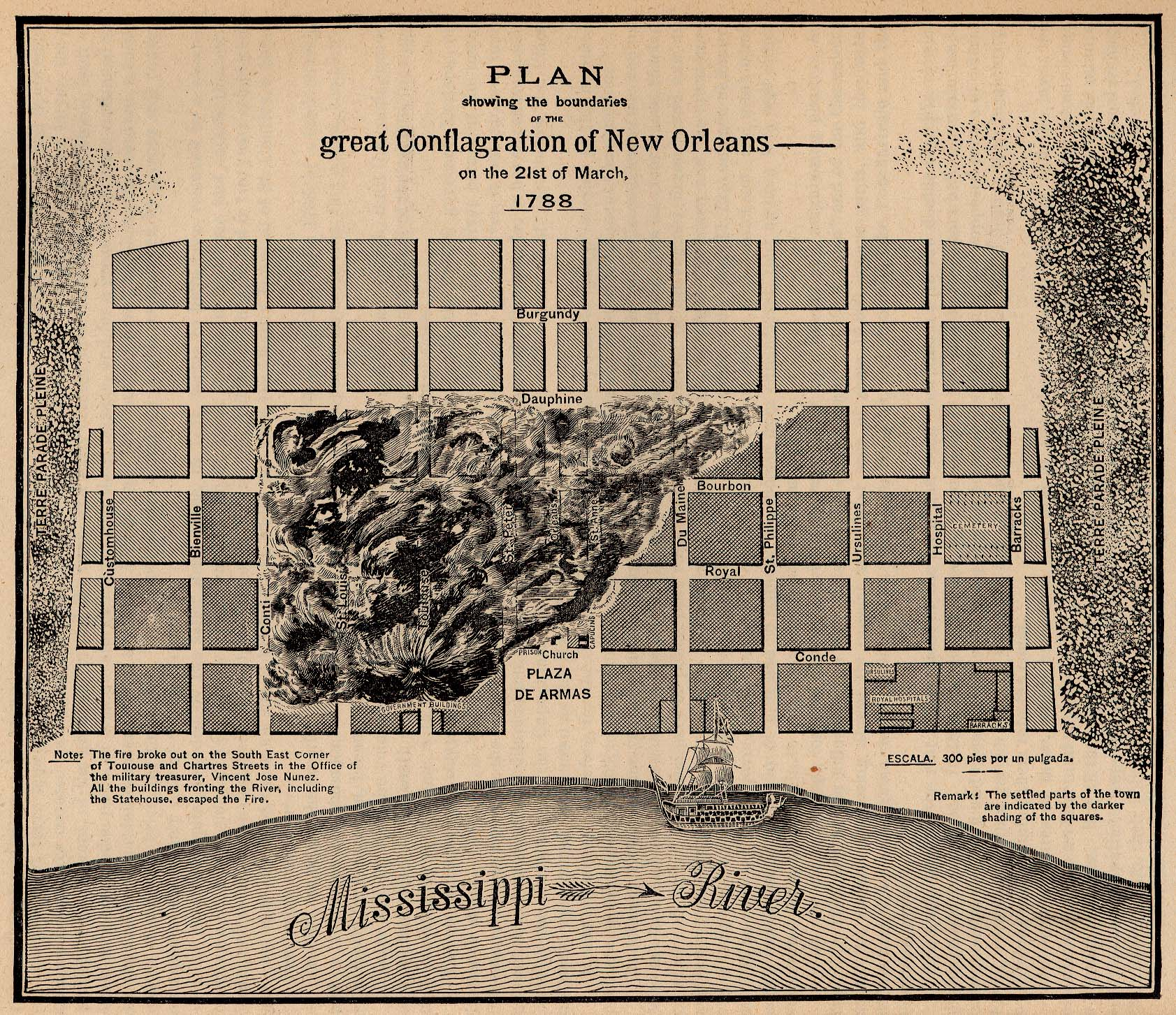
March 21: The Great New Orleans Fire leaves most of the town in ruins

1788 (MDCCLXXXVIII) was a leap year starting on Tuesday of the Gregorian calendar and a leap year starting on Saturday of the Julian calendar, the 1788th year of the Common Era (CE) and Anno Domini (AD) designations, the 788th year of the 2nd millennium, the 88th year of the 18th century, and the 9th year of the 1780s decade. As of the start of 1788, the Gregorian calendar was 11 days ahead of the Julian calendar, which remained in localized use until 1923.

== Events ==
=== January–March ===
- January 1 – The first edition of The Times, previously The Daily Universal Register, is published in London.
- January 2 – Georgia ratifies the United States Constitution, and becomes the fourth U.S. state under the new government.
- January 9 – Connecticut ratifies the United States Constitution, and becomes the fifth U.S. state.
- January 18 – The leading ship (armed tender HMS Supply) in Captain Arthur Phillip's First Fleet arrives at Botany Bay, to colonise Australia.
- January 22 – The Congress of the Confederation, effectively a caretaker government until the United States Constitution can be ratified by at least nine of the 13 states, elects Cyrus Griffin as its last president.
- January 24 – The La Perouse expedition in the Astrolabe and Boussole arrives off Botany Bay, just as Captain Arthur Phillip is attempting to move his colony from there to Sydney Cove in Port Jackson.
- January 26 – Eleven ships of the First Fleet from Botany Bay, led by Captain Arthur Phillip, land at Sydney Cove (which will become Sydney), Australia, where he determines to establish the British prison colony of New South Wales, the first permanent European settlement on the continent.
- January 31 – Henry Benedict Stuart becomes the new Stuart claimant to the throne of Great Britain, as King Henry IX and the figurehead of Jacobitism.
- February 1 – Isaac Briggs and William Longstreet patent a steamboat.
- February 6 – Massachusetts ratifies the United States Constitution, and becomes the sixth U.S. state.
- February 7 – Sydney is named and founded, in the British colony of New South Wales.
- February 9 – Austria enters the Russo-Turkish War (1787–92), and attacks Moldavia.
- February 17 – The uninhabited Lord Howe Island is discovered by the brig HMS Supply, commanded by Lieutenant Ball, who is on his way from Botany Bay to Norfolk Island with convicts to start a penal settlement there. They arrive at Norfolk Island on March 6.
- March 10 – The La Perouse expedition leaves Sydney Cove for New Caledonia, never to be seen again.
- March 14 – The Edinburgh Evening Courant carries a notice of £200 reward for the capture of William Brodie, a town councilor doubling as a burglar.
- March 21 – The Great New Orleans Fire destroys 856 buildings, including St. Louis Cathedral and The Cabildo, leaving most of the town in ruins.

=== April–June ===
- April 7 – American pioneers establish the town of Marietta (in modern-day Ohio), the first permanent American settlement outside the original Thirteen Colonies.
- April 13 – America's first recorded riot, the 'Doctors' Mob', begins. Residents of Manhattan are angry about grave robbers stealing bodies for doctors to dissect. The rioting is suppressed on April 15.
- April 28 – Maryland ratifies the United States Constitution, and becomes the seventh U.S. state.
- May 10 – The Royal Dramatic Theatre (Kungliga Dramatiska Teatern), Sweden's national drama company, is founded.
- May 15 – The Australian frontier wars begins. With the placement of a cournerstone.
- May 23 – South Carolina ratifies the United States Constitution, and becomes the eighth U.S. state.
- June 7 – France: Day of the Tiles, which some consider the beginning of the French Revolution.
- June 9 – The African Association, an exploration group dedicated to plotting the Niger River and finding Timbuktu, is founded in England.
- June 17 – English captains Thomas Gilbert and John Marshall, returning from Botany Bay, become the first Europeans to encounter the Gilbert Islands in the Pacific Ocean. They also chart islands in "Lord Mulgrove's range", later known as the Marshall Islands.
- June 21 – New Hampshire ratifies the United States Constitution, and becomes the ninth U.S. state, enabling the Constitution to go into effect. (The latter happens on March 4, 1789, when the first Congress elected under the new Constitution assembles.)
- June 25 – The Virginia Ratifying Convention ratifies the United States Constitution, and becomes the tenth U.S. state under the new government.
- June 26 – Wolfgang Amadeus Mozart, in Vienna, completes his antepenultimate symphony, the Symphony No. 39 in E-flat.
- June 27 – The Russo-Swedish War (1788–1790) breaks out following a staged attack on Swedish troops in Puumala, present-day Finland.

=== July–September ===
- July 13 – A hailstorm sweeps across France and the Dutch Republic, with hailstones 'as big as quart bottles' that take 'three days to melt'; immense damage is done.
- July 24 – Governor General Lord Dorchester, by proclamation issued from the Chateau St. Louis in Quebec City, divides the British Province of Quebec into five Districts, namely: Gaspé, Nassau, Lunenburg, Mecklenburg, and Hesse.
- July 26 – New York ratifies the United States Constitution, and becomes the eleventh U.S. state.
- July 28 – Wolfgang Amadeus Mozart, in Vienna, completes his penultimate symphony, the Symphony No. 40 in G Minor.
- August 8 – King Louis XVI agrees to convene the Estates-General meeting in May 1789, the first time since 1614.
- August 10 – Emperor Shah Alam II was blinded by a maddened Indo-Afghan commander Ghulam Qadir Rohilla who sought revenge against the Mughal Empire.
- August 10 – Wolfgang Amadeus Mozart, in Vienna, completes his final symphony, the Symphony No. 41 in C Major, and nicknamed (after his death) The Jupiter.
- August 12 – The Anjala conspiracy is signed.
- August 27 – The trial of Deacon William Brodie for burglary begins in Edinburgh, Scotland; he is sentenced to death by hanging.
- September 13 – The United States Congress of the Confederation passes an act providing a timeline for the voting for the first President under the new U.S. Constitution.
- September 21 – Austro-Turkish War - Battle of Karánsebes: The Austrian army engages in a friendly-fire incident, which results in mass casualties.
- September 24 – The Theater War begins, when the army of Denmark–Norway invades Sweden.

=== October–December ===
- October 1 – William Brodie is hanged at the Tolbooth in Edinburgh.
- October 21 – The 14th and last session of the Continental Congress and (the 6th as Congress under the Articles of Confederation) is adjourned.
- October – King George III of the United Kingdom becomes deranged; the Regency Crisis of 1788 starts.
- November 8 – Voting takes place in the 11 states that have ratified the United States Constitution for the first U.S. Senators; in Virginia, Richard Henry Lee and William Grayson, both anti-federalists, receive the highest number of votes in the Virginia Senate.
- November 15 – Cyrus Griffin of Virginia completes his service as the last President of the Congress of the Confederation, under the Articles of Confederation.
- November 20 – In the United Kingdom, the Houses of Parliament are given the first formal report by Prime Minister Pitt of the mental illness of King George III. Parliament adjourns for two weeks, to await the results of examinations by royal physicians.
- November 25 – Fifty consecutive days of temperatures below freezing strike France, a record that will be unbroken more than 200 years later.
- December 6 – Russo-Turkish War (1787–92): The Ottoman fortress of Ochakiv falls to the Russians after a prolonged siege, and a murderous storm with a temperature of −23 °C (−9 °F).
- December 14 – King Charles III of Spain dies, and is succeeded by his son Charles IV.
- December – Robert Burns writes his version of the Scots poem Auld Lang Syne.

=== Undated ===
- Annual British iron production reaches 68,000 tons.

== Births ==
- January 22 – George Gordon Byron, 6th Baron Byron, English poet (d. 1824)
- February 5 – Robert Peel, Prime Minister of the United Kingdom (d. 1850)
- February 10 – Johann Peter Pixis, German pianist, composer (d. 1874)
- February 12 – Carl Reichenbach, German chemist (d. 1869)

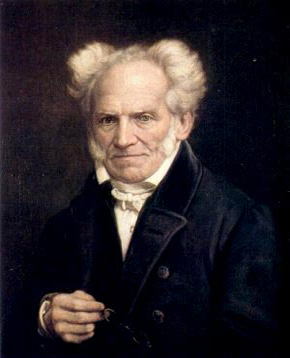
Arthur Schopenhauer

- February 22 – Arthur Schopenhauer, German philosopher (d. 1860)

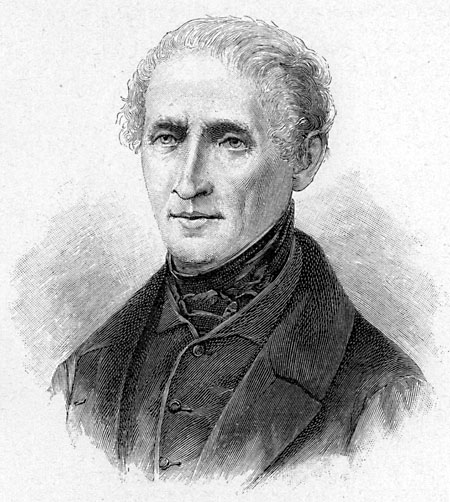
Joseph Eichendorff

- March 10 – Joseph von Eichendorff, German poet (d. 1857)
- April 2
  - Francisco Balagtas, Filipino poet (d. 1862)
  - Wilhelmine Reichard, first German woman balloonist (d. 1848)
- April 14 – David G. Burnet, President of the Republic of Texas (d. 1870)
- April 18 – Charlotte Murchison, Scottish geologist (d. 1869)

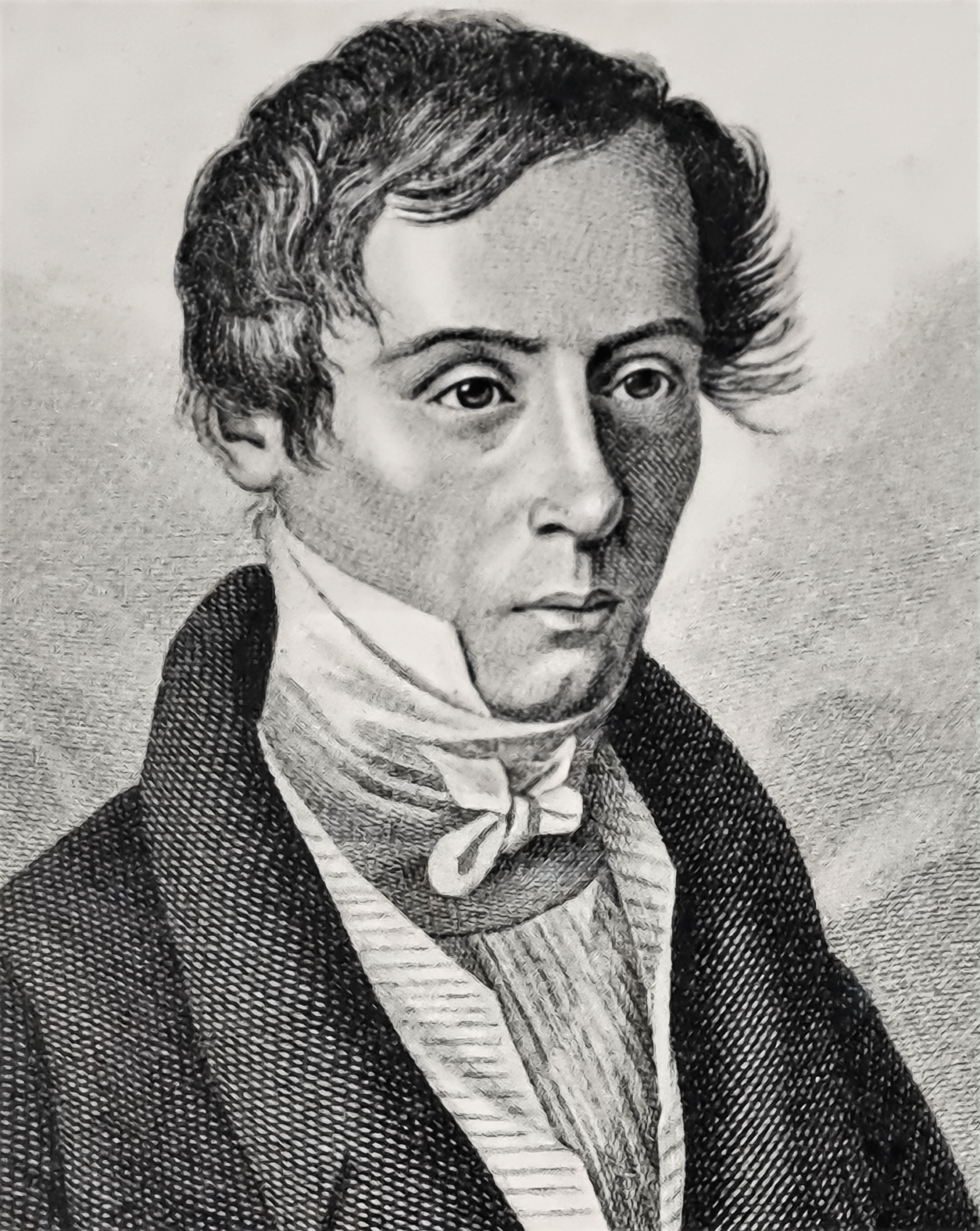
Augustin-Jean Fresnel

- May 10 – Augustin-Jean Fresnel, French engineer, physicist and inventor (d. 1827)
- May 16 – Friedrich Rückert, German poet, translator, and professor of Oriental languages (d. 1866)
- May 22 – William Grant Broughton, first Anglican bishop in Australia (d. 1853)
- June 8 – Charles A. Wickliffe, American politician, 14th Governor of Kentucky (d. 1869)
- June 21 – Princess Augusta of Bavaria, Duchess of Leuchtenberg (d. 1851)
- July 30 – Kisamor, Swedish natural healer (d. 1842)
- August 2 – Leopold Gmelin, German chemist (d. 1853)
- August 6 – Felix Slade, English lawyer, philanthropist and art collector (d. 1868)
- August 7 – Francis R. Shunk, American politician (d. 1848)
- August 15 – Carel Sirardus Willem van Hogendorp, Acting Governor-General of the Dutch East Indies (d. 1856)
- August 16 – Luigi Ciacchi, Italian cardinal (d. 1865)
- September 12 – Alexander Campbell, Irish-born founder of the Disciples of Christ (d. 1866)
- September 15 – Gerard C. Brandon, American politician (d. 1850)
- September 12 – Charlotte von Siebold, German gynecologist (d. 1859)
- September 21
  - Geert Adriaans Boomgaard, Dutch citizen, first validated supercentenarian (d. 1899)
  - Margaret Taylor, First Lady of the United States (d. 1852)
- September 22
  - Theodore Edward Hook, English author (d. 1841)
  - Louis-Étienne Saint-Denis, Arab-French memoir writer and servant to Napoleon I (d. 1856)
- September 28 – Jakob Walter, German stonemason, soldier (d. 1864)
- October 9 – József Kossics, Hungarian-Slovene Catholic priest, writer, ethnologist (d. 1867)
- October 11 – Simon Sechter, Austrian music teacher (d. 1867)
- October 24 – Sarah Josepha Hale, American author (d. 1879)
- October 31 – David R. Porter, American politician (d. 1867)
- November 8 – Mihály Bertalanits, Hungarian Slovene (Prekmurje Slovene) poet, teacher (d. 1853)
- Date unknown
  - Facundo Quiroga, Argentine federationalist (d. 1835)
  - Ana Joaquina dos Santos e Silva, African businesswoman (d. 1859)

== Deaths ==
- January 14 – François Joseph Paul, marquis de Grasetilly, comte de Grasse, French admiral (b. 1722)
- January 31 – Charles Edward Stuart, claimant to the British throne (b. 1720)
- February 17 – Maurice Quentin de La Tour, French portrait painter (b. 1704)
- February 18 – John Whitehurst, English clockmaker, scientist (b. 1713)
- February 21 – Johann Georg Palitzsch, German astronomer (b. 1723)
- February 28 – Thomas Cushing, American Continental Congressman (b. 1725)
- March 2 – Salomon Gessner, Swiss painter and newspaper publisher (b. 1730)
- March 29 – Charles Wesley, English co-founder (with his brother, John Wesley) of the religious movement known as Methodism (b. 1707)
- March 31 – Catharina Elisabet Grubb, Finnish industrialist (b. 1721)
- April 12 – Carlo Antonio Campioni, French-born composer (b. 1719)
- April 15 – Giuseppe Bonno, Austrian composer (b. 1711)
- April 16 – Georges-Louis Leclerc, Comte de Buffon, French naturalist (b. 1707)
- May 8 – Giovanni Antonio Scopoli, Italian-born physician, naturalist (b. 1723)
- May 11 – Dorothea Biehl, Danish writer (b. 1731)
- June 14 – Adam Gib, Scottish religious leader (b. 1714)
- June 21 – Johann Georg Hamann, German philosopher (b. 1730)
- July 3 – François Jacquier, French Franciscan mathematician, physicist (b. 1711)
- July 30 – Kajetan Sołtyk, Polish Catholic priest (b. 1715)

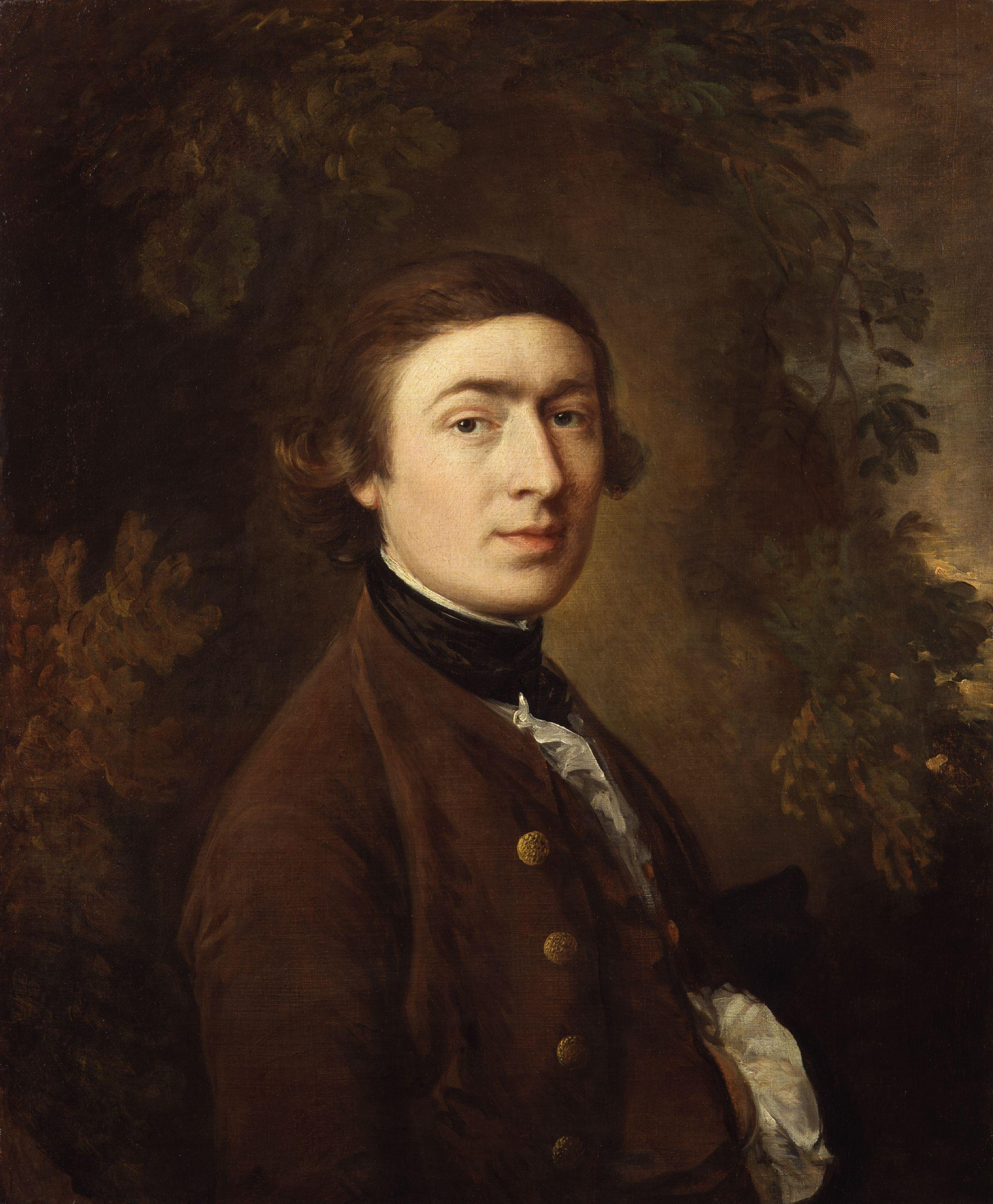
Thomas Gainsborough

- August 2 – Thomas Gainsborough, British painter (b. 1727)
- August 8 – Armand de Vignerot du Plessis, French soldier, diplomat and statesman (b. 1696)
- August 25 – Tanuma Okitsugu, Japanese government official (b. 1719)
- August 28 – Elizabeth Pierrepont, Duchess of Kingston-upon-Hull, English noble (b. 1721)
- September 25 – Thomas Missing, English politician (b. 1710)
- October 13 – Robert Nugent, 1st Earl Nugent, Irish politician, poet (b. 1709)
- October 15 – Samuel Greig, Scottish-Russian Admiral (b. 1736)
- November 14 – Thomas Estcourt Cresswell, British politician (b. 1712)
- November 20 – Samuel Martin (Secretary to the Treasury), British politician (b. 1714)
- November 23 – Infante Gabriel of Spain (b. 1752)
- December 6 – Jonathan Shipley, English bishop, politician (b. 1714)
  - Nicole-Reine Lepaute, French astronomer (b. 1723)

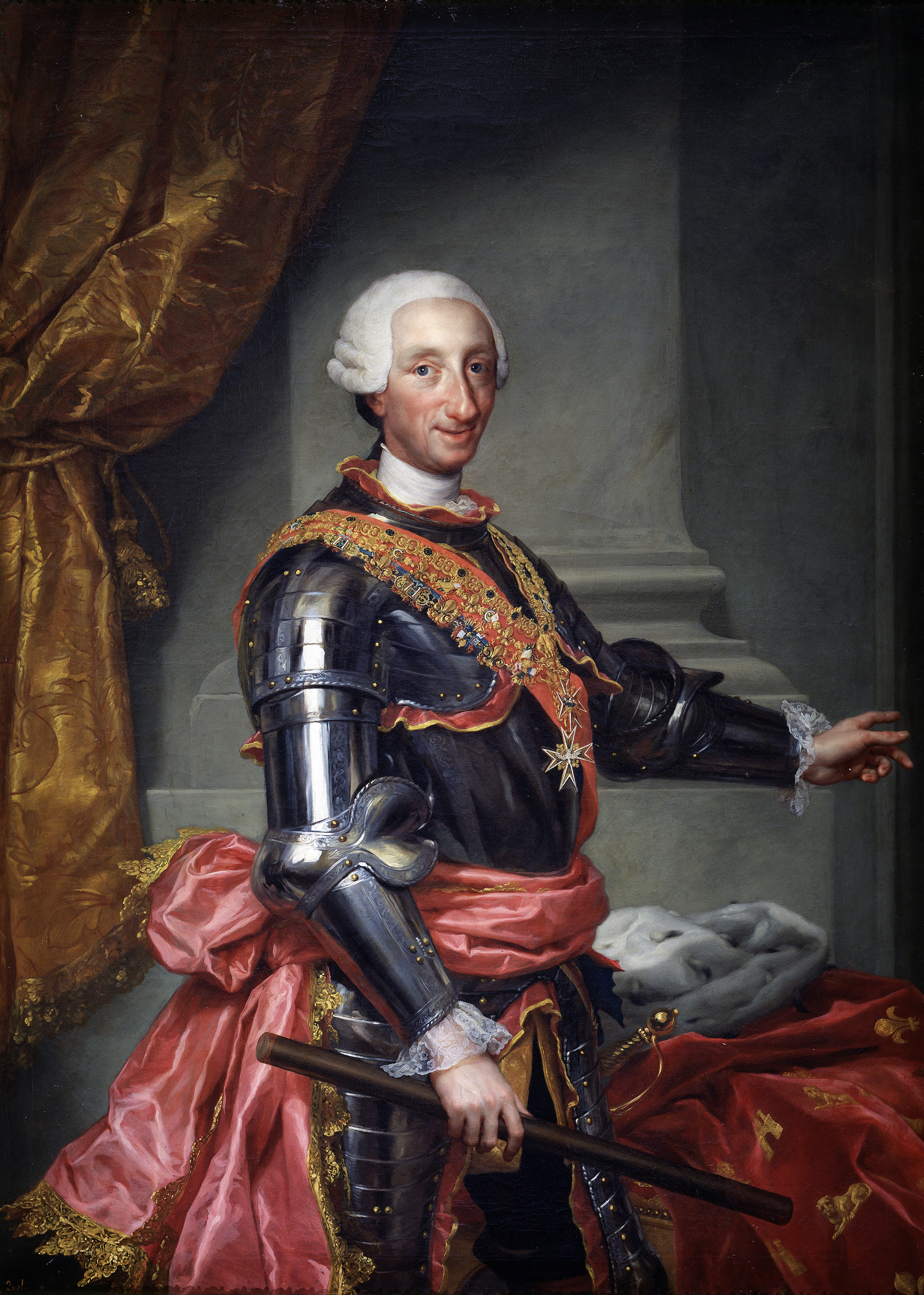
Charles III of Spain

- December 14
  - Carl Philipp Emanuel Bach, German composer (b. 1714)
  - King Charles III of Spain (b. 1716)
- December 19 – Juan Bautista de Anza, Governor of the Spanish Province of New Mexico (b. 1736)
- December 22 – Percivall Pott, English surgeon (b. 1714)
- December 30 – Francesco Zuccarelli, Italian painter, elected to the Venetian Academy (b. 1702)
- Date unknown
  - Lucia Galeazzi Galvani, Italian scientist (b. 1743)
  - Martha Wray, English businesswoman and medical manufacturer (b. 1739)
