= Radius (disambiguation) =

A radius is a straight line or distance from the center to the edge of a curve.

Radius may also refer to:

== People ==
- Alexandra Radius (born 1942), Dutch ballerina
- Justus Radius (1797–1884), German pathologist and ophthalmologist
- Radius Prawiro (1928–2005), Indonesian economist and politician

== Arts, entertainment, and media ==
=== Fictional entities ===
- Radius (Chrono Cross), a character in Chrono Cross
- Radius (comics), a superhero in the Marvel Comics universe
- Radius (R.U.R.), a character in Karel Čapek's science fiction play R.U.R.

=== Film ===
- Radius (film), a 2017 Canadian film directed by Caroline Labrèche and Steeve Léonard

=== Music ===
- Radius (music ensemble), a London music ensemble founded by Tim Benjamin

== Companies ==
- Radius Inc., a defunct computer hardware company
- Radius Intelligence, a defunct enterprise software company
- Radius Payment Solutions, a payment and fleet services technology and software company
- Radius Travel, a travel management company

== Mathematics ==
- Radius (graph theory), the minimum distance from a graph's node to the node that is furthest from it
- Radius of convergence (in calculus), the radius of the region where a complex power series converges
- Radius of curvature, a measure of how gently a curve bends
- Radius of gyration, the root-mean-square distance from a set of points or masses to a given center
- The radial coordinate in a
  - Polar coordinate system (2D)
  - Cylindrical coordinate system (3D)
  - Spherical coordinate system (3D)
- The inradius or circumradius of a shape

== Science and technology ==
- Radius (bone), one of the two bones in a forearm
- Bend radius, the minimum radius to which one can bend a pipe, tube, sheet, cable, or hose without damage
- RADIUS (Remote Authentication Dial In User Service), a network authentication protocol
- Turning radius, the minimum radius at which a vehicle can negotiate a turn
