= Josip Grabovac =

Croatian fashion journalist

- Born: October 12, 1985 (age 41); Mostar, Bosnia and Herzegovina
- Occupation: Fashion journalist

Josip Grabovac (born 12 October 1985) is a Croatian fashion journalist based in Milan, Italy. He founded GLAS MODE, a fashion magazine, and later the Milan Fashion Department, an initiative intended to provide emerging designers with access to the Milan fashion industry.

== Early life ==
Grabovac was born in Mostar, Bosnia and Herzegovina. Before pursuing fashion and becoming involved in fashion blogging, journalism and scouting, he worked as a bartender.

== Career ==
Grabovac moved to Milan, where he pursued a career in fashion journalism. He became a regular participant in the Italian fashion industry and attended Milan Fashion Week, where he attracted attention for his own styling. He was the first journalist from the Balkan region to be accredited at the event.

By the late 2010s, he was receiving attention in the Balkans and Italy for his fashion work. He described working in Milan's fashion industry as fulfilling a long-term career goal. In 2019 he attended Belgrade Fashion Week as a guest of honour. He went to Dubai to attend fashion events and to receive an award in 2021.

His work and career have been covered by Croatian and regional media including ‘‘Forbes Hrvatska’’, ‘‘Večernji list’’, ‘‘Jutarnji list’’, RTL and other publications.

Since 2023 he has been an ambassador for the Ultra Europe music festival. In 2025, he launched Milan Fashion Department to help up and coming Balkans break into the fashion industry. In 2026, he again participated in Milan Fashion Week while serving in the journalists' jury at the Sanremo Music Festival following an invitation from RAI, the Italian broadcaster.

In 2026, he launched a limited edition collection "JOAN by Josip Grabovac – BLANC" which sold out. This was a collaboration with the fashion brand JOAN, beginning with his first authorial fashion design collection. The project was a transition from playing behind-the-scenes roles into designing under his own name.

== Awards and recognition ==
Grabovac received the ‘‘Večernjakov Pečat’’ award in Bosnia and Herzegovina in 2019.
