= Christopher Wray =

Christopher Wray may refer to:

- Christopher Wray (English judge) (1524–1592), English judge
- Christopher Wray (MP) (1601–1646), English politician
- Sir Christopher Wray, 4th Baronet (1621–1664), of the Wray baronets
- Sir Christopher Wray, 6th Baronet (1652–1679), MP
- Christopher Wray (actor) (1940–2014), actor, proprietor of the Christopher Wray Lighting Emporium shop in London
- Christopher A. Wray (born 1966), American lawyer, Director of the Federal Bureau of Investigation (FBI)

== See also ==
- Wray (disambiguation)
- Wray (surname)
- Christopher Ray (disambiguation)
