= Kein =

Kein or KEIN may refer to:

- Kein language, a language of Papua New Guinea
- Kein (EP), a 2007 EP by Japanese metal band Unsraw
- KEIN, an American radio station

== People with the name ==
- Sybil Kein (1939–2022), American poet
- Kein Cross, American fashion designer
- Kein Einaste (born 1985), Estonian skier

== See also ==
- Kain (disambiguation)
