= Wray =

Wray or WRAY may refer to:

== Places ==
- Wray, Colorado, United States
- Wray, Georgia, United States
- Wray, Lancashire, a village of Lancashire, England, United Kingdom
- Wray-with-Botton, Lancashire, England, United Kingdom
- Wray 17-96, a star in the constellation Scorpius
- Wray Home, the residence around which Flamingo Gardens was founded

== Businesses ==
- J. Wray and Nephew Ltd., a subsidiary of the Campari Group, Jamaica
- Wray (lenses), a former British camera and lens manufacturer
- WRAY (AM), an AM radio station licensed to Princeton, Indiana, United States
- WRAY-FM, an FM radio station licensed to Princeton, Indiana, United States
- WRAY-TV, a television station licensed to Wilson, North Carolina, United States
- WRAY-TV (Indiana), a former television station licensed to Princeton, Indiana, United States

== People ==
- Wray (surname)
- Wray baronets, two baronetcies in the Baronetage of England, United Kingdom
- Diane Wray Williams, American politician, businesswoman, and teacher
- Fay Wray, Canadian-American actress
- Wray Carlton (born 1937), American professional football player
- Wray Delaney, British writer and illustrator
- Wray Downes (1931–2020), Canadian jazz pianist
- Wray Physioc (1890–1933), American film director, producer and artist
- Wray "Nik" Stuart (1927–2002), British gymnast
- Wray Thomas (1810–1883), American politician

== Other ==
- Wray baronets, two extinct titles in the Baronetage of England, United Kingdom
- Wray Castle, Cumbria, England, United Kingdom
- Wray (month), the first month of the Afghan calendar
- The Wrays, an American country music group
- 19721 Wray, an asteroid

== See also ==
- Wrey (disambiguation)
- Ray (disambiguation)
