= Christopher Ray =

Christopher Ray may refer to:

- Chris Ray (born 1982), American baseball pitcher
- Chris Ray (ice hockey), American ice hockey forward
- Christopher Ray, director of Almighty Thor and Mercenaries

== See also ==
- Christopher Wray (disambiguation)
