= Ultra Europe =

Outdoor electronic music festival

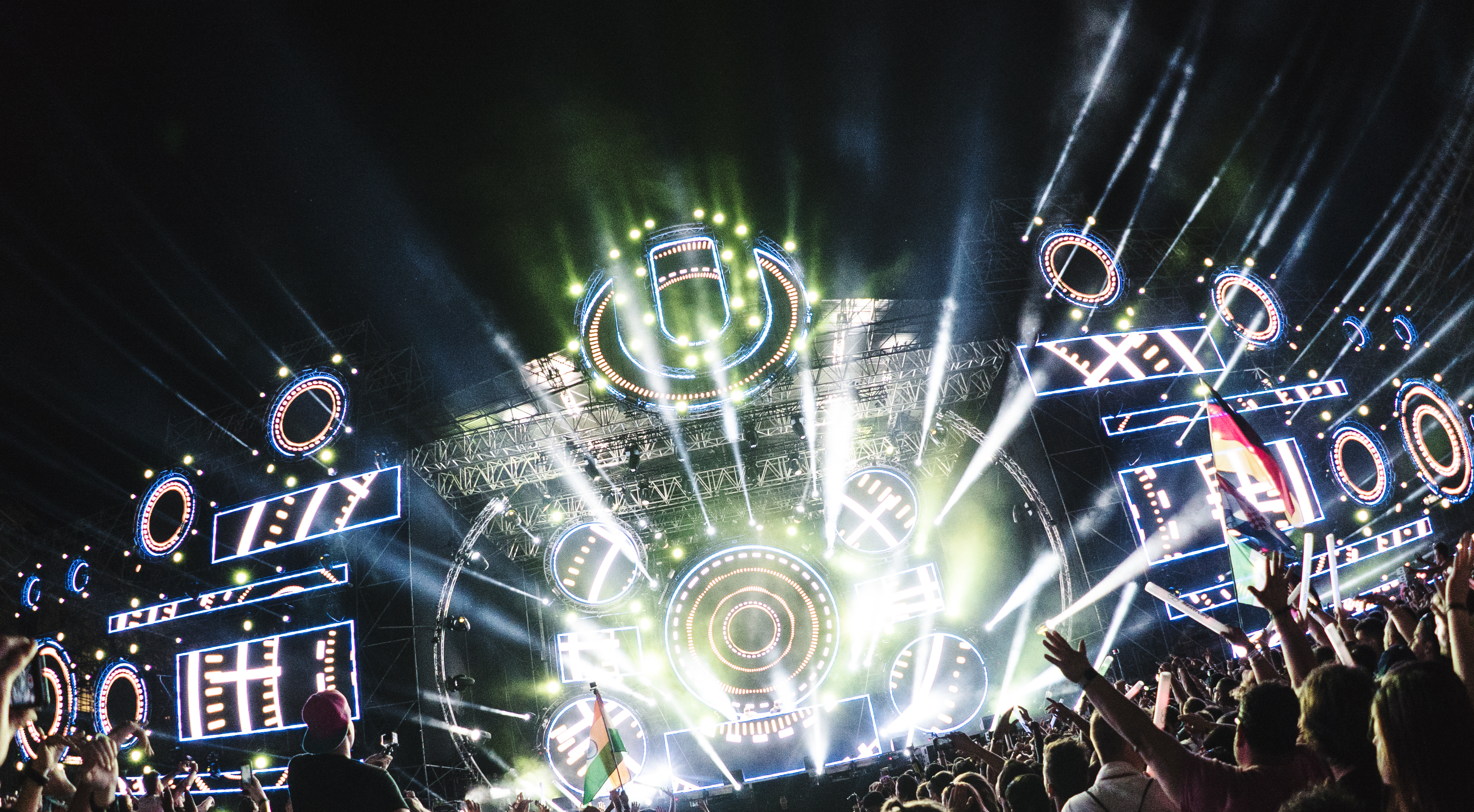
- Ultra Europe Festival, in Split, 2016
- Genre: Electronic music festival
- Date: July
- Venue: Poljud Stadium (2013–2018); Park Mladeži (2019 - ongoing)
- Locations: Split, Croatia; Hvar, Croatia; Brač, Croatia; Vis, Croatia
- Years active: 2013 - present
- Founder: Joe Bašić
- Attendance: 150,000 (2024)
- Organizer: Ultra Worldwide

Ultra Europe is an outdoor electronic music festival based in multiple cities throughout Croatia. It is the European expansion of the American Ultra Music Festival, debuting from 12–14 July 2013, largely in Split and the island of Hvar. Two years later, the festival became a part of Destination Ultra in Dalmatia, which includes a multi-day festival and yacht regatta.

The music festival is part of the broader tourism sector of Croatia and is considered "strategically important" by the Ministry of Tourism. Croatian-Canadian entrepreneur Joe Bašić has organized the festival since its founding. Ultra Europe has had a "statistically significant effect" on the local Dalmatian economy since the 2010s.

== History ==
=== 2013 ===
The debut of Ultra Europe took place during the first two days, 12–13 July and featured two stages in Split, Croatia at the Poljud Stadium—Main Stage and the Carl Cox & Friends Arena. Following that, the Ultra Beach party took place on the island of Hvar, Croatia at the Hotel Amfora Grand Beach Resort on 14 July.

Artists on the bill for Ultra Europe's debut in Split were Adventure Club, Sunnery James & Ryan Marciano, Arty, Sander van Doorn, Porter Robinson, Knife Party, Fedde Le Grand, Avicii, Art Department, UMEK, Adam Beyer, Luciano, Carl Cox, Krewella, Afrojack, Armin van Buuren, Hardwell, and many more. The Ultra Beach party in Hvar, Croatia welcomed Steve Aoki, Nervo, Erick Morillo, Dada Life, and Brass Knuckles. Ultra Europe's debut drew an attendance of about 103,000 people from all over the world.

=== 2014 ===
For the following year, Ultra Europe expanded into a three-day festival, taking place during 11–13 July 2014 in Split, Croatia at the Poljud Stadium. Following Ultra Europe was the Ultra Beach party on 14 July, which was once again held at the Hotel Amfora Grand Beach Resort on the island of Hvar, Croatia.

The second edition of Ultra Europe featured three stages at the Poljud Stadium in Split, Croatia including the Main Stage, the Ultra Worldwide Arena, and the UMF Radio Stage. The 2014 festival featured the likes of The Chainsmokers, Martin Garrix, Hardwell, Kill The Noise, Erick Morillo, Alesso, Deorro, Showtek, twoloud, Danny Avila, Vicetone, Knife Party, Above & Beyond, Cosmic Gate, Marlo, Ørjan Nilsen, Sunnery James & Ryan Marciano, Nicky Romero, Paul Kalkbrenner, Pretty Lights, Danilo Orsini, Fedde Le Grand, Jewelz and Sparks, Mayavanya, Steve Aoki, Disclosure, Hot Since 82, Kryoman, Armin van Buuren, David Guetta, Sebastian Ingrosso, Laidback Luke, DJ Snake, Carl Cox, Blasterjaxx, Marco Carola, Nic Fanciulli, Andrew Rayel, Jochen Miller, Barks, RiotGear, Tiesto, Afrojack, Paul van Dyk, W&W, Aly & Fila, and many more.

The second edition of Ultra Beach in Hvar, Croatia featured headlining artists—Dillon Francis, Diplo, and Afrojack. Supporting acts included Goldfish, Justin Oh, and Golddiggers. Ultra Europe and Ultra Beach drew in a total of 150,000 people to Split and Hvar, Croatia for its second edition.

=== 2015 ===
The third edition of Ultra Europe, included in what is now known as Destination Ultra grew immensely, spanning seven days at venues across Croatia. This weeklong adventure took place from 9–15 July 2015.

Croatia Music Week kicked off with the opening party in Split, Croatia at the Giraffe Palm Beach House and featured Cocoon label head Sven Väth, along with Christian Burkhardt and Maurizo Schmitz.

The festival, Ultra Europe, took place once again in Split, Croatia at the Poljud Stadium during 10–12 July 2015. Ultra Europe's third edition featured three stages—Main Stage, Megastructure, the Resistance Afterburner powered by Arcadia Spectacular, and the UMF Radio Stage. Featured artists who played the third edition of Ultra Europe included The Chainsmokers, Galantis, Alesso, the Chemical Brothers, Wilkinson, Solomun, Matador, UMEK, Martin Garrix, Zedd, Armin van Buuren, Carl Cox, Apollonia, W&W, Afrojack, Steve Angello, Hardwell, Jamie Jones, and many more.

The following day began the array of after parties—starting off with a yacht regatta in Bol on the island of Brač, Croatia.

Ultra Beach took place for the third consecutive year at the Hotel Amfora Grand Beach Resort in Split, Croatia on the following day. The lineup for that included Fedde Le Grand, Oliver Heldens, Sunnery James & Ryan Marciano, Moguai, and Jewelz & Sparks.

The final day of Croatia Music Week was a Resistance closing party located at Fort George in Vis, Croatia and featured Nic Fanciulli and Joris Voorn.

=== 2016 ===
The following edition of Destination Ultra – Ultra Europe took place during the week of 14–20 July 2016 across Croatia in venues throughout Split, Brač, Hvar, and Vis.

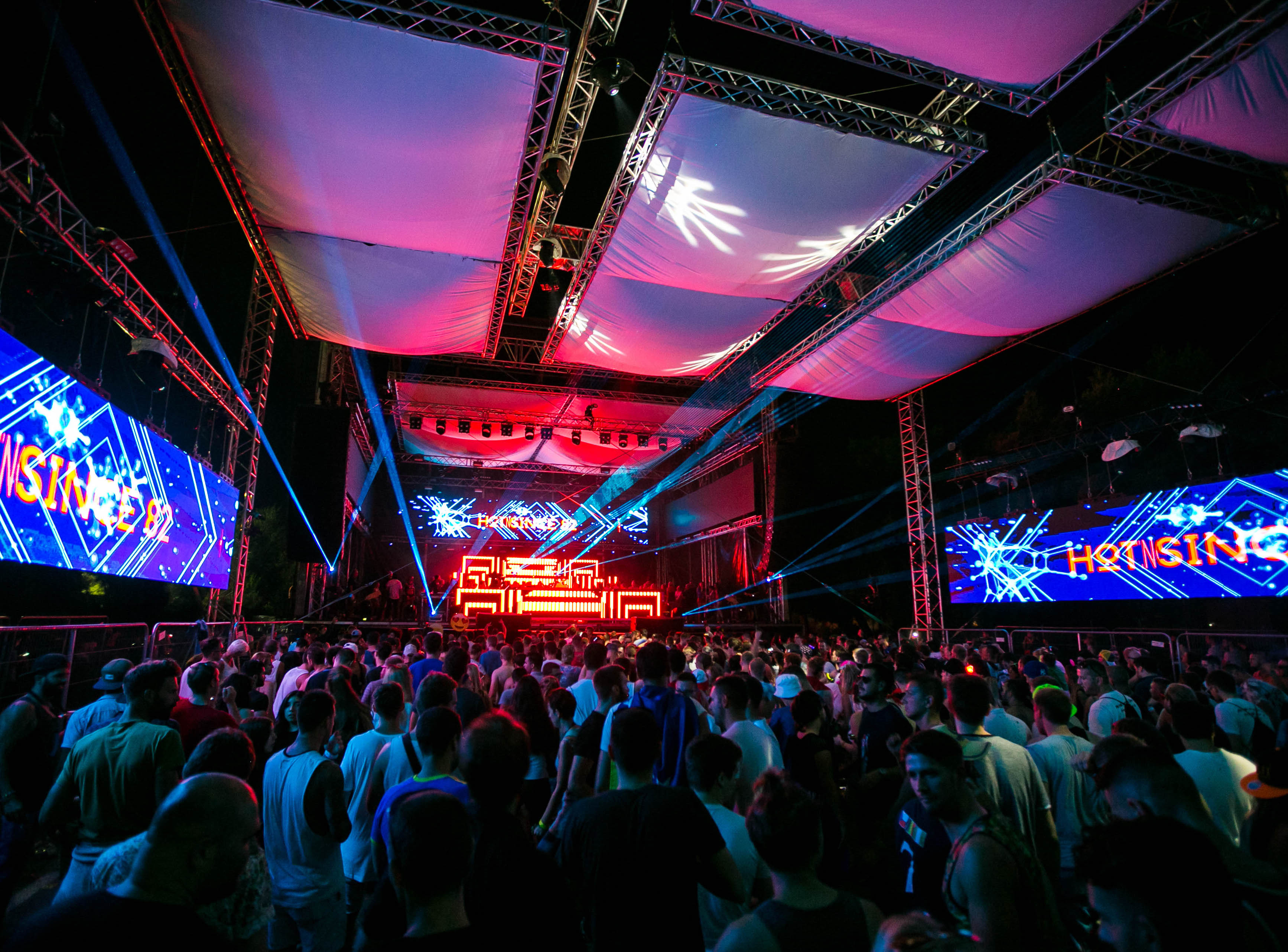
Resistance stage at Ultra Europe, 2016

The opening party once again took place at the Giraffe Palm Beach House on Thursday 14 July and featured UMEK along with guests from his label, 1605 Music Therapy—which included Mark Knight, Uner, and Dosem as well.

Ultra Europe took place the following three days—15–17 July 2016 and included four stages—Main Stage, Resistance, Arcadia Afterburner, and the UMF Radio Stage. The final lineup was announced on 6 July 2016 and included Above & Beyond, Afrojack (ft. MC Ambush), Armin van Buuren, Carl Cox, deadmau5, Jamie Jones, Nero, Solomun, Apollonia, Dash Berlin, Markus Schulz, David Guetta, Hot Since 82, Hardwell, Ferry Corsten presents Gouryella, Thomas Jack, Rødhåd, and many more. With the Friday cancelled due to extremely adverse weather conditions, Ultra surprised attendees on Saturday by opening at 1pm with Armin van Buuren, Above & Beyond and Fedde Le Grand playing early sets to kick off a record-breaking 16-hour extravaganza.

After Ultra Europe concluded, Destination Ultra continued with three more days of events. The yacht regatta took place on the island of Brač, Croatia on 18 July.

Ultra Beach also continued at its original venue, the Hotel Amfora Grand Beach Resort for its fourth year running on 19 July. The lineup for Ultra Beach featured the likes of Sam Feldt, Jauz, Don Diablo, and Robin Schulz.

The 2016 edition of Destination Ultra concluded at Fort George on the island of Vis, Croatia on 20 July with a closing party hosted by Resistance, featuring Hot Since 82 and Nic Fanciulli.

=== 2017 ===
The 5th edition of Ultra Europe was announced to take place during 14–16 July 2017. Early bird tickets went on sale on 27 October 2016, and the following tier of tickets were available by 28 October 2016. On its standard weekend schedule acts like the No. 1 DJ of the World Martin Garrix, Hardwell, Afrojack, Armin van Buuren and returnees to Ultra like Showtek, SHRKTOPS, and Nicky Romero were top names to play on the mainstage. The festival had 3 support stages such as the Resistance stage which served Techno music with Carl Cox, Marco Carola and Joseph Capriati as main acts. The Arcadia Stage was host to the shows of Revealed Recordings and Jacked Records. The UMF Radio stage transmitted live music to Ultra's official radio station for everybody in the world who couldn't attend the festival. On 17 July the official Instagram account of Ultra Europe announced the date for next years edition which is set for 6–8 July in 2018.

On 18 July Ultra Beach also celebrated its 5th annual consist on the Island of Hvar with Dash Berlin as main act. Support acts were Vini Vici, Showtek, Sunnery James & Ryan Marciano as well as Vicetone.

=== 2018 ===
The 6th edition of Ultra Europe took place on 6–8 July 2018 with the entirety of Destination Ultra taking place on 5–11 July. Tickets for the event went on sale the previous September. On 24 January 2018, Ultra Europe announced phase 1 of the lineup which includes Afrojack (ft. MC Ambush), Alesso, Armin van Buuren, Axwell Λ Ingrosso, Carl Cox, The Chainsmokers, David Guetta, DJ Snake, Eric Prydz, Galantis, Hardwell, Marco Carola, Marshmello and Steve Angello.

=== 2019 ===
The 7th edition of Ultra Europe took place on 12–14 July 2019. Headline acts included Above & Beyond, Adam Beyer, Afrojack (ft. MC Ambush), Alesso, Armin Van Buuren, Carl Cox, The Chainsmokers, David Guetta, DJ Snake, Dubfire, Gud Vibrations (Nghtmre + Slander), Jamie Jones, Jeffrey Sutorius, Joseph Capriati, Maceo Plex, Marco Carola, No Redemption (Tchami + Malaa), Rezz, Richie Hawtin, Sasha + Nic Fanciulli, Steve Aoki and Swedish House Mafia.

=== 2020 ===
Due to the COVID-19 pandemic, the 8th edition of Ultra Europe has been rescheduled. Instead of taking place from 10–12 July 2020, it was planned to take place from 9–11 July 2021.

=== 2021 ===
Due to the COVID-19 pandemic, the 9th edition of Ultra Europe has been rescheduled. Instead of taking place from 9–11 July 2021, it was planned to take place from 8–10 July 2022.

=== 2022 ===
The 10th edition of Ultra Europe took place on 8–10 July 2022.Headline acts included Above & Beyond, Adam Beyer, Afrojack (ft. MC Ambush), Alesso, Armin Van Buuren, Marshmello, DJ Snake, Martin Garrix, Tiësto, Steve Aoki, Timmy Trumpet, Nicki Romero, Sam Feldt, Nina Kraviz, Sofi Tukker and others. In the sequel, Ultra Europe moved to the islands: 11 July – Brač Regatta at 585 Club, Bol, Brač 12 July – ULTRA Beach at Carpe Diem Beach Club, Pakleni Islands, Hvar. 12 July – RESISTANCE Hvar at Carpe Diem Beach Club, Pakleni Islands, Hvar.The sensation of the 8 edition of Ultra Europe was the return of Hardwell, who returned to the scene after a 4-year break.

=== 2023 ===
The 11th edition of the festival took place 7–9 July 2023 at Park Mladeži in Split, Croatia and it included dozens of DJs, including the following on the main stage: Alesso, Afrojack, Axwell, DJ Snake, Gryffin, Oliver Heldens, Martin Garrix, Steve Aoki, Tchami, Timmy Trumpet, Zedd, W&W, Mykris, Plastik Funk.

=== 2024 ===
12th edition started with opening in Park mladeži ("Youth Park") in Split on 12 July 2024 and continued on Brač, Hvar and Vis. Among 150 performers, most prominent were Adam Beyer, Afrojack, Alison Wonderland, Armin van Buuren, Axwell, Boris Brejcha, Camelphat, Deborah de Luca, DJ Snake, Eric Prydz, Hardwell, Sebastian Ingrosso, Mar+In Garrix, Vini Vici, Vintage Culture etc. The ambassador for Europe in 2024 was Josip Grabovac. Around 150,000 people visited three-day programme in Split.

=== 2025 ===
Ultra Europe is scheduled for its 13th edition 11 to 13 July 2025.

== Accommodations ==
There are many options for Destination Ultra and Ultra Europe attendees to take advantage of in lieu of accommodations. Specifically for Ultra Europe, attendees can book a stay at the Beachville Campsite, where over 4,000 people stayed at last year. The Beachville Campsite gives attendees the option of camping with friends in a tent or mobile home—also giving attendees the chance to attend the exclusive Beachville pre-party.

Other accommodations for Destination Ultra and Ultra Europe include hotels, apartments, hostels, and rooms available for rent. Ultra Europe also collaborates with The Yacht Week to offer a special edition of the sailing trip with access to the festival.

== Gallery ==
Ultra Europe 2015

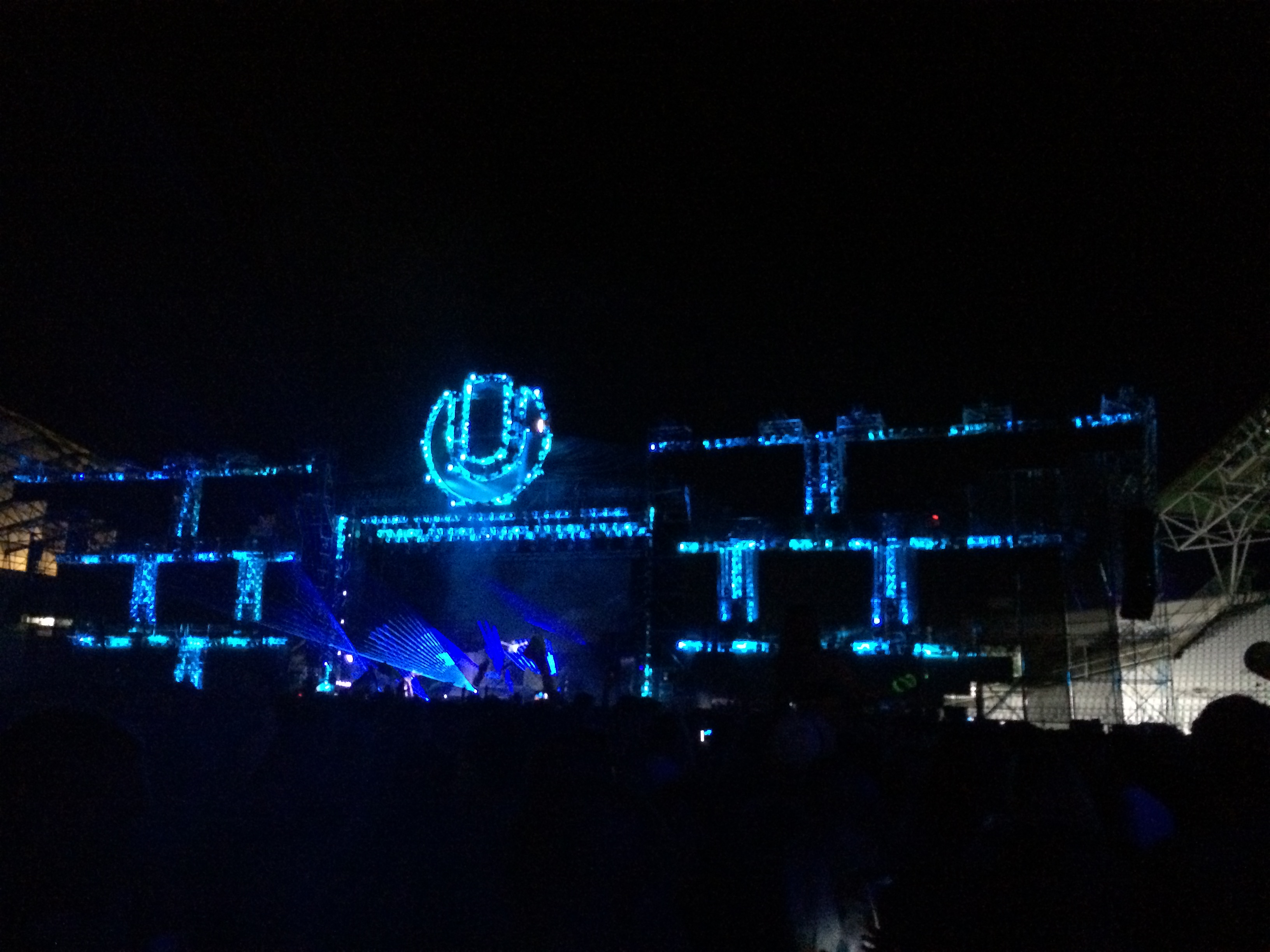

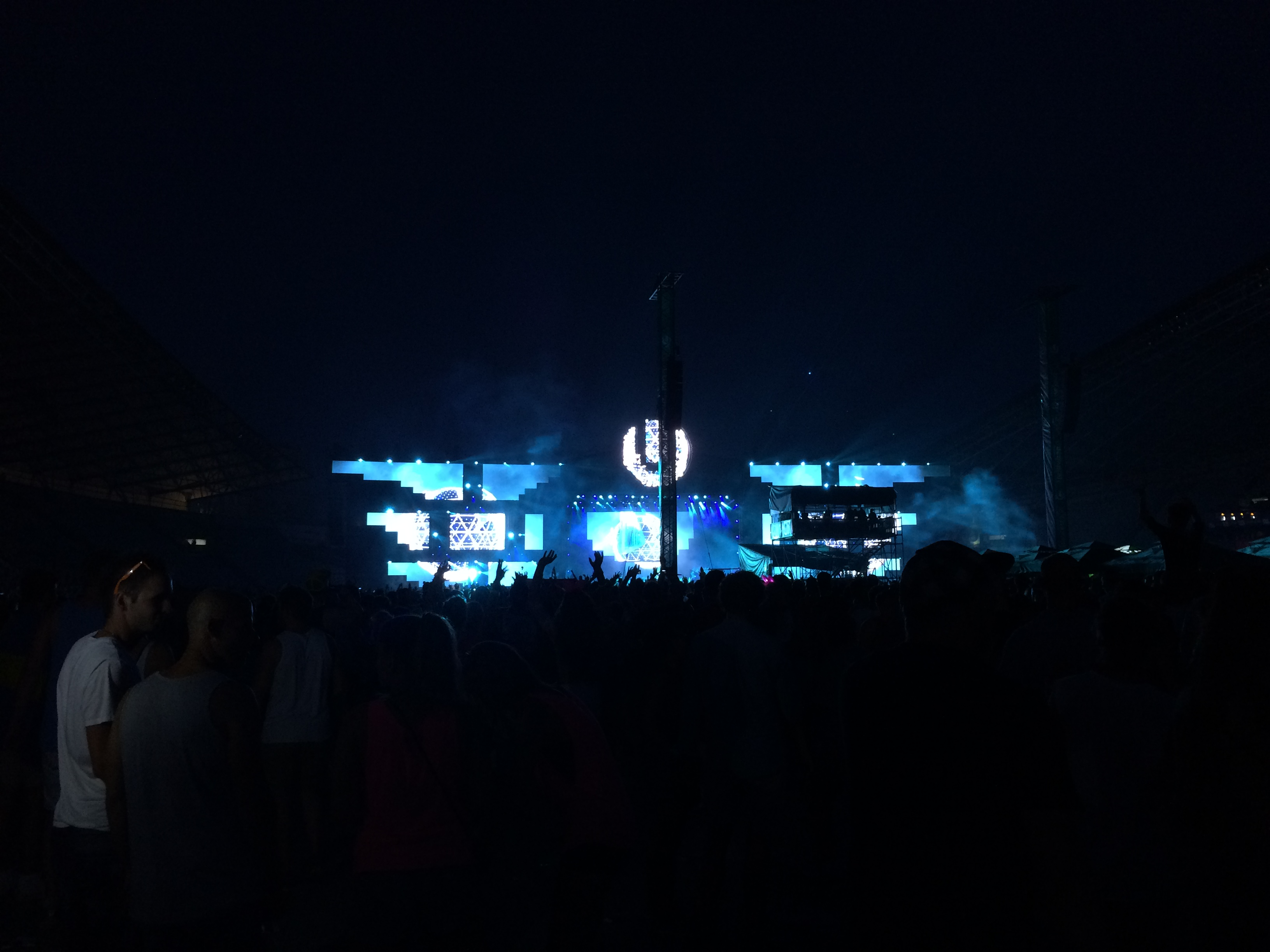

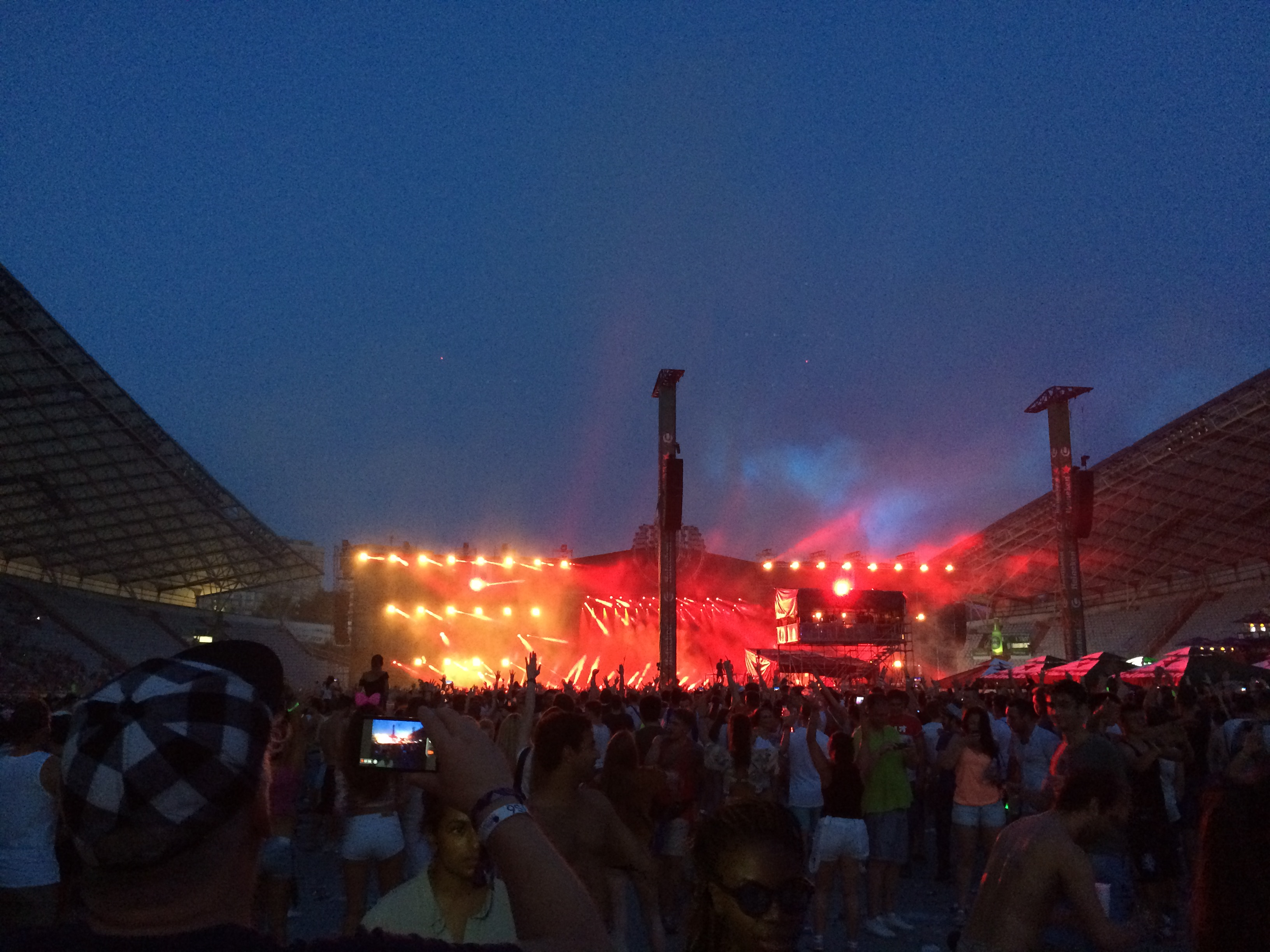

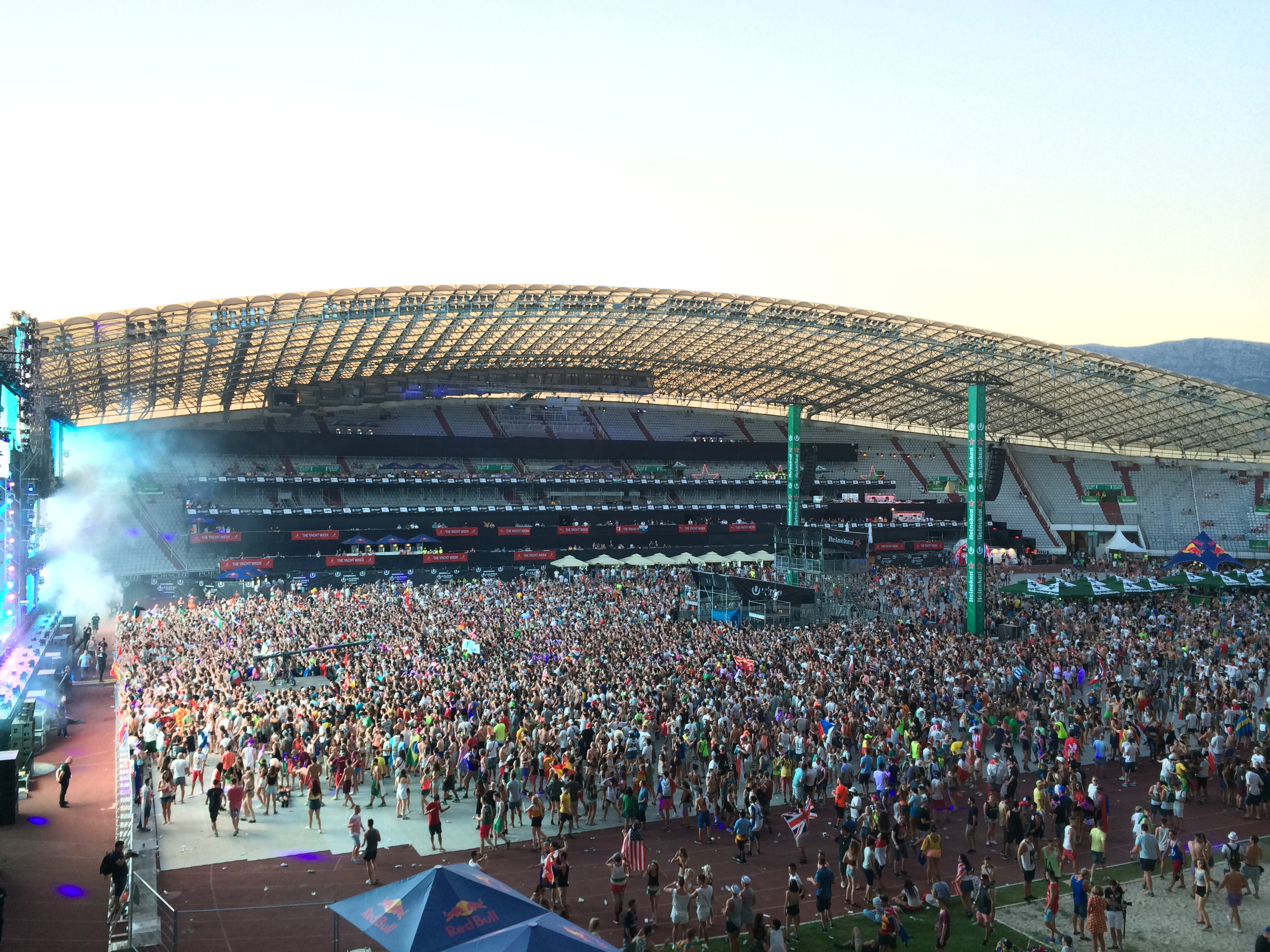

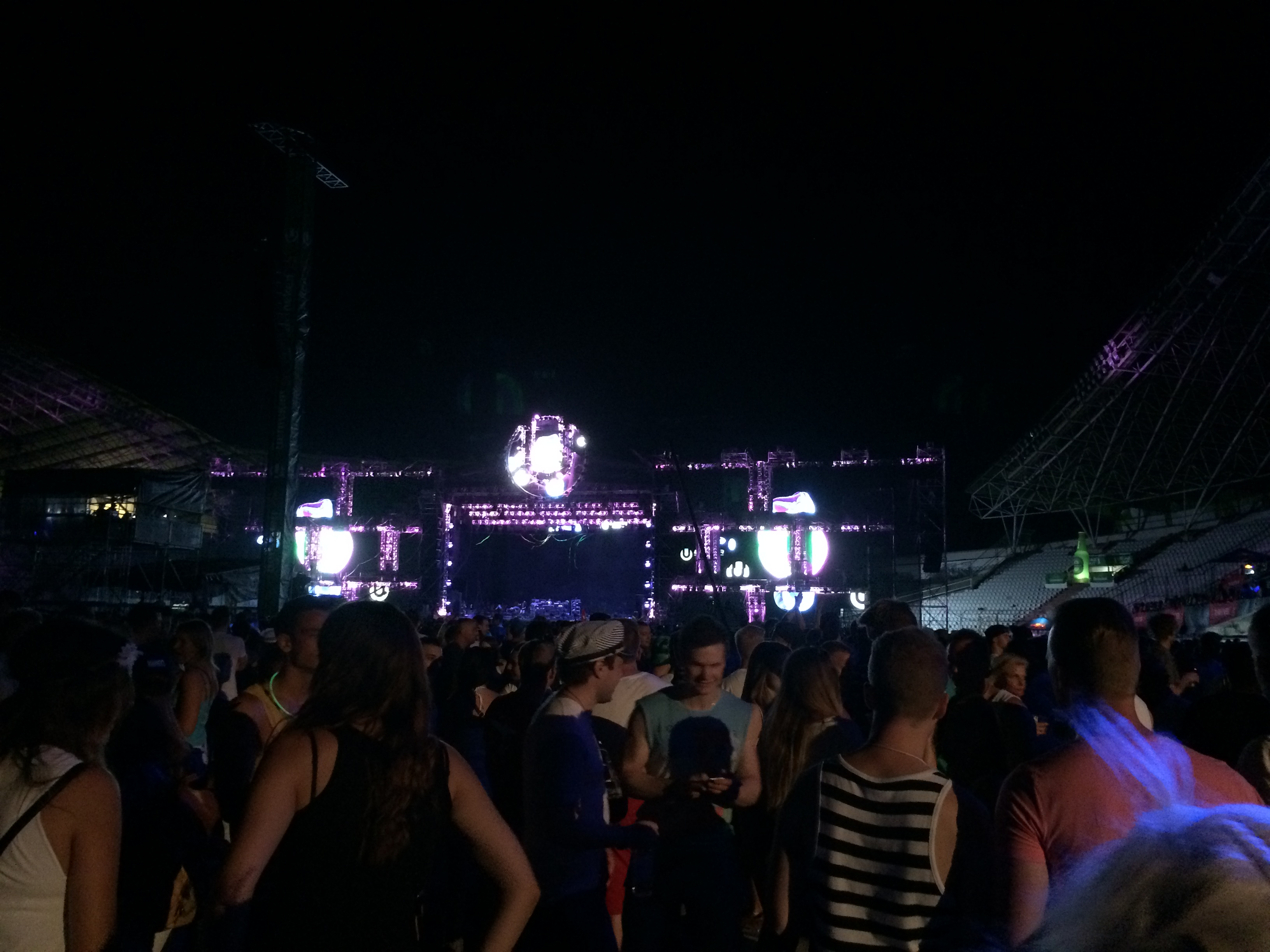

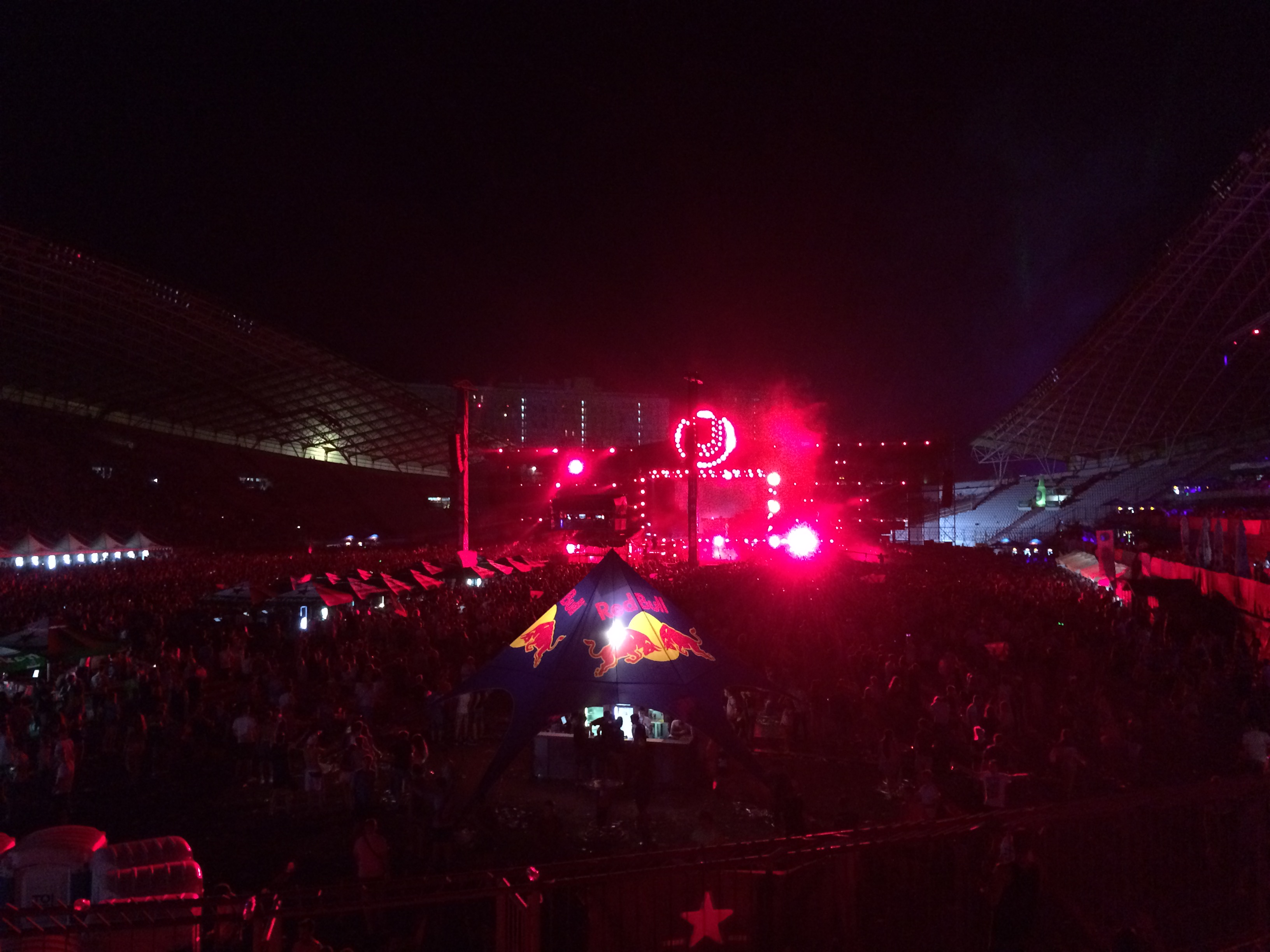

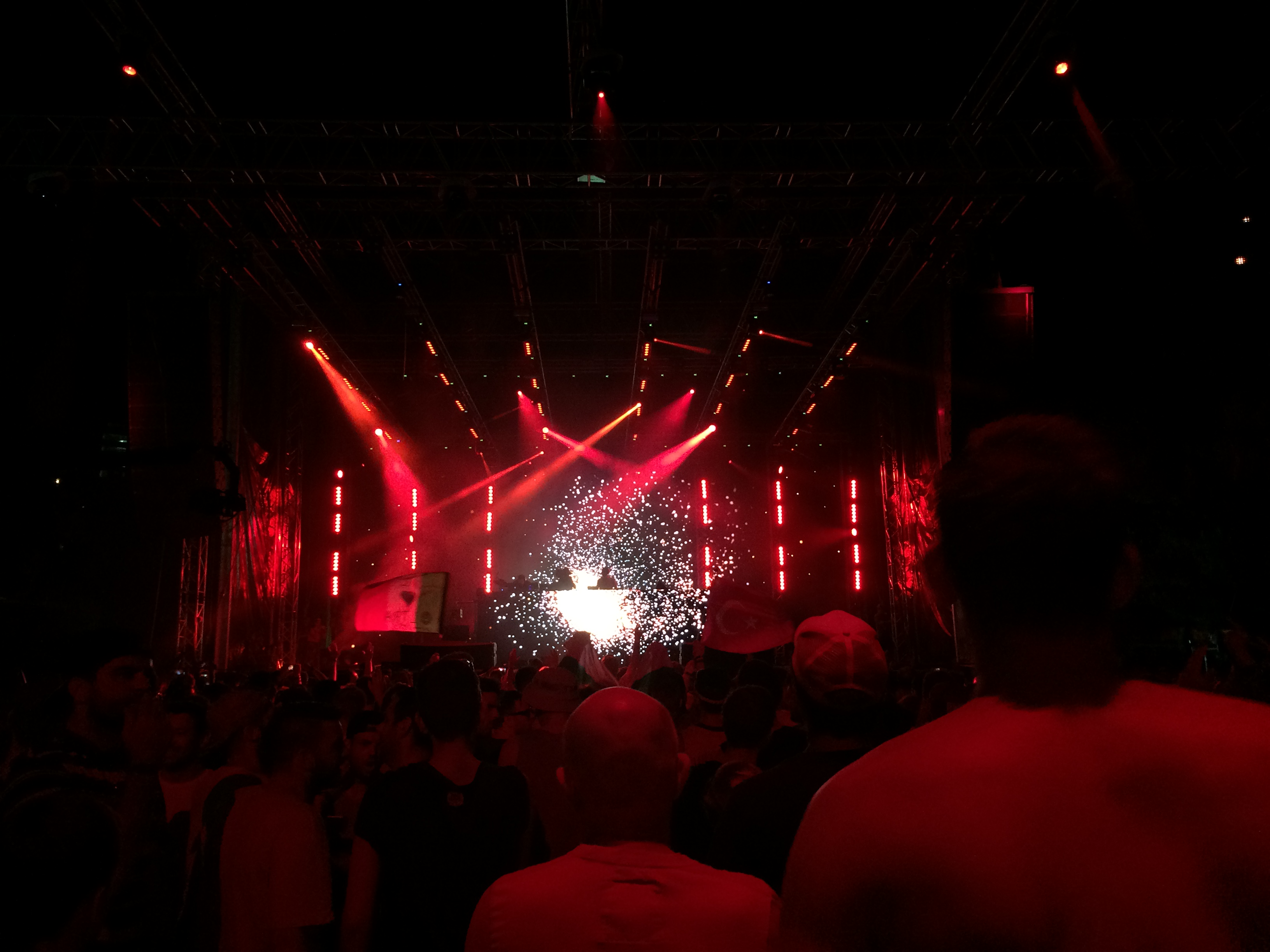

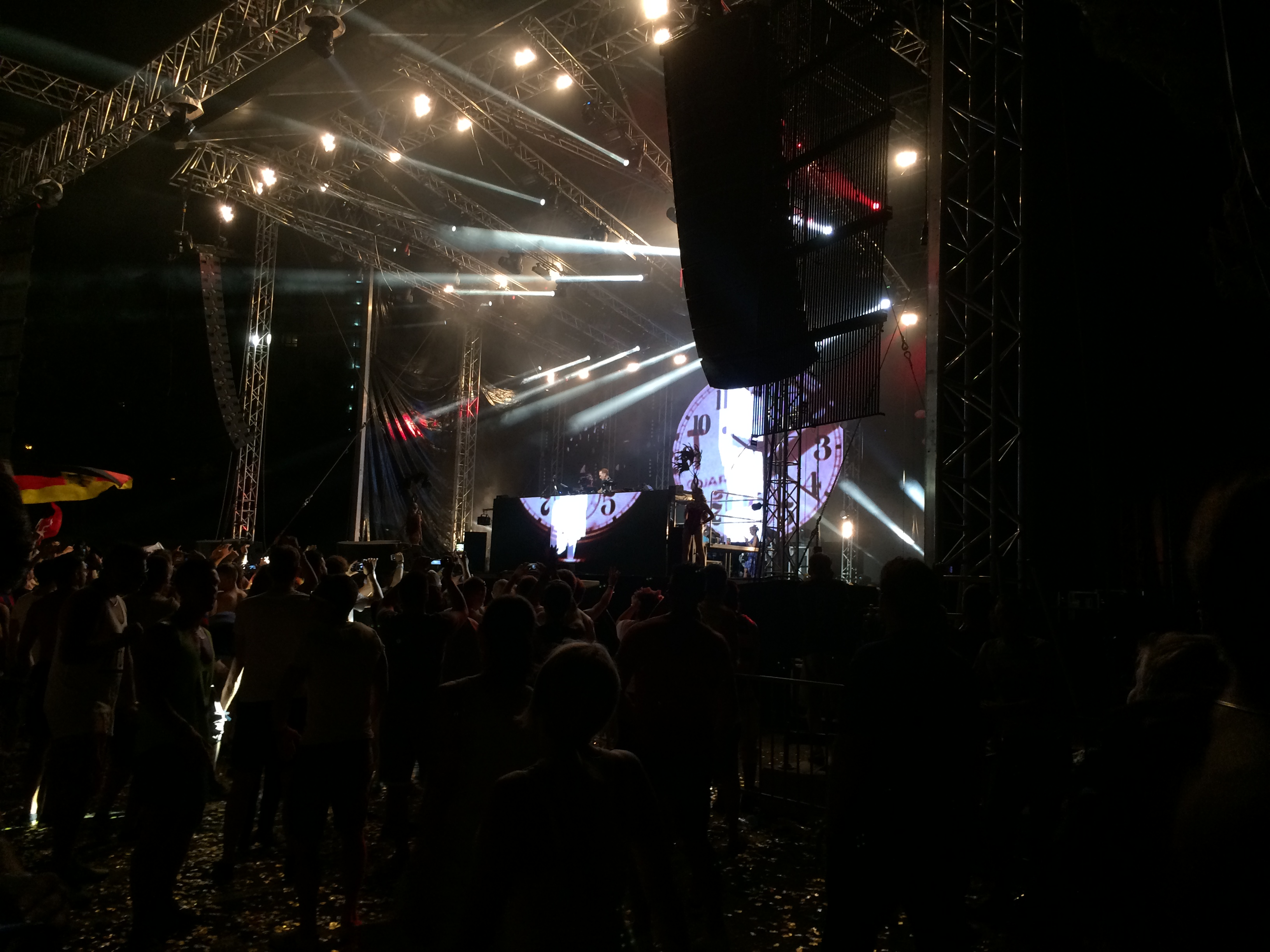

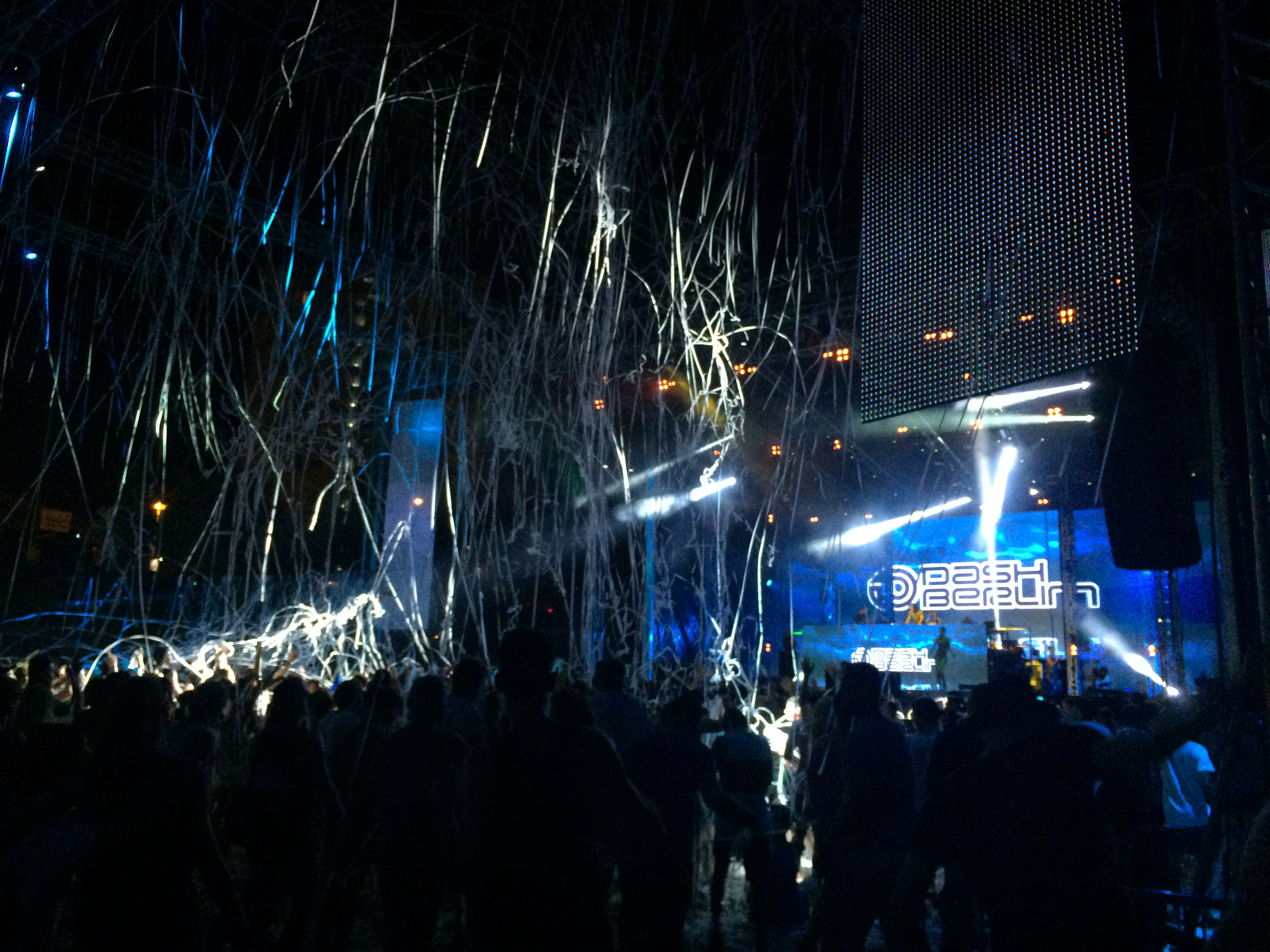

== See also ==
- List of electronic music festivals
- Ultra Music Festival
- Russell Faibisch
- Ultra Brasil
- Ultra Bali
- Ultra Chile
- Ultra Japan
- Ultra Buenos Aires
- Ultra Korea
- Ultra Singapore
- Ultra South Africa
- Road to Ultra
