= Rai =

Rai or RAI may refer to:

== Title of royalty and nobility ==
- Rai (title), meaning 'king', equivalent to Rao or Roy, a princely title used by many Hindu rulers in India
- Rai Bahadur, a noble title given during British Raj in India
- Rai Sahib, a noble title given during British Raj in India

== People ==
- Rai (surname)
- Rai people, in Nepal and India
- Rai Sikh, adherents of Sikh faith

=== Given name ===
- Raí (born 1965), Brazilian footballer
- Raí (footballer, born 2002), full name Raí da Silva Pessanha, Brazilian footballer
- Lady Rai (c. 1570/1560–1530 BC), ancient Egyptian woman, nursemaid to Queen Ahmose-Nefertari
- Rai Benjamin (born 1997), American hurdler
- Rai Marchán (born 1993), Spanish footballer
- Rai Purdy (1910–1990), Canadian television director and producer
- Rai Ragbir (fl. 2020–2025), Trinidad and Tobago politician
- Rai Simons (born 1996), Bermudian footballer
- Rai Thistlethwayte (born 1980), Australian musician
- Rai Vloet (born 1995), Dutch footballer
- I Gusti Ngurah Rai (1917–1946), Indonesian military officer

== Places ==
- Rai, Orne, France
- Rai, Sonipat, Haryana, India
- Rai, South Khorasan, Iran
- Mount Rai Japan
- Chiang Rai Province Thailand
- Bo Rai District Thailand
- Rai, Ternopil Oblast, Ukraine
- Giá Rai District in Vietnam
- RAI Amsterdam Convention Centre, Netherlands
- Rai (Kuwait) or Al-Rai, a district in Farwaniya Governorate, Kuwait

== Entertainment and media ==
- RAI, the national public broadcasting company of Italy
- Raï, folk music originating in Oran, Algeria and popular in France
- Rai (comics), fictional character in Valiant Comics
- Raï (1995 film), a 1995 French film directed by Thomas Gilou
- Rai (2016 film), Indian film about Muthappa Rai
- Al Rai (Kuwaiti newspaper), a daily newspaper
- Al Ra'i (Jordanian newspaper), a daily newspaper
- Alrai TV, a Kuwaiti television channel

== Science, healthcare, and technology ==
- Radioactive iodine uptake test, a diagnostic scan
- Rai (unit), a traditional Thai unit of area
- Rencontre Assyriologique Internationale, annual conference of The International Association for Assyriology
- Root analogue dental implant
- Royal Anthropological Institute of Great Britain and Ireland
- Rural Access Index, an indicator developed by the World Bank to measure how well rural populations are connected

== Transportation ==
- Amsterdam RAI station, a railway station in the Netherlands
- Islamic Republic of Iran Railways
- Praia International Airport in Cape Verde
- Rainham railway station in Kent (National Rail station code)
- Réseau Aérien Interinsulaire, now Air Tahiti

== Other uses ==
- Rai (East Syrian Ecclesiastical Province), a metropolitan province of the Church of the East
- Amsterdam RAI Exhibition and Convention Centre, an exhibition and convention Centre in Amsterdam
- Rai language (disambiguation), a group of Sino-Tibetan languages
- Rai stones, a currency used in Yap, Caroline Islands
- Rai University, in Ahmedabad, Gujarat, India
- Retailers Association of India, an Indian trade association
- Reynolds American Inc., an American tobacco company
- Rai (Thai: ร่าย), a Thai poetic form used in laws and chronicles
- Rai dynasty (c. 416–644 CE), a Buddhist dynasty based in Sindh in modern Pakistan
- List of storms named Rai, Tropical cyclones with this name
- Regia Aeronautica Italiana, an air force of Kingdom of Italy

== See also ==
- Rai Cultura
- Rei (disambiguation)
- Ray (disambiguation)
- Rey (disambiguation)
- Rao (disambiguation)
