= Judge Ray =

Judge Ray may refer to:

- George W. Ray (1844–1925), judge of the United States District Court for the Northern District of New York
- William M. Ray II (born 1963), judge of the United States District Court for the Northern District of Georgia, and judge of the Georgia Court of Appeals

== See also ==
- Justice Ray (disambiguation)
