= Waymond =

Waymond may refer to:

- Waymond Bryant (born 1952), former American football linebacker
- Waymond Jordan (born 2003), American football player
- Waymond C. Huggins (1927–2016), state politician and forest ranger in the state of Georgia
- Hut Stricklin (Waymond Lane Stricklin Jr., born 1961), American former professional stock car racing driver
- Waymond Wang, a fictional character in the 2022 film Everything Everywhere All at Once

== See also ==
- Raymond (disambiguation)
