= Kein Cross =

American fashion designer

- Born: Dallas, Texas, U.S.
- Occupation: Fashion designer

Kein Cross is an American fashion designer, interior designer, and entrepreneur, who founded the New York-based Lifestyle brands La Maison Moderne, a two-story home furnishings boutique, & La Maison Moderne Interiors, and more recently the proprietor of Club RaYé, a cocktail bar in the heart of Paris.

== Early life ==
Kein Cross was born in Dallas, Texas. He spent his early childhood at his family home in Bentonville, Arkansas. His father was in the military and Cross's mother was an artist who was constantly on the move, which meant he was enrolled in 17 different schools before he graduated from high school. He was interested in design from a young age; "as a 6-year-old boy, he was already rearranging the furniture". Kein's love of black and white stripes was apparent from an early age. At the age of five he begged his grandmother, a “Southern belle” whose trade was dressmaking, to make him a black and white striped suit complete with a matching hat. Cross attributes his love of fashion to his grandmother's skills.

Apart from fashion and black and white stripes, young Cross had an insatiable fascination with all things French. At the age of three, his parents bought a Citroen sports car with 3 wheels, which was something quite rare in rural Arkansas, and he was struck by the car's "exoticism". This signalled the beginning of his journey to become the "number 1 Francophile". One day after school, Cross returned home with a book titled How To Speak French, which slightly perturbed his parents, but their lack of enthusiasm couldn't quell his interest in the language, the country and its culture.

== Career ==
Cross has held a number of different jobs. His first job after leaving school was working at an abattoir, which he says gave him the motivation needed to find something he was truly interested in. He soon moved to New York City to pursue a career in fashion and design.

=== New York ===
After moving to New York City, Cross found a job designing window displays at the Metropolitan Museum of Art. He then worked as a window-display designer for both Barneys New York and Henri Bendel in the mid-1980s.

Eager to return to the world of interiors, Cross opened Cross & Spellen Home, a modern furniture and home-decoratives store, with Spellen. In 1992, Cross branched out on his own with La Maison Moderne Interiors, an interior-design business, and La Maison Moderne, his two-story home furnishings boutique at 144 West 19th Street, "pioneering the Chelsea location before it became fashionable".

At La Maison Moderne, clients didn't just shop; they enjoyed sparkling champagne or fresh coffee while perusing the wares at either end of his spiral staircase. His two-pronged operation was a consistent success during its eleven-year run, receiving well-deserved attention from thousands of clients as well as media including: The New York Times, Architectural Digest, New York Magazine, Town & Country, Condé Nast Traveler, Elle Décor, British Vogue, In Style, W, Women's Wear Daily, and Esquire. Eventually, the success of these ventures made it possible to open more outlets and turn the brand into a chain.

=== Paris ===
Cross moved to Paris in 2011, settling in a house a few blocks away from Notre Dame in the Fourth Arrondissement. The exterior was battered and marred by a bricked-up window; the kitchen had an old water heater that "stuck out like a sore thumb" and the bathroom was "grubby", but the owner was happy to let Cross do anything he wanted, and the rent was half the market rate.
