= Radius Limited =

British fleet services provider

Radius Limited (Radius Payment Solutions/ UK Fuels)
- Industry: Payment and Fleet Services
- Founded: 1990
- Headquarters: Crewe, Cheshire
- Key people: CEO Lee Everett; Executive Chairman Bill Holmes
- Website: www.radius.com

Radius Limited is a fleet and mobility solutions provider with a focus on software and technology headquartered in Crewe, Cheshire. Established in 1990, Radius has a presence in 29 countries and operates services across Telematics, Fuel Cards, Insurance, Vehicle Solutions, Telecoms and EV.

== History ==
Since being founded in 1990 in Crewe, Cheshire the business has grown both organically and through acquisition.

- 1995 - New joint venture with DCI in Ireland marked European expansion
- 2000 - Acquisition of Danish outdoor payment terminal supplier Multiple Card Systems (MCS) marks move into Scandinavia
- 2004 - Launch of DCB - 'diesel card belgium' in Belgium
- 2006 - Launch of European fuel card EDC at a key transport hub in Calais
- 2007 - Netherlands office opened
- 2009 - Portuguese office opened
- 2010 - Spanish & Italian office opened, continuing the expansion into mainland Europe, as a strategic partnership with Shell is established
- 2012 - Swedish office opened continuing the expansion into Scandinavia
- 2013 - 'Radius Payment Solutions' was formed following a merger of over 20 European fuel card companies. German office opened in Berlin as a reseller contract is signed with Esso
- 2014 - Acquisition of Diesel Card Ireland Ltd and Creation of French company Carte Carburant Service following the opening of an office in Lille
- 2015 - 'Kinesis' - First vehicle tracking solution launched in Europe, including integration option with fuel cards
- 2016 - Expansion into South-East Asia with new offices in Singapore and Malaysia. Radius was featured on the Fast Track Top Track 100 list as the 31st largest privately owned business in the UK.
- 2017 - Global expansion continues as telematics sales begin in the USA
- 2018 - Radius Campus, the new multi-million pound global HQ, opens in the UK and UK Private Equity house, Inflexion, invests £150m into the business
- 2019 - Expansion into Australia with an office in Melbourne. Telematics product offering enhanced and 25,000 new devices added through the acquisition of plant and construction telematics specialist Plant-i, CyntrX telematics, and Strategic investment in South-African based, international white-label telematics platform provider, Key Telematics. Additionally, Radius Insurance Solutions, a UK broker, launched and strengthened through the acquisition of The Burley Group, a motor and fleet focussed general insurance brokerage. On the telecoms side - Pure Telecom, midlands based mobile telecoms specialist, and Trinity Maxwell were acquired.
- 2020 - Radius Electric Vehicles created through investment in Netherlands headquartered electric vehicle charging provider Chargepoint Europe. Acquisition of Amelix Telecom and Belfast based Connect Total Communications. With regional offices in Aberdeen and Lewes, the geographical footprint of the Telecoms division grows and Radius Connect is created as the Telecoms brand for the group.
- 2021 - Expanded telematics product range with the acquisition vehicle tracking mobile app developer, Modus. Strengthened the existing Radius Telematics business in Australia through the acquisition of Connect Fleet, a leading fleet management provider. 16,000 UK mobile connections added through acquisition of health and social care specialist, Frontier Group. Investment in Tariffcom, one of the UK's leading suppliers of technology and pricing analysis services to the Telecoms industry. Acquisition of Belfast based provider of connectivity and hosted VOIP and mobile services, Rainbow Communications. Expansion of Telecoms into the Republic of Ireland, acquiring Telcom, a Dublin head-quartered provider of connectivity services. Acquisition of UK motor retail broker, Milestone Insurance and wholesale insurance broker, Signature Underwriting. Expansion of Radius Telematics Asset Tracking products and services through the acquisition of CanTrack Global. Radius Vehicle Solutions created through the acquisition of Global Go, providing flexible vehicle rental and leasing for commercial vehicles. Deepened complex camera expertise through the acquisition of telematics provider VUE Group.
- 2022 - Established telecoms presence in Germany through acquisition of Municall. Acquired AirTelecom, adding 11,000 connections and a Birmingham base, completing UK Telecoms expansion. Established insurance presence in Ireland through acquisition of Keystone Insurance, based in Dundalk.
- 2023 - Lee Everett appointed as Group CEO, Bill Holmes appointed as Executive Chairman.
- 2024 - Radius Group reports turnover of more than £4 billion.
- 2025 - Radius celebrates 35th Anniversary with Starball event in March. 'The Sunday Times' announces Radius as one of its top '26 best very big places to work' in June. The Group becomes a Patron to South Cheshire Chamber of Commerce to support the local community in Crewe. Jolawn Victor joins as Divisional CEO for Telematics. Opens North American Telematics Headquarters in Atlanta, Georgia.
