= Reye =

Reye may refer to:

- Douglas Reye (1912–1977), an Australian pathologist
  - Reye syndrome, a brain disease
- Theodor Reye (1838–1919), a German mathematician
  - Reye configuration
  - Reye's hypothesis

== See also ==
- Reyes (disambiguation)
- Raye (disambiguation)
