= Raymond High School =

Raymond High School may refer to:

- Raymond High School (Alberta), Canada
- Raymond High School (Mississippi), United States
- Raymond High School (New Hampshire), United States
