= Raymond Township =

Raymond Township may refer to:

== Canada ==
- Raymond township, in Timiskaming District, Ontario

== United States ==
- Raymond Township, Monroe County, Arkansas, in Monroe County, Arkansas
- Raymond Township, Champaign County, Illinois
- Raymond Township, Montgomery County, Illinois
- Raymond Township, Rice County, Kansas
- Raymond Township, Stearns County, Minnesota
- Raymond Township, Knox County, Nebraska
- Raymond Township, Cass County, North Dakota, in Cass County, North Dakota
