= Club RaYé =

Cocktail bar in Paris, France

- Interactive map of Club RaYé
- Location: 26 Rue Dussoubs, Paris, France
- Coordinates: 48.866°N 2.349°E
- Owner: Kein Cross
- Type: Jazz club
- Capacity: 150

Construction
- Opened: 2012

Website
- clubraye.com

Club RaYé was a cocktail bar and jazz club in Paris, France. It is located on Rue Dussoubs in the Montorgueil district of the Parisian 2nd arrondissement.

== History ==
Club RaYé occupies the renovated space of an old material & fabric warehouse. Club RaYé has a ground floor dining area with a large bar on the left, in the other corner rests a grand piano and microphones for the frequent guest singers. Downstairs, customers come down to a renovated cellar space named the Kafka Lounge, after Franz Kafka. The owner, Kein Cross, was inspired by The Metamorphosis when designing the décor of the Kafka Lounge. It has the kitchen and also two adjacent dining areas ideal for private parties, meetings and exclusive dining. The rooms have independent sound systems; two of the rooms feature stages for live acts.

== Style ==
The musical genres played At Club RaYé vary. During the evening (from 5pm until 11pm) there are often live jazz musicians playing or singing classic jazz numbers, from musicians such as Nina Simone, Cole Porter, Miles Davis, Frank Sinatra, Peggy Lee, Edith Piaf and many others. After the live acts have ended, Club RaYé hosts a number of resident DJs during "The Kafka Lounge DJ Zebra Party" which is described as a "Jazz - electro soundclash", including tempos from hip hop, techno, drum and bass and electro.

== See also ==
Kein Cross, owner of Club RaYé
