= Rural Access Index =

Measure of access to rural transport networks

The Rural Access Index (RAI) is an international indicator used to measure how well rural populations are connected to reliable transport networks, developed by the World Bank in 2006. Specifically, it shows the percentage of the rural population living within 2 kilometers of an all-season road—a road that is accessible to motorized vehicles throughout the year, even during the rainy season.

The RAI is important because rural roads are a lifeline for communities: they enable access to markets, schools, health services, and jobs. A higher RAI generally reflects better opportunities for economic development and reduced poverty in rural areas. Conversely, a low RAI indicates significant isolation, where people may need to walk long distances, rely on animals, or face seasonal cutoffs that disrupt mobility and livelihoods.

== History and development ==
- 2006: Developed by the World Bank as a poverty and access indicator, originally based on household surveys and statistical modeling.
- 2016: The methodology was updated to leverage geospatial techniques using open datasets to improve consistency, sustainability, and operational relevance.
- 2019: Transport Research Laboratory (TRL) under Research for Community Access Partnership (ReCAP) introduced supplemental guidelines, incorporating a probabilistic "passability" approach to account for unpaved or variable-quality roads rather than excluding them altogether.

== Methodology ==
The calculation of the Rural Access Index is based on geospatial analysis, combining road network data, population distribution, and environmental factors. The methodology is typically structured in the following steps:

=== Define rural areas ===
Rural and urban boundaries are distinguished using population density or land cover datasets. Common sources include the Global Human Settlement Layer–Degree of Urbanisation (GHS-SMOD) and the Global Rural–Urban Mapping Project (GRUMP).

=== Map road networks ===
Road data are obtained from multiple sources in order to maximize completeness and consistency:

- Global Roads Inventory Project (GRIP), which provides information on road condition and classification.
- OpenStreetMap (OSM) for surface type and road classification.
- Satellite imagery: To capture missing roads.

=== Classify roads ===
Roads are categorized into:

- All-season roads: paved roads or higher-class roads that are accessible throughout the year, with only minor interruptions, identified via GRIP or OSM (and of sufficient hierarchy).
- Exposed roads: unpaved or lower-quality roads, or those detected only through satellite imagery, which may not remain passable during adverse weather.

=== Buffer application ===
A buffer of 2 kilometres is applied around both all-season and exposed roads. The buffered areas are then rasterized to enable spatial overlay with population data.

=== Calculate passability for exposed roads ===
Estimate the probability that an exposed road remains passable year-round by applying a passability index (ranging from 0 to 1), based on:

- Slope and terrain characteristics
- Rainfall intensity and patterns
- Proxies for maintenance, such as GDP per capita

Raster algebra combines these factors to calculate a continuous passability score

=== Population overlay ===
Population data are combined with the road buffers:

- Populations within 2 km of an all-season road are assigned full access.
- Populations within 2 km of an exposed road are weighted by the passability index.

Where buffers overlap, the maximum access value is applied.

=== Derive the index ===
The Rural Access Index is calculated as the ratio of the rural population with access to all-season roads to the total rural population:

- $R$: set of rural population locations (cells or villages).
- $p_i$: population of location $i$.
- $a_i$: access factor assigned to population $p_i$.
- $d_i$: distance from location $i$ to the nearest road.
- $\pi_i$: passability probability for exposed roads, between 0 and 1.
- $s_i$: slope or terrain factor affecting road usability.
- $r_i$: rainfall intensity affecting seasonal impassability.
- $m_i$: maintenance proxy (often GDP per capita or local investment).
- $f(s_i, r_i, m_i)$: function estimating the year-round passability of an exposed road, combining terrain, climate, and maintenance factors

$\mathrm{RAI} \;=\; \frac{\sum_{i \in R} p_i \, a_i}{\sum_{i \in R} p_i}$

$$a_i \;=\;
\begin{cases}
1, & \text{if } d_i \leq 2 \;\text{km and road type = all-season}, \\[6pt]
\pi_i, & \text{if } d_i \leq 2 \;\text{km and road type = exposed}, \\[6pt]
0, & \text{if } d_i > 2 \;\text{km}.
\end{cases}$$

$\pi_i \in [0,1], \quad \pi_i = f(s_i, r_i, m_i)$

== Data ==
Initially the RAI relied on household survey data, such as the Living Standards Measurement Study (LSMS) and Poverty Surveys (PS), which varied in frequency and representativeness across countries, leading to inconsistencies in data quality. In 2016, the World Bank introduced a new methodology utilizing geospatial techniques, incorporating global population distribution datasets, road network data, and road condition data. However, the quality and coverage of these data sources vary across regions, particularly in developing countries where open-source data like OpenStreetMap (OSM) have lower coverage, potentially leading to inaccuracies in RAI calculations, therefore it is difficult to have a unified and standardized index data calculation result.
