= Ray, Belgorod Oblast =

Ray Рай
- Settlement
- Location within Belgorod Oblast Location within Russia
- Coordinates: 50°23′N 37°51′E
- Country: Russia
- Region: Belgorod Oblast
- District: Volokonovsky District
- Time zone: UTC+3:00

Ray (Russian: Рай) is a rural locality (a settlement) in Volokonovsky District, Belgorod Oblast, Russia. The population was 8 as of 2010. There is 1 street.

== Geography ==
Ray is located 17 km south of Volokonovka (the district's administrative centre) by road. Ulyanovka is the nearest rural locality.
