= Wrey =

Wrey may also refer to:

- WREY, an AM radio station in St. Paul, Minnesota
- Wrey Gardiner (1901–1981), English writer and publisher
- Wrey baronets, a title in the Baronetage of England; including a list of people who have held the title
- John Wrey (died 1597), member of the British gentry

== See also ==
- Wray (disambiguation)
- Ray (disambiguation)
