= Radius Travel =

- Company type: Private
- Founded: 1992
- Headquarters: Washington, DC, USA
- Key people: Nicole Wilcock, Executive Director, Global Network
- Services: Corporate travel management
- Website: www.radiustravel.com

Radius Travel is a privately held global travel management company with headquarters in Washington, DC, USA. Radius designs and delivers travel programs for multinational companies through a network of travel agencies. The Radius network is made up of 100+ agencies and manages over US$30 billion of annual corporate travel spending.

The company has existed in its present form since 1992 as a result of a merger between two independent North American travel management companies.

In 2018, Radius Travel was acquired by Travel and Transport, a U.S.-based travel management company.
