= Benjamin Raye =

Benjamin Raye is an American singer-songwriter and radio personality from Minneapolis, MN. He rose to prominence at KQRS in Minneapolis as an on-air announcer, along with sister-station KXXR. He also writes and records music and performs many live shows in the Twin Cities area. He is a distant cousin of John Cacavas, legendary composer for TV and film.

== Radio Career ==
His radio career began at KKIN in Aitkin, Minnesota doing sports play-by-play for local high schools. Since then he has also worked at stations such as Kiss 96.7 in St. Cloud, MN, KCLD in St. Cloud, MN and BOB FM 106.1 in the Minneapolis area.

From 2006 to 2011, while at BOB FM, Benjamin Raye was the backup co-host on the morning show with Minnesota radio hall-of-famer, Chuck Knapp. In 2014, Raye began working at KQRS in Minneapolis, and was an occasional guest on the 92 KQRS Morning Show with national radio hall-of-famer Tom Barnard.

Raye also supports Minnesota local music, being a host of a local music radio show on BOB FM radio for 10 years, followed by a local rock show which aired from 2015 to 2018 on KXXR on Sunday nights. In 2018, he began a weekly local music show, "Everything Minnesota Music" which airs every Tuesday morning on KFAI in Minneapolis, and also was accompanied by a TV version of the show that aired locally on The CW local affiliate WUCW in Minneapolis for 1 season in 2021.

In 2012, he won an ICoMA award for the Most Indie-Friendly radio show, for his local music show on BOB FM.

In 2019, Raye began working at WHMH-FM, Rockin' 101, in St. Cloud, where he is currently on-air weeknights 7 PM to Midnight.

== Music career ==
Raye's music style has crossed genres, from country to alternative rock and pop.

The first song to make national charts for Raye was his single "Far Away" which made #582 nationally on the AAA (adult album alternative) charts on Mediabase on 8 October 2011.

In 2012, Raye won the award for the most-promising new artist from the Independent Country Music Association in Nashville.

In 2014, he released his first solo full-length CD, "Come And Get It".

Several of his songs have been played on radio stations across the U.S. His song "Shy Side Of Three" entered the top-400 on the Active Rock chart on 15 March 2014.

Also in 2014, Raye's song "New Guitar" charted nationally on the Mediabase Country Music charts for 3 weeks, peaking at #224. His single "Downtown" peaked at #190 nationally on the Mediabase Country Music chart on 26 April 2014.

In early 2015, he had a second song enter the top-200 nationally on the Mediabase charts. "65 To Nashville" charted at #194 on 14 February 2015.

In 2016, Raye signed a contract with an indie record label out of Nashville, TN where he recorded his single "Somewhere" with long-time Tim McGraw drummer Billy "Thunder" Mason. The following year, he returned to Nashville to record his single "You Are My Love Song" with the label, again using Mason on drums. A third song was later recorded and released on his "Nashville Sessions" EP in 2020.

In 2024, Raye released his latest single "Not Much To Write About" which was again recorded in Nashville.

== Film ==
Aside from radio and music, Benjamin Raye has also made some cameo appearances on movies. In 2011, he appeared as himself in the movie "Invincible Force" His song "Like It Or Not" was also featured on a Halloween short-film titled "7 minutes" which was released on Halloween in 2013.
