= Justice Ray =

Justice Ray may refer to:

- C. L. Ray Jr. (1931–2018), justice of the Texas Supreme Court
- Charles Ray (Indiana judge) (1829–1912), associate justice of the Indiana Supreme Court
- Robert D. Ray (Missouri judge) (1817–1891), associate justice of the Supreme Court of Missouri

== See also ==
- Judge Ray (disambiguation)
