= Ray (film magazine) =

Austrian film magazine

ray Filmmagazin
- Categories: Film
- Frequency: Ten issues per year, including two double issues
- Founded: 2001
- First issue: April 2001
- Country: Austria
- Based in: Vienna
- Language: German
- Website: ray-magazin.at
- ISSN: 1993-811X

ray Filmmagazin is an Austrian film magazine based in Vienna. Founded in 2001, it covers cinema, film culture and audiovisual media, including reviews of current theatrical releases, articles on DVD and Blu-ray publications, festival reports, interviews and essays on developments in film and cinema. The magazine appears ten times a year, including two double issues.

== History ==
The first issue of ray appeared in April 2001. The founding editorial team included Andreas Ungerböck as editor-in-chief, together with Bernhard Seiter and Maya McKechneay.

After the bankruptcy of PVS Verlag, former editor-in-chief Andreas Ungerböck and other staff members acquired the magazine from the bankruptcy estate and relaunched it through substance media ltd.

In a 2008 APA-OTS press release, Andreas Ungerböck and Mitko Javritchev were named as publishers of ray Filmmagazin. The current media owner is ray Medien GmbH in Vienna. Distribution in Germany is handled through Schüren Verlag.

== Publications and collaborations ==
In addition to its regular issues, ray publishes special issues and programme publications connected with Austrian film festivals and institutions. These have included publications for Crossing Europe and the Diagonale.

In 2017, ray and the Film Academy Vienna published a special issue to mark the academy's 65th anniversary.

The magazine has also acted as a media partner of the Viennale. For the 2025 festival, the Viennale listed ray among its media partners for special publications and formats, noting that the magazine published a Viennale focus in its October issue and that its writers reported on the festival online.

=== Ray Audience Award at Crossing Europe ===
At the Crossing Europe film festival, the ray Publikumspreis — ray Audience Award — was awarded from 2006 to 2010. The award was worth €5,000 and was powered by ray Filmmagazin.

The winners were:

- 2006: Kontakt / Contact by Sergej Stanojkovski
- 2007: Avril / April in Love by Gérald Hustache-Mathieu
- 2008: Ljubav i drugi zločini / Love and Other Crimes by Stefan Arsenijević
- 2009: Unmade Beds by Alexis Dos Santos
- 2010: Cœur Animal / Animal Heart by Séverine Cornamusaz
