= Radiation (disambiguation) =

Radiation is a process in which a body emits energy that propagates through a medium or through empty space, but is absorbed by other bodies.

Radiation may also refer to:

== Physics ==
- Electromagnetic radiation, radiation that takes the form of a self-propagating wave of electric and magnetic fields,
  - Particular wavelength bands of full electromagnetic spectrum, such as gamma rays, radio waves, visible light
  - Thermal radiation, electromagnetic radiation that emanates from every object above absolute zero in proportion to the fourth power of its temperature
  - Synchrotron radiation (also called a synchrotron light source), electromagnetic radiation generated by the acceleration of fast moving charged particles through magnetic fields
- Gravitational radiation, radiation that takes the form of gravitational waves, or ripples in the curvature of spacetime.
- Ionizing radiation, radiation that is of high enough energy to cause atoms to lose or gain electrons, rendering molecules, such as proteins, incapable of functioning
- Nuclear radiation, radiation, especially ionizing radiation, that emanates from nuclear processes such as radioactive decay
- Acoustic radiation, which takes the form of mechanical waves in a physical transmission medium, such as ultrasound, sound, and seismic waves

== Medicine ==
- Radiation therapy, also called radiotherapy, a medical treatment that involves exposing part or all of the body to a controlled amount of ionizing radiation
- Optic or acoustic radiations, signal pathway structures of human brain white matter in the visual and auditory systems

== Evolutionary biology ==
- Evolutionary radiation, a diversification into several lineages from a common ancestor
- Adaptive radiation, an evolutionary radiation to fill many ecological niches

== Music and arts ==
- Radiation (album), released in 1998, the tenth studio album by the British progressive rock band Marillion
- Roddy Radiation, stage name of Roddy Byers (born 1955), English musician
- A pseudonym of Toby Fox, composer for the webcomic Homestuck, and creator of the video games Undertale and Deltarune.
- "Radiation", a 1997 song by Feeder, from the album Polythene
- "Radiation", a 2011 song by Gavin DeGraw, from the album Sweeter

== Other ==
- Radiation, Inc., now Harris Corporation
