= Martha Wray =

- Born: 1739
- Died: 1788 (aged 48–49)
- Spouse(s): William Wray (?-1766, his death)
- Relatives: Robert Turlington, uncle

Martha Wray (1739-1788), was an English businessperson.

== Career ==
She was the niece of the weaver Robert Turlington (1697–1766), who invented and sold the then famous medicine Balsam of Life from 1744. Turlington was working with William Wray, Martha's husband, to export the medicine to the American colonies by 1750.

Both men died in 1766, and Turlington left the business to his niece, Martha Wray, and his niece-in-law, Mary Sopp. Martha Wray invited her brother-in-law, Hilton Wray, to join the business in 1773. In 1774, Mary Sopp left the business to marry.

Martha Wray died in 1788, but Hilton Wray continued to run the business until 1804, when he filed for bankruptcy.

== Personal life ==
She was married to William Wray until his death in 1766.

== Legacy ==
She was one of the successful 18th-century businesswomen portrayed in the exhibition ‘City Women in the 18th Century’ in London 21 September – 18 October 2019.
