= Flamingo Gardens =

Botanical garden and wildlife sanctuary in Davie, Florida

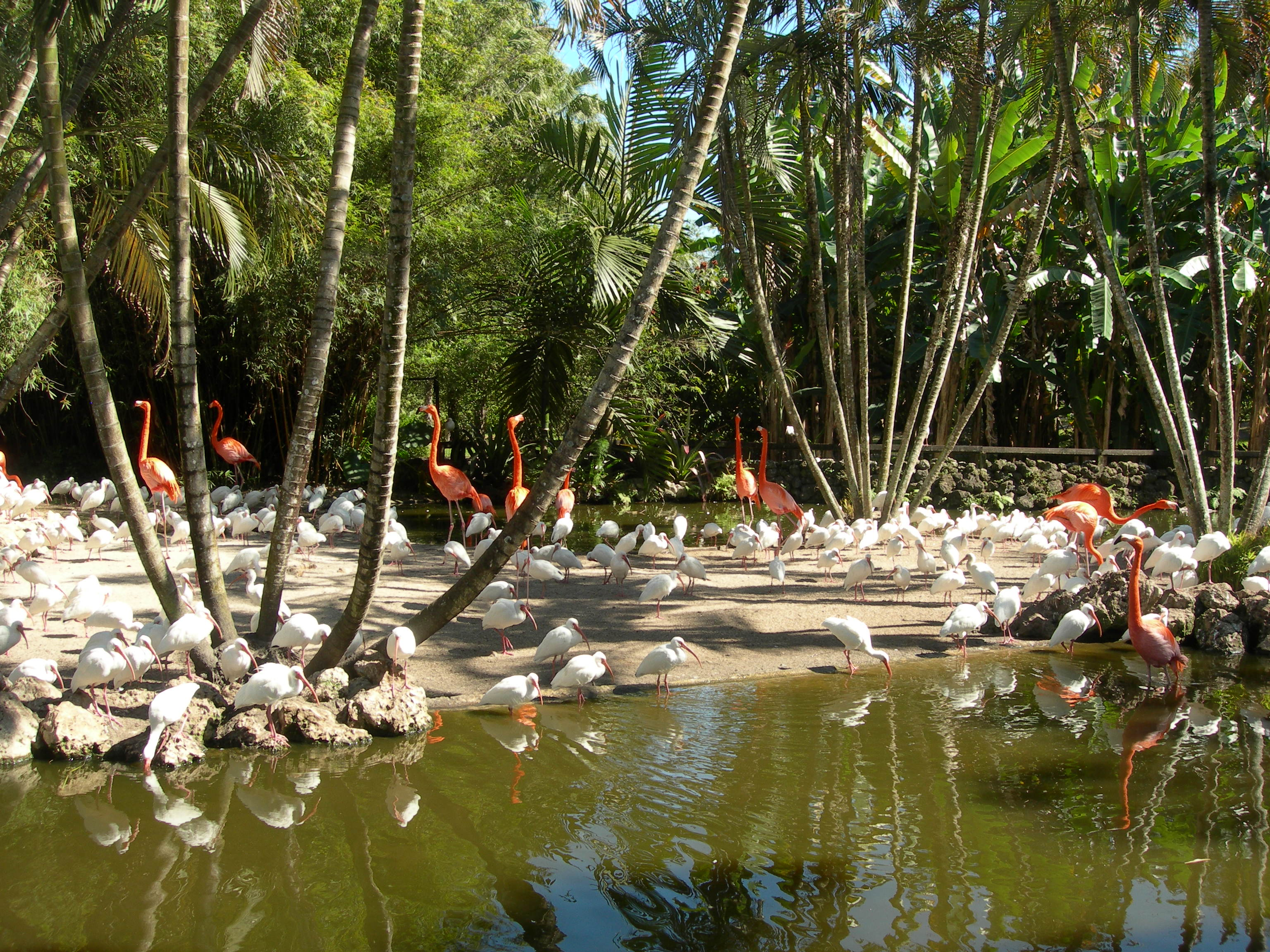
- Flamingoes, one of the main attractions of Flamingo Gardens

- Location within Florida Location within the United States
- Location: 3750 South Flamingo Road, Davie, Broward County, Florida, United States
- Coordinates: 26°04′25″N 80°18′46″W
- Area: 60-acre (24 ha)
- Created: January 2, 1927; 99 years ago
- Status: Open year-round
- Website: flamingogardens.org

Flamingo Gardens is a 60-acre (24 ha) botanical garden and wildlife sanctuary, located just west of Fort Lauderdale, Florida and north of Miami at 3750 South Flamingo Road, Davie, Florida, United States. It is open year-round to the public for a fee.

== History ==
Located in South Florida, the Gardens were originally the property of Floyd L. and Jane Wray, who in 1927 built a weekend home, citrus grove, and laboratory on what was then the edge of the Everglades, where they started a botanical collection of rare and unusual tropical and subtropical exotics, fruit trees, and specimens collected from around the world.

The non-profit Floyd L. Wray Memorial Foundation was established to preserve the property and its gardens for future generations. The Wray Home is now a museum illustrating a country home in the early 1930s. Guided tours are provided multiple times per day.

== Collection ==
Flamingo Gardens house many species of flora and fauna, both native and exotic.

=== Plants ===
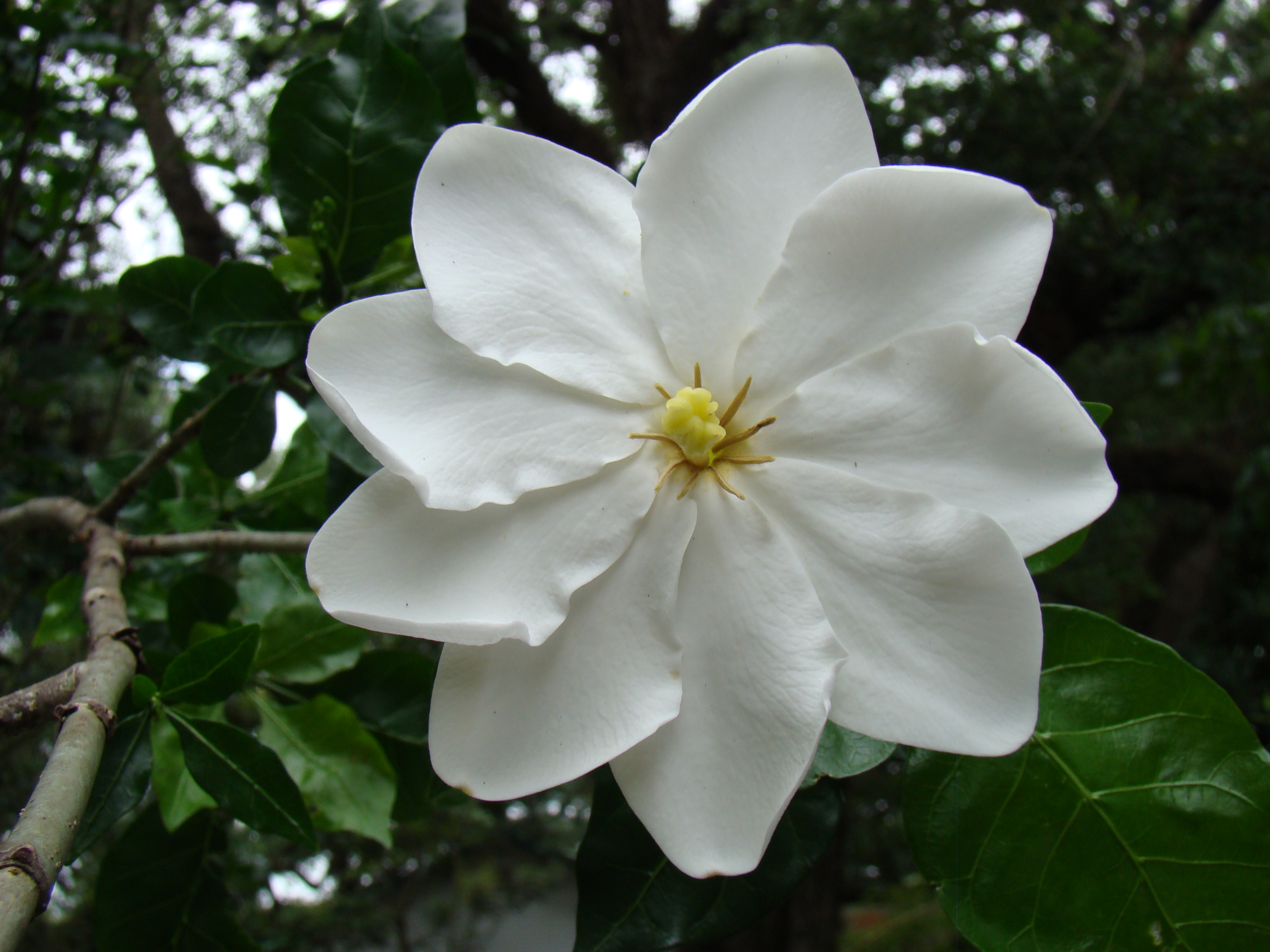
Gardenia thunbergia, one of the many flowering plants within Flamingo Gardens

The grounds contain more than 3,000 species of tropical and subtropical plants, including a 200-year-old southern live oak and over 300 species of palms. A narrated tram ride leads through the site's tropical rainforest, native hammock, wetland areas, and exotic flora.

The gardens are home to nationally noted collections of heliconias, gingers, calatheas, bromeliads, flowering trees, palms, crotons, aroids, succulents, orchids, ferns, and cycads, as well as a mango orchard and a pollinator's garden.

On the grounds is a jungle-like arboretum featuring twenty-three Champion Trees, which may be the largest in the state or the country; one of their Champion Trees an Enterolobium cyclocarpum (ear tree). The arboretum contains one of the largest collection of non-indigenous champion trees in the region. Among the specimens include pink trumpet tree, yellow poinciana, dynamite tree, Indian jujube, bread nut tree, wampi, and white sapote among others. The Xeriscape Garden demonstrates low maintenance, minimally-watered gardening.

=== Animals ===
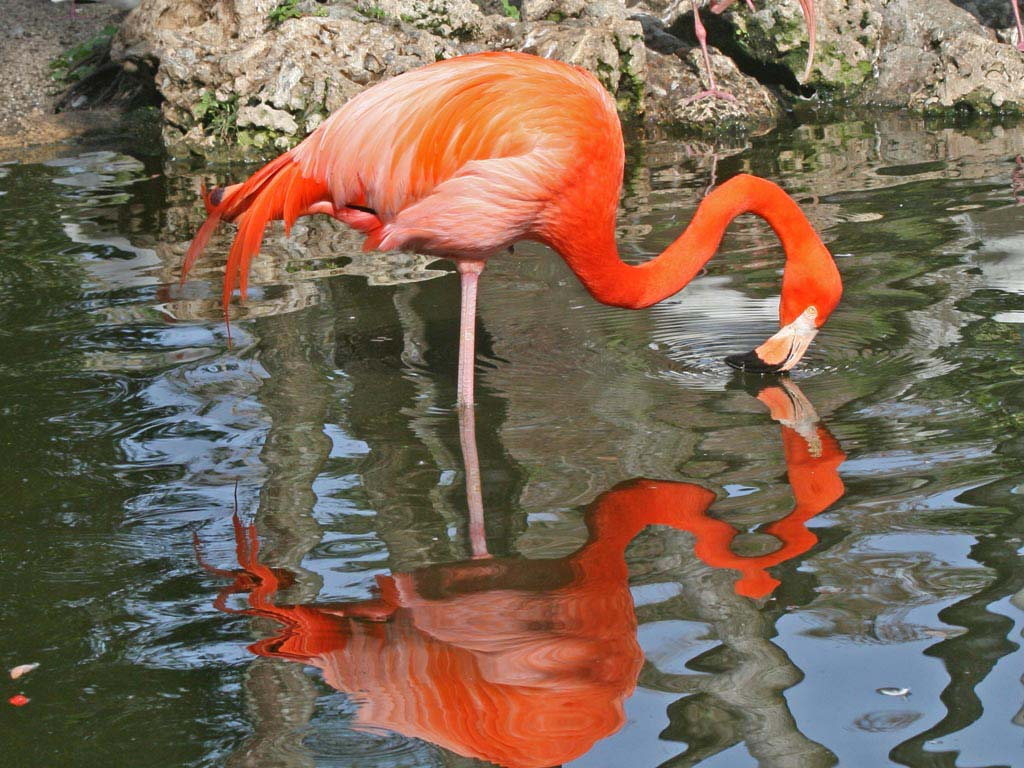
American flamingo, in an enclosure in Flamingo Gardens

Fauna include American flamingos, an American black bear, North American river otters, American alligators, bobcats, Florida panthers, turtles, peacocks, fish crows, bald eagles, owls, and other birds of prey. Additionally, exotic species like African spurred tortoises, keel-billed toucans, parrots, and macaws are kept.

The 25,000 square feet (2,300 m^{2}) Everglades aviary houses one of the largest collections of birds and animals in the United States. Species include American white pelicans, brown pelicans, wood storks, American white ibises, roseate spoonbills, great blue herons, black-crowned night herons, fulvous whistling ducks, anhinga, double-crested cormorants, and laughing gulls. The aviary exhibits four native Florida ecosystems: coastal prairie, mangrove swamp, sub-tropical hardwood hammock, and sawgrass marsh.

== See also ==
- List of botanical gardens in the United States
