= Raymond Township, Champaign County, Illinois =

Raymond Township
- Township
- Location in Champaign County

- Champaign County's location in Illinois
- Coordinates: 39°55′31″N 88°04′05″W
- Country: United States
- State: Illinois
- County: Champaign

Area
  - Total: 36.25 sq mi (93.9 km^{2})
  - Land: 36.25 sq mi (93.9 km^{2})
  - Water: 0 sq mi (0 km^{2}) 0%
- Elevation: 666 ft (203 m)

Population (2020)
  - Total: 354
  - Density: 9.77/sq mi (3.77/km^{2})
- Time zone: UTC-6 (CST)
  - Summer (DST): UTC-5 (CDT)
- FIPS code: 17-019-62952
- Website: raymondtownship.org

Raymond Township is a township in Champaign County, Illinois, USA. As of the 2020 census, its population was 354 and it contained 175 housing units.

== History ==
Raymond Township formed from a portion of Sidney Township on an unknown date.

== Geography ==
Raymond is Township 17 North, Range 10 East of the Third Principal Meridian.

According to the 2010 census, the township has a total area of 36.25 square miles (93.9 km^{2}), all land.

=== Cities and towns ===
- Longview

=== Cemeteries ===
Immaculate Conception Cemetery is in Bongard.

== Demographics ==
As of the 2020 census there were 354 people, 118 households, and 78 families residing in the township. The population density was 9.76 inhabitants per square mile (3.77/km^{2}). There were 175 housing units at an average density of 4.83 per square mile (1.86/km^{2}). The racial makeup of the township was 96.33% White, 0.56% African American, 0.00% Native American, 0.00% Asian, 0.00% Pacific Islander, 0.00% from other races, and 3.11% from two or more races. Hispanic or Latino of any race were 0.28% of the population.

There were 118 households, out of which 40.70% had children under the age of 18 living with them, 60.17% were married couples living together, 3.39% had a female householder with no spouse present, and 33.90% were non-families. 13.60% of all households were made up of individuals, and 6.80% had someone living alone who was 65 years of age or older. The average household size was 2.86 and the average family size was 3.19.

The township's age distribution consisted of 25.5% under the age of 18, 6.8% from 18 to 24, 27% from 25 to 44, 31.8% from 45 to 64, and 8.9% who were 65 years of age or older. The median age was 36.8 years. For every 100 females, there were 83.2 males. For every 100 females age 18 and over, there were 79.3 males.

The median income for a family in the township was $132,583. Males had a median income of $40,625 versus $65,500 for females. The per capita income for the township was $30,100. About 7.7% of families and 14.8% of the population were below the poverty line, including 17.8% of those under age 18 and 10.0% of those age 65 or over.

Historical population
| Census | Pop. | Note | %± |
|---|---|---|---|
| 2010 | 418 | | — |
| 2020 | 354 | | −15.3% |
U.S. Decennial Census
