= El Ajo Festival =

Music festival in Spain

Coordinates: 40°20′26.9″N 1°06′17.8″W

Peña El Ajo
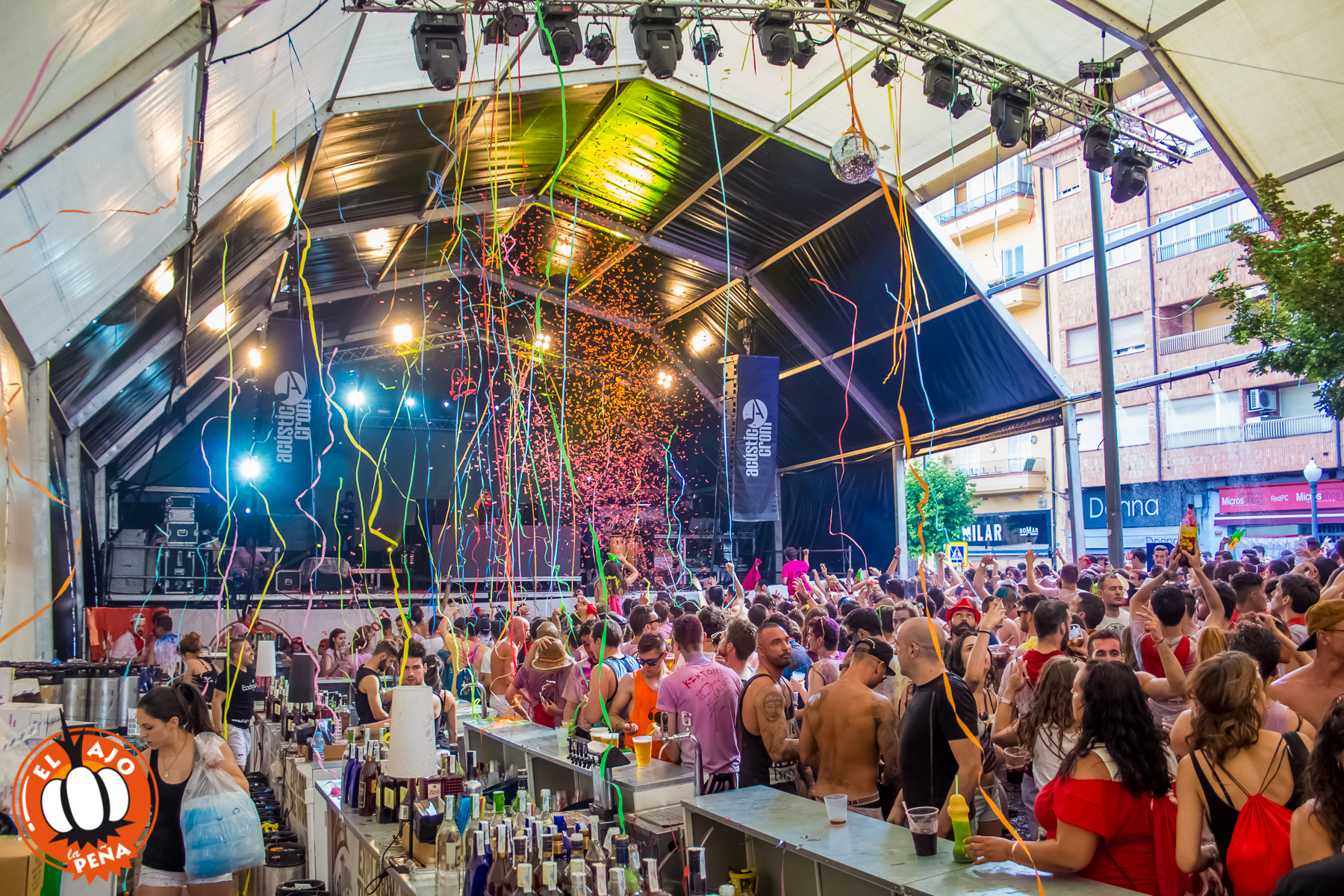
- Genre: Electronic dance music · Rock · alternative rock · ska · punk rock · heavy metal · pop · synthpop · reggae · hip hop · indie · world · electronic
- Dates: July · 5|6|7|8 · 2024
- Locations: Teruel, Aragon, Spain
- Years active: 1969, 1975 - present
- Website: Official website

Peña El Ajo is a cultural association formed in Teruel (Spain), in 1969. It is in the central and the oldest part of the City, "La Vaquilla Del Ángel". The association is in charge of scheduling a music festival which lasts for 4 days (Friday to Monday), over the weekend closest to 10 July. The staff of the association is responsible for planning, coordinating and monitoring the different musical event.

This association creates a diverse environment of music that takes place in the center of the Teruel’s city. As of 2016, it is located in a parking area in Ronda Ambeles. In case it is raining the musical events are covered by a huge tent. Above all, this association is characterized by the great influx of young public from their own city as well as the surrounding provinces. Throughout its 43 year history, it has been singled out by its eclecticism when it has designed the musical schedule.

All performances are free of charge and freely accessible. They play their shows on one stage where there is a variety of musical styles including: electronic music, independent music, mix music, reggae, rock, hip hop, drum and bass, dubstep, dub, ska, folk and techno.

In recent years, on its stage people have had the opportunity to see artists such as Yves V, Juicy M, Benny Page, Dubioza Kolektiv, The Skatalites, Los Caligaris, Djs From Mars, Rayden, La Pegatina, La Raiz, Green Valley, Talco, Juanito Makandé, SFDK, La P'tite Fumée, Boikot, La Fuga, Albert Neve, Albel Ramos, JP Candela, Brian Cross, Sak Noel, The Zombie Kids, Uri Sàbat, Adrian Fyrla, Marea, DJ Nano, Michenlo, Les Castizos, Gomad!&Monster, Itaca Band, Alamedadosoulna, Always Drinking Marching Band, Dani Moreno, Itaca Band, Eskorzo, Nativa, Muyayo Rif, Abel The Kid, La Banda del Surdo, Brincadeira, Sidral Brass Band, Eyes of Providence, Bandarra Street Orkesta, La Sra. Tomasa, Trashtucada, and Pink Puffers.

== History ==
The first meeting place of the association was the stairs of the former municipal market in Domingo Gascón square. The name of “El Ajo” was chosen in order to give a spicier tone to the party.

However, one year after its creation, El Ajo disappeared in 1970 because its partners were students, so they had to leave the city. For this reason, all the bulk of the effort failed as only a few people stayed in Teruel. In spite of the problems, El Ajo was restarted in 1975 by a young group who decided to continue with the organization of the association. They are aged between 15 and 19 years and consequently youth is one of the characteristics of the association. This year the association has 150 partners, when they are located by the town hall in the Cristo Rey Square. El Ajo was the first association which had brass bands and, in 1988, DJ' s and audiovisual montage. The next year, the council ordered them to change location. Finally, in 1977, El Ajo settled for the first time in Amantes Square and remained there until 2005 because the square had to be restored due to its historic importance. The next site was located nearer to where the association is now. Despite the large size of the site, El Ajo was getting more crowded because it was the ideal point where more than 40.000 people like gathering and enjoying the music during four days.

Finally, the council announced that they would have to abandon the site due to the fact that a park was going to be located in this area. Then, they were relocated to the site where the association is located now. They found several problems such as getting the support of the council, finding a supply of electricity and annoying the neighbourhood. As this new site is much bigger, the association has considerably increased the number of partners (800), as well as the public during the performances. Any local person has the opportunity to become a partner and can make a choice of different music proposals.

== Gallery ==
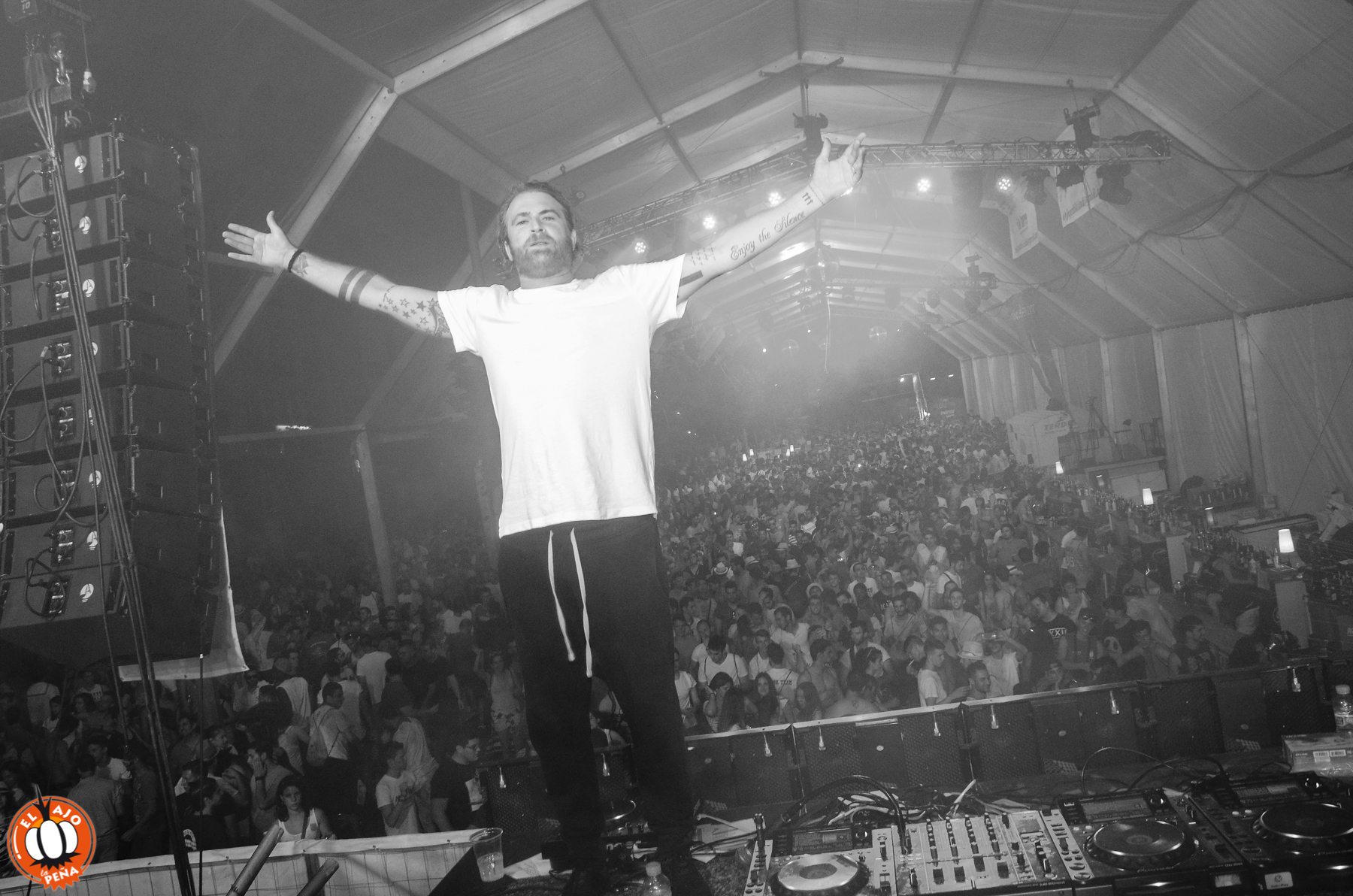

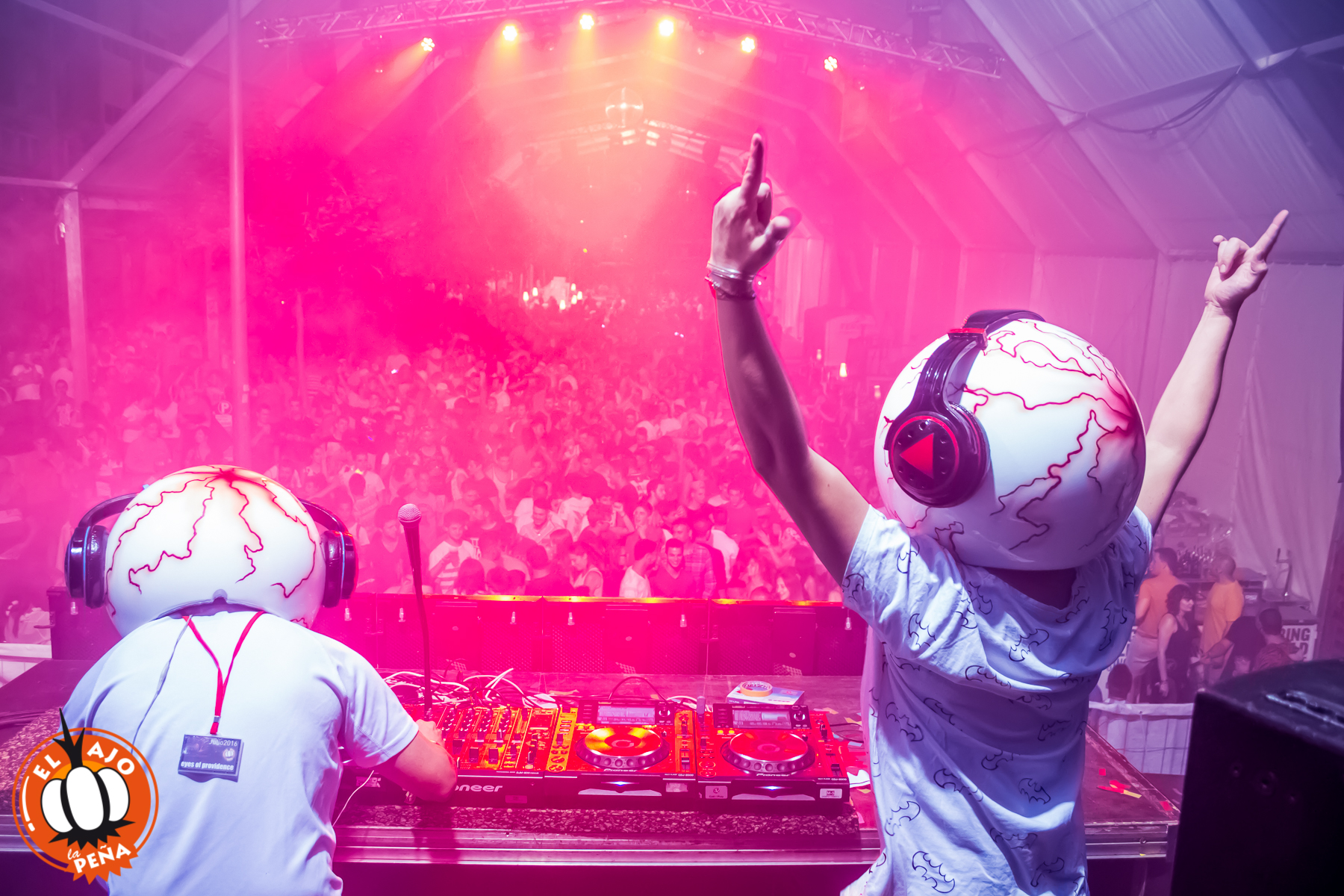

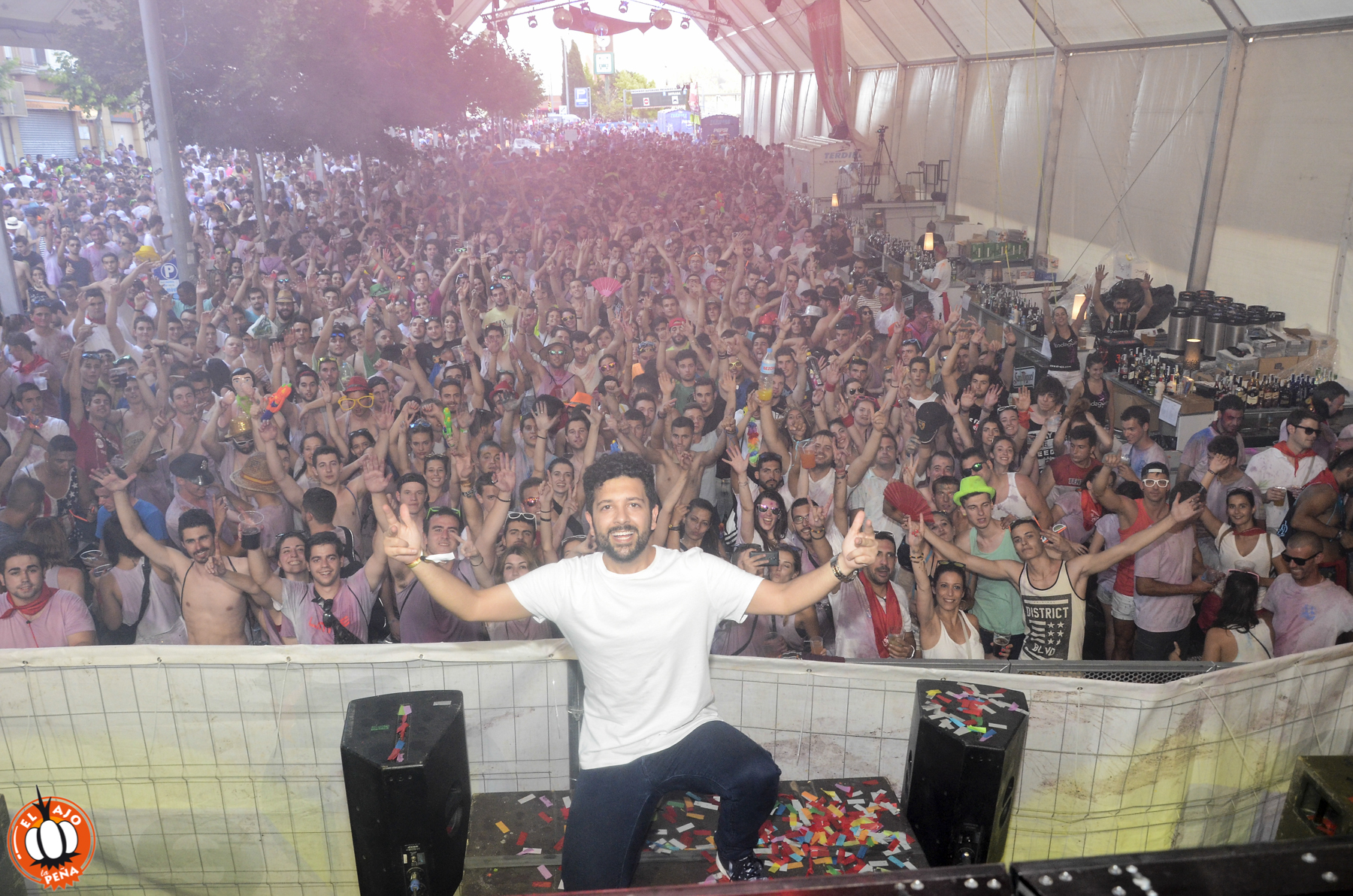

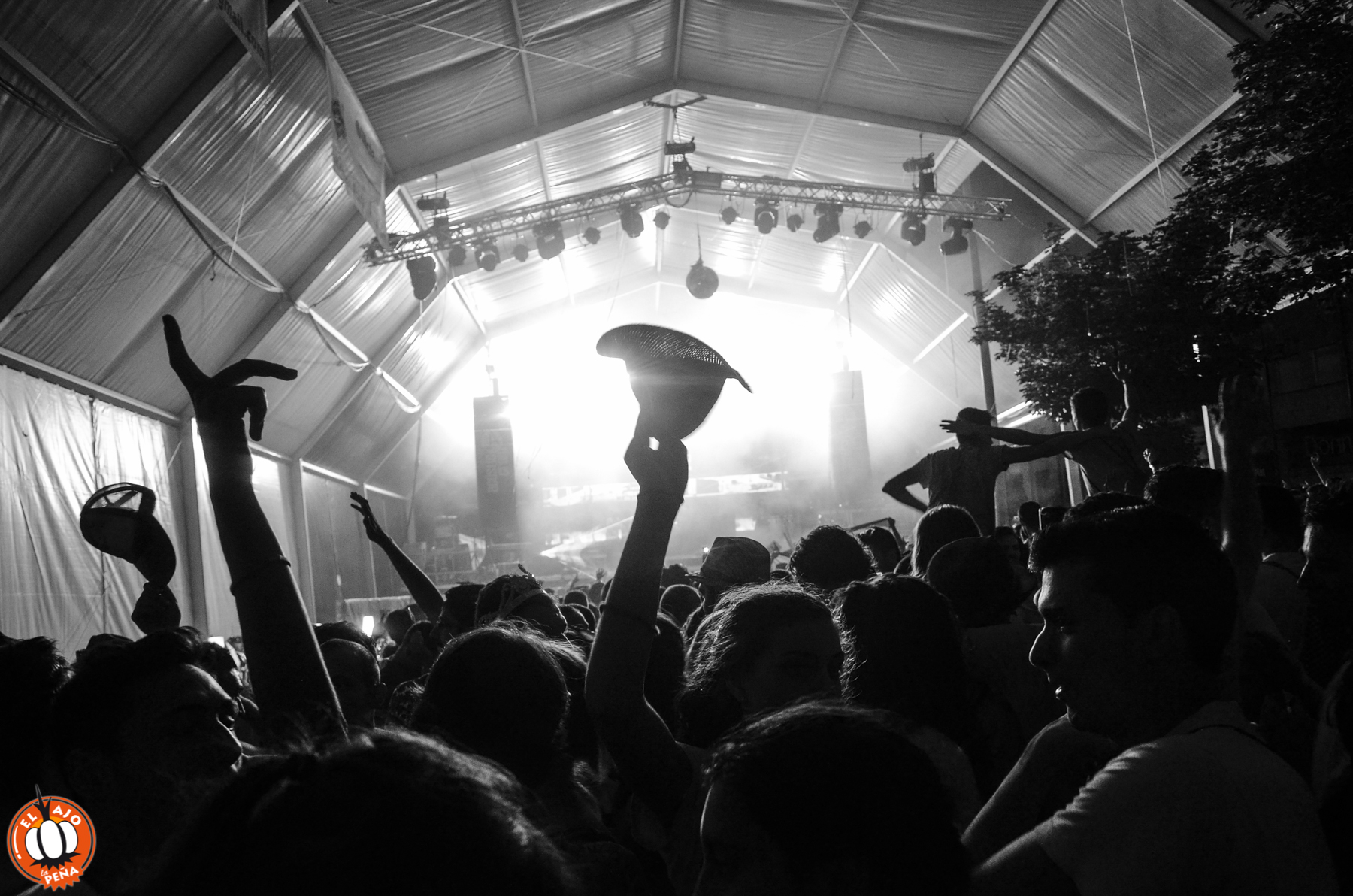

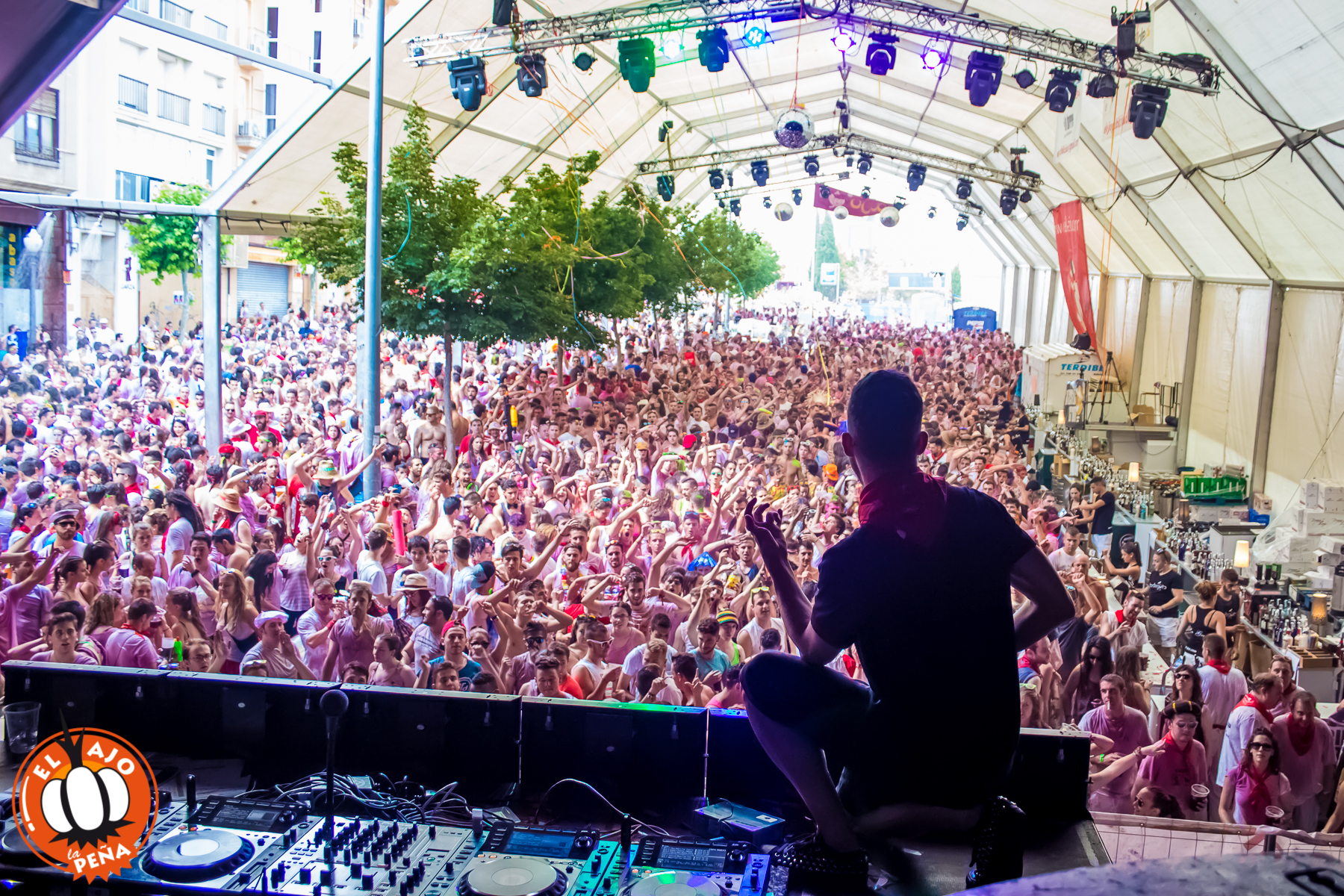

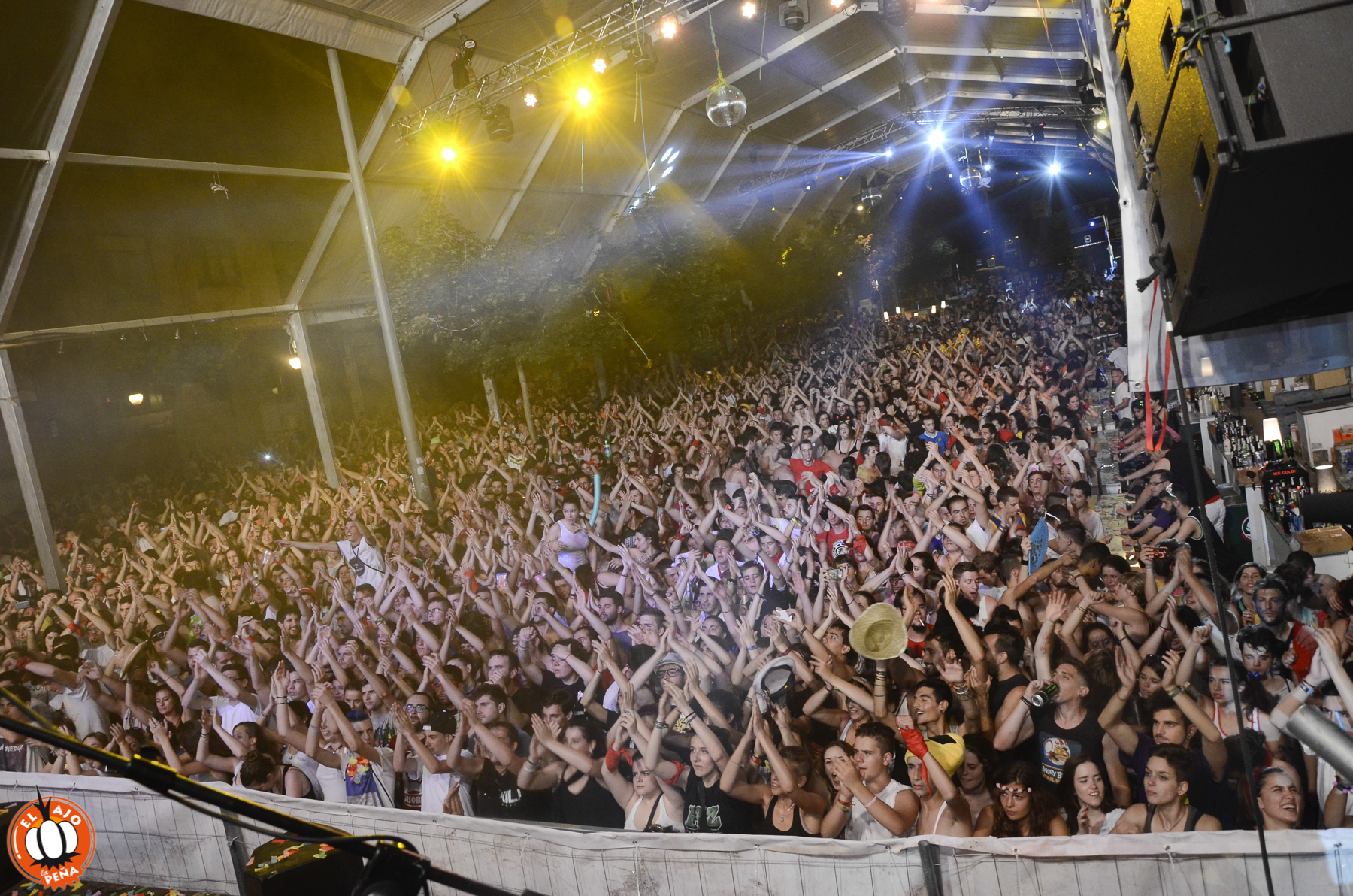

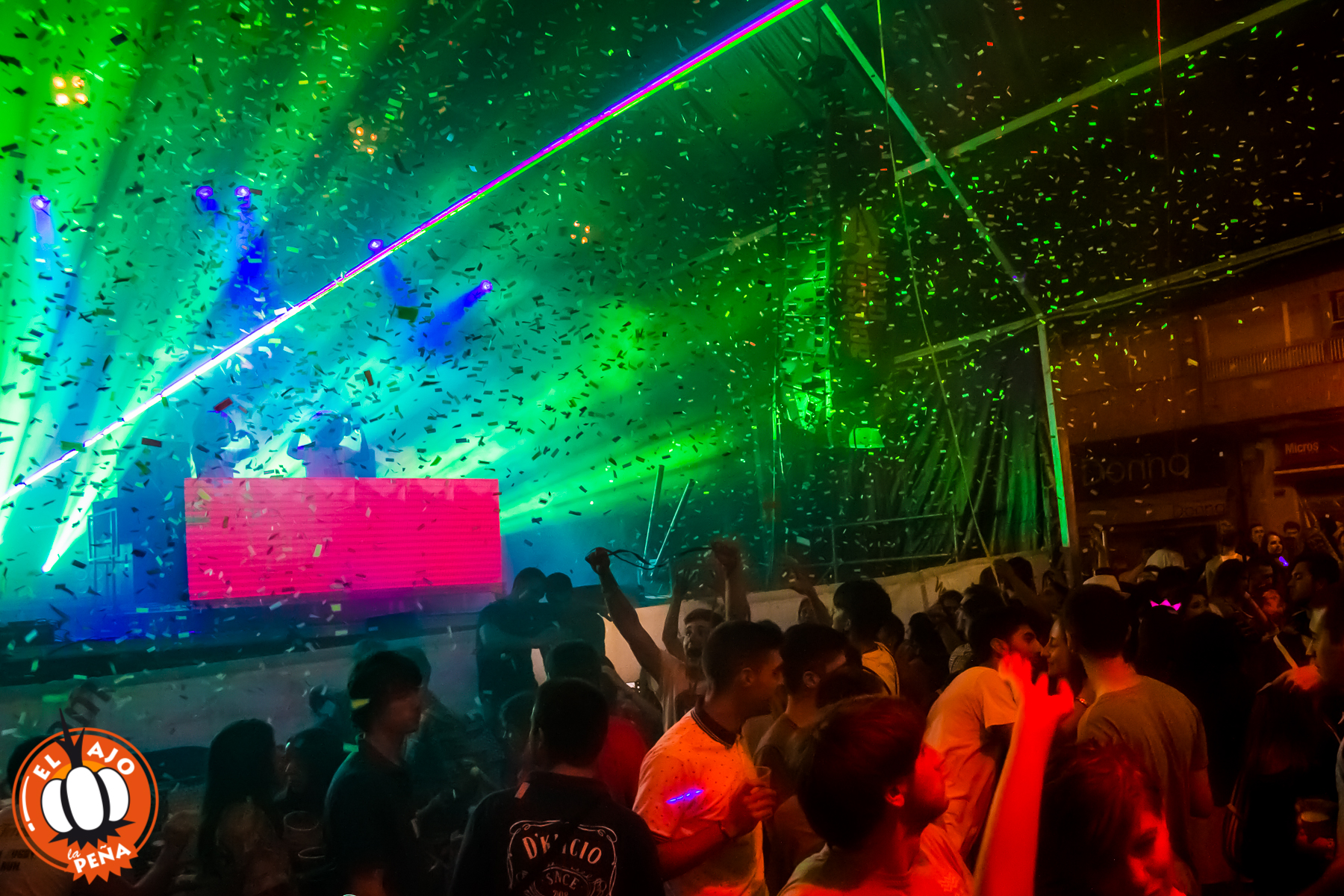

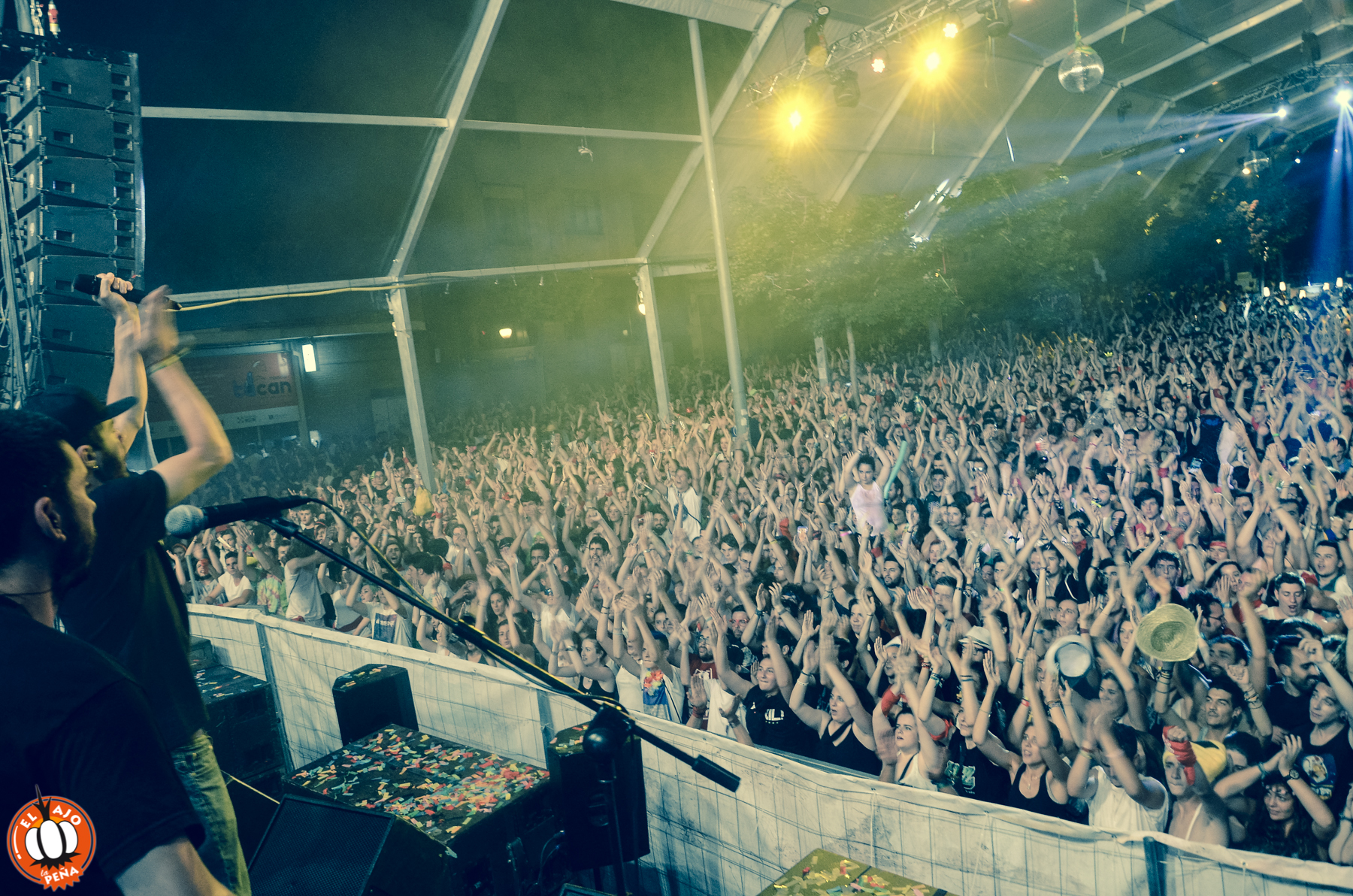

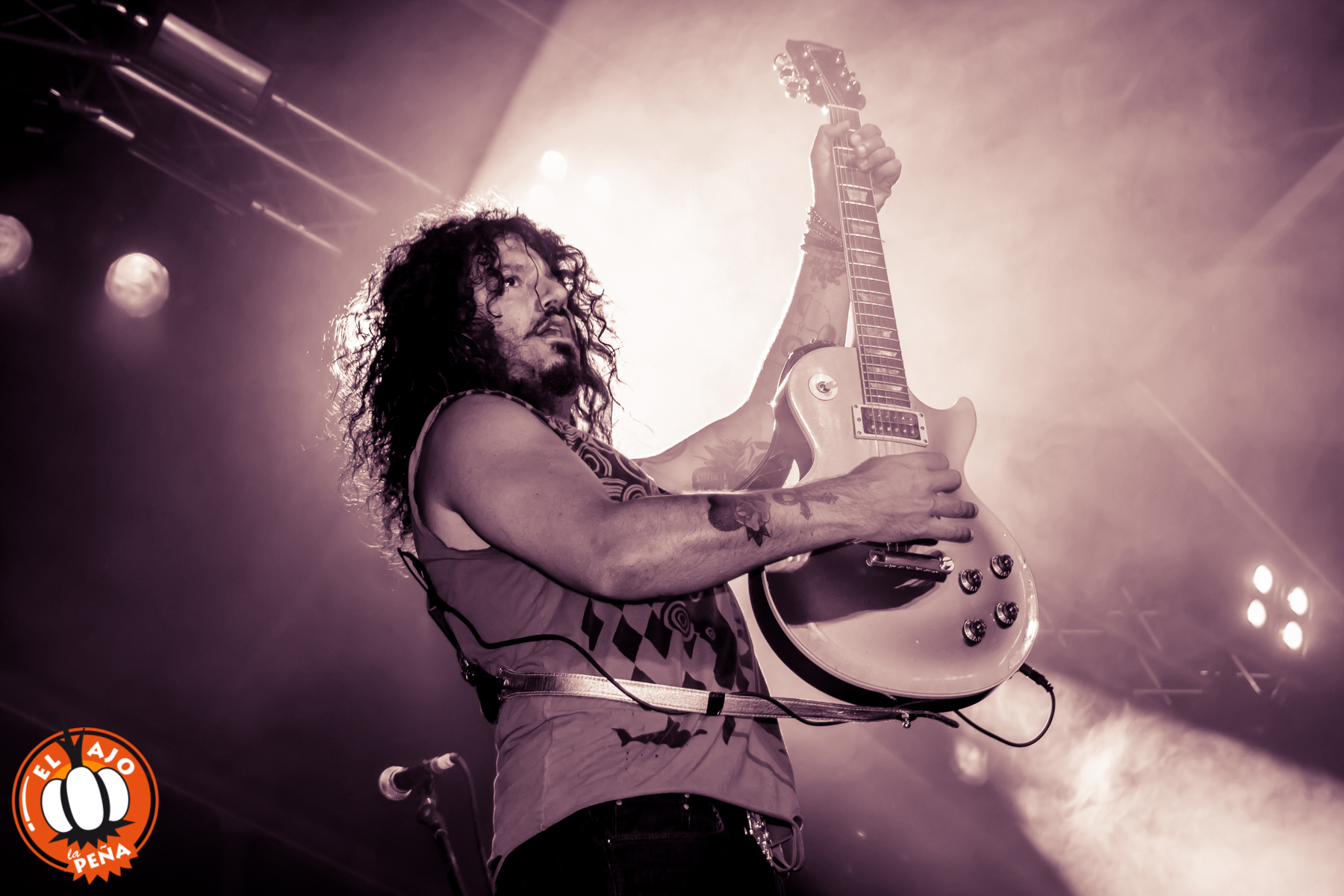

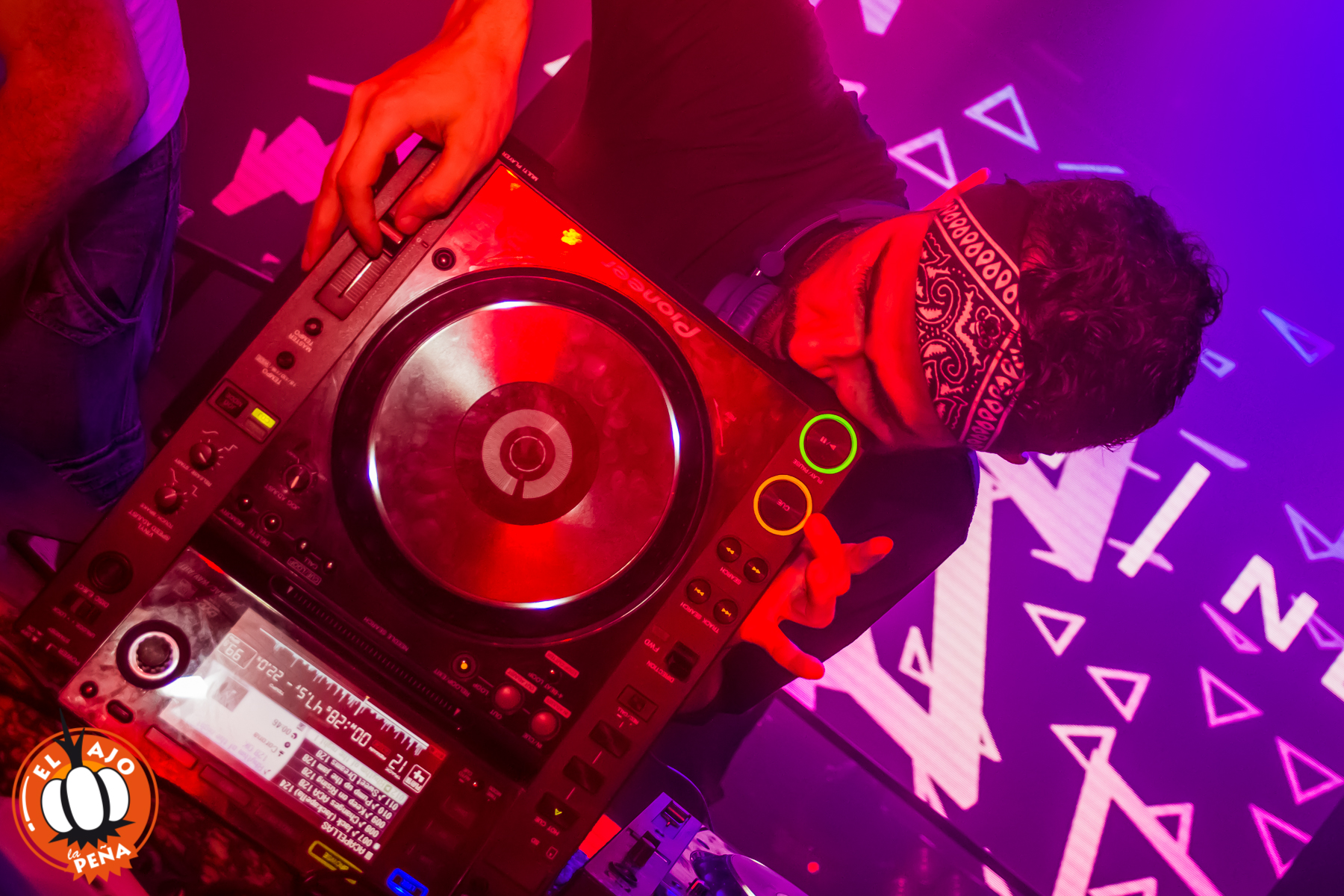

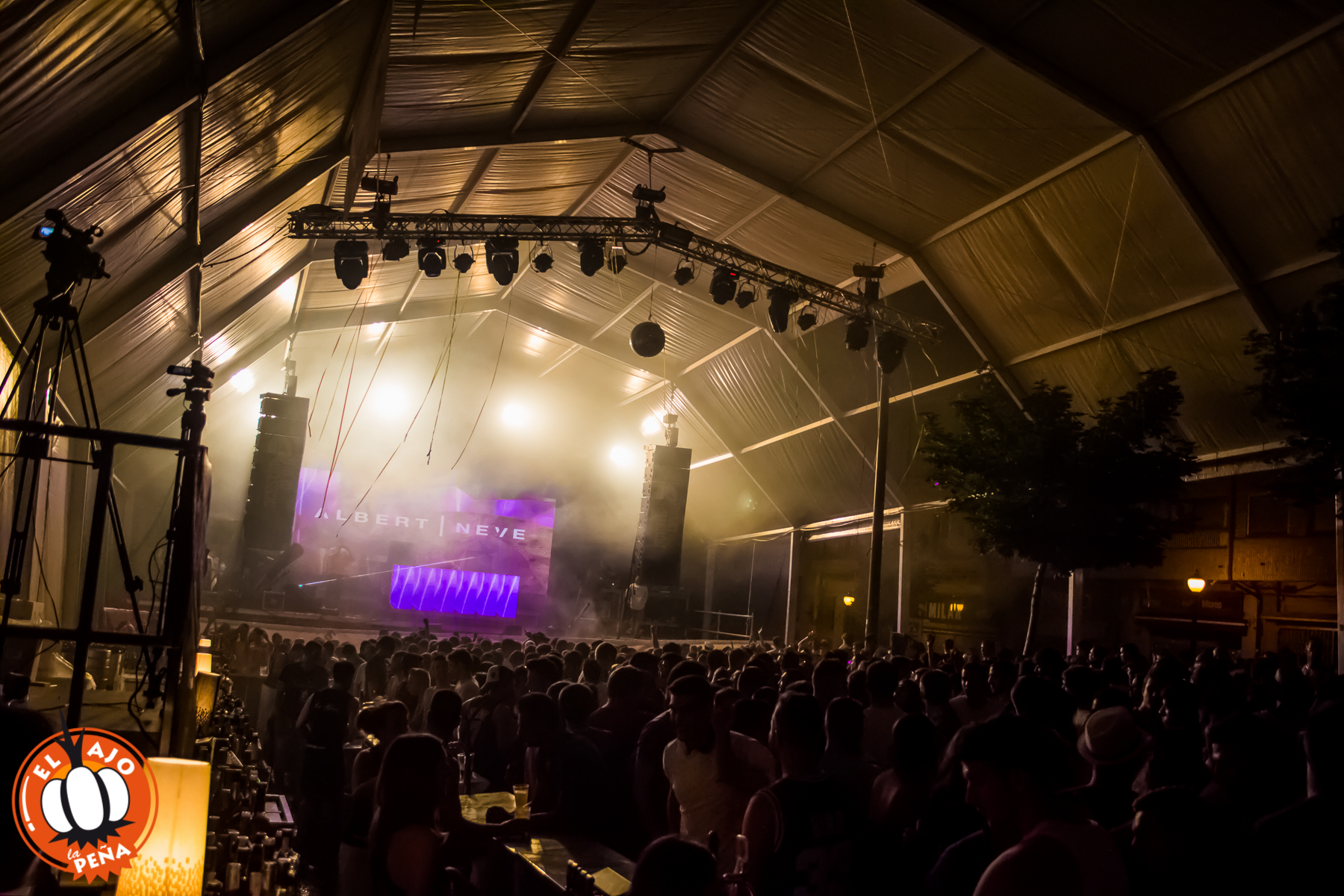

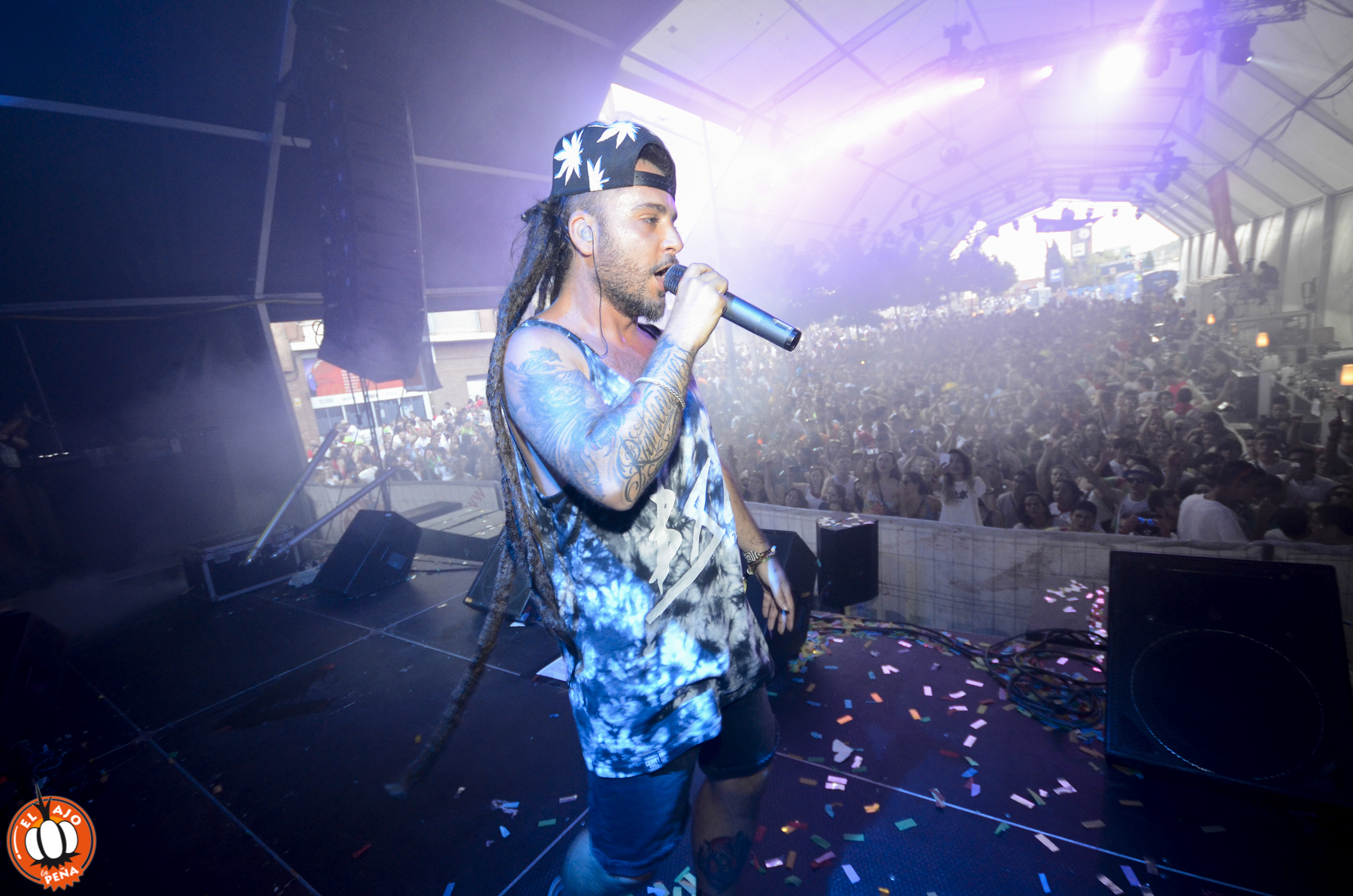

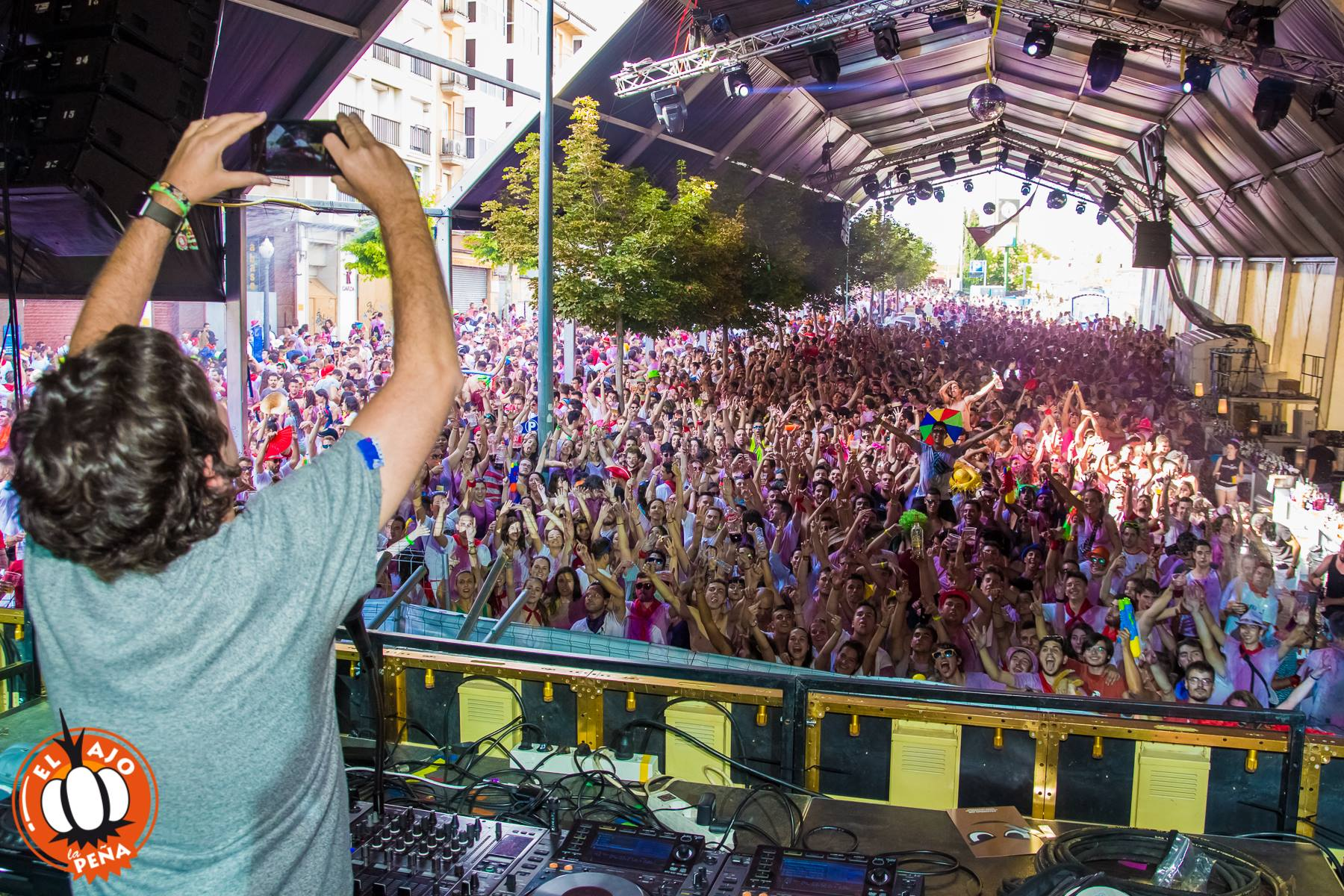

== Bibliography ==
VICENTE, N.(2010), 50 años de historia de las peñas vaquilleras turolenses (Vol. X): El Ajo | El Agüelo | El Torpedo | El Disfrute

HERNÁNDEZ, C. (1999), La Vaquilla del Ángel, autor-editor, Teruel.

PASCUAL, M. (1999), Estampas vaquilleras de Teruel, Certeza, Zaragoza.

PASCUAL, M. (2002), Vaquilleros del Torico, Certeza, Zaragoza.

VICENTE, N. (2002–2008), Cincuenta años de historia de las peñas taquilleras turolenses, de 1942 a 1992, 6 vol, Aragón Vivo, Teruel.

VICENTE, N. y MARZO, M. (1999), Peña “Los 13”. Su historia y aportación a la Vaquilla, Interpeñas, Teruel.
