= Road to Ultra =

- Status: Active
- Genre: Electronic music festival
- Locations: Seoul, South Korea; Tokyo, Japan; Bogotá, Colombia; Santiago, Chile; Taipei, Taiwan; Manila, Philippines; San Juan, Puerto Rico; Lima, Peru; Santa Cruz, Bolivia; Asunción, Paraguay; Macau, China; Hong Kong, China; New Delhi, India; Mumbai, India; Hyderabad, India; Melbourne, Australia
- Organizer: Ultra Enterprises, Inc.
- Website: roadtoultra.com

Road to Ultra (RTU) events are one day, single-stage events created and founded by the team behind the electronic dance music festival, Ultra Music Festival. Stage designs are also curated by the Ultra Worldwide team and are adapted to accommodate the needs of indoor and outdoor venues. RTU made its debut in 2012 in Seoul, Korea leading up to the second edition of Ultra Korea, which took place the following year. Since then, Road to Ultra events have landed in Thailand, Colombia, Peru, Macau, Japan, Taiwan, Paraguay, Puerto Rico, Bolivia, the Philippines, Singapore, Chile, and Hong Kong. As of 2017, new Road to Ultra events have taken place in India in September 2017, as well as Australia in February 2018.

== Road to Ultra: Australia ==
During Ultra Music Festival's 19th edition this past March, it was revealed that Australia would be joining the Ultra Worldwide family. On 10 April 2017, the official announcement was made that Melbourne will be hosting a Road to Ultra event in February 2018. It was confirmed that it will be held at the Sidney Myer Music Bowl on February 24. The inaugural festival was headlined by international artists Afrojack, Axwell, Carnage (DJ), KSHMR and Andrew Rayel. Following the Road to Ultra: Australia 2018 event, Ultra Australia took place in Sydney & Melbourne in 2019 and 2020.

== Road to Ultra: Bolivia ==
The Road to Ultra: Bolivia was held on 3 October 2015 at the Estadio Ramon Tahuichi Aguilera in Santa Cruz de la Sierra, Bolivia. The event included artists such as Kryoman, GTA, Paul van Dyk, Fedde Le Grand, and Afrojack.

The second edition of Road to Ultra: Bolivia took place on 14 October 2016 at the Ventura Arena in Santa Cruz, Bolivia. The lineup for the 2016 edition of Road to Ultra: Bolivia was announced on 18 August 2016 and included the likes of Hardwell, Dash Berlin, Chris Schweizer, Tom & Collins, the Zombie Kids, and more local supporting acts.

== Road to Ultra: Chile ==
The Road to Ultra: Chile was held on 21 February 2014 at Ritoque KM. 3 in Viña del Mar, Chile. The event took place after the debut of Ultra Chile during 2013 located in Santiago, Chile. The Road to Ultra: Chile included artists like Vives & Forero, Soul & Senses, Heatbeat, Pendulum, Tiesto, and W&W.

Road to Ultra: Chile took place this year on 8 October 2016 at the Movistar Arena in Santiago, Chile. The lineup for Road to Ultra: Chile's second edition was announced on 25 August 2016 and included Martin Garrix, Carnage, Dash Berlin, Deorro, Jauz, and other local supporting acts.

== Road to Ultra: Colombia ==
The Road to Ultra: Colombia took place across two days—20–21 February 2014 at the Autodromo de Tocancipa in Bogota, Colombia. Featured artists for the two-day event included Hardwell, Hercules & Love Affair, Nicky Romero, Showtek, W&W, Ferry Corsten, Laidback Luke, Nicole Moudaber, Green Velvet, and Guy J. Over 15,000 people were in attendance for the first and only Road to Ultra in Colombia.

On 6 June 2022, it was officially announced that Road to Ultra: Colombia will be returning for a second edition at Llanogrande in Medellin on 7 October 2022 respectively.

== Road to Ultra: Hong Kong ==
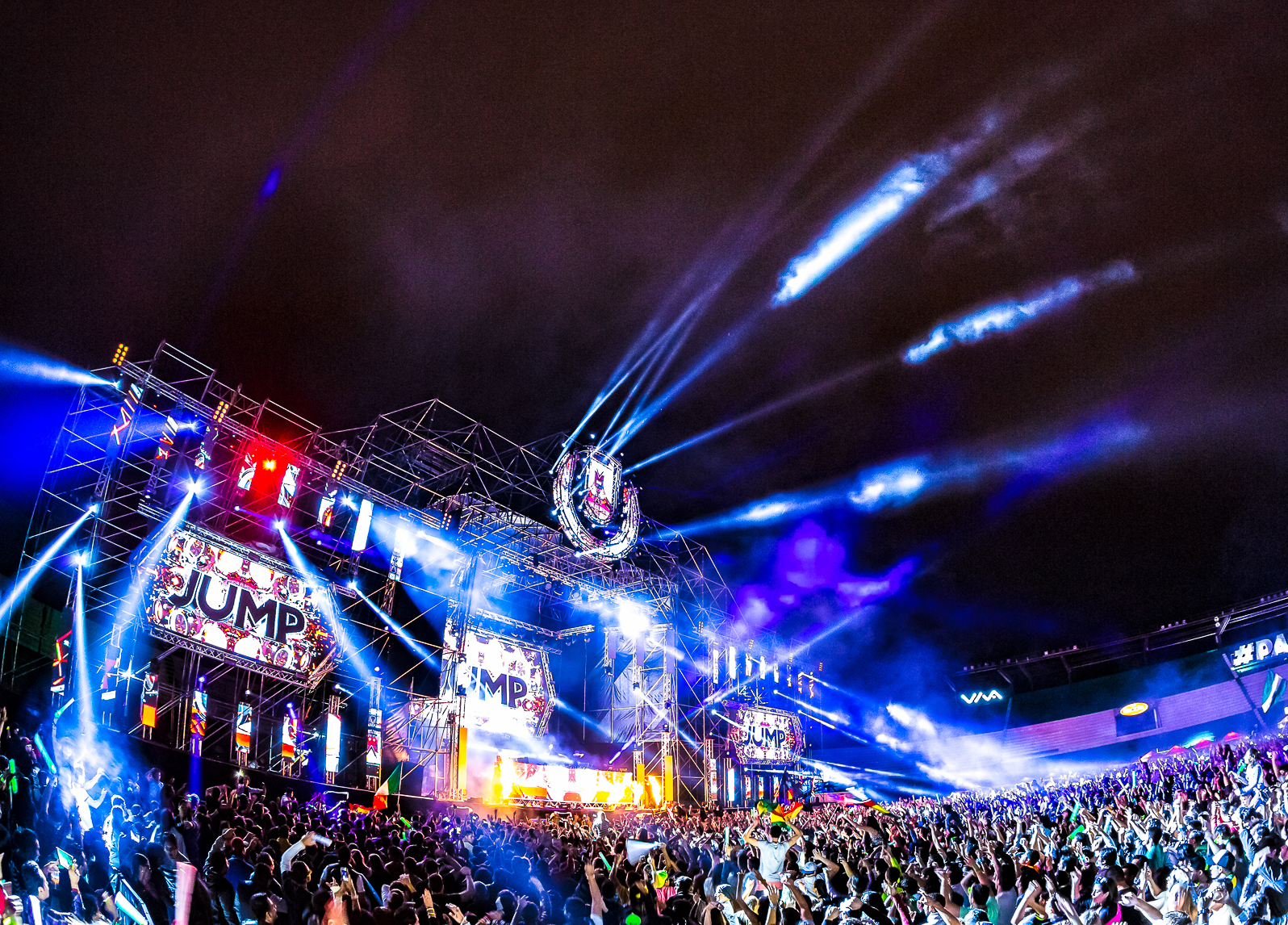
Road to Ultra in Santa Cruz, Bolivia

The Road to Ultra: Macau, now known as Road to Ultra: Hong Kong, was held on 12 June 2015 at the Club Cubic and City of Dreams Complex in Macau, China. Featured artists that played the event included Nicky Romero, Porter Robinson, 2ManyDJs, DVBBS, Tom Swoon, Justin Oh, and more regional support. The event's debut sold out and was moved to Hong Kong for 2016.

For 2016, the Road to Ultra headed to Hong Kong for the first time. The Road to Ultra: Hong Kong took place on 17 September 2016 at the Nursery Park located in the West Kowloon Cultural District. The lineup for the event included artists like Knife Party, Martin Garrix, Nero (live), Carnage, Galantis, Jauz, Marshmello, and Thomas Jack.

On 6 May 2024, it was officially announced that Road to Ultra: Hong Kong will be upgraded to Ultra Hong Kong and will be held on 14 September.

== Road to Ultra: India ==
During Ultra Music Festival's 19th edition this past March, it was revealed that India would be joining the Ultra Worldwide family. On 10 April 2017, the official announcement was made that New Delhi and Mumbai will be hosting Road to Ultra events in September 2017. The Road to Ultra: India (Mumbai) took place at the Mahalaxmi Race Course in Mumbai on 7 September 2017, while the Road to Ultra: India (New Delhi), took place on 8 September 2017 at India Exposition Mart in Greater Noida.

On 27 January 2020, it was officially announced that Road to Ultra: India will be returning for a second edition at Hyderabad and Delhi on 7 & 8 March 2020 respectively. Alesso, KSHMR, Nicky Romero, Vini Vici, Mykris, Olly Esse, and Siana Catherine will perform.

== Road to Ultra: Japan ==
Leading up to the debut of Ultra Japan in Tokyo, Japan, the Road to Ultra: Tokyo took place on 20 December 2013 at the nightclub, AgeHa. The lineup included the likes of Above & Beyond, Showtek, and a myriad of local talent. Since then, Road to Ultra has not taken place in Japan.

== Road to Ultra: Korea ==
Following the first Ultra Korea back in 2012, the Road to Ultra: Korea took place on 8 December 2012 at the Jamsil Indoor Stadium in Seoul, Korea. Artists for the first and only RTU Korea included Dillon Francis, R3hab, Major Lazer, Hardwell, and Diplo. Since then, Road to Ultra has not taken place in Korea.

== Road to Ultra: Paraguay ==
The first edition of Road to Ultra: Paraguay took place on 10 October 2014 at the Rakiura Resort in Asuncion, Paraguay. Artists announced on the bill for the first RTU Paraguay included Afrojack, Steve Angello, Dash Berlin, Borgore, Nervo, Sunnery James & Ryan Marciano, Festa Bros, Heatbeat, Kryoman, The Zombie Kids, and DBSTF. Paraguay's RTU debut welcomed more than 18,000 people in attendance to the Raikura Resort.

The Road to Ultra: Paraguay returned to the Rakiura Resort for its second edition on 9 October 2015. Featured artists who played the event in Asuncion included Sebastian Ingrosso, Knife Party, Dash Berlin, Fedde Le Grand, Paul van Dyk, Dzeko & Torres, GTA, Heatbeat, and Vinai.

The third edition of Road to Ultra: Paraguay took place on 15 October 2016 in Asuncion, Paraguay at the Rakiura Resort. The lineup for Road to Ultra: Paraguay was announced on 30 August 2016 and featured Above & Beyond, Krewella (live), DJ Snake, Jauz, Markus Schulz, and other local supporting acts.

== Road to Ultra: Peru ==
The Road to Ultra: Peru took place on 7 October 2015 in Lima, Perú at the Explanada Costa Verde. The event featured the likes of Afrojack, Dash Berlin, Fedde Le Grand, Paul van Dyk, Dzeko & Torres, GTA, and Heatbeat. Over 20,000 people were in attendance for the first Road to Ultra in Peru.

The Road to Ultra: Peru once again took place at the Explanada Costa Verde in Lima, Perú on 7 October 2016, leading up to Ultra Brasil the following weekend, 14–15 October. The lineup for Road to Ultra: Peru was announced on 25 August 2016 and included Martin Garrix, Carnage, Dash Berlin, Deorro, Jauz, and many other local supporting acts. Over 25,000 people were in attendance for the second Road to Ultra in Peru.

== Road to Ultra: Philippines ==
The debut edition of Road to Ultra: Philippines was held on 26 September 2015 at the Mall of Asia Concert Grounds in Manila, Philippines. The event included the likes of Skrillex, A-Trak, Fedde Le Grand, Mija, Vicetone, W&W, and Zeds Dead.

The second edition of the Road to Ultra: Philippines took place at the Mall of Asia Arena in Manila on 17 September 2016. The lineup for the second edition of Road to Ultra: Philippines was announced in early July and featured Alesso, Hardwell, Tiesto, MOTi, and Fedde Le Grand. Due to weather conditions, Hardwell was not able to make it to the second edition of Road to Ultra: Philippines, therefore Jauz took his place for the event.

The third edition of the Road to Ultra: Philippines took place at the Mall of Asia Arena in Manila on 15 September 2017. The lineup for the third edition of Road to Ultra: Philippines was announced in early July and featured Hardwell, Zedd, Getter, Sam Feldt, and SHRKTOPS. Due to the weather conditions again, the production was decided to be held on Mall of Asia Arena instead on Mall of Asia Concert Grounds. This is the second time that it was held indoors instead outdoors.

== Road to Ultra: Puerto Rico ==
Road to Ultra: Puerto Rico took place on 2 October 2015 at the Convention District in San Juan, Puerto Rico. Featured artists for the event included Knife Party, Steve Angello, Fedde Le Grand, and W&W. Puerto Rico has been confirmed to host another Road to Ultra event in 2017.

== Road to Ultra: Taiwan ==
The first edition of Road to Ultra: Taiwan took place on 14 June 2014 at the Kaohsiung Exhibition Centre in Kaohsiung City, Taiwan. Artists on the lineup for the first edition of Road to Ultra: Taiwan included Above & Beyond, Chris Lake, Hard Rock Sofa, and Ummet Ozcan.

The second edition of Road to Ultra: Taiwan took place on 20 September 2015 at the Dajia Riverside Park in Taipei City, Taiwan. Road to Ultra: Taiwan featured the likes of Ansolo, Robin Schulz, Fedde Le Grand, Afrojack, Alesso, Armin van Buuren, and more local talent.

The third edition of Road to Ultra: Taiwan took place on 11 September 2016 at Dajia Riverside Park. The lineup included Afrojack, Alesso, deadmau5, DJ Snake, W&W, Quintino, and Raiden.

On 7 October 2020, Ultra announced that a fourth edition of the event would take place on 14 November, again at Dajia Riverside Park. It would only the fifth Ultra event held in 2020, as the majority of them (including the flagship Miami event) were cancelled due to the COVID-19 pandemic. The pandemic in Taiwan has been largely controlled, which allowed health authorities to begin permitting in-person music festivals with safety precautions. On 29 October, the country would mark its 200th consecutive day without a locally transmitted case. The event was headlined by Alesso, Kayzo, Slander, and Vini Vici. Following the event, it was reported that four performers had been fined for violation of Taiwanese health orders, as they had met in a common area without masks before the mandatory 14-day self-isolation period had elapsed.

== Road to Ultra: Thailand ==
Road to Ultra: Thailand took place on 24 September 2014 at Hall 106 at Bitec Bangna in Bangkok, Thailand. Artists on the lineup for the first edition of Road to Ultra: Thailand included W&W, Alesso, Martin Garrix, and Fedde Le Grand.

The second edition of Road to Ultra: Thailand took place on 12 June 2015 at the Bitec Convention Center in Bangkok, Thailand. Artists played to a fully packed crowd as the second edition sold out. Artists on the bill for Road to Ultra: Thailand in 2015 included Alesso, Knife Party, Adventure Club, Galantis, Laidback Luke, Nervo, and Quintino.

As for 2016, Road to Ultra: Thailand took place on 11 June 2016 at the Bitec Convention Center in Bangkok, Thailand. Artists who played the third edition of Road to Ultra: Thailand included Avicii, Martin Garrix, Jauz, Ansolo, and Sunnery James & Ryan Marciano.

== See also ==
- Ultra Music Festival
- Russell Faibisch
- Ultra Brasil
- Ultra Buenos Aires
- Ultra Chile
- Ultra Japan
- Ultra Korea
- Ultra Japan
- Ultra Singapore
- Ultra South Africa
- Ultra Europe
- Ultra Bali
