= La Excepción =

Spanish rap group

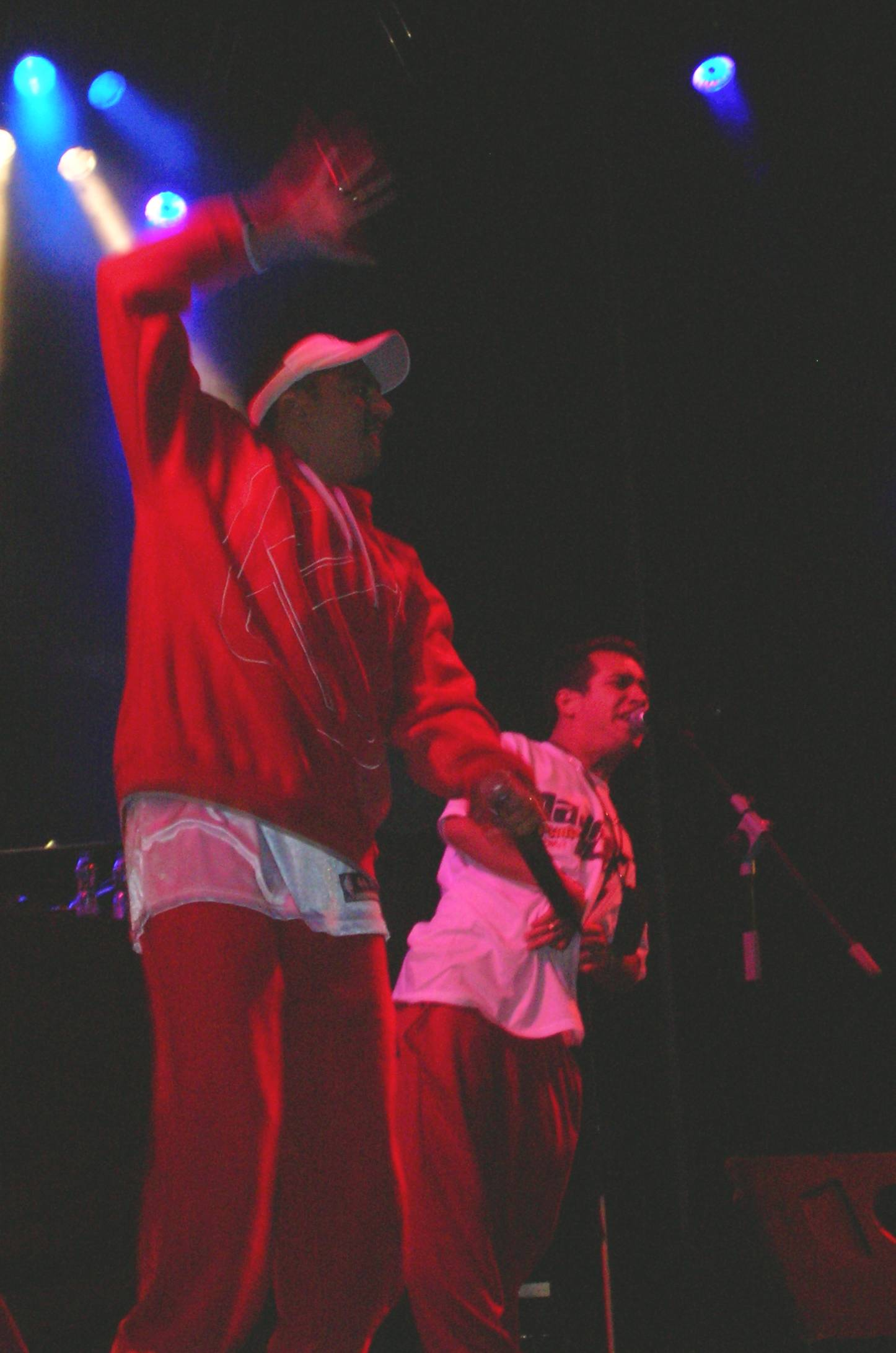
- Gitano Antón, microphone in hand, and Langui with microphone attached

Background information
- Origin: Madrid, Spain
- Genres: Spanish hip hop
- Years active: 2003–present
- Members: El Langui; Gitano Antón; La dako style

La Excepción que Confirma la Regla (The Exception That Proves The Rule; often shortened to La Excepción) is a rap group from Madrid. The band is composed of two MCs: El Langui (Juan Manuel Montilla), and Gitano Antón (Antonio Moreno), and one DJ: DJ La dako style (Javier Ibañez).

== Biography ==
Ever since the formation of the group, La Excepción revolutionized the Spanish hip-hop scene, opening new doors with a self-assured and personal style that integrates flamenco, Cheli slang, and a lot of humor, without losing the social critique so central to hip-hop. Having a "local" identity, they have made a universal rap that has become popular around the whole country and has achieved rankings not normally held by hip-hop. They won Best Disc of the Year in Rolling Stone Magazine for their first work "Cata Cheli" and Best New Group from PEMOC (Group of Musical Journalists)^{please cite the source information}.

They have known each other since childhood, and began testing the waters with the rest of their friends in their amateur group "Amenaza Criminal". With time, only the actual members of the group continued in the world of hip-hop, completing the formation of La Excepción. They discovered they could make rap using their own gypsy slang, and they continued to polish their style in small concerts. In one of these they met MC and producer Frank T, who helped them make their first single "En tu carro paio!" (2002) and then their first record, "Cata Cheli", as well as interpreting with them the song "El negro, el cojo y el gitano". In addition to the basis provided by Frank T, they relied upon the French musician Super Jeff Dominguez, to mix their first CD. Their success among critics and sales has led them to perform in festivals across the county, such Viña Rock, the Monegros Desert Festival, and the Urban Culture de Madrid. All this brought about the re-release of the disc with a DVD and two new tracks.

La Excepción are teetotal towards drugs and alcohol. Their lyrics show a sense of commitment to "El Barrio" (the hood), happiness, and a positive attitude towards life and its hardships. Much of their music has tones of "El Langui", that in "Zapato ortopédico" ("Orthopedic Shoe"), jeers at his misfortune of being paralyzed, and the Gypsy Anton, that in "Nos late fuerte" ("It Barks At Us Loudly"), and with the help of Antonio Carmona (Ketama) also comments on the bad reputation of the Gypsies.

In May 2006, their second disc was released, produced by Frank T and Óscar "Acción Sánchez", called ""Aguantando el Tiron"" ("Withstanding The Pull"), with collaborations like that of MC Randy. Recently they won a prize Best Spanish Group at the MTV Europe Music Awards.

=== Discography ===
- "En tu carrino paio" (Zona Bruta, 2002)
- "Cata cheli" (Zona bruta, 2003)
- "Aguantando el tirón" (DRO/Zona bruta, 2006)
- " La verdad mas verdadera" (2009)
- "Cata Cheli" (2020)

=== Collaborations ===
- "Tenemos que hablar", with Presuntos Implicados
- "El negro el cojo y el gitano" with Frank T
- "Gorrión Bernardino" with Kultama
- "Nos late fuerte" with Antonio Carmona
- "Alma de molino" with Las Sister Bautista
- "Tres chaborros y un destino" with Rachid Kamikaze Baggasse
- "Hoy" with Aqeel
- "Agustito" with Ketama
- "Quijote Hip Hop" (with Zenit, Korazón Crudo y Artes, musical direction by Frank T)
- "Pirata del Estrecho", with Los Delinqüentes
- "Horizontes", with Rosendo (singer)
- "Ruido", with Muchachito Bombo Infierno
- "Rap Contra El Racismo", El Chojin and others
