= DJ Soda =

South Korean DJ

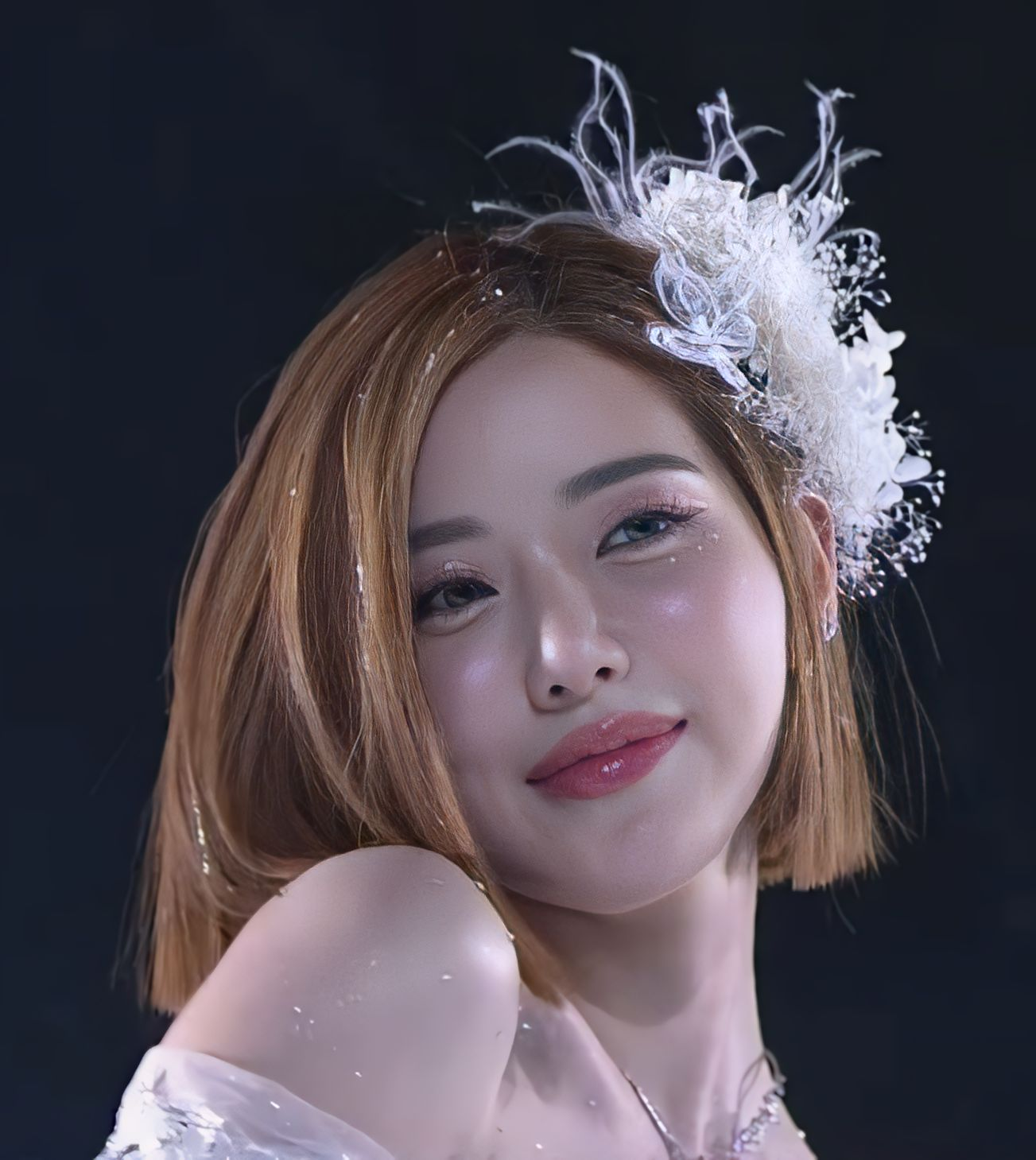
- DJ Soda in March 2024 opening the Kansai Collection fashion show

Background information
- Born: Hwang So-hee Min; April 7, 1988 (age 38); Seoul, South Korea
- Genres: Electronica; hip hop
- Occupations: DJ; model
- Labels: Highline; Warner Music Group

Korean name
- Hangul: 황소희
- RR: Hwang Sohui
- MR: Hwang Sohŭi

Hwang So-hee (Korean: 황소희, born April 7, 1988), known by her stage name DJ Soda, is a South Korean DJ. Hwang has built her reputation on being a frequent headliner for several Asian music festivals, including "S2O Songkran Musical Festival".

== Career ==
=== 2013–2017: Beginnings as a DJ ===
Hwang began work as a DJ in June 2013. Hwang began majorly touring with the Korea World DJ festival in 2015.

In June 2016, Hwang released her debut EP Closer through Warner Music Group. She also collaborated with labelmates Sistar.

In 2017, Hwang performed at the "S2O Songkran Music Festival" in Bangkok, Thailand.

=== 2018–present ===
In 2018, Hwang joined Starship Entertainment's new sublabel, "House of Music". She was later moved to another of Starship's sublabels, Highline Entertainment, as the earlier sublabel became defunct. In June, Hwang participated in "Ultra Music Festival Korea" (UMF). In July, she released a song in collaboration with Walshy Fire, titled "Never Let You In", which topped charts in Singapore, Malaysia, Hong Kong, and Indonesia.

In 2019, Hwang participated in Typhoon 8, a musical festival in Singapore. In December, Hwang performed at World Club Dome: Snow Edition held at the Jungfraujoch railway station in Switzerland.

In December, Hwang was awarded the culture prize in the indie category for the 9th Korea Hallyu Awards.

In April 2020, Hwang collaborated with Psycho Boys Club for the single "Over You". In November, Hwang collaborated with Kryoman and 1st Klase to release the song "Holding Back" featuring KYE. In 2019, she released a remix of the song by DJ Lost Chameleon.

In June 2020, she participated in Electric Blockaloo, a dance music livestream. In November, Hwang took part in her label Highline Entertainment's special performance The Color. She also released a single, "Shooting Star", on June 26.

In August 2021, she released a new single, "Okay!", with Lost Chameleon and Ahin of Momoland.

In November, DJ Soda ended her exclusive contract with Highline Entertainment.

== Philanthropy ==
On March 8, 2022, she donated ₩10 million won to the Hope Bridge Disaster Relief Association to help the victims of a massive wildfire that started in Uljin, Gyeongbuk and had spread to Samcheok, Gangwon. It was later extinguished on March 15, 2022.

== Sexual victimization ==
She performed on the third day of MUSIC CIRCUS '23 on August 13, 2023. When she interacted with the audience at the end of the performance, she reported on her SNS the following day, August 14, that she had been sexually assaulted by several people who touched her breasts.

On August 15, organizer TryHard Japan announced its intention to file a criminal complaint with the police against the perpetrator on charges of non-consensual obscenity and other offenses. The organizers also released a statement saying that they would "take strict legal action in some cases" concerning slander and hate speech against DJ SODA in relation to the incident.

== Discography ==
=== Extended plays ===
Title	Details	Sales
Closer	Released: June 2, 2016; Label: Warner Music Group; Formats: Digital download, streaming audio; Track listing: 1. Interstellar Love; 2. Kung Fu Dab; 3. BB탄; 4. 22 Cities	

=== Singles ===
Title	Year	Album
"Stay Sweet"	2017	Billboard Presents Electronic Asia Vol. 1
"Never Let You In" (DJ Soda and Walshy Fire)	2018	Non-album single
"Think About It" (DJ Soda and Cuebrick feat. Baer)	2018	Non-album single
"Holding Back" (DJ Soda, Kryoman, and 1st Klase feat. KYE)	2018	Non-album single
"Icy" (DJ Soda and Kaku feat. Young Kay and Pluma)	2019	Non-album single
"If I Die" (DJ Soda and Dolf)	2019	Nighttime
"Empire" (remix) (Wengie, Minnie, and DJ Soda)	2019	Empire Remixes
"Over You" (DJ Soda and Psycho Boys Club)	2020	Non-album single
"Shooting Star"	2020	Non-album single
"Obsession" (DJ Soda and RayRay)	2020	BF200
"Okay!" (DJ Soda, Lost Chameleon, Ahin of Momoland)	2021	Non-album single
"Starlight"	2022	Non-album single
"Cold" (DJ Soda and Spirit Link)	2022	Non-album single
"Tiktok" (DJ Soda and LNY TNZ)	2022	Non-album single
"Alice In Wonderland" (DJ Soda, Blasterjaxx, Hard Lights)	2023	Non-album single
"Memories" (DJ Soda, Highup, Justin J. Moore)	2023	Non-album single

== Awards and nominations ==
Name of the award ceremony, year presented, category, recipient of the award, and the result of the nomination
Award ceremony	Year	Category	Recipient	Result	Ref.
Korea Hallyu Awards	2020	Indie Artist	DJ Soda	Won	
