= Santiago Zannou =

Spanish filmmaker (born 1977)

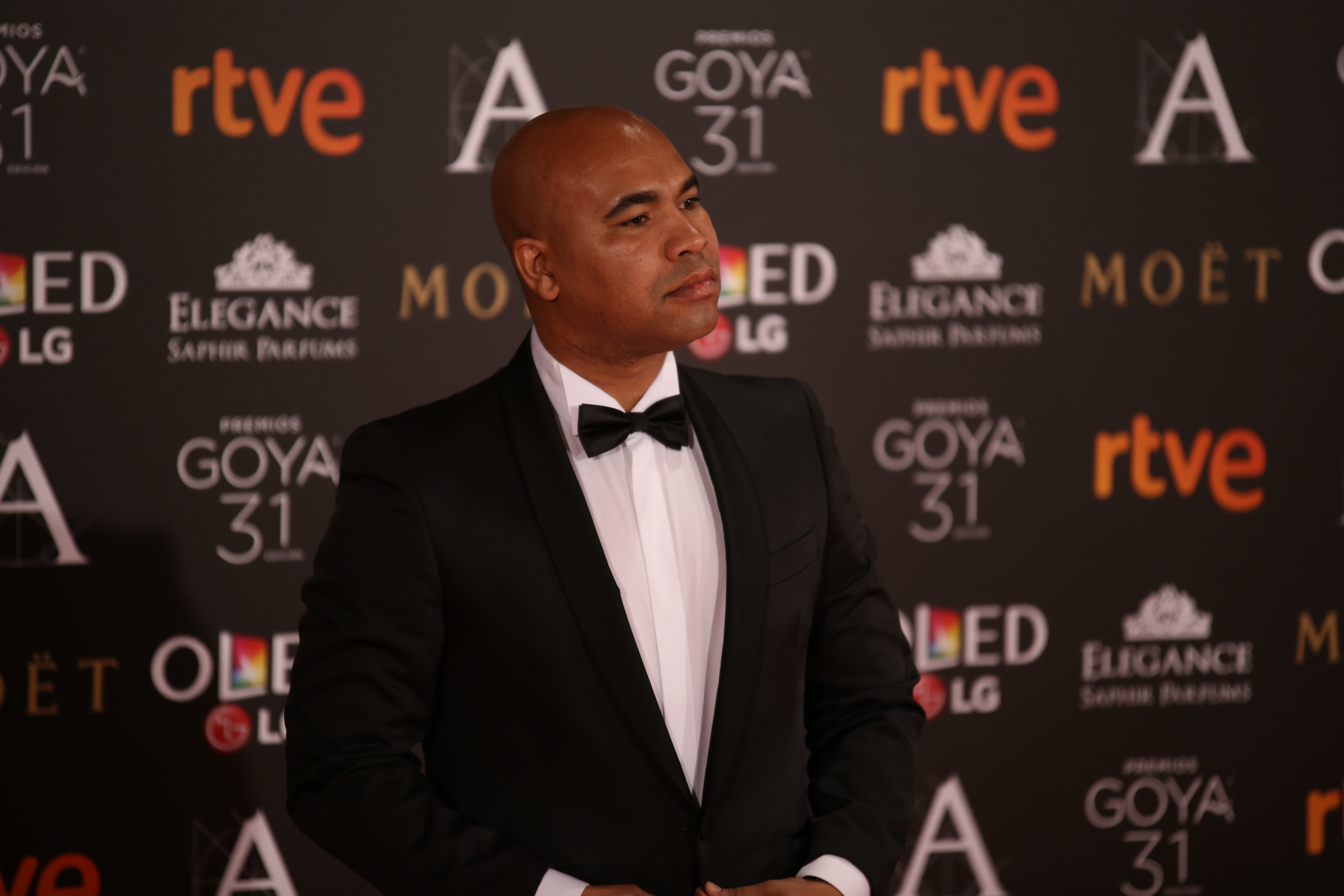
- At the 31st Goya Awards in 2017
- Born: 1977; Madrid, Spain
- Other names: Santiago A. Zannou

Santiago Ahuanojinou Zannou (born 1977) is a Spanish filmmaker.

== Biography ==
Zannou was born in 1977 in Madrid, son to a father from Benin and a mother from Aragon. He was raised in Carabanchel, leaving for Mallorca at age 19. He moved to Barcelona to study filmmaking at the Centre d'Estudis Cinematogràfics de Catalunya (CECC).

Zannou's debut film The One-Handed Trick (2008) earned him the Goya Award for Best New Director (the film also won Best New Actor and Best Original Song). It was followed by two documentary films, namely El alma de La Roja (2009; a documentary about the Spain national football team) and La puerta de no retorno (2011; tracking the return of his father Alphonse Zannou to Benin with his family 40 years after leaving).

His second fiction feature Scorpion in Love (2013), penned alongside Carlos Bardem, earned him a nomination to the Goya Award for Best Adapted Screenplay.

== Filmography ==
Year	Title	Director	Writer	Notes	Ref.
2008	El truco del manco (The One-Handed Trick)	Yes	Yes		
2011	El alma de la Roja	Yes		Documentary	
2011	La puerta de no retorno	Yes		Documentary	
2013	Alacrán enamorado (Scorpion in Love)	Yes	Yes		
2016	Muna	Yes		Documentary	
