= SFDK =

SFDK may refer to:

- Six Flags Discovery Kingdom, an amusement park located in California
- SFDK (band), a Spanish hip-hop group
