= Zona Bruta =

Zona Bruta (Spanish for “Uncouth Zone”) is a Spanish hip hop record label in Madrid founded in 1996. It was one of the first Spanish hip hop specialised labels, and the most important. It operates as a subsidiary of, and is distributed through, Warner Music.

== Discography ==
- 1996: VKR - Más Ke Dificultad
- 1996: CPV - Y Ahora Ke, Eh!
- 1997: El Meswy - Tesis Doctoral
- 1997: VKR - Mentes Revolucionarias
- 1997: CPV - La Saga Continúa
- 1998: VKR - Hasta La Viktoria
- 1998: Frank T- Los Pájaros No Pueden Vivir En El Agua Porque No Son Peces
- 1998: Arianna Puello- El Tentempié
- 1998: CPV - Guannais/A Muerte
- 1998: Mr. Rango- El Hombre De Los 6 Millones De Dólares
- 1998: CPV- Grandes Planes
- 1998: CPV- 29:30 Remix
- 1998: Frank T- La Gran Obra Maestra
- 1999: El Imperio - Monopolio
- 1999: Mala Rodríguez - Toma La Traca/A Jierro
- 1999: Arianna Puello - Gancho Perfecto
- 1999: SFDK - "Siempre Fuerte"
- 1999: Frank T - Frankattack
- 2000: Hablando En Plata - "Operación Mafia Fantástica"
- 2000: Arianna Puello - "Arianna Puello y DJ Tillo"
- 2000: Jotamayúscula - "Hombre Negro Soltero Busca…"
- 2000: Moreno - XXL
- 2000: Moreno - Yakussy
- 2000: Kultama - Al Ritmo De La Noche
- 2000: SFDK - "Desde Los Chiqueros"
- 2001: Hermanos Herméticos - "Interiorismo"
- 2001: VKR - "Kreyentes"
- 2001: Uhno - Creo Que Jamás Volveré A Grabar Si No Se…
- 2001: Arianna Puello - La Flecha
- 2001: VKR - En Las Calles
- 2001: Hablando En Plata - A Sangre Fría
- 2001: Frank T - "90 Kilos"
- 2001: Dnoe - "El Blanco Dnoe"
- 2002: La Excepción - "¡En Tu Carriño Paio!"
- 2002: Mr. Rango - "Baby Tu/Night Fever"
- 2002: Dnoe - "Qué Piensan Las Mujeres 1:Personal"
- 2002: Guateque All Stars - "Guateque All Stars"
- 2002: Guateque All Stars - "Siesta"
- 2003: Arianna Puello - "Así Lo Siento"
- 2003: Hablando En Plata - "Supervillanos De Alquiler"
- 2003: Zenit - "Producto Infinito"
- 2003: La Excepción - " ¡Cata Cheli!"
- 2003: SFDK - "2001: Odisea En El Lodo"
- 2004: Elphomega - "One Man Army"
- 2004: Jotamayúscula - "Una Vida Xtra"
- 2005: Korazón Crudo - "Un Amor, Una Vida Delicada"
- 2005: Zenit - "Es El Momento"
- 2005: Elphomega - "Homoggedon"
- 2005: Aqeel - "Beats & Voices"
- 2005: Aqeel - "Déjame"
- 2005: Ikah - "La MecanIkah"
- 2006: Ikah - "Calma"
- 2006: La Excepción - "Aguantando El Tirón"
- 2006: Korazón Crudo - "El Último Romántico"
- 2006: Zenit - "Torre De Babel"
- 2006: Toscano - "País De Hipocresía"
- 2006: Frank T - "Sonrían Por Favor"
- 2006: Hablando En Plata - "La División De La Victoria"
- 2006: Jotamayúscula - "Camaleón"
- 2007: Sicario - "La Ley De Ohm"
- 2007: Elphomega - "El Testimonio Libra"
- 2007: Toscano - "Yo Underground"
- 2007: Arianna Puello - "Juana Kalamidad"
- 2008: ZPU - "Contradicziones"
- 2008: Arianna Puello - "13 Razones"
- 2008: Guateque All Stars - "Technicolor"
- 2008: Korazón Crudo - "El Club De Los Hombres Invisibles"
- 2008: +Graves - "Sonido Campeón"
- 2008: Guerra - "180°"
