= The One-Handed Trick =

- Spanish: El truco del manco
- Directed by: Santiago A. Zannou
- Screenplay by: Santiago A. Zannou; Iván Morales
- Starring: Juan Manuel Montilla "Langui"; Ovono Candela; Javier Iglesias "Gordo"; Elio Toffana; Mala Rodríguez; Juan Navarro; Diego Carrasco
- Cinematography: Albert Pascual
- Edited by: Jaume Martí
- Music by: Woulfrank Zannou
- Production company: Media Films
- Release dates: September 2008 (Zinemaldia); 16 January 2009 (Spain)
- Country: Spain
- Language: Spanish

The One-Handed Trick (Spanish: El truco del manco) is a 2008 Spanish film directed by Santiago A. Zannou, which stars Juan Manuel Montilla "Langui" alongside Ovono Candela.

== Plot ==
The plot follows the attempts of two friends, Adolfo (hooked on heroin) and El Cuajo (a disabled man), of setting up a hip hop recording studio.

== Cast ==
- Juan Manuel Montilla "Langui" as El Cuajo
- Ovono Candela as Adolfo
- Javier Iglesias "Gordo" as Chacho
- Elio Toffana as Galleta
- Mala Rodríguez as Tsunami
- Juan Navarro as Marquitos
- Diego Carrasco as Jesús

== Production ==
The One-Handed Trick was produced by Media Films, and it had the participation of TVE. Filming took place in locations belonging to the outskirts of Barcelona, including La Mina.

== Release ==
The film screened at the San Sebastián International Film Festival in September 2008. It was theatrically released in Spain on 16 January 2009.

== Reception ==
Mirito Torreiro of Fotogramas rated the film 4 out of 5 stars, highlighting "Zannou's rigor in building the story" as the best thing about the film, while citing a degree of "obviousness in the drawing of some characters" as a negative point.

Jonathan Holland of Variety considered that the film——"a too-rare incursion by Spanish film into the coarse realities of multiculturalism on its cities' outskirts"—features "a crudely makeshift feel that suits its subject".

Irene Crespo of Cinemanía rated it 3 out of 5 stars, considering that Zannou, "with few resources, without professional actors, but with a lot of enthusiasm, and at a rap rhythm", managed to craft "an undeceptive portrait of the reality of any city's slums"

== Accolades ==
| Year | Award | Category | Nominee(s) | Result | Ref. |
|---|---|---|---|---|---|
| 2009 | 23rd Goya Awards | Best New Director | Santiago A. Zannou | Won | |
| 2009 | 23rd Goya Awards | Best New Actor | Juan Manuel Montilla "Langui" | Won | |
| 2009 | 23rd Goya Awards | Best Original Song | Woulfrank Zannou, Juan Manuel Montilla "Langui" | Won | |

== See also ==
- List of Spanish films of 2009
