= Arianna Puello =

Dominican rapper (born 1977)

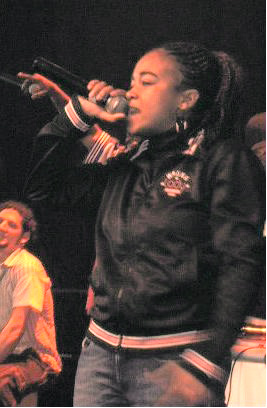
- Puello performing in Madrid
- Born: Arianna Isabel Puello Pereyra; 16 January 1977 (age 49); San Pedro de Macorís, Dominican Republic
- Other names: Ari
- Occupation: Rapper

Arianna Isabel Puello Pereyra (born 16 January 1977) is a Dominican rapper. Her single "Juana Kalamidad" reached number six on the Spanish Singles Chart.

Puello lived in the Dominican Republic before moving to Salt, Girona (Girona, Catalonia, Spain) when she was 8 years old. She started out in the world of hip hop in 1993 when she recorded a song with a friend, and later joined a band with Bano known as N.O.Del KRIB (Nacidos Originalmente del Karibe). After they split up, she joined another band, Discípulos del Micro, but she had her first hit with a collaboration on El Meswy's first album, Mujer chunga. In 1998, she released her first solo album, El tentempié.

== Discography ==
- 1998: El tentempié (Zona Bruta)
- 1999: Gancho perfecto (Zona Bruta)
- 2001: La fecha (Zona Bruta)
- 2003: Así lo siento (Zona Bruta)
- 2008: 13 Razones (Zona Bruta)
- 2010: Kombate o Muere (Zona Bruta)
- 2015: Despierta (EnTuCuelloRecords, Zona Bruta)
- 2017: Rap Komunion (EnTuCuelloRecords, Zona Bruta)
- TBA: Gloria y Eternidad (TBD)

== Collaborations ==
- 1997: El Meswy Tesis Doctoral
- 1999: El Imperio Monopolio
- 1999: Frank T Nuevo ser
- 2001: VKR En las calles
- 2001: Hablando en Plata A sangre fría
- 2001: Frank T 90 kilos
- 2003: Zenit Producto infinito
- 2004: Cartel de Santa La Plaga Del Rap
- 2005: Full Nelson Confía en mí
- 2005: BO de Bagdad Rap
- 2006: Tiempo de kambio
- 2014: C-Kan "Justicia"
