= El Langui =

Spanish actor (born 1979)

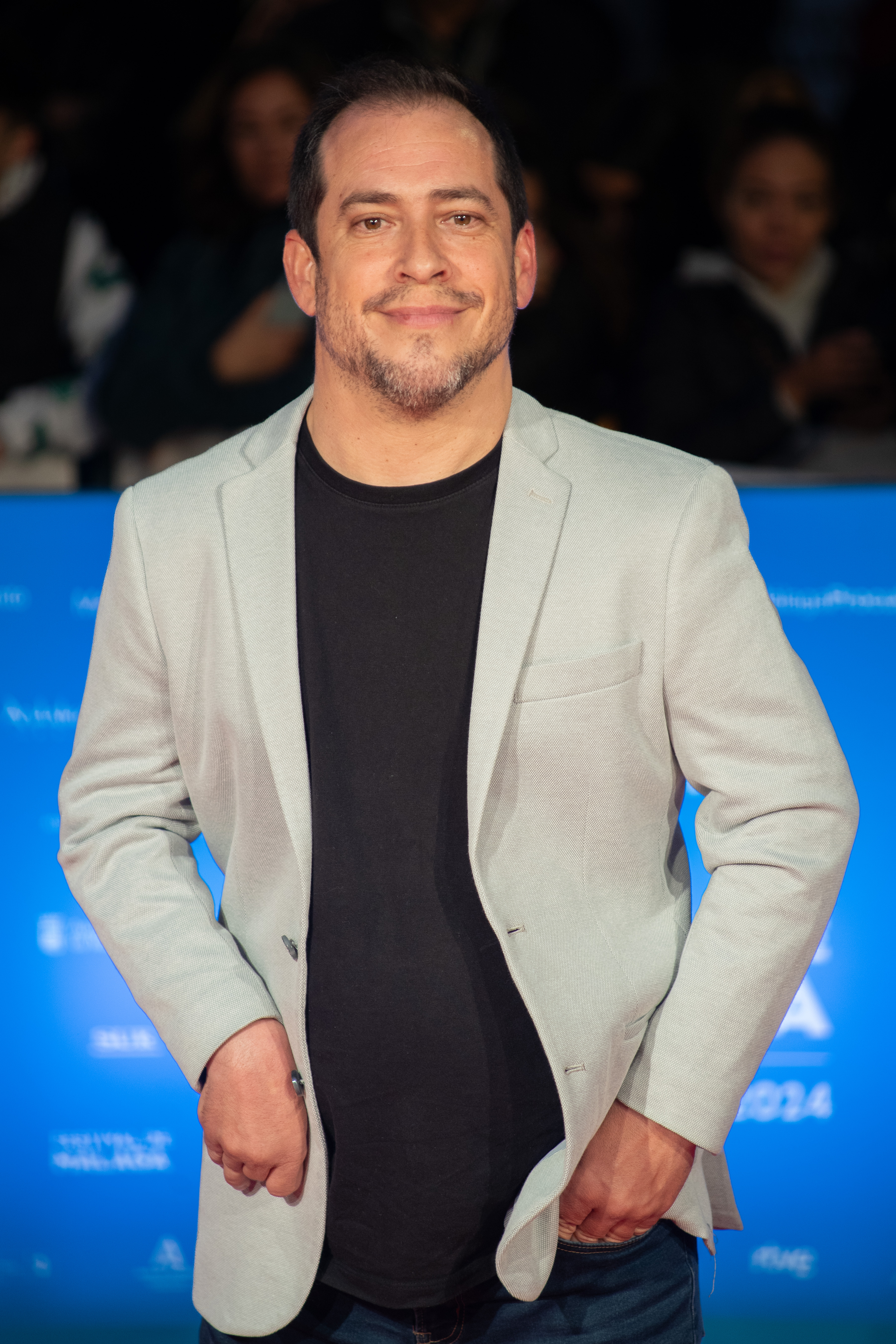
- El Langui in 2024
- Born: Juan Manuel Montilla Macarrón; 1 November 1979 (age 46); Madrid, Spain
- Occupations: Actor; rapper; boccia player

Juan Manuel Montilla Macarrón (born 1 November 1979), better known as El Langui, is a Spanish rapper, actor and boccia player. He was a member of musical trio La Excepción.

== Life and career ==
Juan Manuel Montilla Macarrón was born in Madrid on 1 November 1979 and was raised in Pan Bendito, a southern area of Madrid. Due to lack of oxygen during childbirth, he has cerebral palsy, which caused him a motor disorder of spasticity.

Together with Gitano Antón and Ladako Style, El Langui founded the hip-hop trio La Excepción. La Excepción won Best Spanish Act at the 2006 MTV Europe Music Awards.

He made his feature film acting debut in The One-Handed Trick (2008) portraying Cuajo, a young man with palsy who fights for his dream of setting up a film studio. He won a Goya Award for Best New Actor and a Goya Award for Best Original Song for his work in the film. He has since featured in films such as Que baje Dios y lo vea, La cripta, el último secreto, or La familia Benetón and series such as Cuerpo de élite and 30 Coins.

His solo musical career beyond La Excepción includes the release of two albums: Hola (2015) and Espasticidad (2022).
