= Aqeel Ahmed (director) =

British film writer and director (born 1987)

- Born: Aqeel Ahmed; 14 July 1987 (age 39); London, England
- Other name: M Aqeel Ahmed
- Occupations: Film Director, Screenwriter & Film Producer
- Awards: UH Animation Expose for "Best Comedic Film"; 2008 Alienated; Virgin Media Shorts "Finalist"; 2008 Alienated
- Website: www.aqeel.co

Aqeel Ahmed (born 14 July 1987), also known by his birthname Mohammed Aqeel Ahmed or M Aqeel Ahmed, is a British film writer and director, as well as founder of his own creative, film & video production company, Ahmco. He is known for his comic short films and animations, usually highlighting social problems and situations. His student short film, Alienated (2008), a visual-effects film about an alien trying to be accepted on Earth, was shortlisted for the Virgin Media Shorts Festival 2008, and is up for awards.

== Filmography ==
- How to be a Superhero (2007), Director
- Alienated (2008), Director
- Shattered Pieces (2009), Director

== Shattered Pieces ==
In 2009, Ahmed completed a 15-minute short film entitled Shattered Pieces, about a man waking up to find London destroyed. It was shown in film festivals domestically as well as internationally. In 2010, he uploaded a remastered version of the film (with new colour grading and visual effects) to the popular video sharing site, YouTube.

== Ahmco and upcoming projects ==
In September 2011, Ahmed announced on Twitter that he was planning to set up a new production company called Ahmco. Later, a Twitter account and Facebook page emerged, revealing that the company will offer creative services with, the not surprising, speciality in film and video. Ahmco will also serve as a film production company, producing Ahmed's future film projects. The first announced "in-house" production is currently titled AndiRoid.
