= The Zombie Kids =

Spanish music group

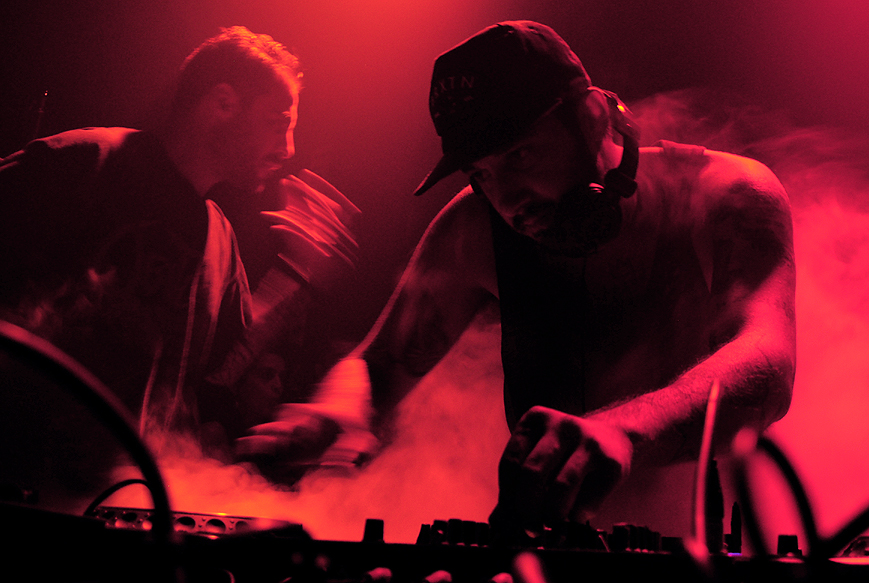
- The Zombie Kids

Background information
- Origin: Spain; Turkey
- Genres: House, progressive house, electro house
- Years active: 2008–present
- Labels: UMG
- Members: Edgar Candel Kerri; Cumhur Jay Yilmaz
- Website: thezombiekids.es

The Zombie Kids is a band formed by Edgar Candel Kerri and Cumhur Jay, two disc jockeys and record producers who live in Spain. The newly formed band became popular with their debut in 2010 edition of the Rock in Rio Lisbon festival and the release of their first single "Face" (2010), which was a great success. The song was chosen to be part of the O.S.T of the movie Tengo ganas de ti and the Mexican brewery advertisement of "Cerveza Indio". Its good acceptance made the record label Universal Music sign an agreement with the band to record its first album, The Zombie Kids, which went on sale 27 July 2012. That same year, the band was awarded with the MTV Europe Music Award for Best Spanish Act. During the summer of 2013, The Zombie Kids was the musical band which had performed the most in public. They have also launched their first project "TZK Radio" with monthly sessions with which they have made public their song "My House is Your House" feat. MC Ambush.

== Discography ==
=== Album ===
- 2012: The Zombie Kids

=== Singles ===
- "Face" (feat. Aqeel)
- "Zumbiezed"
- "Mamajuana Rock" (feat. GP BOYZ)
- "Kiss mys Ass" (vs IKKI)
- "Blow Money Fast"
- "Drums of Death"
- "Fire" (feat.Aqeel)
- "My House Is Your House" (feat. Mc Ambush)

== Featurings ==
- "Face", "Live Forever", "Live Forever part II", "Fire", "Vampire", "Hype" (feat. Aqeel)
- "Mamajuana Rock My Click" (feat. GP BOYZ)
- "Insane" (feat.Rebecca Lander)
- "Zombegz" (feat. Foreign Beggars)
- "Early Moan" (feat. Raytack)
- "Tonight" (feat. McAmbush)
- "Spanish Sauce Mafia" (feat. The Party Harders)
- "Ocean" (feat.Bella Darling)
