= Green Valley (band) =

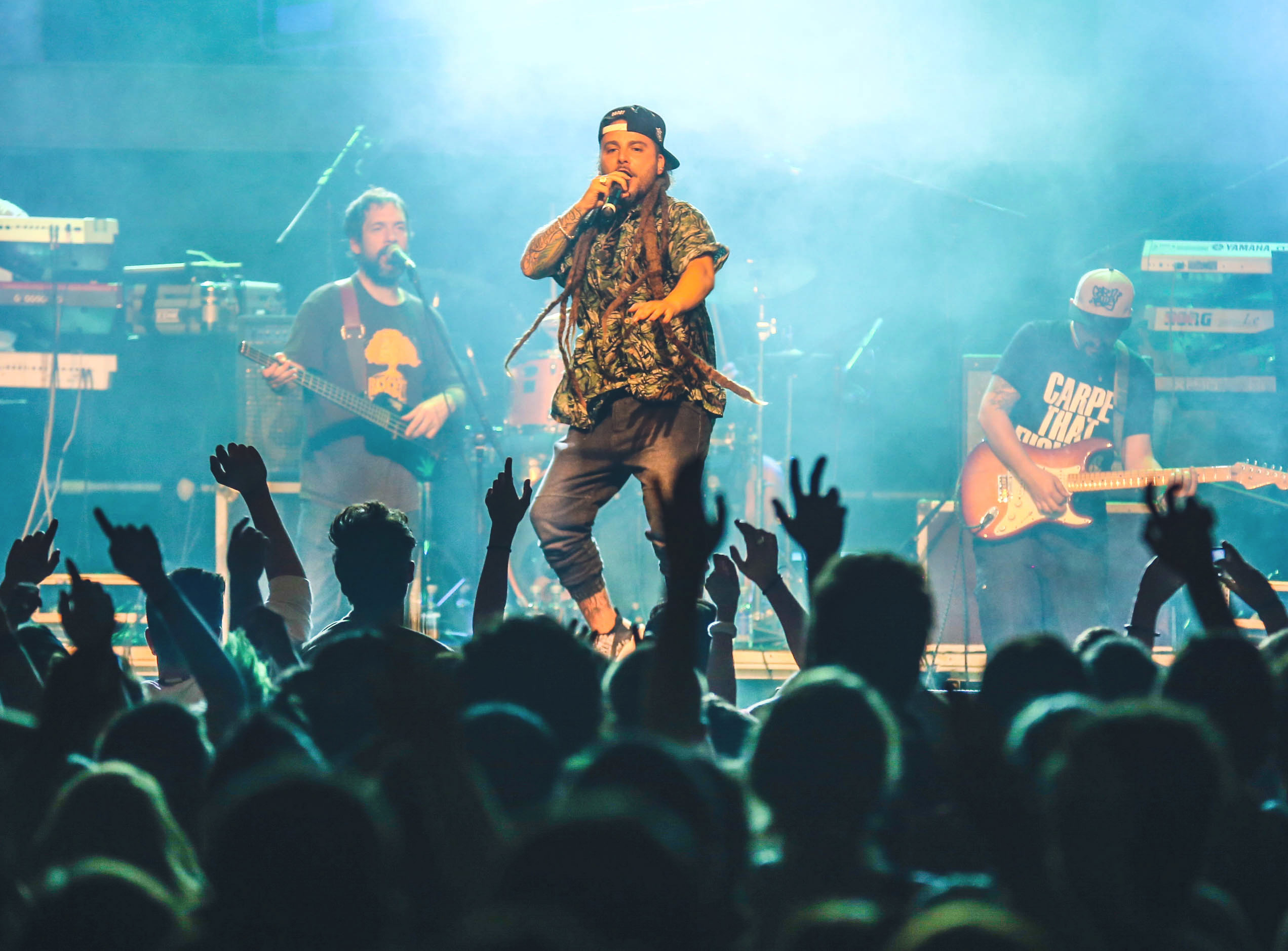

Background information
- Origin: Barcelona, Alava y RicoteSpain
- Genres: Reggae, dancehall
- Years active: 2004–present
- Labels: Mad 91, Producciones vikingas
- Members: Ander Valverde; Egoitz Uriarte; Ander Larrea (musico); Juantxi Fernández; Jonathan Sánchez
- Website: pagina oficial

Green Valley is a Spanish reggae-dancehall group formed by five musicians, native to Alava and Catalonia. Their songs address social injustice.

== History ==
In 2001, Ander Valverde, founder of Green Valley, (whose surname translated in English gives name to the band), began performing in Sound System format in Vitoria. One Year later he recorded his first demo solo El sueño perdido and, soon after, in September 2004, the idea of forming a band emerged. Seeing it was accepted by the public they decided to move to Barcelona in 2006.

In 2007, their second demo called Inmigrantes was recorded and they began playing concerts around Spain. In 2010, the band launched their first album “En tus manos”, an album full of reggae, roots and dancehall. The title refers to the call to transform the world in which we live through social awareness with witty lyrics, catchy phrases and an unmistakable voice.

In 2012, they released their second album called La Voz del Pueblo, an album with a critique of the society in which we live. In 2013, the band released their album Mírame a Los Ojos, consisting of acoustic songs. That year was special for Green Valley who made their début in festivals like Reggaeboa Balboa, Lagata or Rotottom Sunsplash 20th. 2014 was their 10th anniversary as a band and they marked the achievement with a special album called Hijos de la Tierra, their fourth album and one which confirmed their notable evolution as a referential group in the national scene. The album was presented for the first time in the Festimad which was celebrated in February 2015.

== Members ==
- Ander Valverde – vocals and songwriter
- Egoitz Uriarte – drums
- Ander Larrea – guitars
- Juantxi Fernández – bass guitar
- Jonathan Sánchez – keyboards

== Discography ==
=== Albums ===
- 2010: En tus manos
- 2012: La voz del pueblo
- 2013: Mirame a los ojos
- 2014: Hijos de la tierra
- 2019: Bajo la piel

=== Demos ===
- 2002: El sueño perdido (Ander Valverde in solitary)
- 2007: Inmigrantes

=== Samples ===
- 2013: "Gente real" featuring Tosko
- 2013: "Friend" featuring Shinjiman
- 2013: "Lo mio lo comparto" featuring Kinki Bwoy
