= La puerta de no retorno =

- Film poster
- Directed by: Santiago A. Zannou
- Screenplay by: Santiago A. Zannou; Jaume Martí
- Produced by: Shankara Films Dokia Films
- Cinematography: Albert Pascual
- Edited by: Jaume Martí
- Music by: Wolfrank Zannou
- Release date: 2010
- Running time: 72'
- Country: Spain

La puerta de no retorno is a 2010 film.

== Synopsis ==
Santiago A. Zannou accompanies his father, Alphonse, to his homeland, Benin, 40 years after he left it, to face his fears and his lies. On this journey of redemption, Alphonse will not just seek reconciliation with his only living sister, but also forgiveness from his ancestors, in the hopes of finally laying the hurt of the past to rest.
