= Aqeel =

عقيل
- Pronunciation: Arabic: [ʕaqiːl]
- Gender: Male

Origin
- Origin: Arabic
- Meaning: "knowledgeable", "wise"

Other names
- Alternative spelling: Aqil, Akil, Akeel, 'Aaqil, Aqiil, Aaqil
- Anglicisation: Aqeel

Aqeel (Arabic: عَقِيْل) is an Arabic male given name, which means "knowledgeable", "intelligent", or "wise". An alternative spelling is Aqil. The name may refer to:

== Historical ==
- Aqil ibn Abi Talib (c. 580 – 670 or 683), cousin and companion of Muhammad; brother of Ali

== Modern ==
- Aqeel Abbas Jafari (born 1957), Pakistani writer
- Aqeel Ahmed (director) (born 1987), British filmmaker
- Aqeel Ahmed (cricketer) (born 1982), Pakistani cricketer
- Aqeel Karim Dhedhi (born 1957), Pakistani businessman
- Aqeel Khan (born 1980), Pakistani tennis player
- Aqeel Rehman (born 1985), Austrian squash player
- Aqiil Gopee (born 1997), Mauritian writer and poet
- DJ Aqeel (born 1977), Indian DJ, singer and composer
- Mohammed Aqeel (died 2014), Pakistani militant
