= Kryoman =

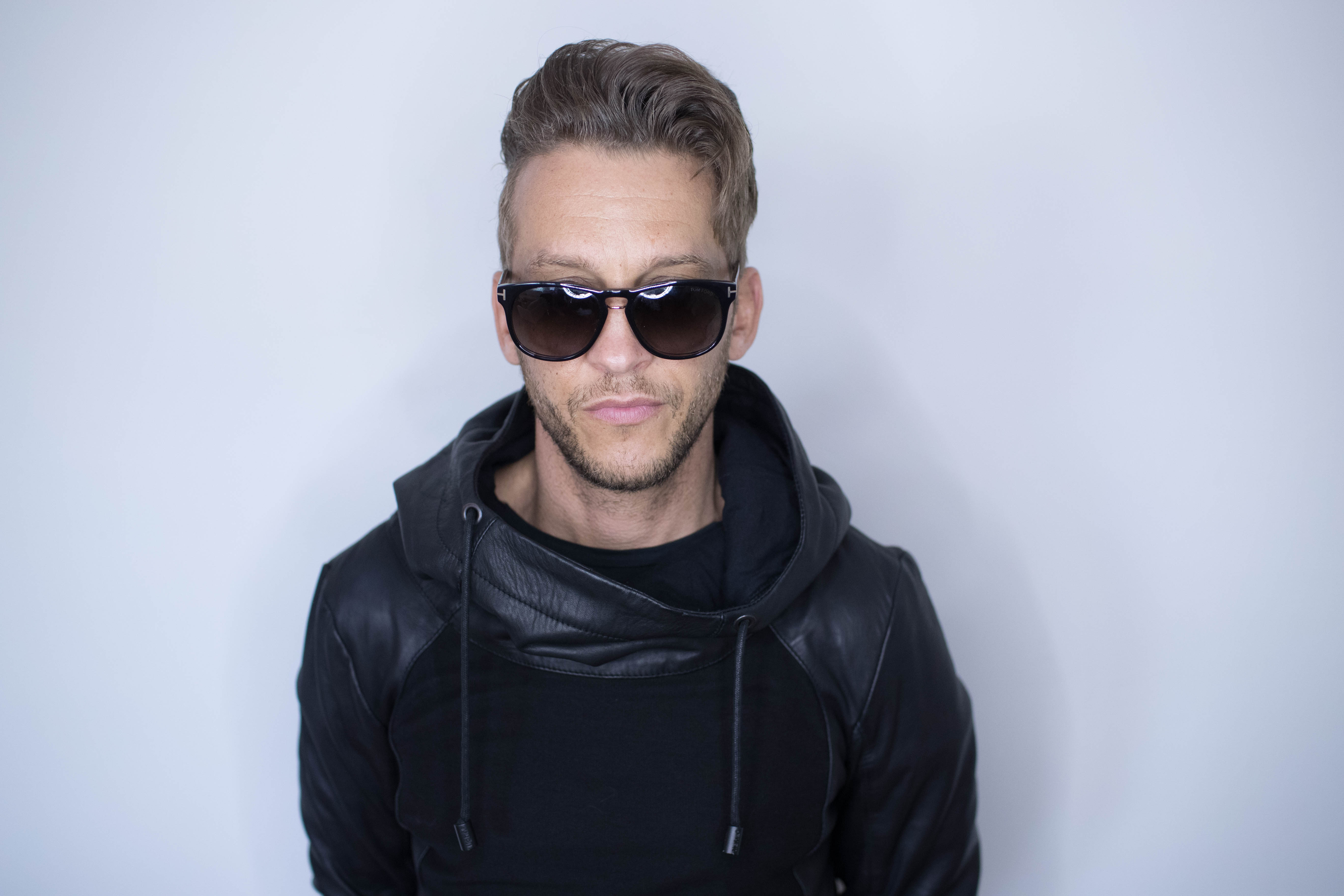

Background information
- Birth name: Andrew Moore
- Born: December 10, 1982 (age 42); London, England
- Origin: England
- Genres: Electro house, Trap, Future house
- Occupation(s): Producer, DJ
- Years active: 1998–present
- Labels: Darklight Recordings, Uprise Music, Nervous records
- Website: www.kryoman.com

Andrew Moore (born December 10, 1982; known by his stage name KRYOMAN), is a Miami-based electronic dance music DJ from London, England. He is best known for the development and use of ten-foot-tall (3.0 m) robot suits equipped with high powered lights, smoke guns, Hi-Definition LED mapping, and pyrotechnic special FX systems. Kryoman appears worldwide, touring and performing with other EDM artists such as Steve Aoki, Fedde le Grand, DJ Tiësto, Afrojack, The Black Eyed Peas, and Nicki Minaj. Kryoman operates out of Los Angeles, New York City, Miami, and Ibiza, and has several other Kryoman groups stationed worldwide. In March 2016, Kryoman released a record entitled "my squads lit" with Shaquille O'Neal. Kryoman has musical release on Darklight Recordings, Uprise Music, and Nervous Records.

== Biography ==
Kryoman grew up in Ibiza and performed there for over a decade. His music techniques include trap, EDM, and future house. He was a dancer at the main stage at Ultra Music Festival Miami, and toured with David Guetta, Steve Aoki, the Black Eyed Peas, and Akon.

Kryoman has had multiple solo releases and collaborations with Laidback Luke, Deb's Daughter, Shaquille O'Neal, Akon and more, releasing via Warner Bros. Records, Darklight Records, Armada Music, Nervous Records, Zion, and Uprise Music. He gathered support from Dimitri Vegas & Like Mike, Tiësto, Fatboy Slim, Fedde Le Grand.

== Robots ==
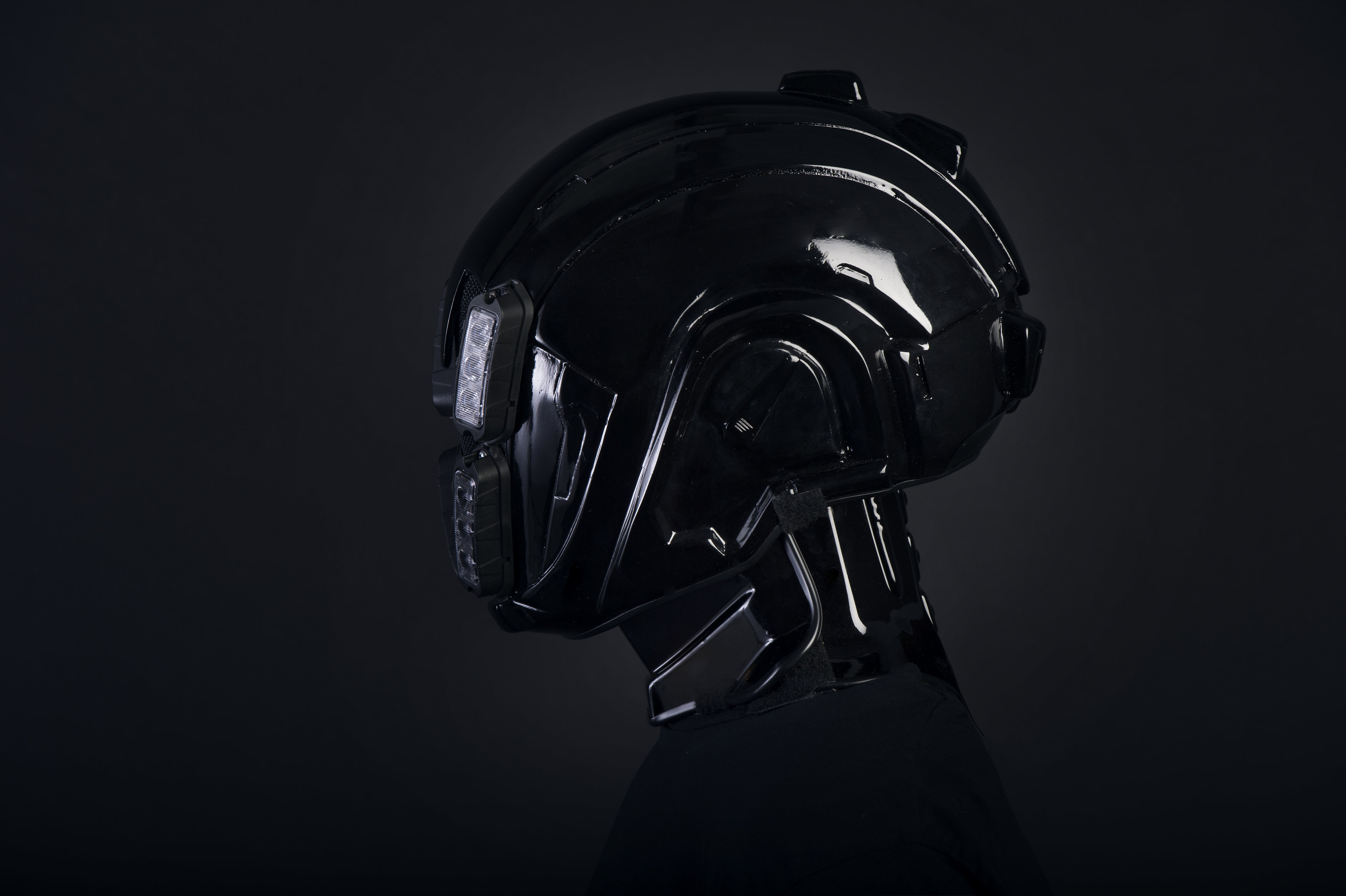

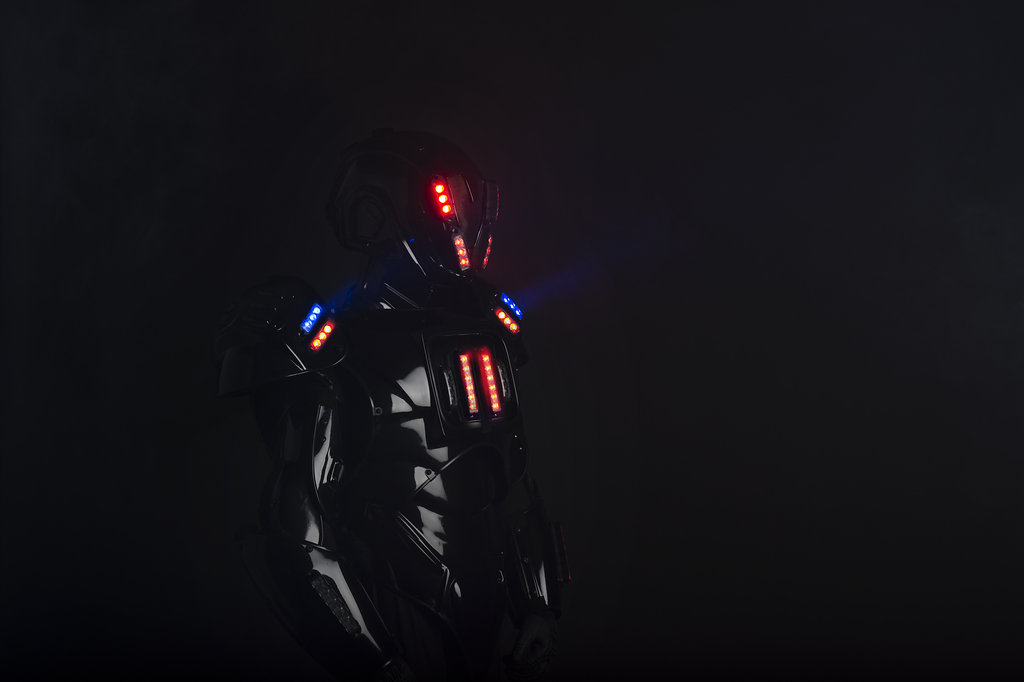

The idea of the Kryoman robot was developed in 2005. The artistic concept utilizes ten-foot-tall (3 m) robot suits equipped with high powered lights, smoke guns, high-definition LED mapping, and pyrotechnic special FX systems. Later Kryoman collaborated with Cathy and David Guetta and completed over a thousand shows in 52 countries on three world tours. During that, he teamed up with the Black Eyed Peas, Nicki Minaj, Akon, Ludacris, Pitbull, Kelly Roland, and Usher to perform several music videos and tour performances.

In 2015 Kryoman teamed up with Steve Aoki to complete two American tours and designed the key elements for his neon-inspired production. Now Kryoman's robot project is focused on a solo production called Kryoman Live.

== Appearances ==
He appeared in a 2018 episode of To Tell the Truth.
