= SFDK (band) =

Spanish hip-hop crew

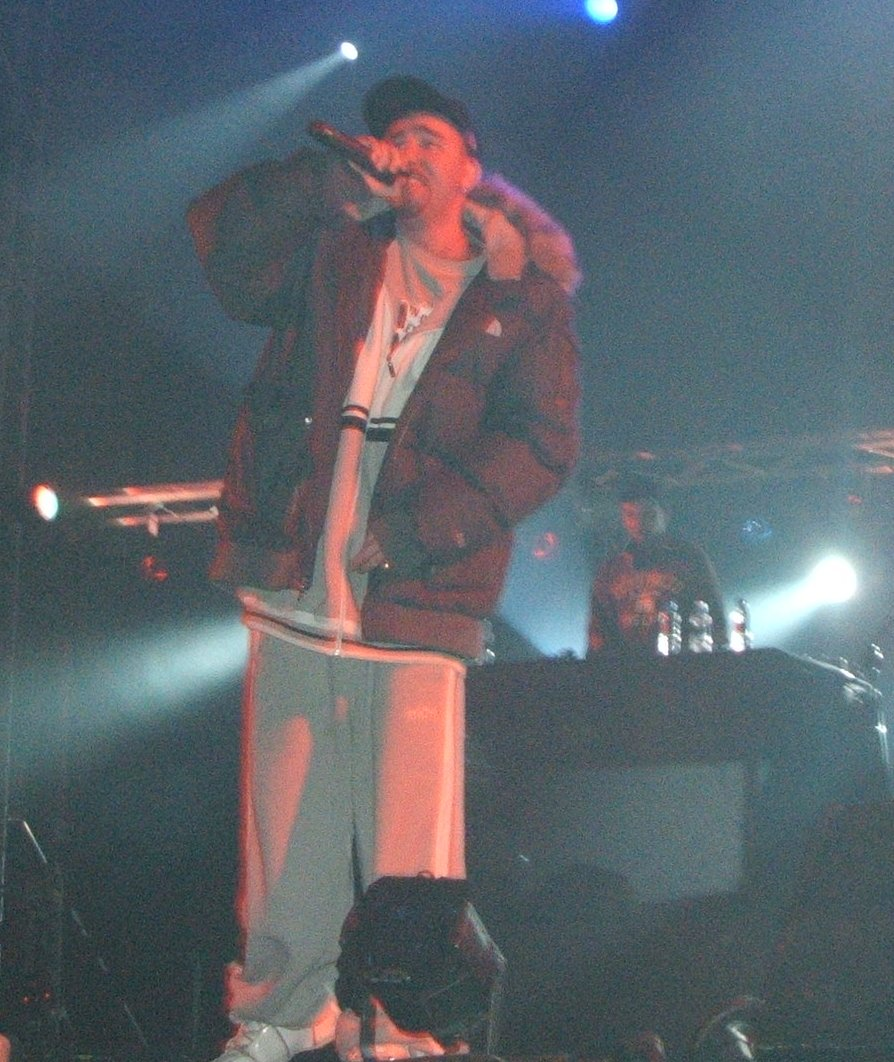
- SFDK in a show in 2006.

Background information
- Origin: Seville, Spain
- Genres: Hip-hop
- Years active: 1992–present
- Labels: Zeroporsiento; Zona Bruta; SFDK; BOA
- Members: Zatu; Acción Sánchez
- Past members: Moro

SFDK (Siempre Fuertes De Konciencia) are a hip-hop crew from Seville, Spain.

== Biography ==
SFDK was formed in 1992 by Zatu together with school friends. The group released a demo tape, before Acción Sánchez joined. As SFDK became more widely know in the region, they released two more tapes before, in 1997, founding their own record label, Zeroporsiento. Using their own label, then released the single, "Llámalo como lo quieras" (Call it what you want). The group then fell apart, leaving only Acción Sánchez and Zatu.

Two years later, SFDK released their first album, "Siempre Fuertes" (Always Strong), critically received as a very aggressive hardcore hip-hop album. Then they released the albums "Desde los chiqueros" (From The Pigpens) and "2001: Odisea en el lodo" (2001: Odyssey in Mud), changing their style towards a more accessible kind of hip-hop, and gaining popularity and commercial success.

They created their label, SFDK Records. In 2005, they earned a Gold Album for their album "2005".

== Call it what you want ==
In 1997 created his first master label in Rap music in Sevilla, Zeroporsiento. The first music record released under this label was the SFDK first single in professional format: "Call it what you want" in 1997.

== Discography ==
Albums

- Siempre fuertes (Zona Bruta, 1999)
- Desde los chiqueros (Zona Bruta, 2001)
- 2001 Odisea en el lodo (Zona Bruta, 2003)
- 2005 (SFDK Records/Boa Music, 2005)
- Los veteranos (SFDK Records/ Boa Music, 2007)
- Siempre fuertes 2 (SFDK Records, 2009)
- Tesoros y caras B (SFDK Records, 2010)
- Lista de invitados [Doble Disc](SFDK Records, 2011)
- Sin miedo a vivir (SFDK Records, 2014)
- Redención (Boa Music / SFDK Records, 2018)
- Inkebrantable (Altafonte / SFDK Records, 2023)

Singles

- "Llámalo como lo quieras" (Zeroporsiento, 1997)
- "Después de..." (SFDK Records, 2004)
- "Original Rap University" (SFDK Records, 2006)
- "Un probre con dinero" (Boa Music / SFDK Records, 2019)
- "Fase 2" (Altafonte / SFDK Records, 2020)

EPs and others

- "Outta Kranny" (1993)
- "Tras mil vueltas" (1995)
- "Esto va en serio" (1996)
- "Llámalo como lo quieras" (Zeroporsiento, 1997)
- "Después de..." (SFDK Records, 2004)
- "Original Rap University" (SFDK Records, 2006)

=== DVDs ===
- Black Book (Boa Records, 2008)

== See also ==
- Spanish hip hop
