= Rao =

Rao or RAO may refer to:

== Arts and entertainment ==
- Rao (comics), a star of Krypton in various comics
- Rao, a Greyhawk deity in Dungeons & Dragons: World of Greyhawk
- Raō, the Japanese name for Raoh, in Fist of the North Star
- Ramji Rao, in Indian films including Ramji Rao Speaking, 1989

== People ==
- Rao (Indian surname), including a list of people with the name
- Rao (Chinese surname), including a list of people with the name
- Rao (Italian surname)

== Places ==
- Rao, West Sumatra, Indonesia
- Råö, Kungsbacka Municipality, Halland County, Sweden
- Rao, Senegal
  - Rao Arrondissement
- Rao Prefecture, in imperial China

== Science and technology ==
- Rao (wasp), a genus of insects in the family Platygastridae
- Recent African origin of modern humans (RAO), a paleoanthropological theory
- Recurrent airway obstruction (RAO), a respiratory disease in horses
- Response amplitude operator (RAO), an engineering statistic in ship design
- Ribose aminooxazoline (RAO), an intermediate organic compound in origin of life chemistry

== Other uses ==
- Rao (title), or Rai
- Rao language, in Papua New Guinea
- Rawa people, an ethnic group in Southeast Asia
- Rao's, an Italian restaurant in New York City, U.S.
- Leite Lopes Airport, Brazil, IATA code RAO

== See also ==
- Rai (disambiguation)
- Ray (disambiguation)
- Rau (disambiguation)
- Cramér–Rao bound, a statistical concept
- Rao–Blackwell theorem, a theorem in statistics
