= Rao, Senegal =

Town in Saint-Louis Region, Senegal

Rao
- Town
- Location within Senegal
- Coordinates: 15°55′N 16°23′W
- Country: Senegal
- Region: Saint-Louis Region
- Department: Saint-Louis Department
- Arrondissement: Rao Arrondissement
- Elevation: 9 m (30 ft)

Population (2003)
  - Total: 1,146
- Time zone: UTC+0 (GMT)

Rao is a village in northern Senegal, approximately 15km from Saint-Louis. It is the seat of the eponymous Rao Arrondissement.

Rao is known primarily as an important archaeological site, where the 'Rao Pectoral' was discovered in a burial mound in 1941. The large, golden disc is among the most impressive artifacts unearthed in Senegal. It dates from the period of the founding of the Jolof Empire, and was found near the ancient village of Mboyu-Gar where the empire's founder Ndiadiane Ndiaye first appeared in Waalo.
