= Rau (surname) =

Rau is a surname with several origins.

An early form was a nickname for a hairy person, from the Middle High German rūch, rūhe, rouch, meaning hairy, shaggy, or rough. As a surname, it was first found among notable families in Saxony in the 13th century.

In medieval England, it was a variant of the given name Ralph. This derived from the Old Norse personal name "Radulfr", composed of the Germanic elements rad (meaning counsel or advice), and wolf (wolf). The name became popular after the Norman Conquest of 1066, when the Normans introduced the Old French form, "Raoul", as well as the Norman "Radulf" and "Raulf". The variant form "Rau" was reintroduced into England by French Huguenot refugees in the late 16th century.

In Sicily, Italy, it was a variant of the given name Rao. In France, it was a variant form of the surname Rheault, of French or Breton origin.

== People ==
People with the surname include:

- Alan S. Rau, American lawyer
- Albert Rau (born 1960), Kazakh politician
- Alexe Rău (1953–2015), Moldovan philologist and library scientist
- Andrea Rau (born 1947), German actress and producer
- Anita Rau Badami (born 1961), Indian-Canadian writer
- Aurel Rău (born 1930), Romanian poet, novelist, and translator
- B. N. Rau (1887–1953), Indian civil servant, co-drafter of the constitutions of India and Burma
- Benegal Rama Rau (1889–1969), Indian diplomat and career civil servant
- Bob Rau (1951–2002), Indian computer engineer
- Brad Rau, American animator and director known for his contributions to Happy Tree Friends and Star Wars: The Bad Batch
- Charles Rau (1826–1887), Belgian-American archaeologist
- Christian Rau (known by the latinisation "Ravis"), 17th century German orientalist
- Christina Rau (born 1956), spouse of the President of Germany (1999–2004)
- Cornelia Rau (born c. 1965), unlawfully detained immigrant to Australia
- Dhanvanthi Rama Rau (1893–1987), Indian women's rights advocate
- Dominic Rau (born 1990), German footballer
- Doug Rau (born 1948), American baseball player
- Ernst Rau (1927–2012), German fencer and Olympian
- Fritz Rau (1930–2013), German music promoter
- Gabriël Rau (born 1998), Belgian-Brazilian streamer and professional League of Legends player known as "Bwipo"
- Gretchen Rau (1939–2006), American film set decorator
- Guilherme Rau (died 1953), German-Brazilian ophthalmologist
- Hans Rau, Swiss footballer
- Heinrich Rau (1899–1961), East German statesman
- Ines Rau (born 1990), French model, first openly transgender Playmate of the Month
- Jana Rau-Sorgers (born 1967), German rower
- Joe Rau (born 1991), American wrestler
- John Rau (born 1959), Australian barrister and politician
- Johannes Rau (1931–2006), President of Germany, 1999–2004
- Johannes Jacobus Rau (1668–1719), Dutch surgeon and anatomist
- Junior Rau, Papua New Guinean rugby league footballer
- K. Ananda Rau (1893–1966), Indian mathematician
- Karl Heinrich Rau (1792–1870), German political economist
- Kereopa Te Rau (died 1872), leader of the Māori Pai Mārire movement
- Kyle Rau (born 1992), American ice hockey forward
- Louis Rau (1841–1923), Franco-Bavarian industrialist
- Marcel Rau (1886–1966), Belgian sculptor and coin engraver
- M. Chalapathi Rau (c. 1908–1983), Indian journalist, author, and newspaper editor
- Milo Rau (born 1977), Swiss theatre director and playwright
- Michelle Rau, American cartoonist known for Lana's World
- Norm Rau, American musician and former member of Dessau
- Okka Rau (born 1977), German beach volleyball player
- Oliver Rau (born 1968), German lightweight rower
- P. Raghavendra Rau (1889–1942), Indian civil servant
- Patrick Rau (born 1976), German video game designer
- Phạm Khắc Rậu (1921–2002), Vietnamese lawyer and diplomat
- Phillipp-Anders Rau (born 1983), German politician
- Purnima Rau (born 1967), Indian cricketer and cricket coach
- Raghavendra Rau, Indian academic
- Reinhold Rau (1932–2006), South African natural historian and founder of the Quagga Project
- Richard Rau (1889–1945), German SS officer, track and field athlete, and Olympian
- Santha Rama Rau (1923–2009), Indian-American writer
- Thomas Rau (born 1984), German Paralympic table tennis player
- Tobias Rau (born 1981), German footballer
- Tomás Rau (born 1973), Chilean economist and academic
- Virgínia Rau (1907–1973), Portuguese archaeologist and historian
- William H. Rau (1855–1920), American photographer
- Uwe Rau, German physicist
- Zbigniew Rau (born 1955), Polish politician, lawyer, diplomat and Minister of Foreign Affairs

== Fictional characters ==
- Fenn Rau from the American animated science fiction television series Star Wars Rebels (2014–2018)

== Disambiguation pages ==
- Gustav Rau (disambiguation)
