= Rau (disambiguation) =

Rau is a town in India.

Rau or RAU may also refer to:

== People ==
- Rau (surname), includes a list of people with the surname

== Places ==
- RAU, the IOC code for the now defunct United Arab Republic (République arabe unie)
- Rau (Tanzanian ward), Kilimanjaro Region, Tanzania
- Rau (Vidhan Sabha constituency), Madhya Pradesh, India

== Universities ==
- Rand Afrikaans University, a defunct university in Johannesburg, South Africa
- Royal Agricultural University, in Cirencester, England

== Other uses ==
- Railway Union, a trade union in Finland
- Rau (novel), a 1972 novel by N. S. Inamdar
- Rau Le Creuset, a character from the anime Mobile Suit Gundam SEED
- Rawa people, an ethnic group in Southeast Asia
- Recurrent aphthous ulcer, a kind of mouth ulcer

== See also ==
- Rao (disambiguation)
- Raw (disambiguation)
