= Rawe =

Rawe may refer to:

- Rawe (Rajput clan), a Subgroup of Rajput clans of India
- Rawe Peak, in Nevada, US
- Donald Rawe (born 1930), British author and publisher
- Jackie Rawe, Shakatak band member
- Stuart Rawe, actor

== See also ==
- O'Rawe, a surname
- Raw (disambiguation)
- Raue
