= Raw =

Raw is an adjective usually describing:

- Raw materials, basic materials from which products are manufactured or made
- Raw food, uncooked food

Raw or RAW may also refer to:

== Computing and electronics ==
- .RAW, a proprietary mass spectrometry data format
- Raw audio format, a file type used to represent sound in uncompressed form
- Raw image format, a variety of image files used by digital cameras, containing unprocessed data
- Rawdisk, binary level disk access
- Read after write, technologies used for CD-R and CD-RW
- Read after write (RAW) hazard, a data dependency hazard considered in microprocessor architecture
- Raw display, a raw framed monitor.

== Film and television ==
- Raw TV, a British TV production company
- Raw (film), a 2016 film
- Raw (TV series), an Irish drama series
- Eddie Murphy Raw, a 1987 live stand-up comedy recording
- Ramones: Raw, a 2004 music documentary
- Raw FM, an Australian television series
- WWE Raw, a weekly World Wrestling Entertainment program

== Games ==
- Rules as written, or RAW, the literal rules of a game, similar to the letter of the law
- WWF Raw (1994 video game), professional wrestling video game
- WWF Raw (2002 video game), professional wrestling video game
- WWE Raw 2, Xbox professional wrestling video game
- WWE video games, category listing all games based on WWE RAW franchise and more

== Magazines ==
- Raw (comics magazine), comics magazine launched in 1980
- Raw (music magazine), British magazine published by EMAP in the 1980s and 1990s
- Raw Magazine, published by World Wrestling Entertainment, see WWE Magazine

== Music ==
=== Albums ===
- R.A.W. (album), a 2000 album by Daz Dillinger
- RAW (City Girls album), 2023
- Raw (Alyson Williams album), 1989
- Raw (Crack the Sky album), 1986
- Raw (Hopsin album), 2010
- Raw (Jimmy Barnes album), 2001
- Raw (Juvenile album), 2005
- Raw (Keith LeBlanc album), 1990
- Raw (Moxy album), 2002
- Raw (Ra album), 2006
- Raw (Sex Pistols album), recorded 1976, released 1997
- Raw (Shannon Noll album), 2021
- Raw (The Alarm album), 1991
- A Little More Personal (Raw), a 2005 album by Lindsay Lohan

=== Songs ===
- "Raw" (song), the lead single from Spandau Ballet's Heart Like a Sky
- "Raw", a song by Bad Meets Evil from the Southpaw soundtrack
- "Raw", a song by Staind from Dysfunction
- "Raw Raw", a song by K.Flay from Mono

== People ==
- Mr Raw, (born 1975), stage name of rapper Okechukwu Edwards Ukeje
- Robert Anton Wilson (1932–2007), an American author.
- The Mighty Raw, pseudonym of American musician Ron Wasserman (born 1961)
- David Raw (born 1944), English cricketer
- Harry Raw (born 1903), English footballer
- Nathan Raw (1866–1940), English physician and politician
- Peter Raw (1922–1988), Royal Australian Air Force officer
- Rowland Raw (1884–1915), English cricketer
- Simon Raw (born 1994), South African rugby union player
- Sydney Raw (1898–1967), Royal Navy vice admiral
- Vanessa Raw (born 1984), English triathlete
- Vause Raw (1921–2001), South African politician

== Organisations ==
- Research and Analysis Wing, or RAW, India's external intelligence agency
- Rosa Antifa Wien, an Austrian left-wing action group

== Other uses ==
- Raw, Northumberland, a former civil parish, now in Brinkburn, England
- Raw, North Yorkshire, England
- Raw (novel), 1998 novel by Scott Monk
- RAW (rolling papers), hemp based rolling papers introduced in 2005
- Raw (WWE brand), one of the WWE brands
- Radio Warwick, call letters RAW, the University of Warwick student radio station
- Raw Comedy Award, an Australian competition for stand-up comedians
- Rifleman's assault weapon, a rocket-propelled rifle-launched standoff munition
- RAW (restaurant), a restaurant in Taipei, Taiwan

== See also ==
- Raww, an American music group
- Rawe (disambiguation)
- Rau (disambiguation)
