= Saint-Louis department =

Coordinates: 16°01′56″N 16°37′00″W

Saint-Louis
- Department
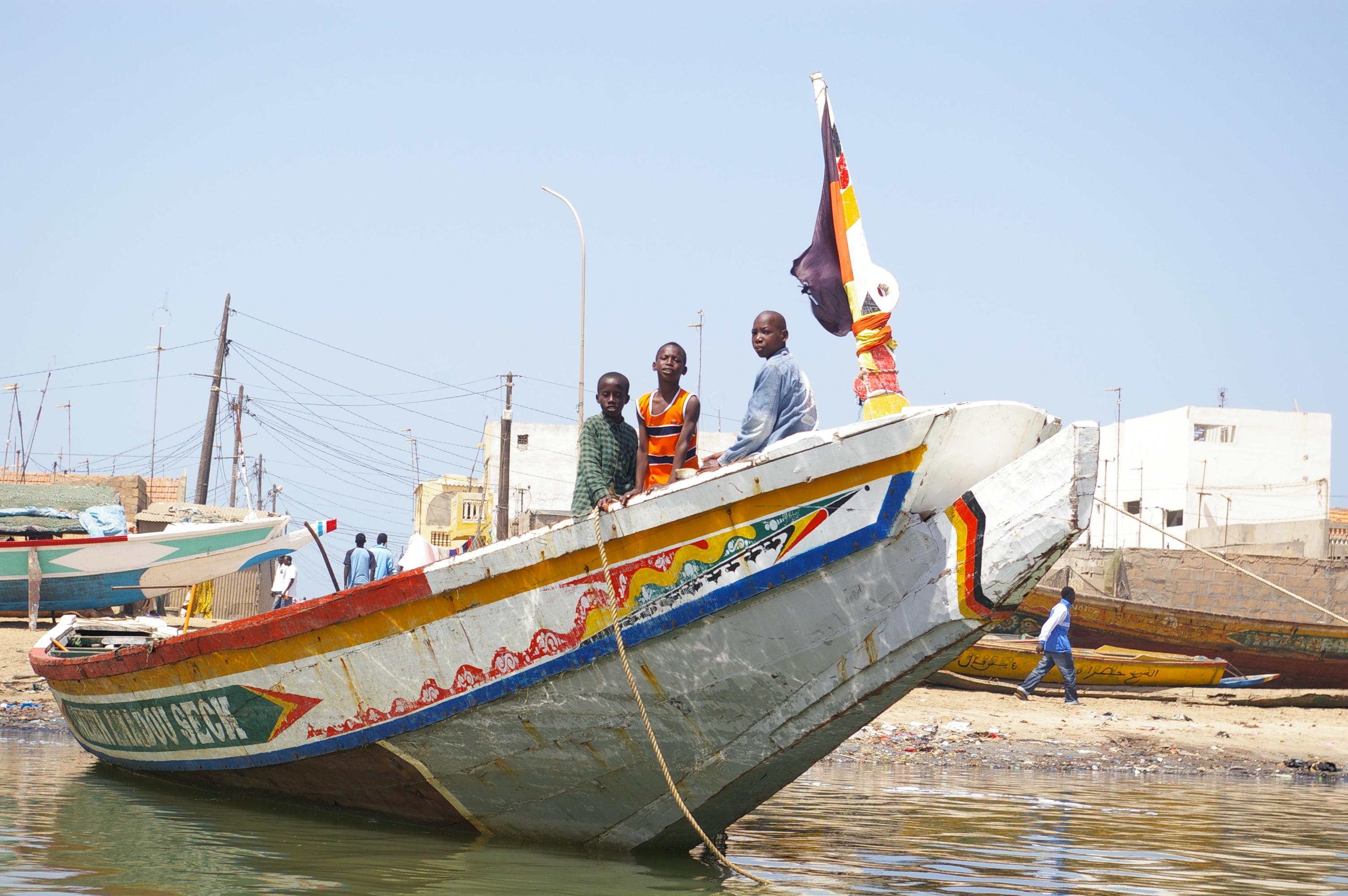

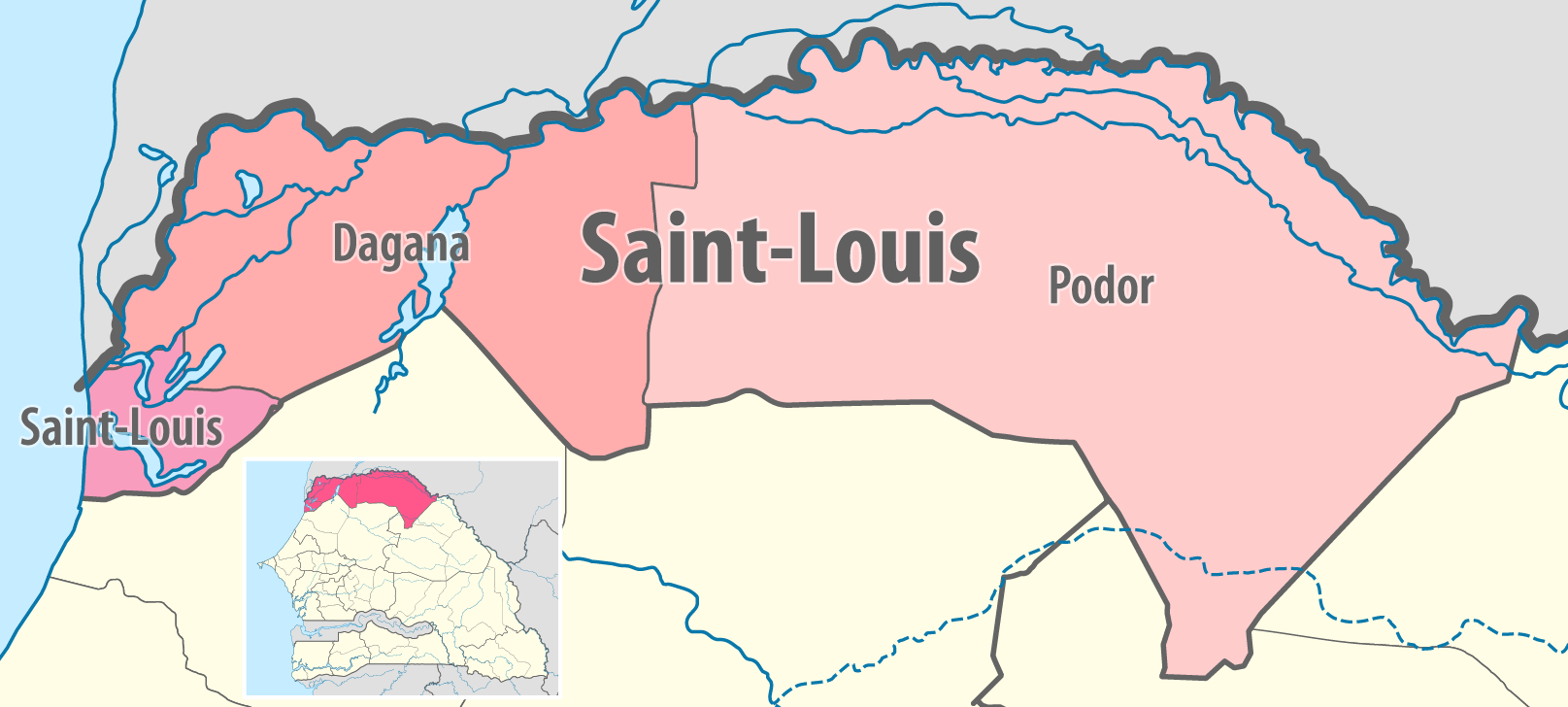
- Location in the Saint-Louis region
- Country: Senegal
- Region: Saint-Louis region
- Capital: Saint-Louis

Area
  - Total: 879 km^{2} (339 sq mi)

Population (2023 census)
  - Total: 387,513
  - Density: 441/km^{2} (1,140/sq mi)
- Time zone: UTC+0 (GMT)

Saint-Louis department is one of the 46 departments of Senegal, located in the Saint-Louis region.

There are two communes in the department (Saint-Louis and Mpal). The department also contains a single arrondissement, Rao, which comprises three rural districts (communautés rurales) – Fass Ngom, Gandiole, and Gandon.

In 2023, the population was counted at 387,513.

== Historic sites ==
Saint-Louis town

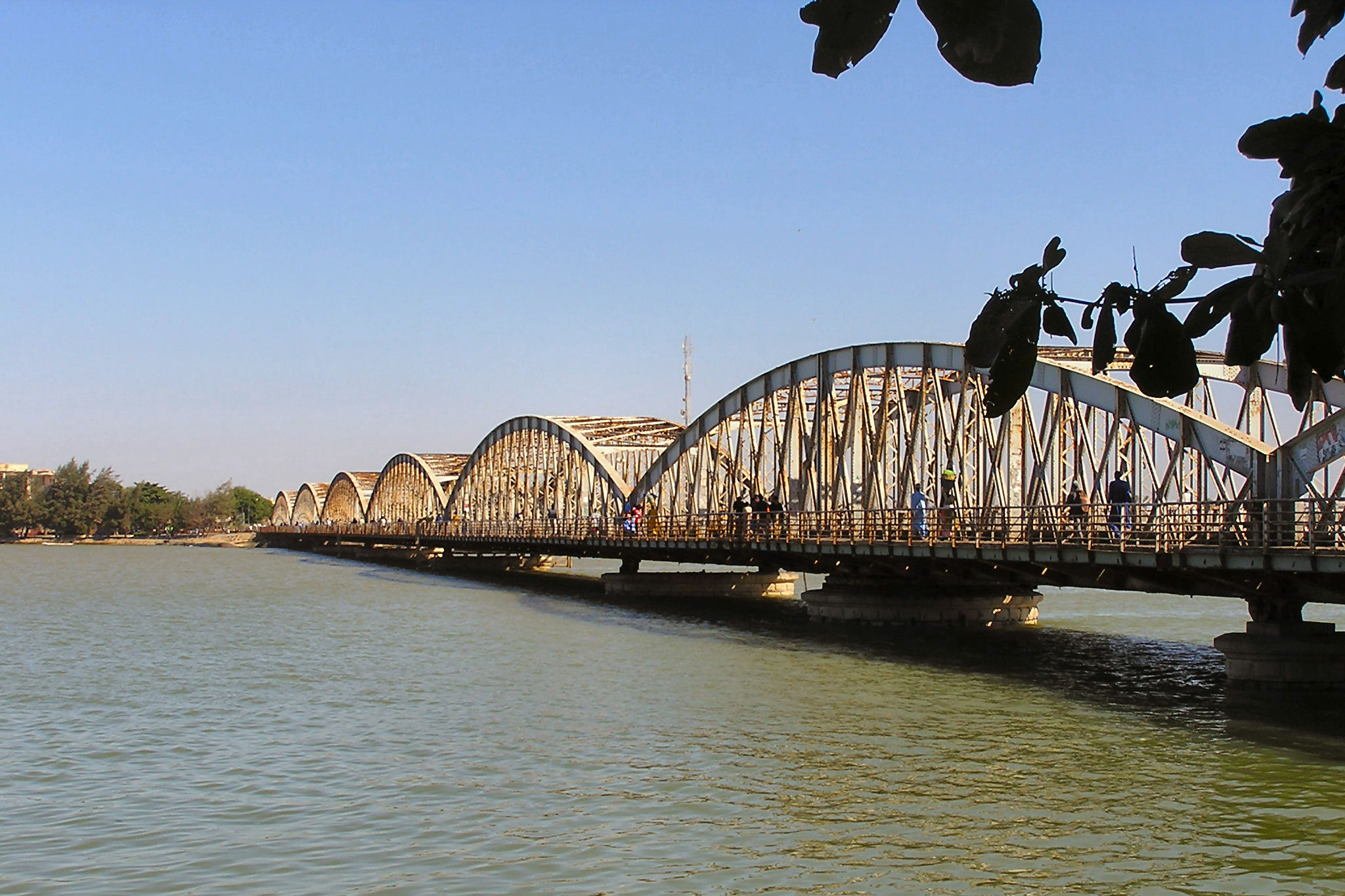
Faidherbe Bridge

- Island of Saint-Louis
- Faidherbe Bridge
- Ex-hydrobase and Stele at the statue of Jean Mermoz
- Fishermen's Cemetery, Langue de Barbarie
- Church and grotto of Notre-Dame de Lourdes, Sor Quarter, Saint-Louis
- Remains of the first brickworks of Africa – Bopp-ou-Thior Island (2 km from Saint-Louis)
- Keur Cluny : Old orphanage of the Soeurs de Saint-Joseph de Cluny, Ndar Toute, Saint-Louis
- Monument to Old Soldiers – Place Pointe à Pitre, Guet-Ndar
- Marmyale Catholic cemetery, Sor Quarter, Saint-Louis
- School of the Sons of the Chief and Spokesmen, Ecole Khayar Mbengue, Sor Quarter
- Railway Station
- Ancien Temple Protestant et Asile des esclaves, Pont de Khor Saint-Louis

Arrondissement de Rao

- Tumuli of Rao (Nguiguéla, Mboy-u-Gar, Menguègne)
- Tower of Ndialakhar
- Ruins of the Fort of Laybar, near Saint-Louis
- The historic site of the Village of Nder
- Ruins of the Post Ofiice of the bar at Mouit
- The prehistoric site of the Marigot of Khant
