= Faidherbe Bridge =

Road bridge in Senegal

Coordinates: 16°01′32.9″N 16°30′04.0″W

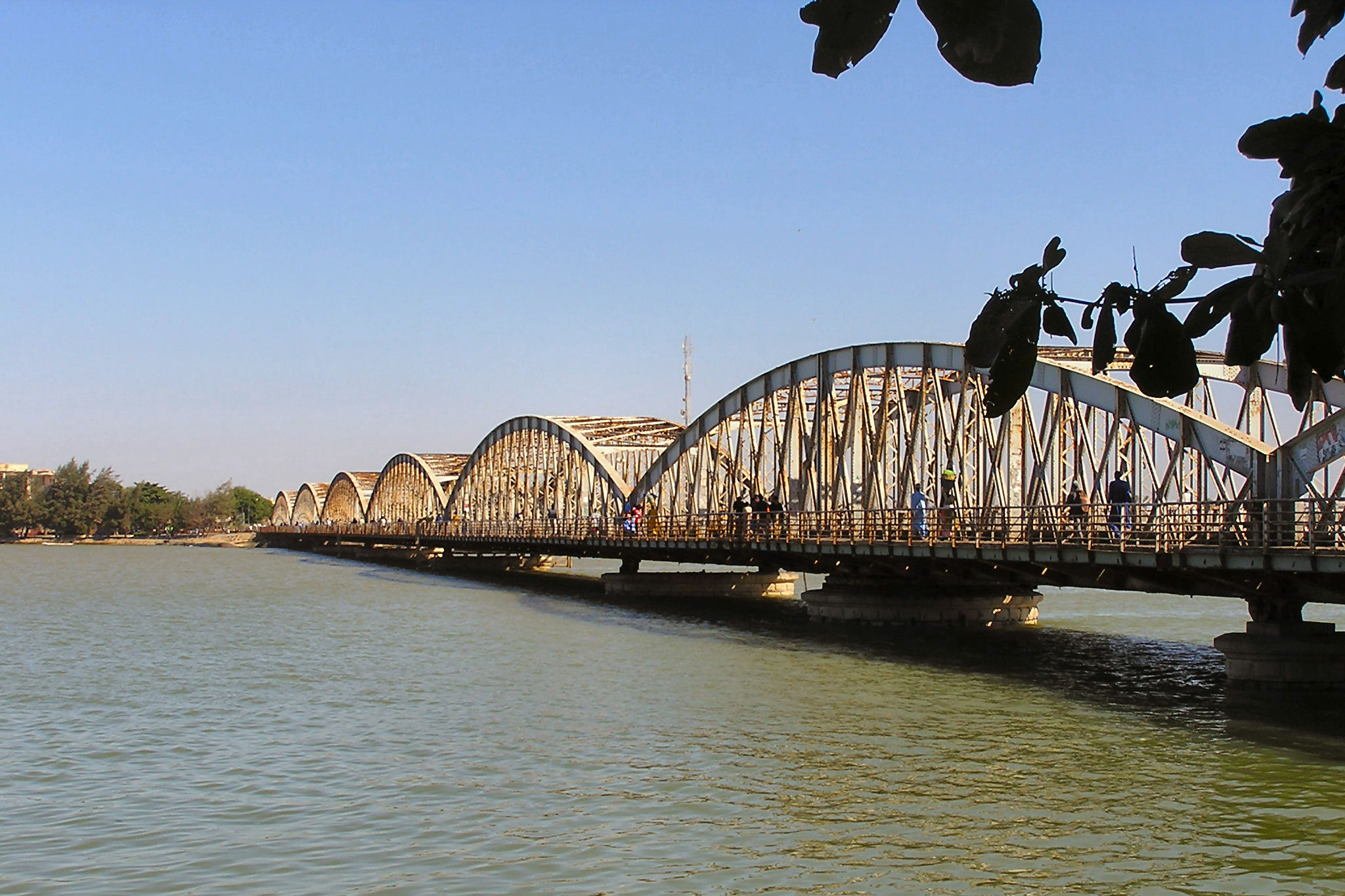
- General view of Faidherbe Bridge
- Span range: 507.35 m (1,664.5 ft)
- Material: Metal
- Movable: yes
- Design effort: Nouguier, Kessler et Cie
- Falsework required: No

Faidherbe Bridge (French: Pont Faidherbe) is a road bridge over the Senegal River which links the island of the city of Saint-Louis in Senegal to the African mainland. The metal bridge is 507.35 m (1,664.5 ft) long and 10.5 m (34 ft) wide, weighing 1,500 t (1,500 long tons; 1,700 short tons). It has eight spans, of which the longest five are 78.26 m (256.8 ft).

Until the 19th century, access to the island was made through boats. After the introduction of a ferry that could transport 150 passengers, Louis Faidherbe quickly saw that the system was clearly overrun and decided to construct the first bridge over the Sénégal River. The governor of Senegal, Henri de Lamothe decided to take a loan worth five million gold francs to construct a new metallic bridge in Saint-Louis. After the construction company was selected, they all decided to construct a new metallic bridge with a section capable of turning 90 degrees to allow the passage of ships. The bridge was opened on July 14, 1897. In the 2000s, a US$27 million rehabilitation plan has been inaugurated.

== The first bridge ==
The city of Saint-Louis, the first capital of the French West Africa, is situated on an island near the estuary of the Sénégal River. It is separated from the Atlantic Ocean by a thin 40 kilometres (25 mi) strip of sand called the Langue de Barbarie, which starts from Ndiago in Mauritania and extends all the way to Saint-Louis. The suburbs of Guet Ndar and Ndar-Tout are situated in this area. Until the 19th century, access to the island was by boat. Troops, horses and the equipment of the French colonial army all had to be transported by small boats.

In 1858, Louis Faidherbe, the governor of Senegal, inaugurated the Bouteville boat that was capable of transporting 150 passengers, animals and all kinds of goods. The boat made ten crossings every day and the fares differed: five centimes for a person, 50 centimes for a horse, cow or camel, and two francs for a carriage. In less than a year it was obvious that this system was insufficient and a second boat was introduced but with no success.

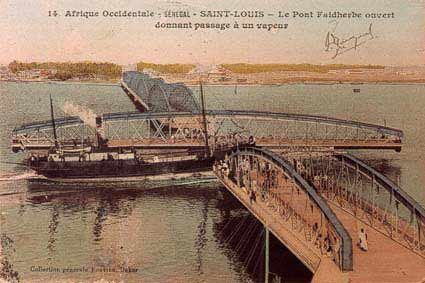
The old Faidherbe Bridge

Seeing this, the frigate captain Robin, friend of Louis Faidherbe, asked Prince Jérôme Napoléon, Minister of Algeria and the African Colonies, for approval for construction of a floating bridge. Opened on July 2, 1865, the bridge had a total length of 680 m (2,230 ft) (the floating part of the bridge had a length of 350 m or 1,150 ft) and a width of 4 m (13 ft). The floating part was formed from 40 metal pontoons which supported a wooden deck. Three of these pontoons were specially designed so that it could be created a 20 m (66 ft) gap so that large vessels could pass. The bridge was named Faidherbe Bridge by a decree of Napoleon III of France.

The opening in 1885 of the Saint-Louis–Dakar railway increased the traffic over the bridge. The railway reached all the way to Sor and all the goods hauled between the coast and the railway station had to cross over the bridge. To prevent the breakdown of the bridge a special decree was given so that the maximum weight for a vehicle that crosses the bridge to be less than one and a half tonnes. With all its difficulties the bridge remained in service 32 years, until 1897 when it was dismantled.

== Construction of a new bridge ==
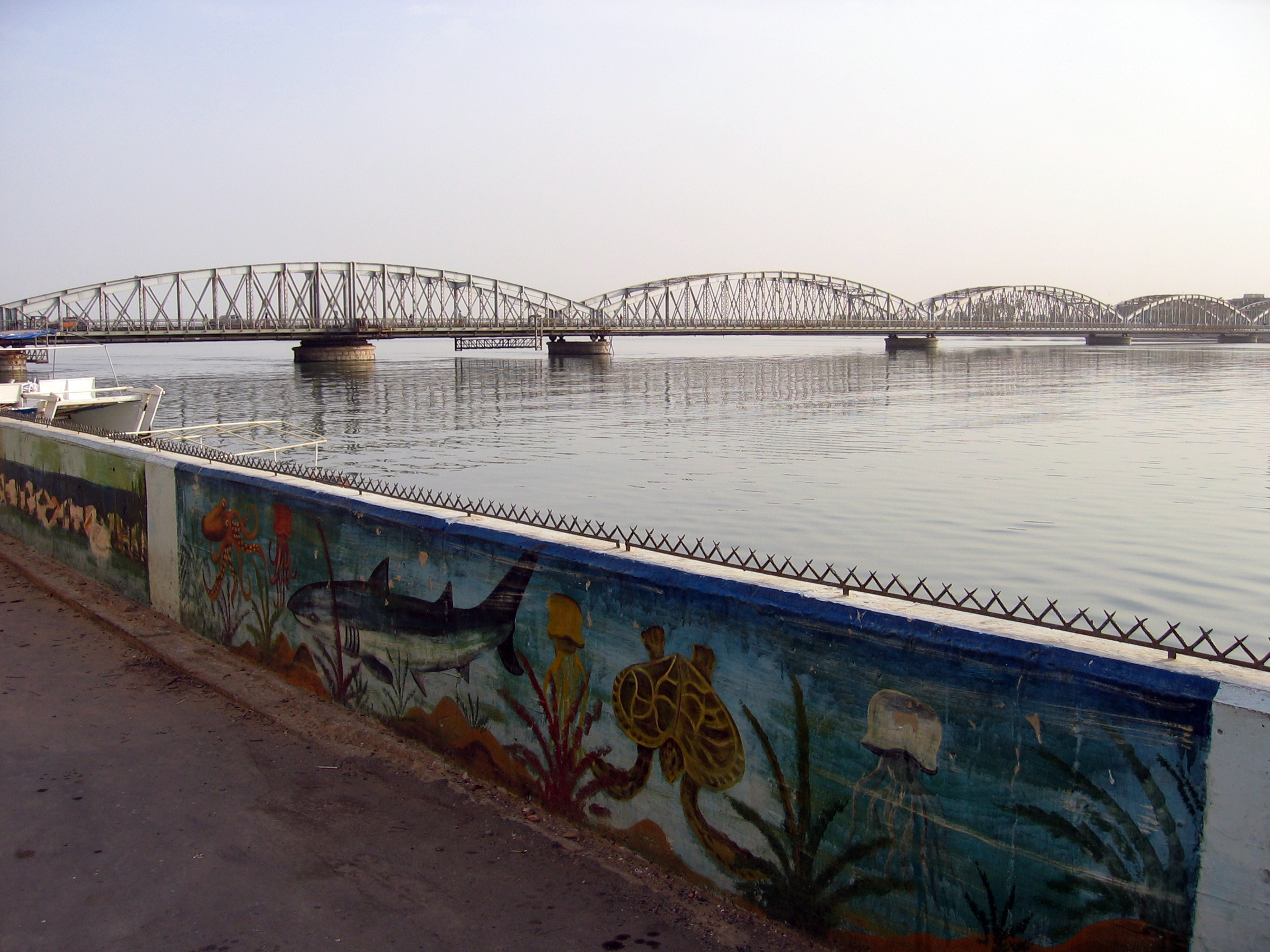
Faidherbe Bridge from Saint-Louis.

In the opening of his speech in the General Council of Senegal, governor Henri de Lamothe proposed that the country should take a loan for infrastructure development. The council agreed on a loan worth five million gold francs, much of the money being for the construction of a metallic bridge between Saint-Louis and Sor. The loan was approved on November 2, 1892, by the French president Marie François Sadi Carnot. A French bank, CDG, agreed to give the loan with a low interest of only four percent.

The auction was organised by the Ministry of Colonies, which sent five officers to Senegal for evaluation. After examining each one these offers the Faidherbe Bridge Committee selected two of them, from Nouguier, Kessler et Cie, and from Société de Construction de Levallois-Perret (owned by Gustave Eiffel). The Faidherbe Bridge Committee and the technical committee in Paris agreed that the Société de Construction de Levallois-Perret project was the best for the site. On the other hand, the president of the public works in Senegal and councilman Jean-Jacques Crespin supported the Nouguier, Kessler et Cie project. In the end the contract was awarded to Nouguier, Kessler et Cie at a price of 1.88 million gold francs.

== Link with King Carol I Bridge ==
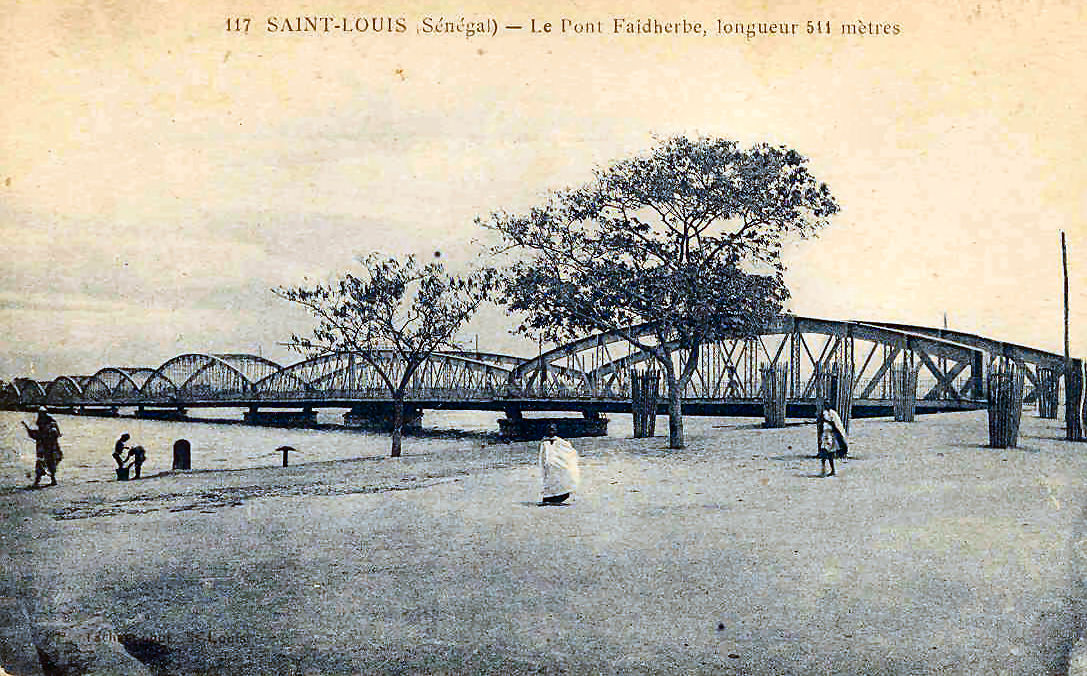
Period post card, illustrating the Faidherbe Bridge

There are many myths regarding the construction of the Faidherbe Bridge which are present even today and are depicted in some tourist guides. The construction of the bridge is attributed to Gustave Eiffel. In general it says that the metallic parts of the bridge represents a gift from the French government and that the parts were originally designed for the King Carol I Bridge over the Danube River in Romania. Other sources say that the metallic parts were intended for a bridge in Austria-Hungary over the Danube River in Vienna or Budapest. Finally another myth regarding the beams of the bridge says that the parts were intended for an unspecified site but the vessel transporting mysteriously sunk and the authorities in Senegal took advantage of this situation and built a local bridge.

The information available in Romania for the King Carol I Bridge in Cernavodă, as well as the results of scientists in France, say that the myths are pure fiction. First of all the Romanian government never finalised the construction contract with the company of Gustave Eiffel or with another foreign company, making the decision to build the bridge only with local companies. The Cernavodă Bridge was made entirely by Romanians, fulfilling the design of Anghel Saligny, which was also the supervisor of the site. In these conditions, not knowing if the contract will be approved, it is unlikely that a foreign company would build the whole superstructure of the bridge. On the other hand, in Austria-Hungary there was no need to construct a low bridge like the Faidherbe because of the trade routes on the Danube River.

== Construction of the metallic bridge ==
The new bridge has a metal deck formed with riveted girders. The bridge has in total eight spans of which one span of 42.95 m (140.9 ft), two spans of 36.55 m (119.9 ft) and five spans of 78.26 m (256.8 ft). The total length of the bridge is 507.35 m (1,664.5 ft) and the width is 10.5 m (34 ft). The total weight of the deck is 1,500 t (1,500 long tons; 1,700 short tons). The second span from the city is mobile, being capable of turning 45 degrees to let small ships through.

== Opening ==
A first opening of the bridge took place in the same day with the ceremonies for the national day on July 14, 1897, in the presence of governor Chabié. The ribbon for the access zone was cut by the governor's wife, then the officials walked a short distance to the mobile deck, which was opened to allow the passage of the military ship L'Ardent. 21 cannon shots were fired at dusk and dawn to commemorate the construction of the bridge and on that day there were organised ceremonies including horse races and donkey races. The second opening was on October 19, 1897, in the presence of André Lebon, the prime minister of the French colonies.

== Modernisation and rehabilitation works ==
After more than 100 years since it was opened the bridge has suffered from corrosion and was in need of urgent repair. The rehabilitation works are co-financed by the French Development Agency (AFD) and by the Government of Senegal. The total cost of the works was estimated to be US$27 million, of which US$17 million is from AFD and US$10 million is from the government.

The spans of the bridge were replaced between November 2008 and 23 July 2011. The total work is expected to finish in mid-August and inaugurated in October 2011.
