= O'Rawe =

O'Rawe is a surname. Notable people with the surname include:

- Geraldine O'Rawe (born 1971), Northern Irish actress
- Pat O'Rawe (?–2017), Irish republican
- Richard O'Rawe, former IRA prisoner and author
- Catherine O'Rawe, author of books based on Italian Cinema

== See also ==
- Rawe (disambiguation)
