= Phillipp-Anders Rau =

German politician (born 1983)

Member of the Landtag of Saxony-Anhalt
- Incumbent
- Assumed office 6 October 2026
- Preceded by: Dietmar Krause
- Constituency: Zerbst

Personal details
- Born: 1983 (age 42–43)
- Party: Alternative for Germany (since 2013)

Phillipp-Anders Rau (born 1983) is a German politician (AfD), former porn actor and MP of Landtag of Saxony-Anhalt in 2026.

== Live ==
In 2009, Rau and an accomplice stole numerous items from a Munich hotel, including more than 100 towels and bedsheets alone. He was given a suspended sentence for this.

In 2012, Rau obtained a place in the Journalism/Media Management program at Magdeburg-Stendal University of Applied Sciences using a forged high school diploma. Rau stated that he had achieved a high school graduation grade of 1.0, although his actual grade point average was only 3.5. He later said that he had been addicted to cocaine during this time and was not liable for it.

In 2025 Rau initially denied the allegations and claimed he was „not a porn star“. He sued the newspaper Magdeburger Volksstimme to prevent any reporting on it. However, a court in Frankfurt am Main dismissed his lawsuit and ruled that he had participated in the recording of a professional pornographic video that was clearly intended for release.

He has been a city councillor of Gommern and a district councillor of Jerichower Land since 2019. Media reports have noted that Rau has prior convictions for theft and document forgery; he has also reportedly appeared in pornographic films.
