= Råö =

Coordinates: 57°23′N 11°55′E

Råö is a locality in Kungsbacka Municipality, Halland, Sweden.
