= Rheault =

Rheault or Rhéault is a family name. Notable people with the name include:

- François Messier-Rheault, Canadian cinematographer
- Jenna Rheault (born 1996), American ice hockey player
- Jon Rheault (born 1986) American ice hockey player
- Joseph-Eugène Rhéault (1856–1921), Canadian politician
- Robert Rheault (1925–2013), American military officer
- Wendy Rheault (born 1955), Canadian academic administrator
