= Alan S. Rau =

American lawyer

Alan S. Rau is an American lawyer, previously the Mark G. and Judy G. Yudof Chair in Law at University of Texas School of Law, and also previously a Distinguished Professor at Queen Mary University of London and the Fred Paulus Chair in Public Policy and at Willamette University College.
