= Rao Arrondissement =

Rao
- Arrondissement
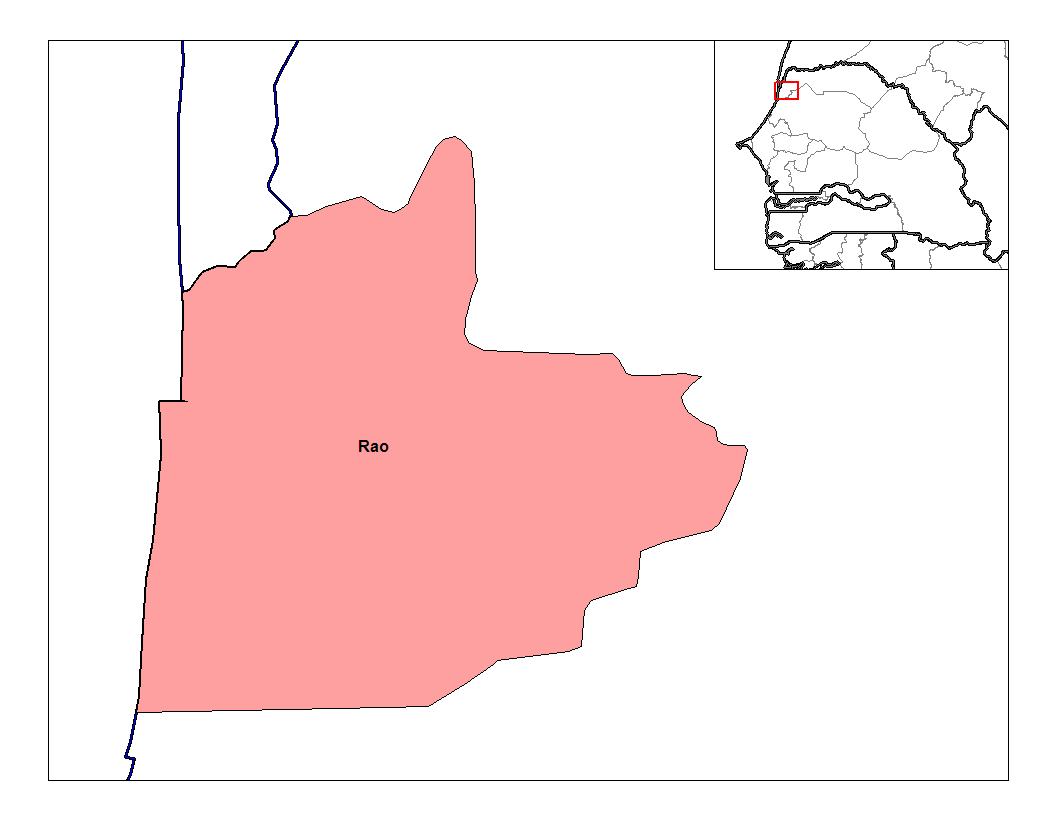
- Location in the Saint-Louis Department
- Country: Senegal
- Region: Saint-Louis Region
- Department: Saint-Louis Department
- Time zone: UTC±00:00 (GMT)

Rao Arrondissement is an arrondissement of the Saint-Louis Department in the Saint-Louis Region of Senegal. It is the area around Saint-Louis city.

== Subdivisions ==
The arrondissement is divided administratively into rural communities and in turn into villages.
