= Rawe Peak =

Mountain in Nevada, United States

Coordinates: 39°12′03″N 119°28′54″W

Rawe Peak is a summit in the U.S. state of Nevada. The elevation is 8,238 feet (2,511 m).

Rawe Peak was named after R. S. Rawe, a Sutro Tunnel Company official.
