= Langue de Barbarie =

Peninsula and national park in Senegal

Coordinates: 15°55′N 16°30′W

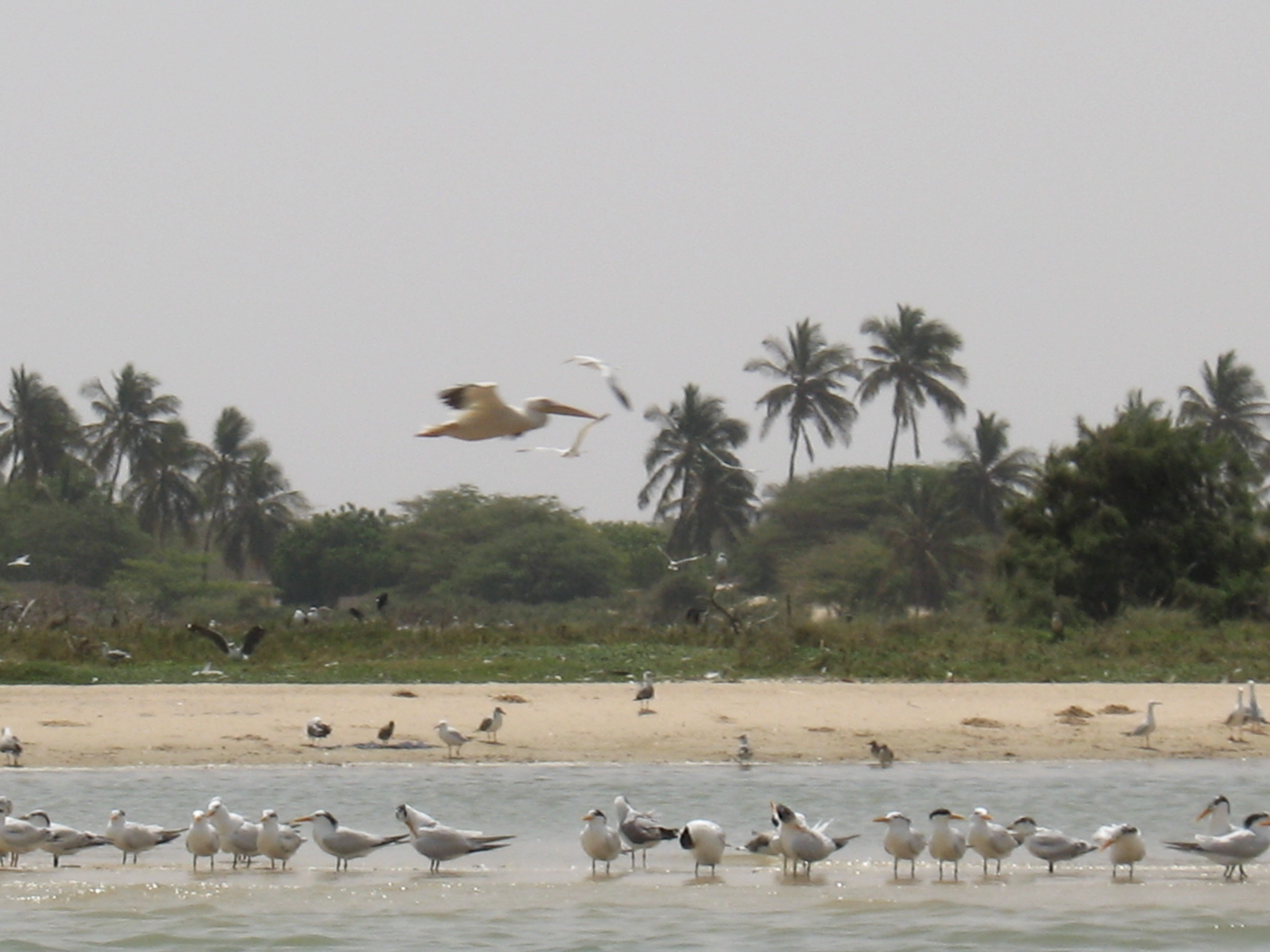
Birds flock on the beach at the Langue de Barbarie National Park, 2006.

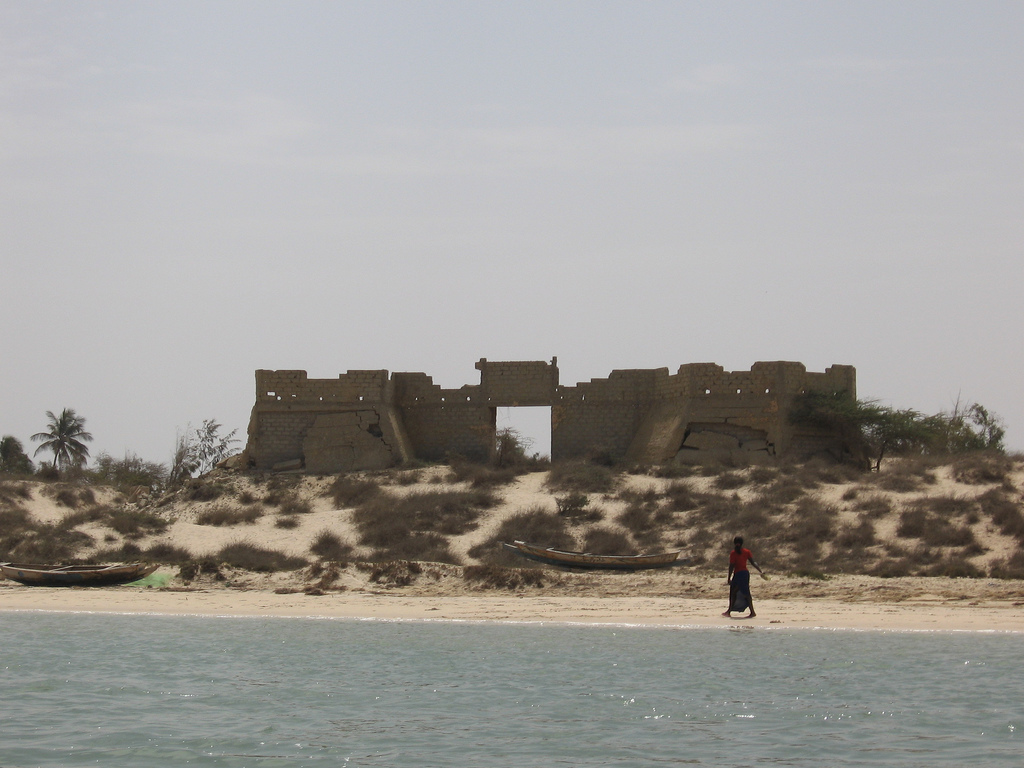
Ruins in the park

The Langue de Barbarie (French for "Barbary spit of land", named after the Barbary Coast) is a thin, sandy peninsula, adjacent to the Atlantic Ocean, located in western Senegal, in the neighbourhood of the city of Saint-Louis. The peninsula separates the ocean from the final section of the Senegal River.

== National park ==
Designations

Ramsar Wetland
- Official name: Parc National de la Langue de Barbarie
- Designated: 7 April 2021
- Reference no.: 2467

The Langue de Barbarie National Park (French: Parc National de la Langue de Barbarie) is located at the southern edge of the peninsula. Covering an area of 2,000 hectares (4,900 acres), it is home to an abundant variety of bird species and three species of turtle, including the critically endangered hawksbill sea turtle. The park was named a Ramsar site in 2021.

== 2003 breach and environmental disaster ==
Animation of the widening of the breach.

A 4 metres (13 ft) breach was cut in the peninsula near the city of Saint-Louis on 3 October 2003 to help counter possible flooding. However, the breach quickly widened to 800 m (2,600 ft) and separated the southern end of the peninsula permanently from the main country, effectively transforming it into an island. As of December 2013 the sea had claimed over 3 km (1.9 mi) of land and had caused the loss of villages and tourist resorts in addition to changes in the flora and fauna of the peninsula. By January 2020, the breach had widened to 6 km.
