= Saint-Louis, Senegal =

Saint-Louis Ndar
- City and commune
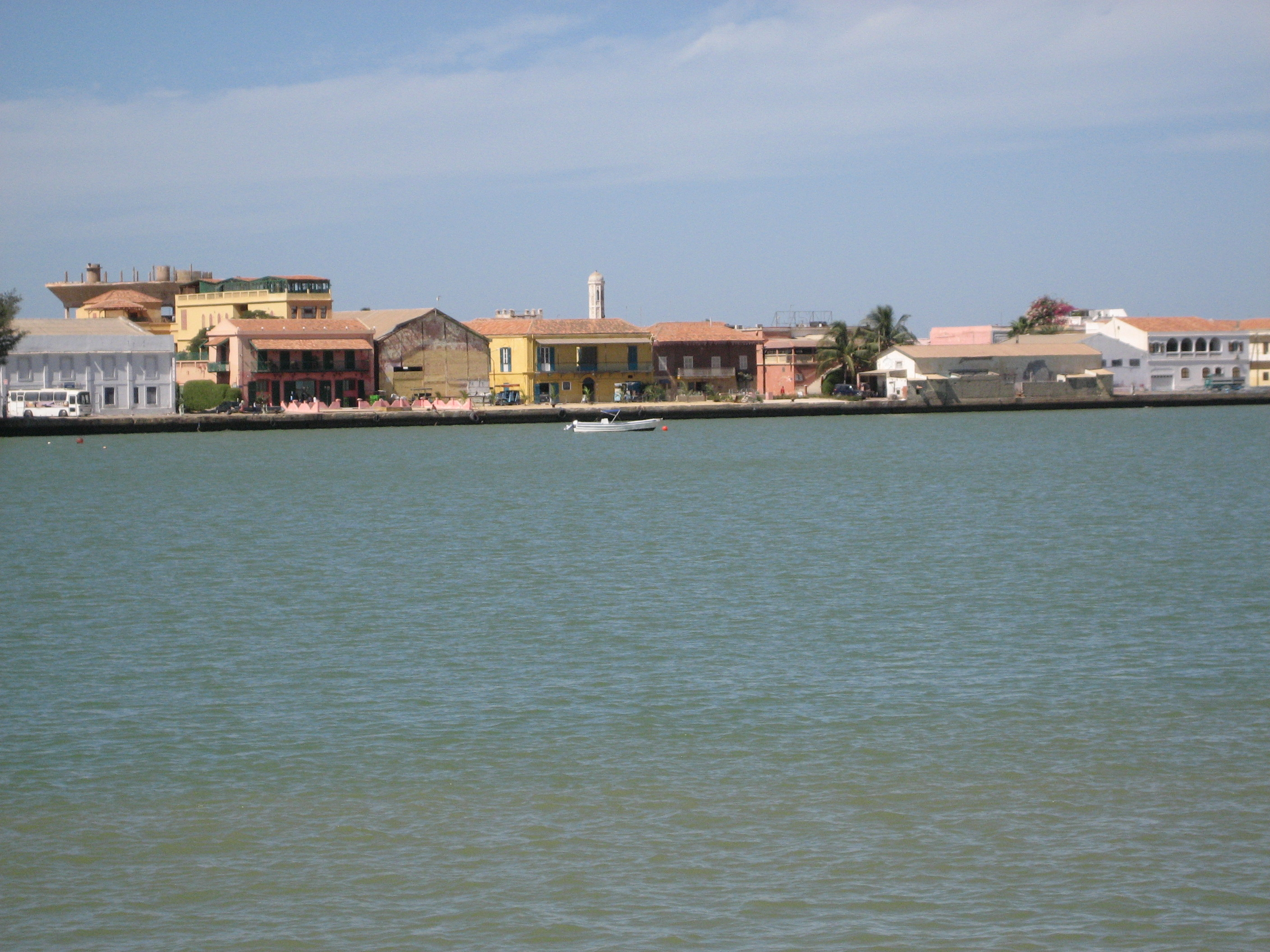
- Island of Saint-Louis

- Location in Senegal
- Coordinates: 16°02′N 16°30′W
- Country: Senegal
- Region: Saint-Louis Region
- Department: Saint-Louis Department
- Founded: 1659

Government
  - Mayor: Mansour Faye

Area
  - Total: 63.54 km^{2} (24.53 sq mi)

Population (2023 census)
  - Total: 254,171
  - Density: 4,000/km^{2} (10,360/sq mi)
- Time zone: UTC+00:00 (GMT)

UNESCO World Heritage Site
- Official name: Island of Saint-Louis
- Criteria: Cultural: ii, iv
- Reference: 956
- Inscription: 2000 (24th Session)

Saint-Louis (French pronunciation: [sɛ̃ lwi]) or Saint Louis (Wolof: Ndar), is the capital of Senegal's Saint-Louis Region. Located in the northwest of Senegal, near the mouth of the Senegal River, and 320 kilometres (200 mi) north of Senegal's capital city Dakar. It had a population of 254,171 in 2023. Saint-Louis was the capital of the French colony of Senegal from 1673 until 1902 and French West Africa from 1895 until 1902, when the capital was moved to Dakar. From 1920 to 1957, it also served as the capital of the neighboring colony of Mauritania.

The town was an important economic center during the period of French West Africa, but it is less important now. Nonetheless, it still has important industries, including tourism, a commercial center, sugar production, and fishing. The tourism industry is in part due to the city being listed as a UNESCO World Heritage Site in 2000. However, the city is also vulnerable to climate change—where sea level rise is expected to threaten the city center and potentially damage historical parts of the city; according to a Senegalese government study, up to 80% of the city could be at risk of flooding by 2080. Moreover, other issues such as overfishing are causing ripple effects in the local economy.

== Etymology ==
Saint Louis (French: Saint-Louis) is named after Louis IX, a canonized 13th-century king of France. Obliquely, the name also honored Louis XIV, the reigning king of France at the time of the island's settlement in 1659. It was originally known as Saint Louis of the Fort (St-Louis-du-Fort) after its stronghold and to distinguish it from other places of the same name. The Langue de Barbarie takes its name from the French for "Barbary Tongue", after an old name for the land of the Berbers.

The local name Ndar or N'dar is Wolof for a kind of island and has been borne by the island since before the French settlement. Ndar Tout or Toute is a Gallicized form of a Wolof name meaning "Little" or "Lesser Saint Louis". The neighborhood of Guet Ndar takes its name from a Wolof word for "pasture".

== Geography ==
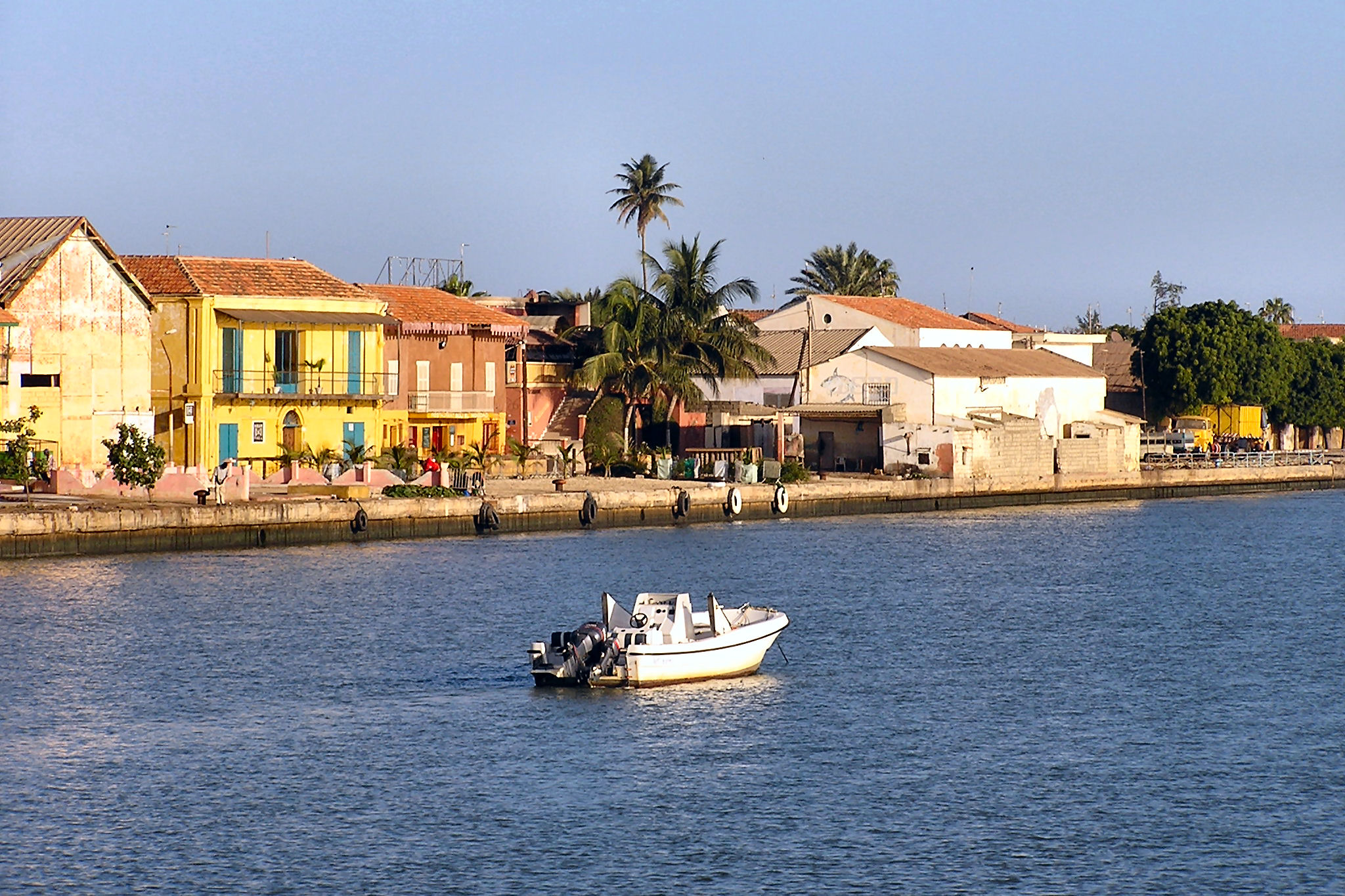
Langue de Barbarie

Saint-Louis is situated in northern Senegal, on the border with Mauritania, although the nearest border crossing is at Rosso, 100 km (62 mi) up the Senegal River.

The heart of the old colonial city is located on a narrow island a little more than 2 km (1.2 mi) long but only about 400 m (1,300 ft) wide. The island lies in the Senegal River. It is 25 km (16 mi) north of its mouth, but is only separated from the Atlantic Ocean to its west by the Langue de Barbarie, a 300 m (980 ft) wide sand spit. The Langue de Barbarie is the location of the seaside neighborhoods Ndar Toute and Guet Ndar. On the mainland, the east bank of the river is the site of Sor, an older settlement now considered a suburb of Saint-Louis. It is nearly surrounded by tidal marshes.

Three characteristics give Saint-Louis its distinctive geographic appearance: the Sahel, the marshes and the Langue de Barbarie.

Part of the Sahel, a transitional desertic band that separates "[...] the dunes of the Sahara from the baobabs of the savanna", Saint-Louis' landscape is characterized by occasional acacias and is disturbed by sand storms during the dry season.

The marshes are flood basins that form during the rainy season when the river overflows into the countryside, creating ponds and stretches of mangroves that attract birds like flamingos and pelicans.

The Langue de Barbarie, over a stretch of 25 km (16 mi), separates the lower Senegal River from the Atlantic Ocean. Its vegetation mainly consists of Filao trees, propagated to prevent soil erosion in sandy and salty soils.

=== Natural sites ===
Among Saint-Louis' numerous natural sites are the National Park of the Langue de Barbarie, the National Park of the Birds of Djoudj, the Fauna Reserve of Gueumbeul, beaches like that of the Langue de Barbarie, the colonial waterworks at Makhana, the palace of Baron Roger at Richard-Toll, the Diama Dam, and various hunting lodges on the south side of the Senegal River.

This park, which is 20 square kilometres large, occupies the southern point of the Langue de Barbarie, the estuary of the Senegal river and part of the continent. It hosts thousands of water birds like cormorants, brushes, pink flamingos, pelicans, herons and ducks each year.

The world's third largest ornithological park, it is located 60 kilometers north of Saint-Louis. This park occupies over 120 km^{2} and includes part of the river, and many lakes, basins, and marshes. About 3 million migrating birds of 400 species visit it each year.

Located at a dozen kilometers south of the city of Saint-Louis, this reserve has an area of 7 square kilometres and shelters birds and endangered species such as the dama gazelle, the Patas monkey and the African spurred tortoise.

=== Climate ===
Saint-Louis has a hot desert climate (Köppen climate classification BWh). It only has two seasons, the rainy season from June to October, characterized by heat, humidity and storms, and the dry season from November to May, characterized by cool ocean breeze and dust from the Harmattan winds. A 2011 documentary described Saint-Louis as the African city most threatened by rising sea levels. Flooding is becoming worse, and by 2080 80% of the city will face flood risks.

Climate data for St.-Louis (1991–2020 normals)
Month	Jan	Feb	Mar	Apr	May	Jun	Jul	Aug	Sep	Oct	Nov	Dec	Year
Record high °C (°F)	38 (100)	41 (106)	42 (108)	45 (113)	46 (115)	44 (111)	38 (100)	38 (100)	41 (106)	42 (108)	41 (106)	40 (104)	46 (115)
Mean daily maximum °C (°F)	31.4 (88.5)	32.4 (90.3)	33.0 (91.4)	31.5 (88.7)	30.3 (86.5)	30.6 (87.1)	31.3 (88.3)	32.1 (89.8)	33.0 (91.4)	34.5 (94.1)	34.7 (94.5)	32.5 (90.5)	32.3 (90.1)
Mean daily minimum °C (°F)	16.1 (61.0)	17.1 (62.8)	17.8 (64.0)	18.3 (64.9)	19.7 (67.5)	22.7 (72.9)	24.5 (76.1)	25.1 (77.2)	25.1 (77.2)	24.0 (75.2)	20.3 (68.5)	17.4 (63.3)	20.7 (69.3)
Record low °C (°F)	7 (45)	7 (45)	13 (55)	10 (50)	12 (54)	17 (63)	17.6 (63.7)	19.5 (67.1)	17.6 (63.7)	10 (50)	8 (46)	10.2 (50.4)	7 (45)
Average precipitation mm (inches)	2.5 (0.10)	0.6 (0.02)	0.2 (0.01)	0.1 (0.00)	0.1 (0.00)	6.5 (0.26)	43.1 (1.70)	91.5 (3.60)	103.7 (4.08)	23.7 (0.93)	0.1 (0.00)	0.3 (0.01)	272.4 (10.72)
Average precipitation days (≥ 1.0 mm)	0.1	0.3	0.1	0.0	0.1	0.5	3.3	7.1	7.1	1.8	0.0	0.1	20.5
Average relative humidity (%)	44.0	49.5	56.5	65.0	69.5	76.0	78.5	80.0	78.5	70.0	54.0	45.0	63.9
Mean monthly sunshine hours	241.8	238.0	275.9	285.0	282.1	222.0	244.9	248.0	228.0	260.4	246.0	232.5	3,004.6
Source 1: NOAA (sunshine 1961–1990)
Source 2: Weatherbase

== History ==
=== Founding ===
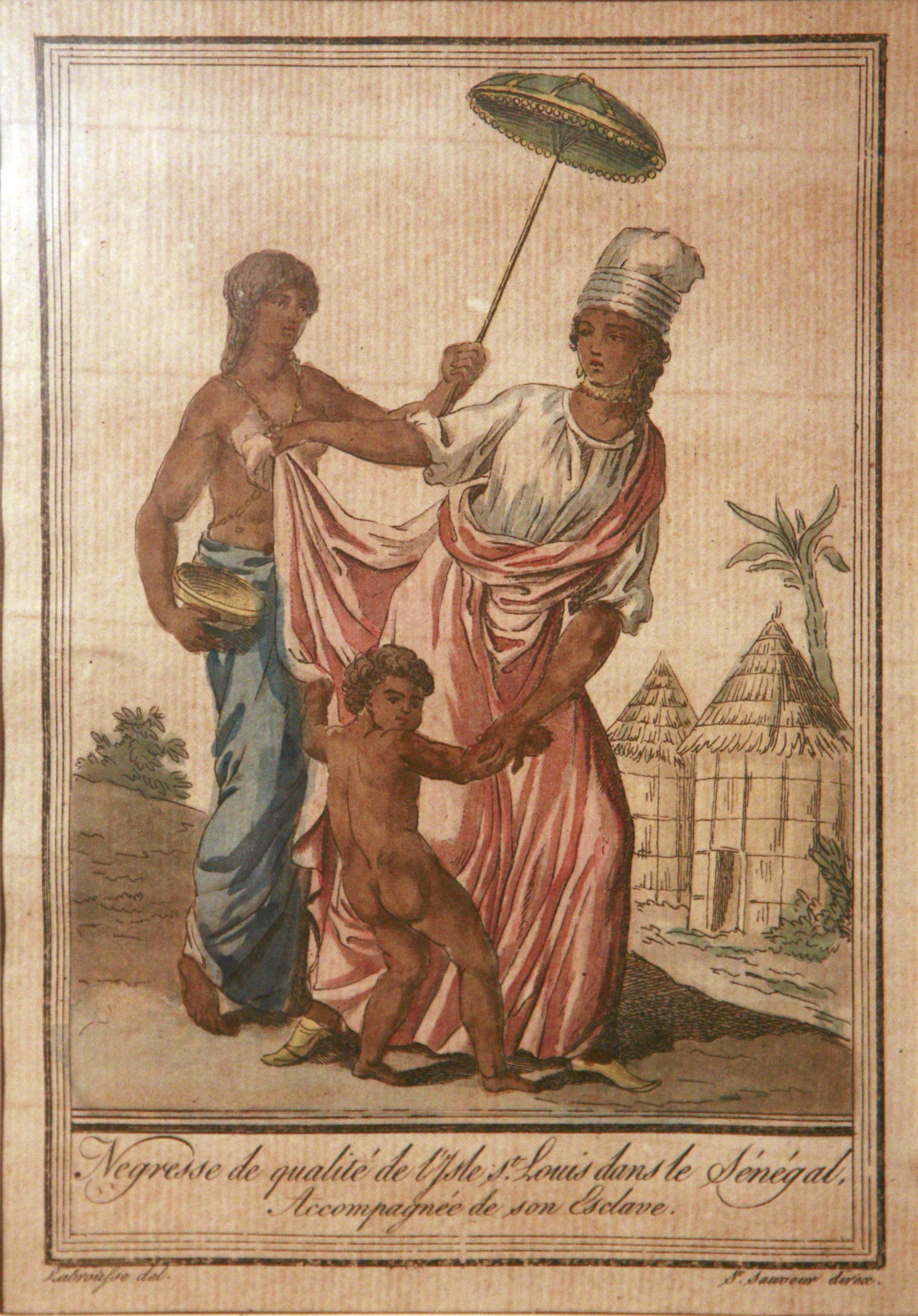
Negresse of quality from the Island of Saint Louis in Senegal, accompanied by her slave, Illustration from Costumes civils de tous les peuples connus, Paris, 1788, by Jacques Grasset de Saint-Sauveur.

A Wolof settlement at what is now known as Guet Ndar dates from around 1450 and was a meeting and departure point for Muslim pilgrims traveling to Mecca in Arabia. Portuguese, Dutch, and English traders visited the area over the next two centuries but the first nearby colonial fortification was erected by the French in 1638 on Bocos Island, about 25 km (16 mi) away.

Repeated flooding prompted the removal of the fort to the island known to locals as Ndar in 1659. The island was uninhabited at the time, supposedly because the local people believed it to be haunted by spirits. The Diagne of Sor, the local leader, permitted French settlement on the island for annual payments of "three pieces of blue cloth, a measure of scarlet cloth, seven long iron bars, and 10 pints of eau de vie."

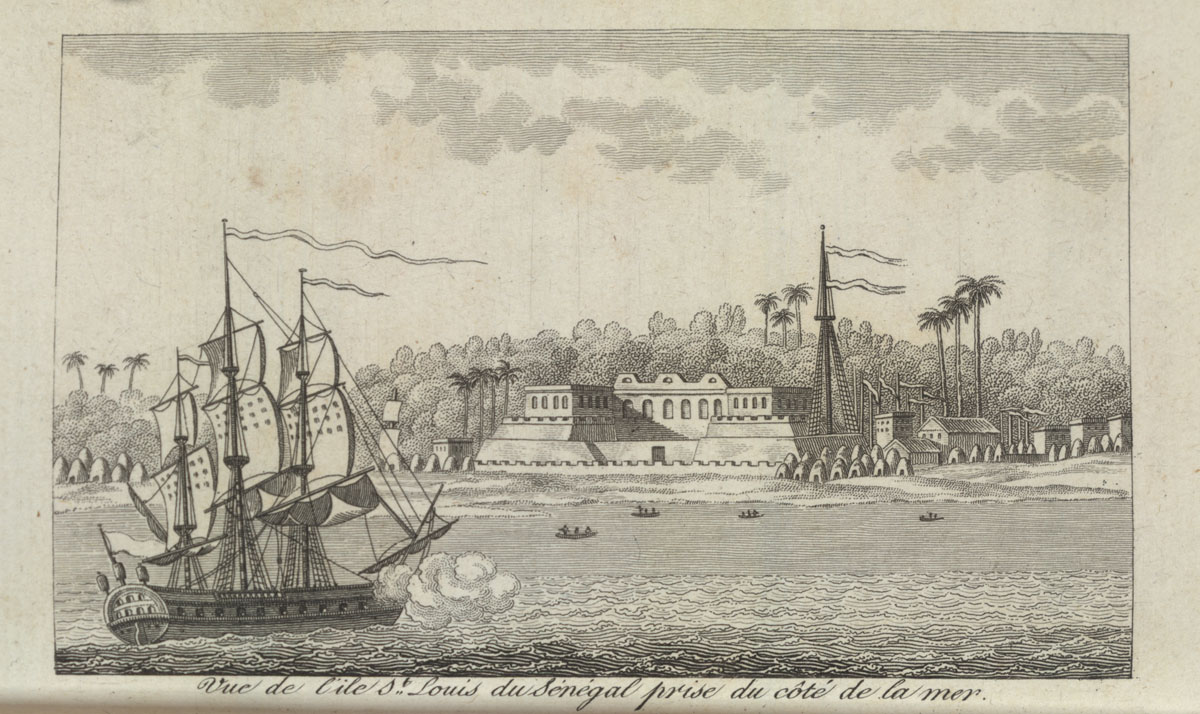
French view of the fort at Saint-Louis island, from "L'Afrique ou histoire, moeurs, usages et coutumes des Africains", by René Claude Geoffroy de Villeneuve, 1814.

=== Colonial capital ===
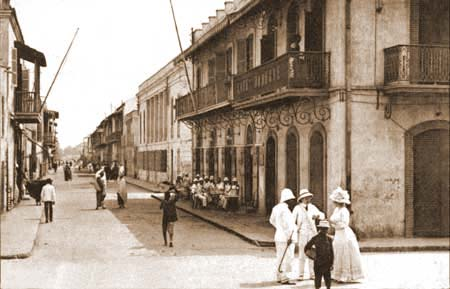
Colonial Saint Louis c. 1900. Europeans and Africans on the Rue Lebon.

The fortification permitted its factory to command foreign trade along the Senegal River. Slaves, gold, hides, beeswax, ambergris and, later, gum arabic were exported. During the Seven Years' War, British forces captured Senegal in 1758. In February 1779, French forces recaptured Saint-Louis. In the late 18th century, Saint-Louis had about 5,000 inhabitants, not counting an indeterminate number of slaves in transit.

Between 1659 and 1779, nine chartered companies succeeded one another in administering Saint-Louis. As in Gorée, a Franco-African Creole, or Métis, merchant community characterized by the famous "signares", or bourgeois women entrepreneurs, grew up in Saint-Louis during the 17th and 18th centuries. The Métis were important to the economic, social, cultural and political life of the city. They created a distinctive urban culture characterized by public displays of elegance, refined entertainment and popular festivities. They controlled most of the up-country river trade and they financed the principal Catholic institutions. A Métis mayor was first designated by the Governor in 1778. Civic franchise was further consolidated in 1872, when Saint-Louis became a French "commune".

After the decline of the Atlantic slave trade after 1790, the trade in gum arabic replaced it as the major economic engine of Saint Louis. Trade was increasingly concentrated in the lower river valley and the desert-side escales, rather than further upriver in Gajaaga as it had been previously. The city was again captured by the British during the Napoleonic Wars, and returned to France in 1817. Facing a near-total dependence on gum, the French authorities tried to promote plantation agriculture in Waalo from 1819 to 1830, but this failed. At the same time, Saint Louis grew massively during this period in both population in commercial activity.

Throughout the 19th century, the French periodically warred with the Emirate of Trarza and other Hassani tribal states, which disrupted the flow of gum. Nevertheless, with the removal of trade restrictions in 1848 and in 1853, exports soared. When war again broke out in 1854, the Arab Emirs forbade the Berber zwaya merchants from selling to the French, but this had little effect. In the 1855 Battle of Leybar Bridge a small force of French Marines defended the town from a large Trarza force. With the French victory in 1858, they were able to set the terms of trade on the river.

Louis Faidherbe, who became the Governor of the Colony of Senegal in 1854, contributed greatly to the development and modernization of Saint Louis. His large-scale projects included the building of bridges, provisioning of fresh drinking water, and the construction of an overland telegraph line to Dakar. Saint-Louis became capital of the federation of French West African colonies in 1895, but relinquished this role to Dakar in 1902.

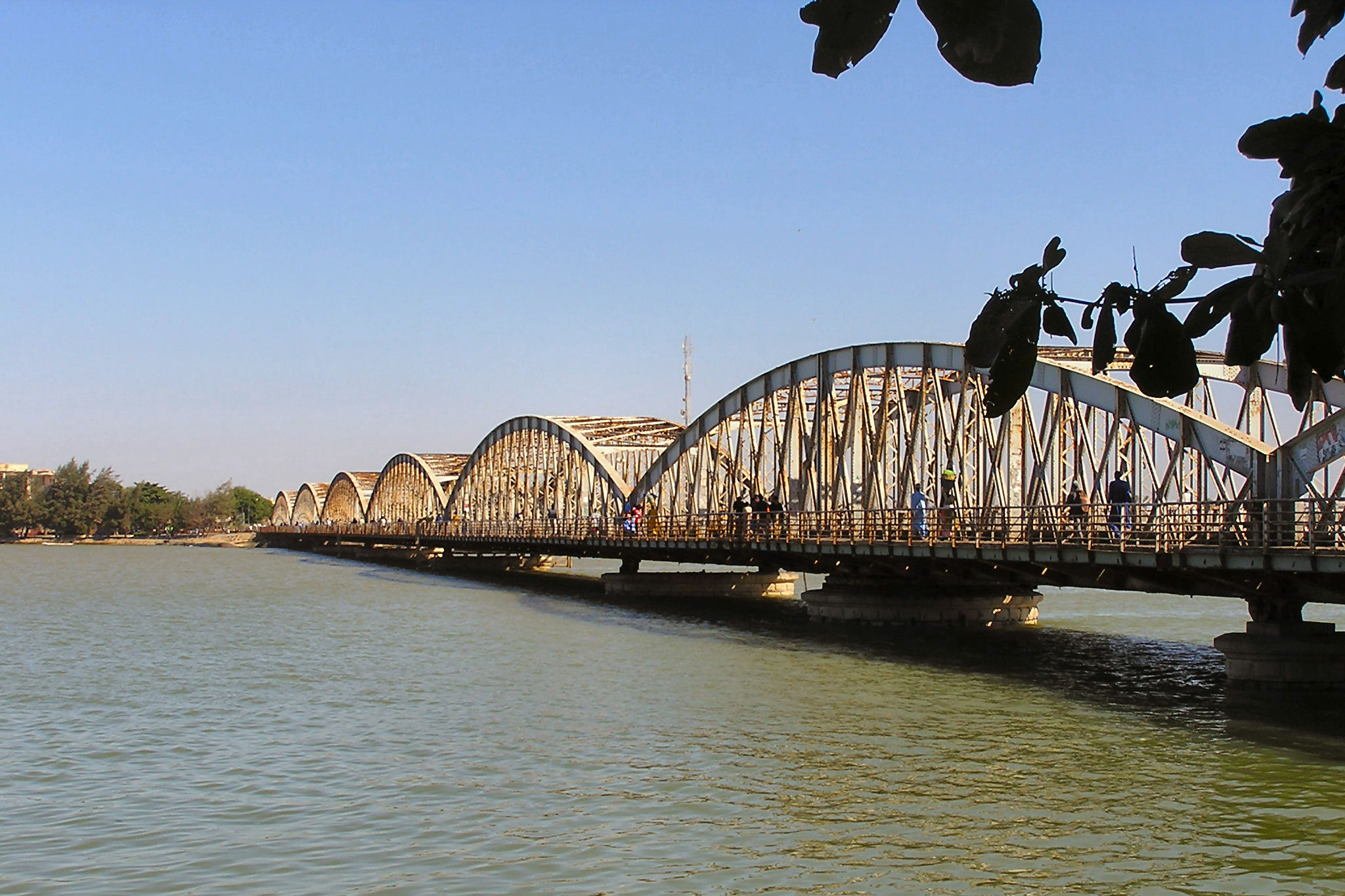
Faidherbe Bridge, the symbol of the city.

Saint-Louis's fortunes began to wane as those of Dakar waxed. Access to its port became increasingly awkward in the age of the steamship and the completion of the Dakar-Saint Louis railroad in 1885 meant that up-country trade effectively circumvented its port. Large French firms, many from the city of Bordeaux, took over the new commercial networks of the interior, marginalizing the Métis traders in the process. Saint-Louis nonetheless maintained its status as capital of the Colony of Senegal even after Dakar assumed the role of capital of the French West Africa federation. The colonial institutions set up in the city in the 19th century, such as the Muslim Tribunal and the School for Chiefs' Sons, were to play important roles in the history of French Africa. Though relatively small in size (population of 10,000 in 1826; 23,000 in 1914, and 39,000 in 1955) Saint-Louis dominated Senegalese politics throughout the 19th and early 20th centuries, not least because of its numerous political parties and associations and its independent newspapers.

=== Independence ===
Following independence, when Dakar became sole capital of the country, Saint-Louis slipped into a state of lethargy. As its French population and military departed, many of the town's shops, offices and businesses closed. The loss of jobs, human potential, and investment caused its economic decline. The loss of its past status meant less recognition and lack of interest from the colony's officials and, after Senegal's independence, from the Senegalese government. When its most famous political son, the French-educated lawyer Lamine Guèye, died in 1968, the city lost its strongest proponent.

Since 1993, the city has hosted the Saint Louis Jazz Festival, a major tourist draw.

== Environmental issues ==
Between 2016 and 2017, Saint-Louis experienced a large decline in the catch of fish brought in, causing ripple effects on nutrition and food supply in the country, where 75% of animal protein comes from fish. Fisherman from the community spend twice as much time for catching smaller hauls, and are now competing with foreign fishing vessels.

Rising sea levels, as well as water levels flowing out of the Senegal River now threaten the low-lying islands which make up the city. An ill-fated 2003 canal project exacerbated flooding issues, leading to submerged neighborhoods. In June 2008, Alioune Badiane of the United Nations' UN-Habitat agency designated Saint-Louis as "the city most threatened by rising sea levels in the whole of Africa", citing climate change and a failed 2004 river and tidal canal project as the cause. According to a Senegalese government study, up to 80% of the city could be at risk of flooding by 2080. As of 2020, the coast of the community has eroded by 1–2 meters a year.

== Economy ==
Saint Louis has economically declined since the transfer of the capital to Dakar, but has remained an important tourist and trading center. The city's economy, though not entirely recovered, is gradually reviving.

The city was listed as a UNESCO World Heritage Site in 2000 and cultural tourism has become an engine of growth. As a result, a process of gentrification has set in, with many historic buildings on the island being turned into restaurants and hotels.

Beyond tourism, Saint-Louis is also a commercial and an industrial centre for sugar production. Its other economic activities are fishing, irrigated alluvial agriculture, pastoral farming, trading and exportation of peanut skins. Each of these economic activities is assured by a particular ethnic group. The Wolofs and Lebous who are the main inhabitants of Saint-Louis are mostly fishermen that live in fishing communities like Guet-Ndar on the Langue de Barbarie. The Fulas live in the inland and practice pastoral farming. The Maures who are migrants from Mauritania (Saint-Louis is less than 10 kilometres or 6 miles south of the border with Mauritania) are mostly merchants, traders and shopkeepers found everywhere in Saint Louis.

== Culture ==
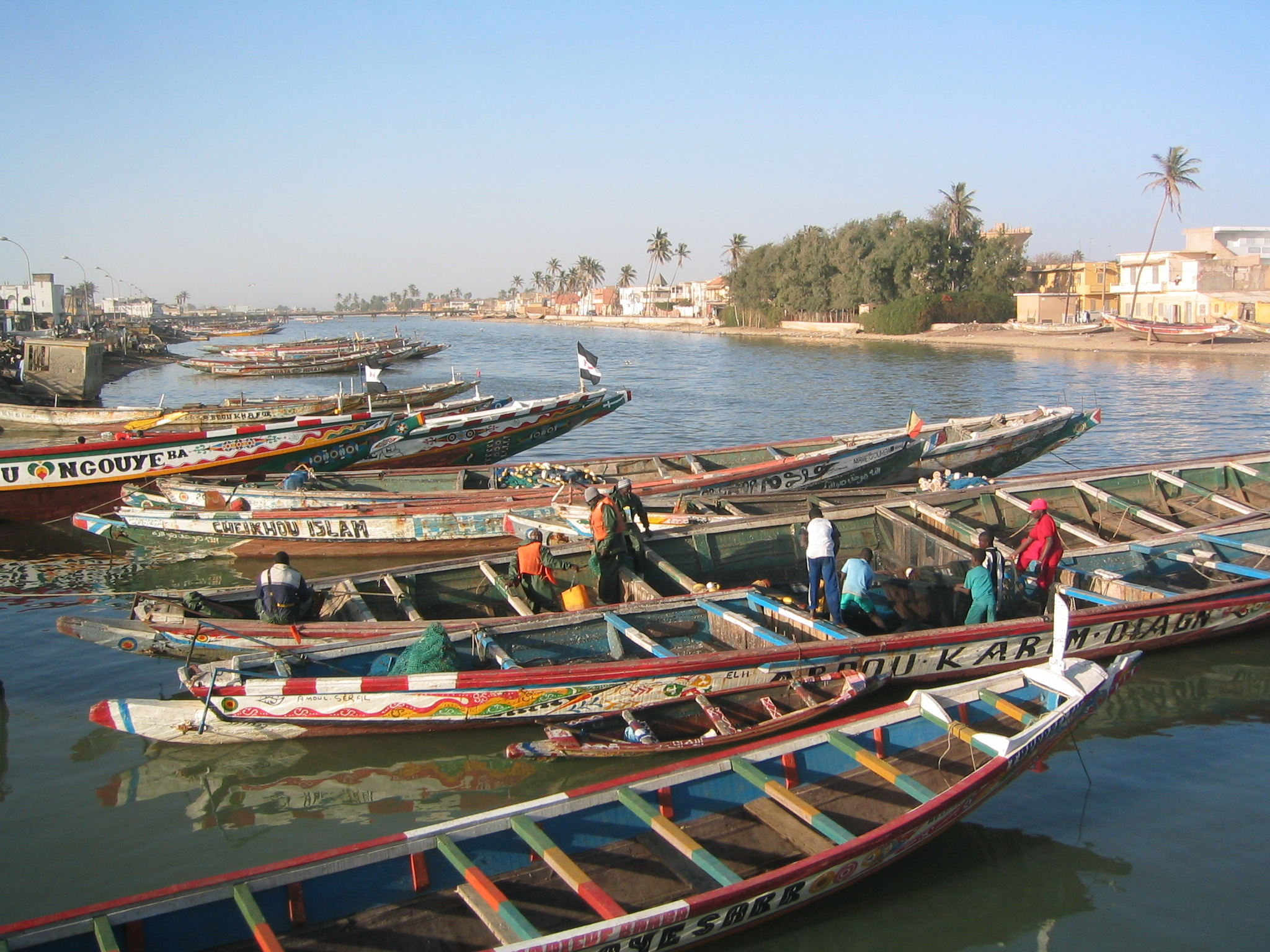
Pirogues, many painted with names of Sufi leaders, jam the Saint-Louis wharf. Today they are used for fishing, transport, and tourism.

Culture constitutes an important part of Saint-Louis' economy. The city preserves much of its 19th-century morphology, reminiscent of other cities of the "Creole Atlantic": Bahia, Cartagena, Havana and New Orleans. Thanks to its distinctive appearance, numerous sites of attraction and its international music festivals and cultural exhibitions, Saint-Louis attracts many tourists each year.

Saint-Louis remains the most characteristically French colonial destination in West Africa along with Gorée Island.

=== Museums ===
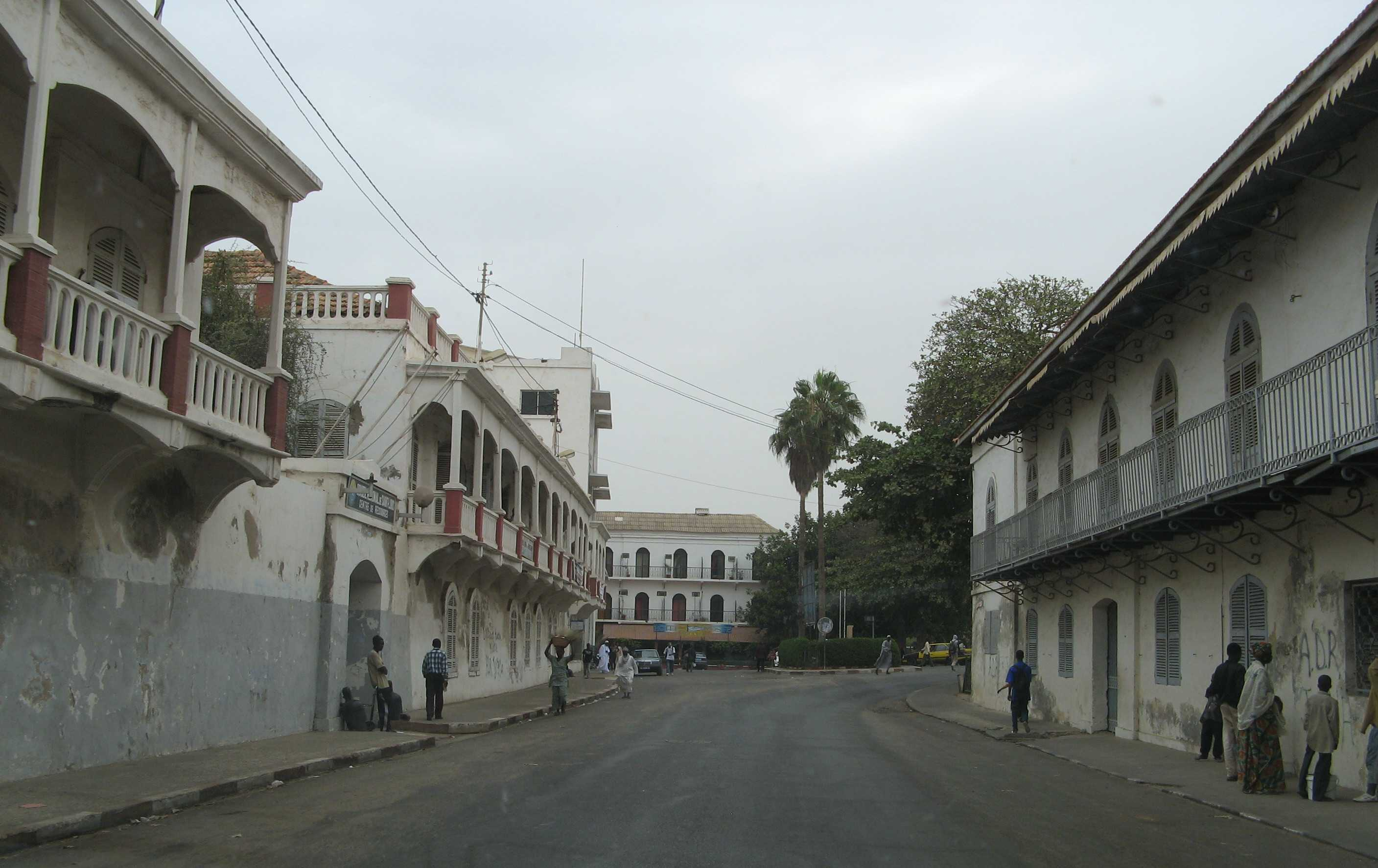
Colonial architecture lines the streets of the old city.

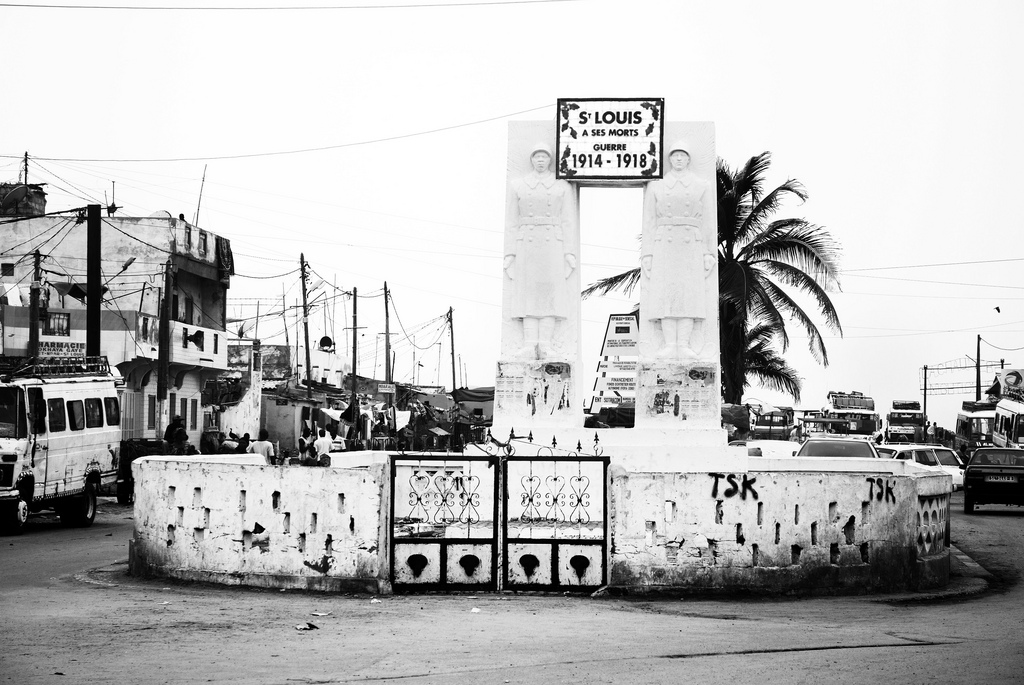
World War I Memorial

Saint-Louis' Research Center and Documentation Museum of Senegal offers interesting panoramas of Senegal's history and ethnic movements over the years, expositions of traditional clothes and musical instruments, etc.

=== Events and festivals ===
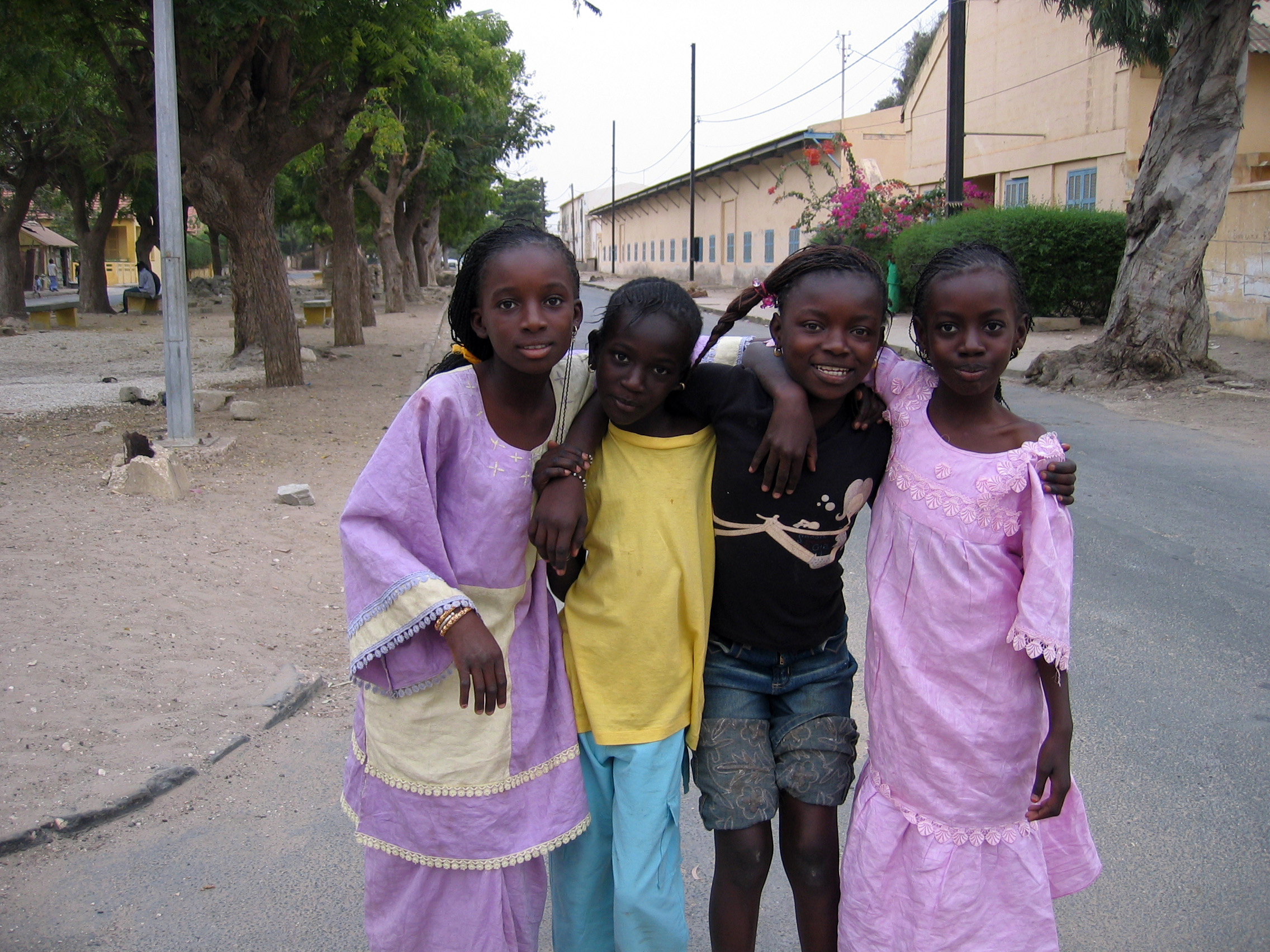
Girls gather on a street in Saint-Louis, 2007.

Saint Louis is famous for its urban culture. The heritage of the signares lives on in the city's many festivals and its cultivated sense of public display, and it is helping Saint-Louis emerge from decades of neglect. "Fanals", which are night-time processions of giant paper lanterns, take place at Christmas time.

The Saint-Louis Jazz Festival is the most important jazz festival in Africa. Jazz first became popular in the 1930s when records produced in Cuba were aired on the radio. After World War II, visiting U.S. GIs popularized jazz bands and by the 1950s local groups had adopted a "Cuban" sound. Another music festival, 1, 2, 3 musiques, exhibits various genres of music.

The Festival Métissons, held for the first time in 2010, is a grassroots music festival organized by local communities and small businesses. Every edition sports international, national and local musical talent.

The annual reggata, or pirogue race organized by teams of fishermen from Guet-Ndar, takes place on the "little branch" of the river, between Ndar Island and the Langue de Barbarie.

The Magal of the Niari Rakas, a yearly commemoration of Cheikh Ahmadou Bamba Mbacké's (the founder of Mouridism) two prayers in the Governor's Palace in 1895, is the city's largest religious gathering.

=== UNESCO World Heritage Site ===
Saint-Louis' characteristic colonial architecture along with its regular town plan, its location on an island at the mouth of the Senegal River and the system of quays, gives Saint-Louis the distinctive appearance and identity that have raised the island to the rank of world heritage since 2000. The Island of Saint-Louis is inscribed on the World Heritage list on the basis of criteria II and IV:

Criterion II The historic town of Saint-Louis exhibits an important exchange of values and influences on the development of education and culture, architecture, craftsmanship, and services in a large part of West Africa.

Criterion IV The Island of Saint-Louis, a former capital of West Africa, is an example of a colonial city, characterized by its unique natural setting which illustrates the development of colonial government in this region.

=== Architecture ===
Among interesting and attractive monuments and edifices are the Governor's Palace, the Gouvernance where are located the town's administrative offices, the Parc Faidherbe named for the French governor at the centre of town Louis Faidherbe, colonial-era hotels, the historic airport at Dakar-Bango on the mainland, the Faidherbe Bridge that connects the island to the Langue de Barbarie and the Gaol and Servatius bridges that connect the island to the continent.

==== Places of worship ====
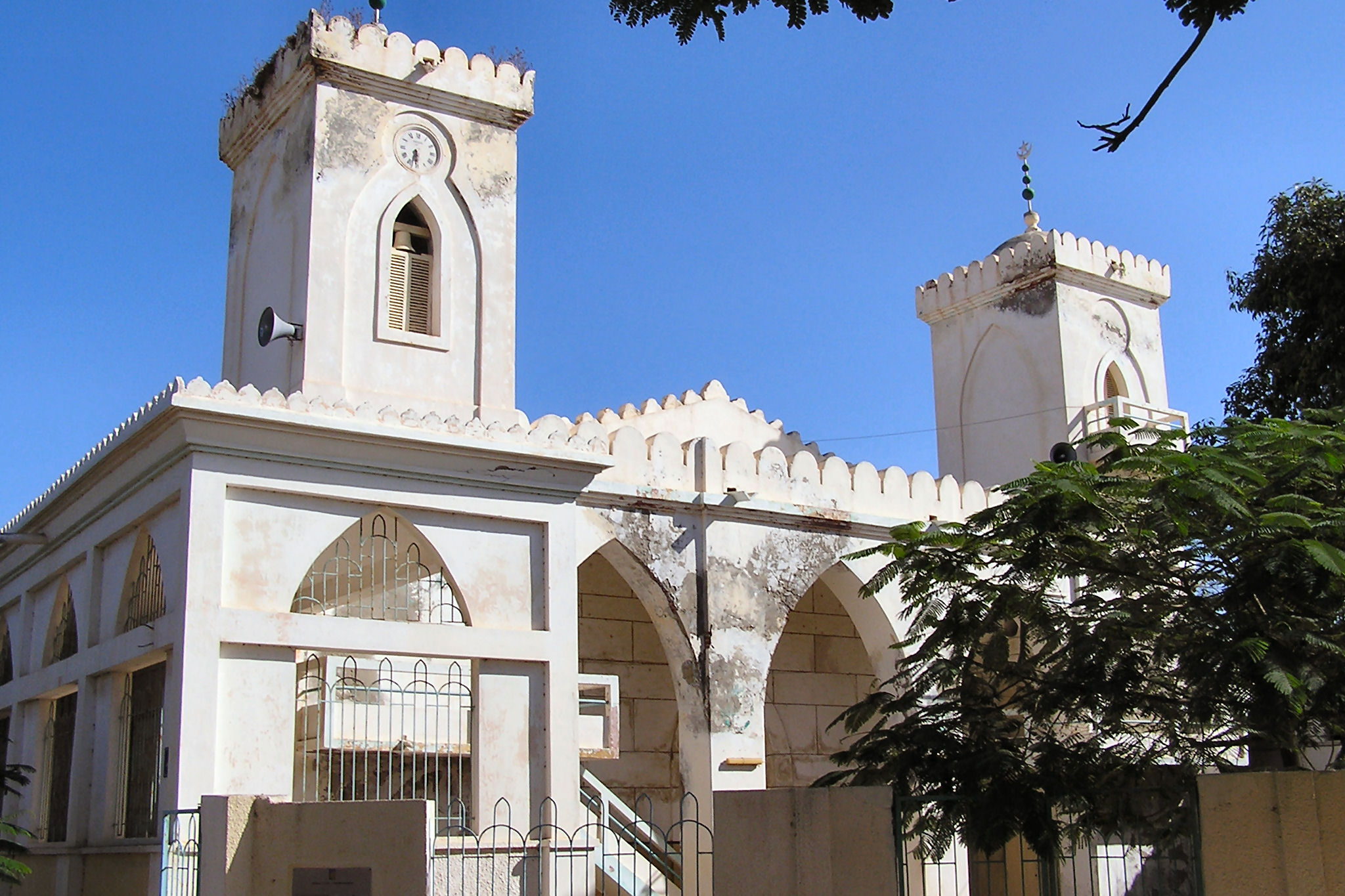
Grande Mosquée

The places of worship are predominantly Muslim mosques. There are also Christian churches and temples: Roman Catholic Diocese of Saint-Louis du Sénégal (Catholic Church), Assemblies of God, Universal Church of the Kingdom of God.

== Education ==
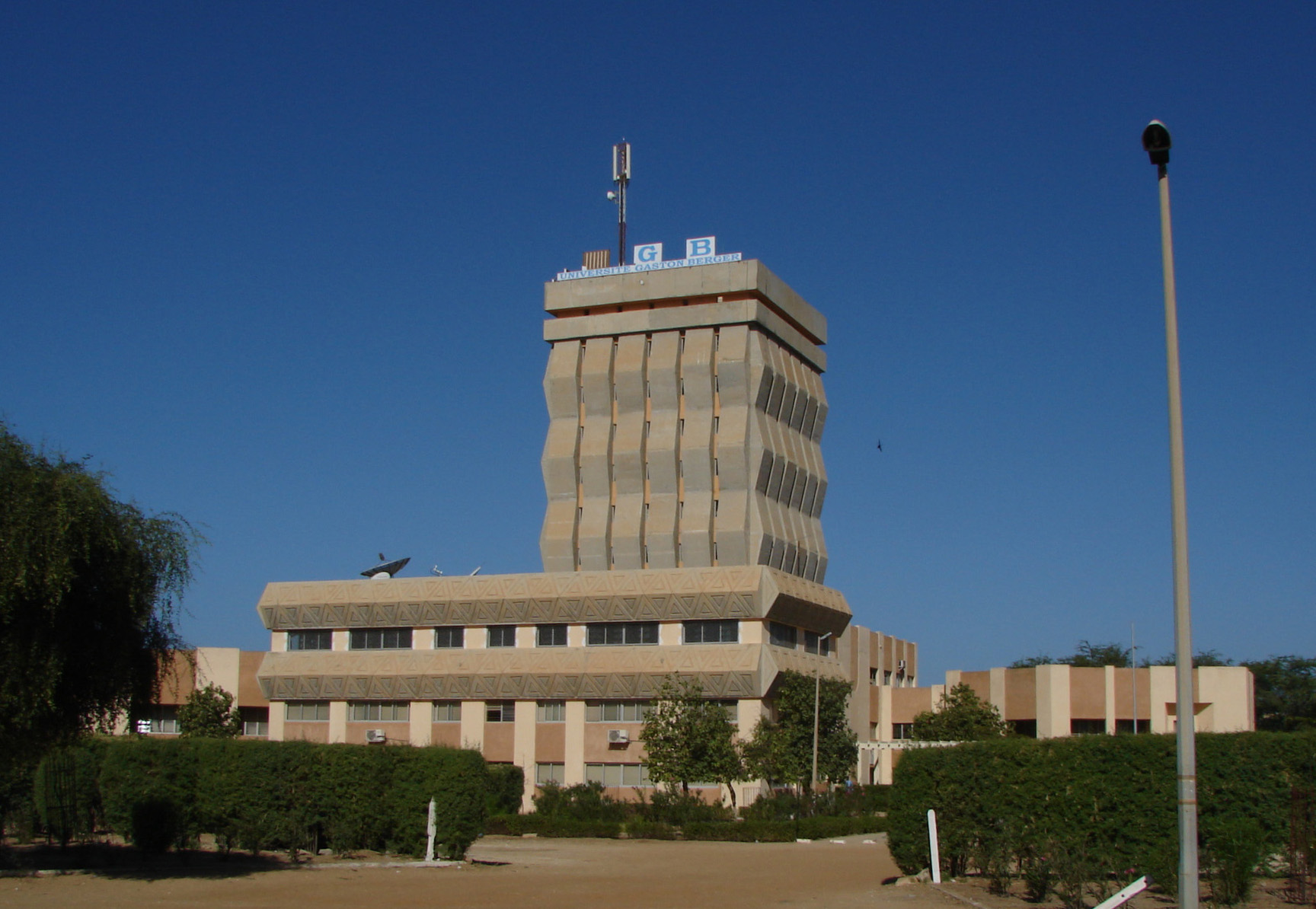
The main tower at Gaston Berger University, 2007.

With a large influence over education in colonial times, Saint Louis is now a center of educational excellence. It is home to the Gaston Berger University and The Military Academy Charles Ntchorere.

Gaston Berger University, created in 1990, offers studies organized in a number of general education and research faculties.

The Military Academy Charles Ntchorere, commonly known as the Prytanee Militaire of Saint Louis, was created in 1922.

The École française Antoine-de-Saint-Exupéry, a French international school serving preschool through collège (junior high school), is located in Saint-Louis.

== Notable inhabitants ==
Saint Louis has been the birthplace or home of:

- El Hadj Malick Sy
- Cheikh Ahmadou Bamba Mbacké
- Alfred-Amédée Dodds
- Jean-Baptiste Labat, Abbé David Boilat, Daniel Brattier, Catholic clergymen
- Michel Adanson, naturalist
- Louis Faidherbe
- Blaise Diagne, Lamine Guèye, politicians
- Mbarick Fall aka Battling Siki, boxer
- El Hadji Diouf, football player
- Bamba Fall, BK VEF Rīga center
- François-Edmond Fortier, French photographer
- Jean-Pierre Moussa, Catholic priest
- Badara Ndiaye (born 1986), Senegalese visual concept developer and fashion designer
- Marieme Faye Sall, former First Lady of Senegal
- Ismaïla Sarr, football player
- Abdoulaye Seye, sprinter & footballer

== Twin towns – sister cities ==
Saint-Louis is twinned with:

- Lille, France (1978)
- Fez, Morocco (1979)
- Liège, Belgium (1980)
- Bologna, Italy (1991)
- St. Louis, United States (1994)
