= Free black people in Jamaica =

Historical community in Jamaica

Free black people in Jamaica fell into two categories. Some secured their freedom officially, and lived within the slave communities of the Colony of Jamaica. Others ran away from slavery, and formed independent communities in the forested mountains of the interior. This latter group included the Jamaican Maroons, and subsequent fugitives from the sugar and coffee plantations of coastal Jamaica.

In 1838, all black people in Jamaica were emancipated, but in post-slavery Jamaica they continued to be excluded from the reins of power. A number of free black Jamaicans campaigned for political, social, educational and economic rights, until they succeeded in securing independence for the island in 1962.

== The Spanish Maroons ==
The earliest free black people were the Spanish Maroons, who fought the English colonial authorities intermittently in the latter half of the 17th century.

When the English captured Jamaica in 1655, the Spanish colonists fled, leaving a large number of African slaves. Former slaves organised under the leadership of Juan de Serras and Juan de Bolas, and they established themselves in modern-day Clarendon County, fighting on the side of the Spanish against the English. When de Bolas switched sides, and joined the English, the Spanish abandoned hope of recapturing Jamaica, accepting that de Bolas and his men were better equipped for fighting in the forested mountains of the interior than the Spanish.

Juan de Bolas and his Spanish Maroons then served as a "black militia" for the English. In 1664, de Bolas was killed in an ambush. Some historians believe that de Bolas was killed by Maroons from the group led by de Serras. Following the death of de Bolas, his group of Black Militia Maroons faded from history, while de Serras and his community continued to trouble the English authorities for years to come.

Juan de Serras' group of Jamaican Maroons established a distinct independent community, and they survived by subsistence farming and periodic raids of plantations. Over time, the Maroons came to control large areas of the Jamaican interior. In the second half of the 17th century, de Serras fought regular campaigns against the English colonial forces, even attacking the capital of Spanish Town, and he was never defeated by the English. In the early 18th century, Maroons frequently defeated the British in small-scale skirmishes. In response, the British colonial authorities dispatched the colonial militia to attack them, but the Maroons successfully fought a guerrilla campaign against them in the mountainous interior, and forced the colonial authorities to seek peace terms to end the expensive conflict.

In the mid-1660s, de Serras sent one of his Maroon warriors, Domingo, to discuss peace overtures. However, de Serras used the lull in the fighting to relocate to a more secure environment, probably the Blue Mountains in eastern Jamaica, from which they soon resumed attacks on the English colonial authorities.

In the 1670s, the former buccaneer Henry Morgan, who later became lieutenant-governor of Jamaica, and owner of a slave plantation in Guanaboa Vale, led a campaign against de Serras and the Karmahaly Maroons. Morgan was unable to rout the Maroons, but following that encounter the colonial authorities no longer filed reports about de Serras and the Karmahaly Maroons.

It is possible that de Serras and the Karmahaly Maroons withdrew further into the Blue Mountains, which were inaccessible to the English colonial authorities, where they lived off the land and avoided further contact with white planters. The runaway slaves from de Serras' group of Karmahaly Maroons may have formed the initial nucleus of the Windward Maroons. From early on, the Jamaican governors considered their settlements an impediment to English development of the interior. They ordered raids on the Maroon settlements in 1686 and 1702, to little effect.

== Free people of colour ==
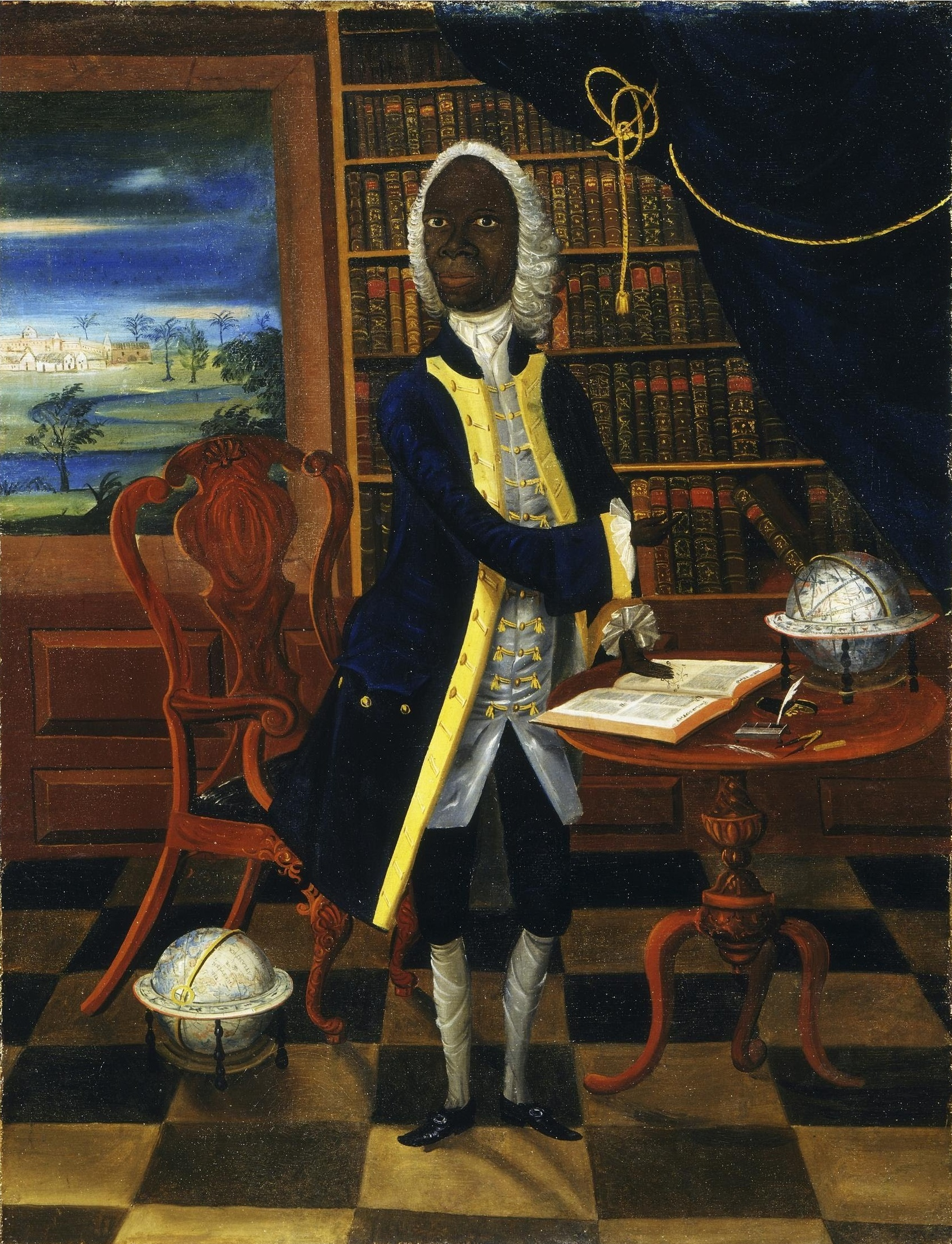
Portrait of Francis Williams, artist unknown, oil on canvas, circa 1745

One of the leading free people of colour in early Jamaica was Francis Williams, who was a scholar and poet born in Kingston, Jamaica, and who travelled to Europe and became a citizen of Britain. In the 1720s, he returned to Jamaica, where he set up a free school for black children.

The Williams family's status as free, property-owning black people set them apart from other Jamaican inhabitants, who were at the time mostly British colonists and enslaved Africans. Eventually, the Williams family property expanded to include both land and slaves. Though it was rare for black people in the 18th century to receive an education, Francis Williams and his siblings were able to afford schooling due to their father's wealth. Francis travelled to Europe, where he was reported to be in 1721.

In the 1720s, Williams returned to Jamaica, where he set up a free school for black children. In his school, Williams taught reading, writing, Latin and mathematics.

However, Williams encountered discrimination on his return to Jamaica. In 1724, a white planter named William Brodrick insulted Williams, calling him a "black dog", whereupon Williams reacted by calling Brodrick a "white dog" several times. Brodrick punched Williams, as a result of which his "mouth was bloody", but Williams retaliated, after which Brodrick's "shirt and neckcloth had been tore (sic) by the said Williams". Williams insisted that since he was a free black man, he could not be tried for assault, as would have been the case with black slaves who hit a white man, because he was defending himself.

The Assembly, which comprised elected white planters, was alarmed at the success with which Williams argued his case, and secured the dismissal of Brodrick's attempts to prosecute him. Complaining that "Williams's behaviour is of great encouragement to the negroes of the island in general", the Assembly then decided to "bring in a bill to reduce the said Francis Williams to the state of other free negroes in this island". This legislation made it illegal for any black person in Jamaica to strike a white person, even in self-defence.

== First Maroon War ==
Later Maroon groups were formed in the Blue Mountains in the eastern end of the island, and in the Cockpit Country in the west. They were known as the Windward Maroons and the Leeward Maroons respectively, and they conducted a decade-long war with the British colonial authorities throughout the 1730s, known as the First Maroon War. Cudjoe led the Leeward Maroons in the Cockpit Country in the western half of the island, and his lieutenant was Accompong. Cudjoe was the overall Maroon commander of the Maroon towns of Cudjoe's Town (Trelawny Town) and Accompong Town.

Quao and Queen Nanny were the leaders of the Windward Maroons in the Blue Mountains.

Disturbed by plantation raiding, the colonial authorities of Jamaica wanted to eradicate the Maroon communities in order to promote British settlement. Their strategy, beginning in the 1730s, was to break off lines of communication between the Windward and Leeward Maroons, then first pick off the less organized Windward Maroons. In practice, the Maroon troops' command of the territory and skill in guerrilla warfare gave them a strong advantage over colonial forces.

After much fighting, the British took and destroyed Nanny Town in 1734, but most of the Windward Maroons simply dispersed and formed new settlements. At this point, however, fighting shifted to Leeward, where the British troops had equally limited success against the well-trained and organized forces of Cudjoe.

Eventually, tired of war, these Maroons signed treaties with the British colonial authorities in 1739 and 1740. Cudjoe agreed to parley with John Guthrie. This local planter and militia officer was known to and respected by the Maroons.

== Maroon treaties ==
In 1739, the treaty signed under British governor Edward Trelawny granted Cudjoe's Maroons 1500 acres of land between their strongholds of Trelawny Town and Accompong in the Cockpit Country and a certain amount of political autonomy and economic freedoms, in return for which the Maroons were to provide military support in case of invasion or rebellion, and to return runaway slaves in exchange for a bounty of two dollars each. This last clause in the treaty caused tension between the Maroons and the enslaved black population.

In 1740, similar treaties were signed by Quao and Nanny, major leaders of the Windward Maroons. The Windward Maroons were originally located at Crawford's Town and the new Nanny Town (now called Moore Town). In all, about 600 Maroons came to terms with the British authorities through these two treaties.

In exchange, the colonial authorities asked the Maroons to agree not to harbour new runaway slaves, but rather to help catch them. This last clause in the treaty caused a split between the Maroons and the rest of the black population.

In addition, a British superintendent was to be assigned to live in each Maroon town.

== Aftermath of the First Maroon War ==
Not all the Maroons accepted the treaties. Rebellions occurred in Maroon communities in the years that followed. After the treaties, the white superintendents appointed by the governors eventually took control of the Maroon towns. In the 1740s, some Leeward Maroons who opposed the 1739 treaty rose in revolt, but Cudjoe crushed those rebellions.

In 1754, Quao attempted to overthrow Edward Crawford, the new Maroon leader of the Windward Maroon town, and in the resulting conflict, Crawford's Town was destroyed. Governor Charles Knowles re-established control over the uprising with the help of other Maroons. He then ordered that the Maroons of Crawford's Town be resettled in the new, nearby Windward Maroon towns of Charles Town and Scott's Hall.

== Tacky's Revolt ==
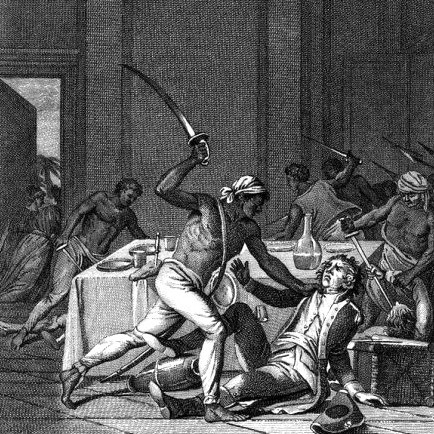
French illustration of the revolt, 1800

Tacky's War occurred in the Colony of Jamaica in the 1760s, and was led by a Fante royal and warlord called Tacky (Takyi) in eastern Jamaica, and Dahomean war chief or coastal headman Apongo in the western end of the island.

Tacky's War was the most significant slave rebellion in the Caribbean between the 1733 slave insurrection on St. John and the 1791 Haitian Revolution. According to Professor Trevor Burnard: "In terms of its shock to the imperial system, only the American Revolution surpassed Tacky's War in the 18th century." It was the most dangerous slave rebellion in the British Empire until the Baptist War of Samuel Sharpe in 1831–32, which also occurred in Jamaica.

The Windward Maroons engaged Tacky's men in a battle in Rocky Valley, and routed them, defeating and killing a number of the slave rebels. Tacky and the remainder of his men went running through the woods being chased by the Maroons and their legendary marksman, Davy the Maroon. The rest of Tacky's men were found in a cave near Tacky Falls, having committed suicide rather than going back to slavery.

The rebellion did not end there, as other rebellions broke out all over Jamaica. Other slaves learned of Tacky's revolt, which inspired unrest and disorder throughout the island. Rebels numbering about 1,200 regrouped in the unsettled mountainous forests in western Jamaica, under the leadership of a rebel slave christened Wager, but going by his African name of Apongo. They attacked eight slave plantations in Westmoreland Parish and two in Hanover Parish, killing a number of whites. Apongo's rebellion which began on 7 April 1760, and went on until October of the following year.

On July 3, the "King of the Rebels" Apongo was among those rebel slaves captured by the militia. The remaining rebels then fell under the leadership of an escaped slave named Simon, which took refuge in the Cockpit Country at a place called High Windward, from which they mounted a number of attacks on nearby plantations in Saint Elizabeth Parish.

Simon was reportedly killed in a skirmish, but there is no record of his runaway communities being routed. It is possible that they may have merged with other successful runaway communities in subsequent decades, and they may have served as an inspiration for other slave revolts.

Contemporary historian Robert Charles Dallas wrote that in the 1770s, a community of runaway slaves formed the Congo Settlement in the Cockpit Country, and resisted efforts by the Accompong Maroons to break them up until the end of the century. It is possible that the rebel slaves of Simon, and those from the 1766 Revolt, made up a significant part of that community. Many of the survivors of this community went on to fight on the side of Trelawny Town in the Second Maroon War.

== Ancoma and Three-Fingered Jack ==
Previous historians believed that the Maroons were able to successfully prevent runaway slaves from forming independent communities in the mountainous forests of the interior. However, recent research has shown that free black people in Jamaica were able to escape from bondage and through marronage were able to self-liberate themselves and form their own villages, which thrived for years, and sometimes decades. The leader of one of those unofficial maroon communities was an escaped slave named Ancoma. His community thrived in the forested interior of the eastern edge of the Blue Mountains in the eastern parish of what is now Saint Thomas Parish in the mid-1750s.

In 1759, two women killed Ancoma, and they received rewards from the Jamaican Assembly for their accomplishment. However, runaways continued to live in Ancoma's community for years after his death, and they continued to be a thorn in the side of Jamaican planter society.

In the late 1770s and early 1780s, Three-Fingered Jack formed a runaway maroon community in the same part of the parish of St Thomas-in-the-East, probably with some descendants of Ancoma's community. Jack Mansong was the leader of a band of runaway slaves that so troubled the colonial authorities that they offered a number of rewards for Jack, his deputies, and any of the maroons who fought on his side.

In 1781, Three-Fingered Jack was killed by a party of Maroons. Colonial records show that Jack was killed by a party of Maroons led by the white superintendent of Scott's Hall, Bernard Nalty, and included Maroon warriors from Charles Town, such as John Reeder, Samuel Grant and a young Maroon warrior named Little Quaco. These Maroons were already freedmen when they killed Jack.

Several of Jack's lieutenants were tried at the court in Yallahs, and sentenced to death. However, other deputies of Jack's continued to lead his runaway community in the years that followed his death. The Assembly offered rewards for the apprehension or killing of two of Jack's deputies, Dagger and Toney. In 1792, the colonial militia captured Dagger, and sentenced him to be resold into slavery in the Spanish colonies, but they were unable to catch Toney or the rest of Jack's community, which continued to live and thrive in the Blue Mountains.

== Second Maroon War ==
The Second Maroon War began in 1795 against the background of the British-Jamaican planters panicked by the excesses of the French Revolution, and by the corresponding start of a slave revolt in neighbouring Saint-Domingue, which ended with the independence of Haiti in 1804. At the same time, an increasing hunger for land among expanding Maroon communities in Jamaica coincided with several more immediate and proximate causes of grievance among the Maroons of Cudjoe's Town (Trelawny Town).

Governor Balcarres sent William Fitch to march on Trelawny Town with a military force to demand their immediate submission, ignoring the advice of local planters, who suggested giving the Maroons some more land in order to avoid conflict. Instead, the governor demanded that the Maroons surrender unconditionally, provoking a conflict that could have been avoided. The Trelawny Maroons, led by their colonel, Montague James, chose to fight and were initially successful, fighting a guerrilla war in small bands under several captains, of whom the most noted were Johnson, Parkinson, and Palmer.

The casualties suffered by Fitch and his men were significantly higher than those felt by the Maroons of Trelawny Town. When the Trelawny Town Maroons killed Fitch, several of his officers, some Accompong Maroon trackers, and many militia soldiers in an ambush, Balcarres appointed a new general, George Walpole. This new general suffered more setbacks, until he eventually opted to besiege the Cockpit Country on a massive scale, surrounding it with watchposts, firing in shells from a long distance, and intending to destroy or cut off all Maroon provision grounds.

Balcarres grew impatient and sent to Cuba for a hundred hunting dogs and handlers. The reputation of these was so fearsome that their arrival quickly prompted the surrender of the majority of Trelawny forces. The Maroons, however, only put down their arms on condition that they would not be deported, and Walpole gave his word that would be the case. To Walpole's dismay, Balcarres refused to treat with the defeated Maroons and had them deported from Jamaica, at first to Nova Scotia, then to the new British colony of Sierra Leone, and joined the African-American founders who established the Colony of Sierra Leone and the settlement of Freetown, Sierra Leone.

Maroon attempts to recruit plantation slaves resulted in large numbers of runaways gaining their freedom by fighting for Trelawny Town.

== Cuffee ==
In 1798, Cuffee escaped from a Jamaican plantation run by James McGhie, and he found refuge in the forested interior of the Cockpit Country. Many of the escaped slaves who joined his community had secured their freedom by fighting in the Second Maroon War.

The community was so large that they occupied several makeshift villages in the Cockpit Country, with their headquarters at a place called High Windward. Even though Cuffee was identified by Governor Alexander Lindsay, 6th Earl of Balcarres, as the headman, slave informers told the colonial authorities that Cuffee's maroon community had a revolving headman leadership structure.

Having secured muskets and ammunition from the Maroons of Cudjoe's Town (Trelawny Town), Cuffee and his men were well-armed and conducted a series of raids on plantations in western Jamaica. They destroyed estates such as Venture, Cox-heath pen, Pantre-Pant and Oxford. Many western planters claimed that their suffering at the hands of Cuffee's maroons was worse than what they endured under the Second Maroon War. Armed slaves sent out against them defected and joined Cuffee's community. Jamaican Maroons from Accompong Town tried to subdue Cuffee's community of runaways, but in vain.

Eventually, members of the slave "Black Shot" killed two of the revolving headmen, Prince and Hercules, and captured half a dozen runaway slaves. However, Cuffee then withdrew the majority of his community further into the Cockpit Country, and they were never subdued.

It is believed that members of Cuffee's community eventually joined the village of Me-no-Sen-You-no-Come, which was a refuge for runaway slaves in the Cockpit Country in the 19th century.

== Me-no-Sen-You-no-Come ==
In 1812, a community of runaways started when a dozen men and some women escaped from the sugar plantations of Trelawny into the Cockpit Country, and they created a village named Me-no-Sen-You-no-Come. It is located near some cliffs and boasted fertile soils in its valleys. The unofficial maroon community grew from its start of less than 20 runaway slaves to a large village that supported 14 buildings with shingle roofs and wood floors, raised poultry, hogs and nearly two hundred acres of cultivated land, thickly planted with provisions.

A large maroon group of runaway slaves established themselves near Hellshire Beach in southern Jamaica, and it thrived there for years until it was finally dispersed by a party of Windward Maroons in 1819.

By the 1820s, Me-no-Sen-You-no-Come housed between 50 and 60 runaways. The headmen of the community were escaped slaves named Warren and Forbes. Me-no-Sen-You-no-Come also conducted a thriving trade with slaves from the north coast, who exchanged their salt provisions with the runaways for their ground provisions.

In October 1824, the colonial militias tried to destroy this maroon community. Some historians believe that the Maroons of Accompong Town successfully crushed this runaway community.

However, recent research shows that these Maroons had limited success, because after they left Me-no-Sen-You-no-Come to return to Accompong Town, a number of the runaways returned to the village and rebuilt huts. The Accompong Maroons succeeded only in killing one man, and capturing two women and three children.

The community of Me-no-Sen-You-no-Come continued to thrive in the Cockpit Country until Emancipation in the 1830s. It is located in the southwest corner of the Cockpit Country.

== Doctresses ==
In the 18th century, Cubah Cornwallis, and other nurses in the West Indies during the period, treated patients with traditional home remedies, often mistaken for magic, religion or witchcraft. These "doctresses" used hygiene, a healthier diet than could have been expected on board ship, and a positive attitude.

A number of slaves secured their freedom through a variety of means, such as being mistresses or children of plantation whites. In 1780, one of these free people of colour, Cubah Cornwallis, became well-known when she nursed British naval hero Horatio Nelson, 1st Viscount Nelson, back to health in Port Royal when he took ill.

Another contemporary "doctress" of Cubah's was Sarah Adams, who also practised good hygiene and used herbal remedies throughout her long career. Adams also worked in Port Royal, and she died in 1849.

Other Jamaican doctresses of the 18th century included Mrs Grant, the mother of Mary Seacole, and Grace Donne, who nursed Jamaica's wealthiest planter, Simon Taylor. Cubah Cornwallis, Mrs Grant, Grace Donne and Sarah Adams used hygienic practices long before it became one of the main planks in the reforms of Florence Nightingale, in her book Notes on Nursing in 1859.

Mrs Grant, nicknamed "The Doctress", was a healer who used traditional Caribbean and African herbal medicines. Mrs Grant also ran Blundell Hall, a boarding house at 7 East Street, which was considered one of the best hotels in all of Kingston.

== Free people of colour secure voting rights ==
Campaigners such as Edward Jordon, Robert Osborn and Richard Hill were successful in securing equal rights for free people of colour in the early 1800s.

In 1823, the free people of colour of Jamaica presented a petition to the Jamaican Assembly asking for restrictions placed upon them to be lifted, and that free people of colour be allowed to testify in a court of law. However, the Assembly rejected the petition, and continued to deny free people of colour equal rights. The Jamaican colonial government deported the leaders of the free coloureds, Louis Celeste Lecesne and John Escoffery, in an attempt to destroy the movement.

In 1827, a petition was presented by another free coloured leader, Richard Hill, to the House of Commons. In 1830, when Jordon and his colleagues presented another petition to the Jamaican Assembly, enough pressure was brought to bear to grant free people of colour the rights to vote and to run for public office.

Some free people of colour played a significant role in the anti-slavery movement. In 1828, Jordon and Osborn launched their own newspaper, The Watchman. Unlike other newspapers, which expressed the views of white planters, The Watchman presented issues of importance to the Jamaican free people of colour, and it forged ties with the humanitarian movement and the Anti-Slavery Society in England.

== Sam Sharpe and the Baptist War ==
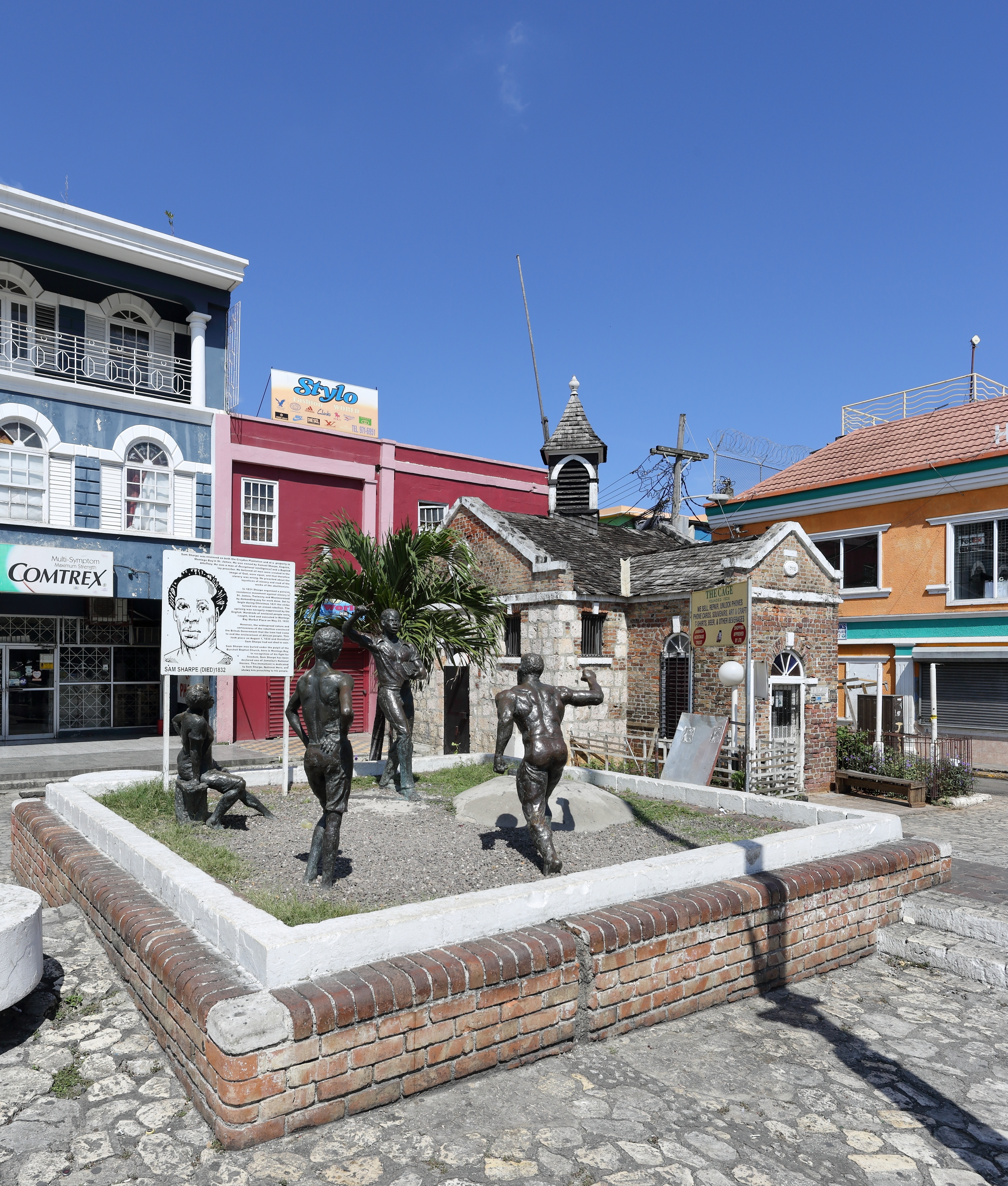
Sam Sharpe Memorial, Montego Bay

The Baptist War, also known as the Sam Sharpe Rebellion, of 1831–32, was an eleven-day rebellion that started on 25 December 1831 and involved up to 60,000 of the 300,000 slaves in Jamaica. The uprising was led by a black Baptist deacon, Samuel Sharpe and waged largely by his followers.

The rebellion was quickly suppressed by the colonial authorities. The reaction of the colonial government and reprisals of the plantocracy were far more brutal than any actions undertaken by the rebels; approximately 500 slaves were killed, with 207 killed outright during the revolt. After the rebellion, an estimated 310 to 340 slaves were killed through "various forms of judicial executions". At times, slaves were executed for quite minor offenses (one recorded execution was for the theft of a pig; another, a cow).

As a result of the Baptist War, hundreds of slaves ran away into the Cockpit Country in order to avoid being forced back into slavery. The Maroons were only successful in apprehending a small number of these runaway slaves. Many runaways remained free and at large when the British parliament passed the Act abolishing slavery in 1833.

== Emancipation ==
Because of the loss of property and life in the 1831 Baptist War rebellion, the British Parliament held two inquiries. Their reports on conditions contributed greatly to the abolition movement and passage of the 1833 law to abolish slavery as of 1 August 1834, throughout the British Empire.

The Jamaican slaves were bound (indentured) to their former owners' service, albeit with a guarantee of rights, until 1838 under what was called the Apprenticeship System. This Apprenticeship was originally scheduled to run until 1840, but the numerous abuses committed by white plantation owners on their black apprentices led to the British government terminating it two years ahead of schedule, and the ex-slaves were finally awarded full freedom. The planters often found themselves in conflict with Richard Hill, the mixed-race Head of the Department of the Stipendiary Magistrates, over their mistreatment of the apprentices.

At the end of the 18th century and in the early years of the 19th century, the Crown began to allow some Jamaicans — mostly local merchants, urban professionals, and artisans — into the appointed councils. Edward Jordon and Richard Hill became leading figures in post-emancipation Jamaica. In 1835, Hill was appointed Head of the Department of Stipendiary Magistrates, a position he held for many years.

== Post-Emancipation Jamaica ==
The Right Excellent George William Gordon
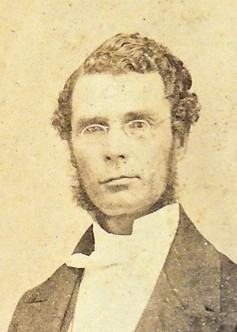
- George William Gordon
- Born: 1820
- Died: Executed, 23 October 1865 (aged 44–45); Morant Bay, Jamaica

The period after emancipation in the 1830s initially was marked by a conflict between the plantocracy and elements in the Colonial Office over the extent to which individual freedom should be coupled with political participation for blacks. In 1840 the Assembly changed the voting qualifications in a way that enabled a significant number of blacks and people of mixed race (browns or mulattos) to vote, but placed property ownership restrictions on them, which excluded the majority of non-white men from voting.

The requirements were an income of £180 a year, or real property worth £1,800, or both real and personal property worth £3,000. These figures excluded the vast majority of freed black Jamaicans from the right to vote in Assembly elections. Consequently, neither Emancipation nor the change in voting qualifications resulted in a change in the political system. The chief interests of the planter class lay in the continued profitability of their estates, and they continued to dominate the elitist Assembly.

In 1835, Jordon was elected a member of the Assembly for Kingston, and he led the Kings House Party, or Coloured Party, that opposed the Planters Party. In 1852, Jordon became mayor Kingston, a post he held for 14 years, and he was speaker for the Assembly in the early 1860s.

George William Gordon (1815 – 23 October 1865) was a wealthy mixed-race Jamaican businessman, magistrate and politician, one of two representatives to the Assembly from St. Thomas-in-the-East parish. He was a leading critic of the colonial government and the policies of Jamaican Governor Edward John Eyre.

However, in the wake of the Morant Bay rebellion, Governor Eyre, with the support of the Colonial Office, persuaded the Assembly to renounce its charter, thus ending two centuries of elected representation in the Colony of Jamaica. White planters were appointed by the governor. This move deprived the black majority of a voice in the colony's government, and it was condemned by Jordon and Osborn. Jamaica became a Crown Colony, under direct rule from London.

== Morant Bay Rebellion ==
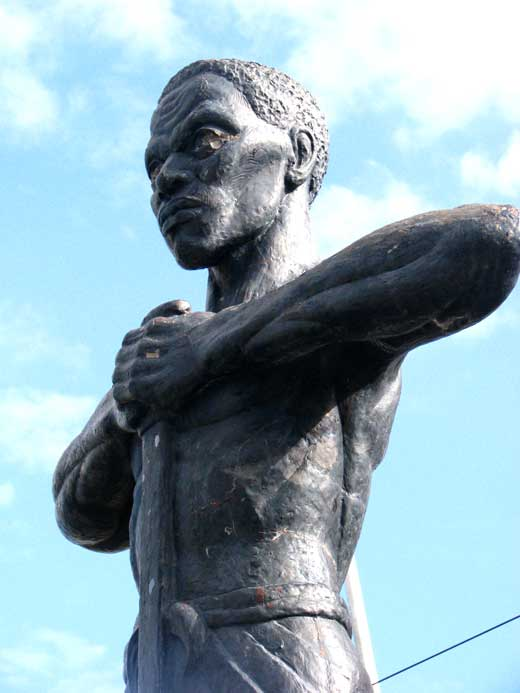
"Artistic Impression of Paul Bogle" in Morant Bay, Jamaica

On 11 October 1865, the Morant Bay Rebellion began with a protest march to the courthouse by hundreds of free black people led by preacher Paul Bogle in Morant Bay, Jamaica. Some were armed with sticks and stones. After seven men were shot and killed by the volunteer militia, the protesters attacked and burned the courthouse and nearby buildings. A total of 25 people died. Over the next two days, poor freedmen, many ex-slaves, rose in rebellion across most of St. Thomas-in-the-East parish.

The Jamaicans were protesting injustice and widespread poverty. Most freedmen were prevented from voting by high poll taxes, and their living conditions had worsened following crop damage by floods, cholera and smallpox epidemics, and a long drought. A few days before the march, when police tried to arrest a man for disrupting a trial, a fight broke out against them by spectators. Officials then issued a warrant for the arrest of preacher Bogle, who had called for reforms, and was charged with inciting to riot.

Governor Eyre declared martial law in the area, ordering in troops to hunt down the rebels. They killed many innocent black individuals, including women and children, with an initial death toll of more than 400. Troops arrested more than 300 persons, including Bogle. Many of these were also innocent but were quickly tried and executed under martial law; both men and women were punished by whipping and long sentences. This was the most severe suppression of unrest in the history of the British West Indies. The governor had George William Gordon, a mixed-race representative of the parish in the House of Assembly, arrested in Kingston and brought back to Morant Bay, where he tried the politician under martial law. Gordon was quickly convicted and executed.

The violent suppression and numerous executions generated a fierce debate in England, with some protesting about the unconstitutional actions of the governor John Eyre, and others praising him for his response to a crisis. The rebellion and its suppression remain controversial, and it is frequently debated by specialists in black and colonial studies.

== Pan-African Movement ==
Dr. Robert Love
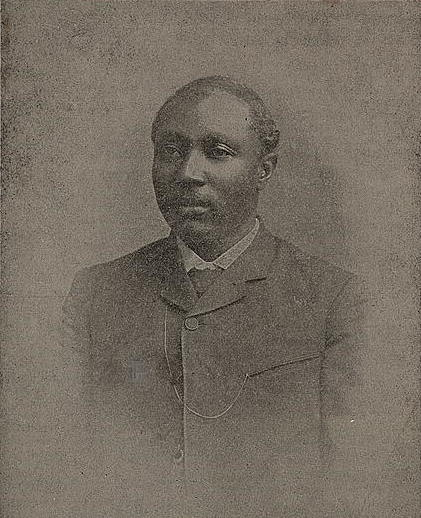

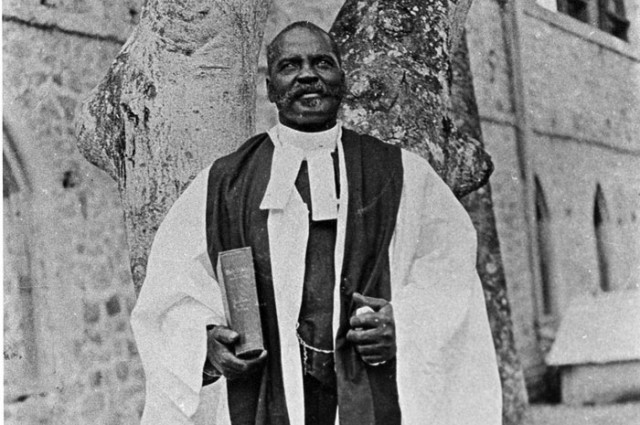
Alexander Bedward

Joseph Robert Love was a 19th-century Bahamian-born medical doctor, clergyman, teacher, journalist, politician and Pan-Africanist. He lived, studied, and worked successively in the Bahamas, the United States of America, Haiti, and Jamaica. Love spent the last decades of his life in Jamaica, where he held political office, published a newspaper, and advocated for the island's black majority.

In Jamaica, he started the Jamaica Advocate newspaper in December 1894, which became an influential newspaper on the island. Love used the paper as a forum to express his concern for the living conditions of Jamaica's black population. He was a staunch advocate of access to education for the majority of the population. He believed that girls, like boys, should receive secondary school education.

Love piloted a voter registration drive, as a means of empowering the black majority, and challenging white minority rule. John Vassall stated: “Dr. Love must remember that his ancestors were my ancestors’ slaves....He could never be my equal. He is aggrieved because my forefathers rescued him from the bonds of thraldom and deprived him the privilege of being King of the Congo, enjoying the epicurean and conjugal orgies and the sacrificial pleasures of his ancestral home in Africa.”

The white establishment viewed Love with as much suspicion as they did the pan-African Native Baptist preacher, Alexander Bedward.

Many Afro-Jamaican Christian churches sprung up in the aftermath of Emancipation. In 1889, Bedward became the leader of one of them, the Jamaica Native Baptist Free Church. He ministered to his flock by Hope River, and his congregation grew large and thrived. He warned that the government of the Colony of Jamaica was passing laws to oppress black people, and was robbing them of their money and their bread.

In 1895, Bedward was arrested for sedition but sent to a mental asylum. Critics within the government succeeded in having Bedward sectioned in a mental asylum, but with the help of a sympathetic lawyer, Bedward secured his freedom. On release he continued his role as a Revival healer and preacher. He stressed his followers to be self-sufficient and at its height the movement gathered about 30,000 followers. He told his followers to sell their possessions including owned land and give him all the profits. Some of these followers did just that.

== Marcus Garvey ==
In 1914, Marcus Garvey was the founder and first President-General of the Universal Negro Improvement Association and African Communities League (UNIA-ACL, commonly known as UNIA), through which he declared himself Provisional President of Africa. Ideologically a black nationalist and Pan-Africanist, his ideas came to be known as Garveyism.

Garvey campaigned for an end to European colonial rule across Africa and the political unification of the continent. He envisioned a unified Africa as a one-party state, governed by himself, that would enact laws to ensure black racial purity. Although he never visited the continent, he was committed to the Back-to-Africa movement, arguing that some people of African descent should migrate there. Garveyist ideas became increasingly popular and UNIA grew in membership.

Committed to the belief that black people needed to secure financial independence from white-dominant society, Garvey launched various businesses in the U.S., including the Negro Factories Corporation and Negro World newspaper. In 1919, he became President of the Black Star Line shipping and passenger company, designed to forge a link between North America and Africa and facilitate African-American migration to Liberia. In 1923 Garvey was convicted of mail fraud for selling the company's stock and imprisoned in the United States Penitentiary, for nearly two years.

Deported to Jamaica in 1927, where he settled in Kingston with his wife Amy Jacques, Garvey continued his activism and established the People's Political Party in 1929, briefly serving as a city councillor. With UNIA in increasing financial difficulty, in 1935 he relocated to London, where his anti-socialist stance distanced him from many of the city's black activists. He died there in 1940, although in 1964 his body was returned to Jamaica for reburial in Kingston's National Heroes Park.

== Free Black scientists, writers and artists ==
Thomas Phillip Lecky, known as T.P. Lecky (1904–1994), was a Jamaican scientist who developed several new breeds of cattle. The research of Thomas Lecky in cattle breeding led to the development of three breeds suited the tropical climate: Jamaica Hope, Jamaica Red, and Jamaica Black. Jamaica Hope was the first breed of cattle indigenous to Jamaica.

Thomas MacDermot (26 June 1870 – 8 October 1933) was a Jamaican poet, novelist, and editor, editing the Jamaica Times for more than 20 years. He was "probably the first Jamaican writer to assert the claim of the West Indies to a distinctive place within English-speaking culture". He also published under the pseudonym Tom Redcam (derived from his surname spelled in reverse). He was Jamaica's first Poet Laureate.

Festus Claudius McKay (September 15, 1890 – May 22, 1948) was a Jamaican-American writer and poet, and a central figure in the Harlem Renaissance.

Born in Jamaica, Claude McKay moved to New York City in 1914 and in 1919 wrote "If We Must Die", one of his best known works, a widely reprinted sonnet responding to the wave of white-on-black race riots and lynchings following the conclusion of the First World War. A poet from the first, he also wrote five novels and a novella: Home to Harlem (1928), a best-seller that won the Harmon Gold Award for Literature; Banjo (1929); Banana Bottom (1933); Romance in Marseille (written in 1933, published in 2020), a novella, Harlem Glory (written in 1938–1940, published in 1990), and in 1941 a novel, Amiable With Big Teeth: A Novel of the Love Affair Between the Communists and the Poor Black Sheep of Harlem, which remained unpublished until 2017.

Besides these novels and four published collections of poetry, McKay also authored a collection of short stories, Gingertown (1932); two autobiographical books, A Long Way from Home (1937) and My Green Hills of Jamaica (published posthumously in 1979); and Harlem: Negro Metropolis (1940), consisting of eleven essays on the contemporary social and political history of Harlem and Manhattan, concerned especially with political, social and labour organizing. His 1922 poetry collection, Harlem Shadows, was among the first books published during the Harlem Renaissance and his novel Home To Harlem was a watershed contribution to its fiction. His Selected Poems was published posthumously, in 1953. His Complete Poems (2004) includes almost ninety pages of poetry written between 1923 and the late 1940s, most of it previously unpublished, a crucial addition to his poetic oeuvre.

Roger Mais (11 August 1905 – 21 June 1955) was a Jamaican journalist, novelist, poet, and playwright. He was born to a middle-class family in Kingston. By 1951, he had won 10 first prizes in West Indian literary competitions. His integral role in the development of political and cultural nationalism was recognised with the awarding of the Order of Jamaica in 1978.

Andrew Salkey (30 January 1928 – 28 April 1995) was a Jamaican novelist, poet, children's books writer and journalist of Jamaican and Panamanian origin. He was born in Panama but raised in Jamaica, moving to Britain in the 1950s to pursue university education. A prolific writer and editor, he was the author of more than 30 books in the course of his career, including novels for adults and for children, poetry collections, anthologies, travelogues and essays. He died in Amherst, Massachusetts, where he had been teaching since the 1970s, holding a lifetime position as Writer-In-Residence at Hampshire College.

Edna Swithenbank Manley, OM (28 February 1900 – 2 February 1987) is considered one of the most important artists and arts educators in Jamaica. She was known primarily as a sculptor although her oeuvre included significant drawings and paintings. Her work forms an important part of the National Gallery of Jamaica's permanent collection and can be viewed in other public institutions in Jamaica such as Bustamante Children's Hospital, the University of the West Indies, and the Kingston Parish Church.

Her early training was in the British neoclassical tradition. In the early 1920s and 1930s she experimented with modernism eventually adapting it to her own aesthetic.

Edna Manley was an early supporter of art education in Jamaica. In the 1940s, she organised and taught art classes at the Junior Centre of the Institute of Jamaica. These classes developed in a more formal setting with the establishment of the Jamaica School of Art and Craft in 1950. Jamaica's first Art School would eventually expand into a college and was renamed Edna Manley College of the Visual and Performing Arts in 1995 to honour the artist's pioneering role in Jamaican Art.

Edna Manley was also the wife of Norman Manley, the founder of the Jamaican People's National Party and the first Premier of Jamaica. She is often considered the "mother of Jamaican art".

Noel Tancred Escofil (8 November 1913- 31 Mar 1989) was born in Kingston, Jamaica, and later immigrated to the United States. He created an Anglo-Hispanic Alphabet, Copyrighted 1969 via Library of Congress, as well as spending time as a conscientious objector in Big Flats camp in New York, in the 1940s. He was noted as "not being the easiest man in the world to manage." He also unsuccessfully argued in a landmark Supreme Court Case that he shouldn't have to pay Social Security Income taxes, quoting bible verse Matthew 6:34- "Take therefore no thought for the morrow: for the morrow shall take thought for the things of itself. Sufficient unto the day is the evil thereof.".

== Alexander Bustamante and Norman Manley ==
Alexander Bustamante became a leader in activism against colonial rule. He gained recognition by writing frequent letters on the issues to the Daily Gleaner newspaper. In 1937 he was elected as treasurer of the Jamaica Workers' Union (JWU), which had been founded by labour activist Allan G. S. Coombs. During the 1938 labour rebellion, he quickly became identified as the spokesman for striking workers, who were mostly of African and mixed-race descent. Coombs' JWU became the Bustamante Industrial Trade Union (BITU) after the revolt, and Bustamante became known as "The Chief".

In 1940, he was imprisoned on charges of subversive activities. The widespread anti-colonial activism finally resulted in Parliament's granting universal suffrage in 1944 to residents in Jamaica. He was defended by N.W. Manley and released from prison in 1943, Bustamante founded the Jamaica Labour Party the same year. Previously he had belonged to the People's National Party (founded in 1938 by his first cousin Norman Manley).

Norman Washington Manley MM QC ONH (4 July 1893 – 2 September 1969) was a Jamaican statesman who served as the first Premier of Jamaica. A Rhodes Scholar, Manley became one of Jamaica's leading lawyers in the 1920s. Manley was an advocate of universal suffrage, which was granted by the British colonial government to the colony in 1944.

In the 1944 Jamaican general election, Bustamante's party won 22 of 32 seats in the first House of Representatives elected by universal suffrage. He became the unofficial government leader, representing his party as Minister for Communications. Under the new charter, the British governor, assisted by the six-member Privy Council and ten-member Executive Council, remained responsible solely to the Crown. The Jamaican Legislative Council became the upper house, or Senate, of the bicameral Parliament. House members were elected by adult suffrage from single-member electoral districts called constituencies. Despite these changes, ultimate power remained concentrated in the hands of the governor and other high officials.

Encouraged by Osmond Theodore Fairclough, who had joined forces with the brothers Frank and Ken Hill, Hedley P. Jacobs and others in 1938, Manley helped to launch the People's National Party which later was tied to the Trade Union Congress and even later the National Workers Union. He led the PNP in every election from 1944 to 1967. Their efforts resulted in the New Constitution of 1944, granting full adult suffrage.

In the 1955 Jamaican general election, the PNP won for the first time, securing 18 out of 32 seats. The JLP ended up with 14 seats, and there were no independents. The voter turnout with 65.1%. As a result, Norman Manley became the new chief minister.

Manley served as the colony's Chief Minister from 1955 to 1959, and as Premier from 1959 to 1962. He was a proponent of self-government but was persuaded to join nine other British colonies in the Caribbean territories in a Federation of the West Indies but called a referendum on the issue in 1961. Voters chose to have Jamaica withdraw from the union. He then opted to call a general election even though his five-year mandate was barely halfway through.

On 10 April 1962, of the 45 seats up for contention in the 1962 Jamaican general election, the JLP won 26 seats and the PNP 19. The voter turnout was 72.9%.

This resulted in the independence of Jamaica on 6 August 1962, and several other British colonies in the West Indies followed suit in the next decade. Bustamante had replaced Manley as premier between April and August, and on independence, he became Jamaica's first prime minister.
