= Jamaican Maroons in Sierra Leone =

Repatriated Africans from Cudjoe's Town (Trelawny Town), in Jamaica

The Jamaican Maroons in Sierra Leone were a group of just under 600 Jamaican Maroons from Cudjoe's Town, the largest of the five Jamaican maroon towns who were deported by the British authorities in Jamaica following the Second Maroon War in 1796, first to Nova Scotia. Four years later in 1800, they were transported to Sierra Leone.

The Sierra Leone Company had established the settlement of Freetown and the Colony of Sierra Leone in 1792 for the resettlement of the African Americans who arrived via Nova Scotia after they had been evacuated as freedmen from the United States after the American Revolutionary War. Some Jamaican Maroons eventually returned to Jamaica, but most became part of the larger Sierra Leone Creole people and culture made up of freemen and liberated slaves who joined them in the first half-century of the colony. For a long period, they dominated the government and the economy of what developed into Sierra Leone.

== History ==
=== Nova Scotia ===
In the Colony of Jamaica, during the course of the Second Maroon War of 1795-6, the Maroons of Cudjoe's Town (Trelawny Town) had the better of the skirmishes. They only laid down their arms and surrendered in December 1795 on condition they would not be deported. General George Walpole gave the Maroons his word that they would not be transported off the island.

The Jamaican governor, Alexander Lindsay, 6th Earl of Balcarres, used the contrived breach of treaty as a pretext to deport most of the Trelawny Town Maroons to Nova Scotia. Walpole was disgusted with the governor's actions, pointing out that he had given the Maroons his word that they would not be transported off the island. Walpole resigned his commission, and went back to England, where he became an MP and protested in the House of Commons how Balcarres had behaved in a duplicitous and dishonest way with the Maroons.

In 1796, just under 600 Jamaican Maroons from Trelawny Town were deported to Nova Scotia, where loyal colonial slaves who had sought refuge behind English lines had also been sent earlier in the decade. Immediate actions were put in place for the removal of the Trelawny Maroons to Lower Canada (Quebec); Upper Canada (Ontario) had also been suggested as a suitable place. The British decided to send this group to Halifax, Nova Scotia, until further instructions were received from England. William Quarrell and Alexander Ochterlony were sent from Jamaica with the maroons as commissioners. During the course of his administration, Ochterlony took half a dozen maroon women as mistresses. Quarrell tried in vain to break up the maroons as a community.

On 26 June 1796, the ships Dover, Mary, and Anne sailed from Port Royal, to Halifax. One arrived in Halifax on 21 July, the other two followed two days later, carrying, according to one historian, a total of 568 men, women, and children. According to another historian, about 581 Maroons from Trelawny Town left Jamaica, and 17 died on the voyage. Prince Edward, the Commander-in-Chief, North America, impressed with the proud bearing and other characteristics of the maroons, employed the group to work on the new fortifications at the Citadel Hill in Halifax. Lieutenant-Governor Sir John Wentworth believed that the maroons would be good settlers. He received orders from the Duke of Portland to settle them in Nova Scotia.

Following this the two commissioners responsible with credit of 25,000 Jamaican pounds from the government of Jamaica, expended £3,000 on 5,000 acres (20 km^{2}) of land and built the community of Preston, Nova Scotia. Governor Wentworth was granted an allowance of £240 annually from England to provide religious instruction and schooling for the community. After the first winter, the maroons, raised in an independent culture and warmer climate, and not impressed with what they considered the servile aspects of subsistence agriculture, became less tolerant of the conditions in which they were living. The colonel of the Trelawny Town Maroons, Montague James, wrote a number of petitions to England and Jamaica asking for them to be removed from Nova Scotia. The maroon colonel sent one of his junior officers, Charles Samuels (maroon), to London to present information to Whig MP George Walpole about the terrible conditions they had to endure in Nova Scotia.

=== Arrival in Sierra Leone ===
The Sierra Leone Company decided to send the maroons to its new colony of Freetown in present-day Sierra Leone (West Africa), which had been established for the Nova Scotian Settlers. The Maroon survivors from Nova Scotia were transported to Freetown in 1800, in the early years of the colony.

The final leg of their journey was aboard HMS Asia. She arrived at Halifax on 31 May 1800, presumably still under her captain from 1796, Robert Murray, to pick up the maroons, sailed again with them on 8 August, and arrived in Sierra Leone on 30 September that year. The maroons helped the British to put down a rebellion by the Black Nova Scotians, after which they received the best land and houses.

In the first two months at Sierra Leone, 22 maroons died, mainly from disease, and over 150 took ill.

=== Maroons in Sierra Leone ===
At Trelawny Town, and throughout their exile to first Nova Scotia and then Sierra Leone, Montague James continued to command the Trelawny Maroons. In 1809, Sierra Leone Governor Thomas Perronet Thompson officially nominated Montague James as the head of the maroons in Sierra Leone. Montague James died three years later.

Once they became settled, and they started to flourish, their numbers grew to the point that they numbered in the mid-600s in 1826. They gained good jobs in the civil service and the military.

However, the situation soured for the Maroons in the 1830s, when they objected to the use of corporal punishment in the military, and a new governor dismissed many Maroons from civil service jobs and gave them to Nova Scotians and Liberated Africans. Many Maroons were traders, but they could not compete with the Liberated Africans who came to the colony in large numbers, and took over the internal trade. European visitors observed that the Maroons were disliked by the other ethnic groups in the colony.

With the passing years, more Maroons requested a return to Jamaica. After the Second Maroon War, the Jamaican Assembly had passed a law making it a felony punishable by death for any Trelawny Maroon to return to Jamaica. Two petitions sent by the Maroons in Sierra Leone to the British Crown requesting the right to return were rejected.

However, in 1831, another petition was presented by 224 Sierra Leone Maroons to the British government, and this time the Jamaican authorities relented. They responded by saying they would place no obstacle in the way of Maroons returning to Jamaica, but would not pay any passage or the purchase of lands in the island.

The final tipping point occurred in 1839, when a Liberated African apprentice, an Ibo named Martin, murdered his elderly Maroon employer, Major John Jarrett. A group of Maroons caught Martin, and they tortured him, and then burnt him to death to avenge Major Jarrett. The Ibo in the colony demanded vengeance, and attacked Maroons in Freetown, forcing a number of them to flee for safety in the interior. After this incident, large numbers of Maroons no longer felt safe in Sierra Leone.

=== Maroons Returning to Jamaica ===
In 1839, the first Maroons made their way from Sierra Leone to Jamaica. Mary Brown and her family, which included her daughter Sarah McGale and a Spanish son-in-law, sold off their property in Sierra Leone, bought a schooner, and set sail for Jamaica. They were joined by two other Sierra Leone Maroons, Mary Ricketts and her daughter Jane Bryan. In 1841, this group found their way to Trelawny Town, now called Maroon Town, but which they still insisted on calling Cudjoe's Town.

In 1841, some of the maroons returned to Jamaica to work for Jamaican sugar planters, who desperately needed workers following the abolition of slavery. Many freedmen in Jamaica wanted to cultivate their own plots rather than work on plantations, leaving a vacuum for workers, and the Jamaican planters initially turned to Sierra Leone.

In 1841, the first ship to arrive in Sierra Leone looking for African workers was the Hector, and several Maroons were so desperate to leave Sierra Leone that they did not wait for the ship to dock, but rowed out to meet it in their canoes. In all, 64 Maroons left Sierra Leone for Jamaica on the Hector alone. Most Sierra Leone Maroons lived in Freetown, and between 1837 and 1844, Freetown's Maroon population shrank from 650 to 454, suggesting that about 200 made their way back to Jamaica.

As many as one-third of the Maroons in Sierra Leone returned to Jamaica in the 1840s.

=== Maroons remaining in Sierra Leone ===
The Jamaican Maroons who remained in Sierra Leone gradually merged with the developing Sierra Leone Creole people. This was made up of immigrants and the descendants of various groups of freed slaves who arrived in Freetown between 1792 and about 1855. After abolishing the Atlantic slave trade, the British Navy posted ships off Africa to intercept slavers, and would deposit liberated slaves at Freetown. Some modern Creoles (or "Krio") still proudly claim descent from the maroons.

The Creole congregation of Freetown's St. John's Maroon Church, which was built by the maroons in 1822 on what is now the city's main street, have especially emphasized their descent from the Jamaican exiles. The maroons brought their ceremonial music and dances to Sierra Leone. The ceremonial music gradually became a popular Creole music genre and became known as Gumbe music and dance (named after the drum). It has survived into the 21st century and influences popular music. It has become identified with the broader Creole population.

== Notable Jamaican Maroons and their Creole descendants ==
=== Jamaican Maroon Settlers in Sierra Leone ===
- Andrew Smith
- Major Jarrett
- Montague James
- Charles Samuels

=== Creole descendants of the Jamaican Maroons ===
- Sir Ernest Dunstan Morgan
- Robert Smith
- Francis Smith
- Adelaide Casely-Hayford
- Gladys Casely-Hayford
- Eldred Durosimi Jones
- Arthur Thomas Porter
- Constance Cummings-John
- Thomas Frederick Hope
- Yvonne Aki-Sawyerr
- Daddy Saj
- Frances Claudia Wright
- Albert Jarrett
- Ulric Jones
- Robert Wellesley Cole

== See also ==
- Nova Scotians in Sierra Leone
