= Andrew Smith (Maroon) =

Maroon officer

Andrew Smith (died c. early 1800s) was a Maroon officer from Cudjoe's Town (Trelawny Town). His brother, Charles Samuels, was also an officer from Trelawny Town, and both officers reported to Colonel Montague James.

== Second Maroon War ==
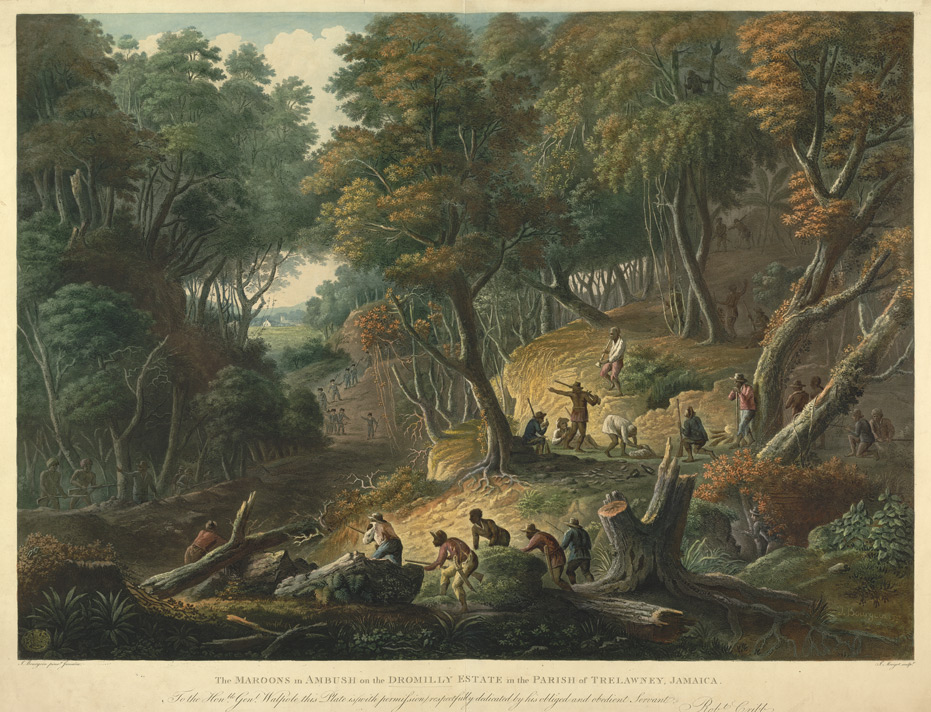
1801 aquatint of a maroon raid on the Dromilly estate, Jamaica, during the Second Maroon War of 1795–6.

As the population of the Jamaican Maroon village of Trelawny Town grew in the second half of the eighteenth century, Andrew Smith set up a satellite village of his own in the rural Westmoreland Parish.

When the Second Maroon War broke out between Trelawny Town and the colonial authorities, the militias destroyed Smith's village. As a result, Smith joined the Trelawny Maroons as they fought against the forces of Governor Alexander Lindsay, 6th Earl of Balcarres. When General George Walpole eventually persuaded the Trelawny Maroons to lay down their arms on a promise that they would not be deported, Smith was one of the first to surrender. However, Balcarres exploited a clause in the treaty to claim that most of the maroons did not surrender in time, and ordered their deportation.

Smith was one of a handful of Maroons to have met the deadline, and he was offered the opportunity to remain in Jamaica. However, he was so outraged by the governor's duplicity that he chose to go with the rest of the Trelawny Maroons into exile.

== Nova Scotia ==
The authorities of the Colony of Jamaica decided to deport the Trelawny Maroons to Nova Scotia. While they were in detention, Smith curried favour with the colonial authorities by identifying a number of runaway slaves who had fought on the side of Trelawny Town. When they reached Nova Scotia, Smith was regarded by his fellow maroons as a traitor. However, most maroon officers remained loyal to the runaways who fought on their side, and hundreds of them gained their freedom as a result of the conflict.

In a letter to his half-brother Samuels from Nova Scotia in 1797, Smith complained that the Maroons hated him and that they wanted to kill him. Walpole reported that Smith did not get on with other Maroon officers such as Leonard Parkinson and James Palmer. However, most Maroon officers remained loyal to the runaways who fought on their side, and hundreds of them gained their freedom as a result of the conflict.

== Sierra Leone ==
On the journey to Sierra Leone, Smith joined James in complaining about corruption in the distribution of provisions by another Maroon officer, Major Jarrett. On investigating the proceedings, superintendent George Ross found that James and Smith were correct, and he dismissed John Jarrett from his post.

When the ship carrying the Trelawny Maroons arrived in Freetown, the British authorities asked them for help in putting down a rebellion by the Black Nova Scotians. The Trelawny Maroons, including Smith, agreed, and after they put down the revolt, the Jamaican Maroons in Sierra Leone received the best land and houses.

== England ==
It appears that Smith was unhappy with his position in Sierra Leone, and he shortly afterwards migrated to England. In 1805, two Maroons from Sierra Leone, John Thorp or Thorpe and Andrew Smith, were recorded as living in Clapham in London, and they had their teenaged sons baptised there. Thorpe became a lawyer, but there is no evidence what happened to Smith, who probably died in England shortly afterwards.
