= Major Jarrett =

Major John Jarrett (died 1839) was a Jamaican Maroon leader of the Maroons of Cudjoe's Town (Trelawny Town) in Jamaica. He was most likely named after a neighbouring planter with a similar surname.

== Trelawny Town ==
John Jarrett was born in Trelawny Town, a town that is actually in St James Parish, not Trelawny. Jarrett was a captain of Trelawny Town, and he was a junior officer to Colonel Montague James. The Maroons were descendants of the runaway slaves of Jamaica. These slaves were primarily of Akan heritage, but also of Spanish, Miskito, and Taino heritage.

Originally known as Cudjoe's Town, under the leadership of Cudjoe, these Leeward Maroons fought for their independence during the First Maroon War of the 1730s. When Cudjoe signed the treaty of 1739, the Maroons of Cudjoe's Town officially secured their freedom.

In the years that followed 1739, Cudjoe's Town became known as Trelawny Town, named after the governor, Edward Trelawny, who agreed to terms with Cudjoe. John Jarrett was born a free Maroon in Trelawny Town. He rose to the rank of captain by the time the Second Maroon War broke out in 1795.

== Second Maroon War ==
A resident magistrate in Montego Bay mishandled a complaint over pigs when he ordered the whipping of two Trelawny Maroons, and this resulted in a conflict between Trelawny Town and the Jamaican colonial authorities. Captain John Jarrett followed Montague James in taking up arms against the British militias.

Despite having the better of a number of encounters, the Trelawny Maroons were unable to maintain their guerrilla campaign, and they eventually agreed to come to terms. However, the governor, Alexander Lindsay, 6th Earl of Balcarres, overturned a promise by Colonel George Walpole not to deport them from Jamaica.

== Nova Scotia ==
Jarrett was also one of about 580 Maroons who were transported from Jamaica in 1796 to Nova Scotia. Jarrett was promoted to major in Nova Scotia. He survived the ship's journey to Nova Scotia, and his family accumulated a significant amount of wealth in Canada. His success generated a certain amount of resentment, as another Maroon named William Barnet assaulted his daughter, Elsy, over a case of unrequited love. Her child with Maroon officer Charles Shaw was born premature, and Elsy blamed Barnet for that misfortune.

In 1800, James was finally successful in his petition to the British government for his Maroons to leave Nova Scotia. Jarrett was one of about 550 who then went to Freetown, Sierra Leone.

== Sierra Leone ==
On the journey to Sierra Leone, the colonial authorities put an English officer, John Sheriff, and a Maroon officer, Jarrett, in charge of distributing provisions. However, other Maroon officers such as Montague James and Andrew Smith (Maroon) alleged that Sheriff and Jarrett were corrupt in their practices, and on investigating the proceedings, superintendent George Ross found that James and Smith were correct, and he dismissed Sheriff and Jarrett from their posts.

When the ship carrying Jarrett and the Trelawny Maroons arrived in Freetown, the British authorities asked them for help in putting down a rebellion by the Black Nova Scotians. Montague James, Jarrett and the Trelawny Maroons agreed, and after they put down the revolt, the Jamaican Maroons in Sierra Leone received the best land and houses.

Shortly afterwards, Jarrett expressed satisfaction when Barnet eventually killed himself after murdering a Maroon woman named Fanny Williams.

Jarrett did not get on with the other Maroon officers, and when James selected his list of officers of the Jamaican Maroons in Sierra Leone, Jarrett was not one of them.

In 1839, a Liberated African apprentice, an Ibo named Martin, murdered his elderly Maroon employer, John Jarrett. A group of Maroons caught Martin, and they tortured him, and then burnt him to death. The Ibo in the colony demanded vengeance, and attacked Maroons in Freetown, forcing a number of them to flee for safety in the interior. After this incident, large numbers of Maroons no longer felt safe in Sierra Leone.

His descendants lived around Maroon Town, Sierra Leone and are a prominent Creole family. Some of the Jarretts immigrated to Liberia and assimilated into Americo-Liberian society.
