= Charles Samuels (maroon) =

Charles Samuels (d. c. early 1800s) was a maroon officer from Cudjoe's Town (Trelawny Town), and he was the brother of Captain Andrew Smith. Both officers reported to Colonel Montague James, the leader of Trelawny Town.

== Second Maroon War ==
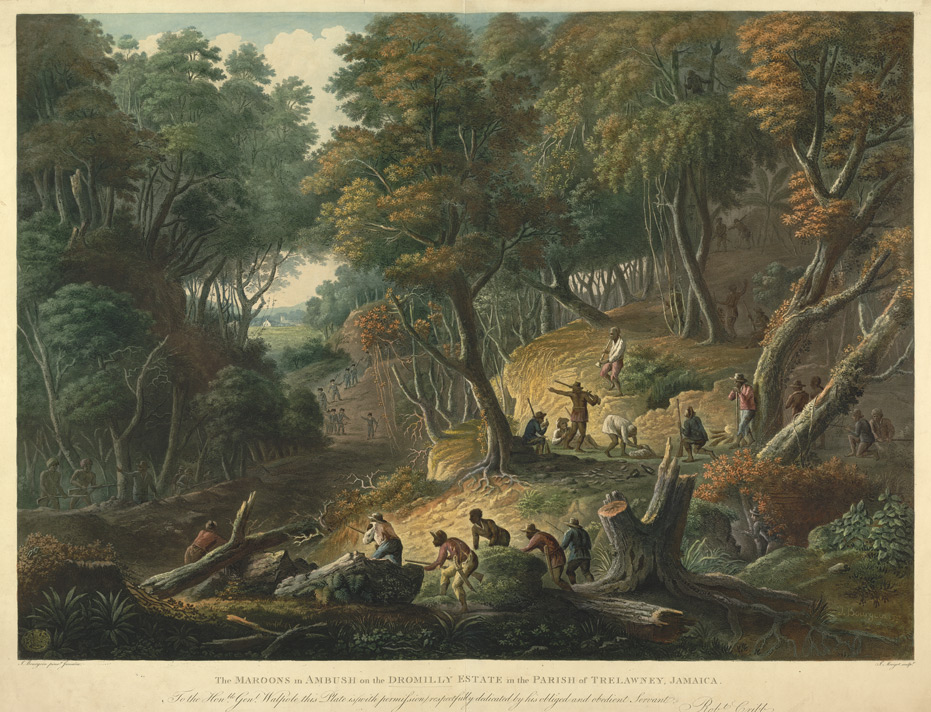
1801 aquatint of a maroon raid on the Dromilly estate, Jamaica, during the Second Maroon War of 1795–96

In 1795, when the Second Maroon War broke out between the Jamaican Maroons of Trelawny Town and the British colonial authorities in Jamaica, Charles Samuels fought on the side of the maroons. A year later, Colonel George Walpole persuaded them to lay down arms on a promise that they would not be deported from the island. The governor, Alexander Lindsay, 6th Earl of Balcarres, reversed that promise on a technicality, and deported Samuels and just under 600 Trelawny Maroons to Nova Scotia.

On the ship's voyage to Nova Scotia, 17 Maroons died, and another 19 perished in the harsh Nova Scotian winter of 1796–97.

== Exile in Nova Scotia ==
Montague James sent a number of petitions to the British government in London, as well as the colonial authorities in Jamaica, complaining about the cold and unfriendly conditions they encountered in Canada. Many of the petitions were sent to Walpole, who had become a Whig member of parliament, where he complained about the deportation of the Maroons from Jamaica. Montague James sent Charles Samuels from Nova Scotia to London, where he became a paid servant of Walpole, and provided him with information about the poor conditions being endured by the Maroons in Nova Scotia.

On his return trip from London to Nova Scotia, the ship Samuels was on was captured by the French. Imprisoned for several months, Samuels willingly told the French all he knew about Nova Scotia. Eventually freed, he returned to Nova Scotia, where the governor, Sir John Wentworth, tried in vain to find out what Samuels told the French.

== Relocation to Sierra Leone ==
The information provided by Samuels to Walpole contributed to the success of James in getting the Trelawny Maroons removed from Nova Scotia. In 1800, about 550 Maroons left Nova Scotia for Sierra Leone. In Sierra Leone, the Jamaican Maroons helped the British to put down a revolt by the Black Nova Scotians, after which the Jamaican Maroons in Sierra Leone received the best land and houses.

It is believed that Samuels died in the early 1800s.
