= Ferron Williams =

Jamaican Maroon politician

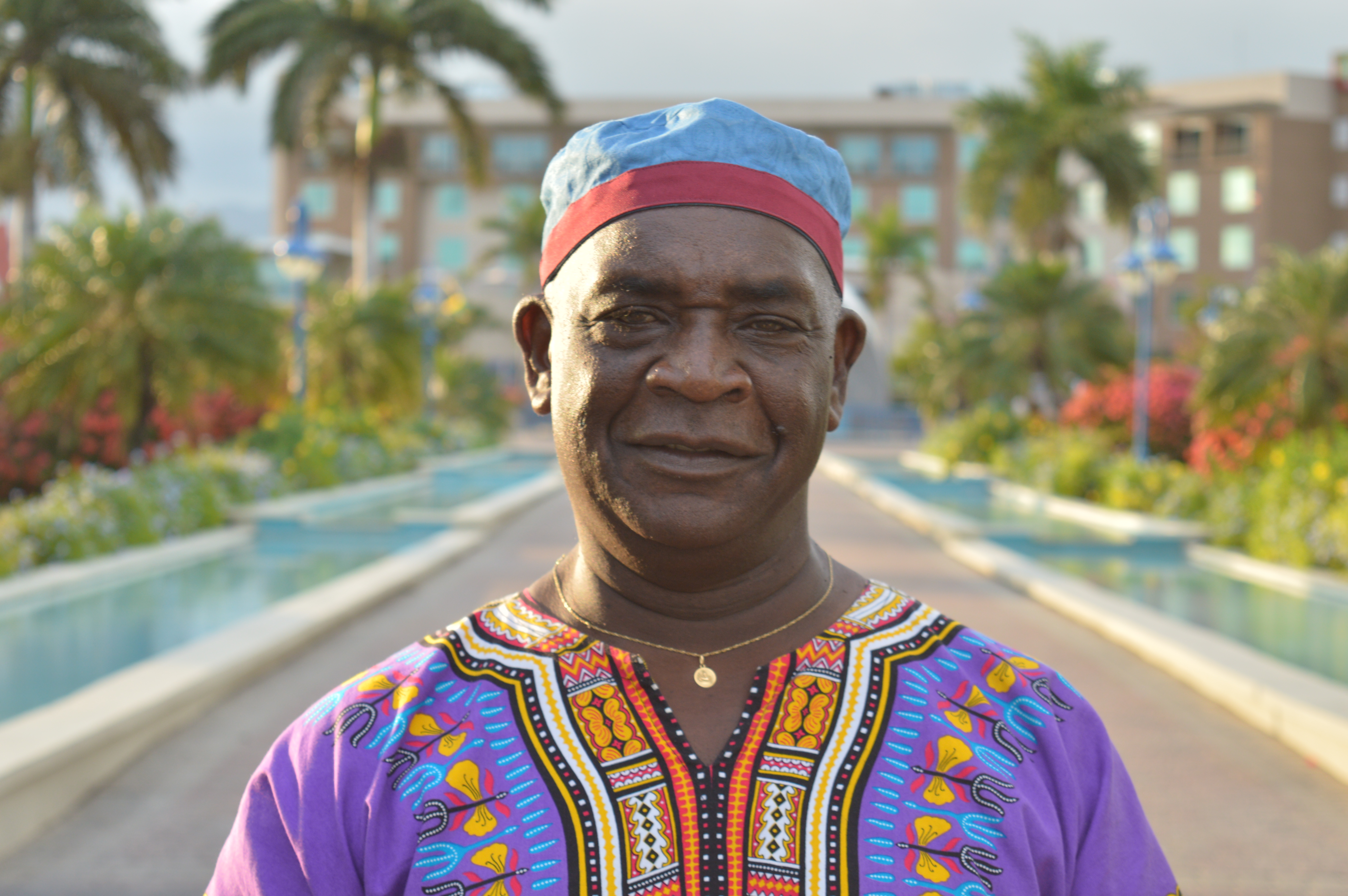
Ferron Williams

Ferron Williams is a Maroon politician and from 2009 to 2021 he was Colonel-in-Chief of Accompong, Jamaica.

== Biography ==
Ferron Williams was born on June 14, 1955, to parents Advira Elizabeth Anderson-Williams and Robert Williams, members of the Maroon community of Accompong. He attended local schools and joined the police service. After 37 years Williams resigned from the force at the rank of Inspector of Police.

He was elected as Colonel-in-Chief of Accompong in 2009. This position leads the Maroon Council, with whom the Colonel shares executive responsibilities. On April 16, 2015, Colonel Williams was elected to his second term in office. After 11 years as Colonel of Accompong, he was succeeded by Richard Currie following his defeat in an election held in February 2021.

He has become notable for his climate change program, which seeks to protect the ecology of the Island's Cockpit region, where this Maroon community is located. Additionally, he has become notable for his unprecedented efforts to build a cultural and economic bridge between Accompong and the Kingdom of Ashanti in Ghana. Both groups are descendants of the Akan and Asante people, whom the Maroons claim as ancestors. Ferron has worked with Africans on climate change issues.
