= Acheampong =

Acheampong is an Ashanti surname which means 'destined for greatness' or 'the one that give birth to kings'. A variation of the name contains the prefix owo Ahene and means 'the one that give birth to kings and queens'. Notable people with the surname include:

- Benjamin Acheampong (born 1990), Ghanaian footballer
- Gemma Acheampong (born 1993), American-Ghanaian track and field athlete
- Faustina Acheampong, wife of Ignatius Kutu Acheampong, First Lady of Ghana
- Frank Acheampong (born 1993), Ghanaian footballer
- Ignatius Kutu Acheampong (1931–1979), former President of Ghana
- Joachin Yaw Acheampong (born 1973), Ghanaian footballer
- Joey Acheampong (born 1982), Ghanaian footballer, scored 29 goals for Aylesbury United F.C. in 2010–2014
- Josh Acheampong (born 2006), English footballer
- Kwame Nkrumah-Acheampong (born 1974), Ghanaian skier
- Nana Acheampong, Ghanaian musician
- Patrick Kwateng Acheampong (born 1951), Ghanaian lawyer
- Rebecca Akosua Acheampomaa Acheampong (born 1984), popularly known as Becca, Ghanaian singer
- Vivienne Acheampong, British actor and comedian.

== See also ==
- Emmanuel Akyeampong, professor of history and African and African American studies
- Accompong, a Maroon town in Jamaica
