= Cudjoe's Town (Trelawny Town) =

Settlement of Jamaican Maroons in Westmoreland, Jamaica

The Second Maroon War
- Part of the Atlantic Revolutions and the Slave Revolts in North America
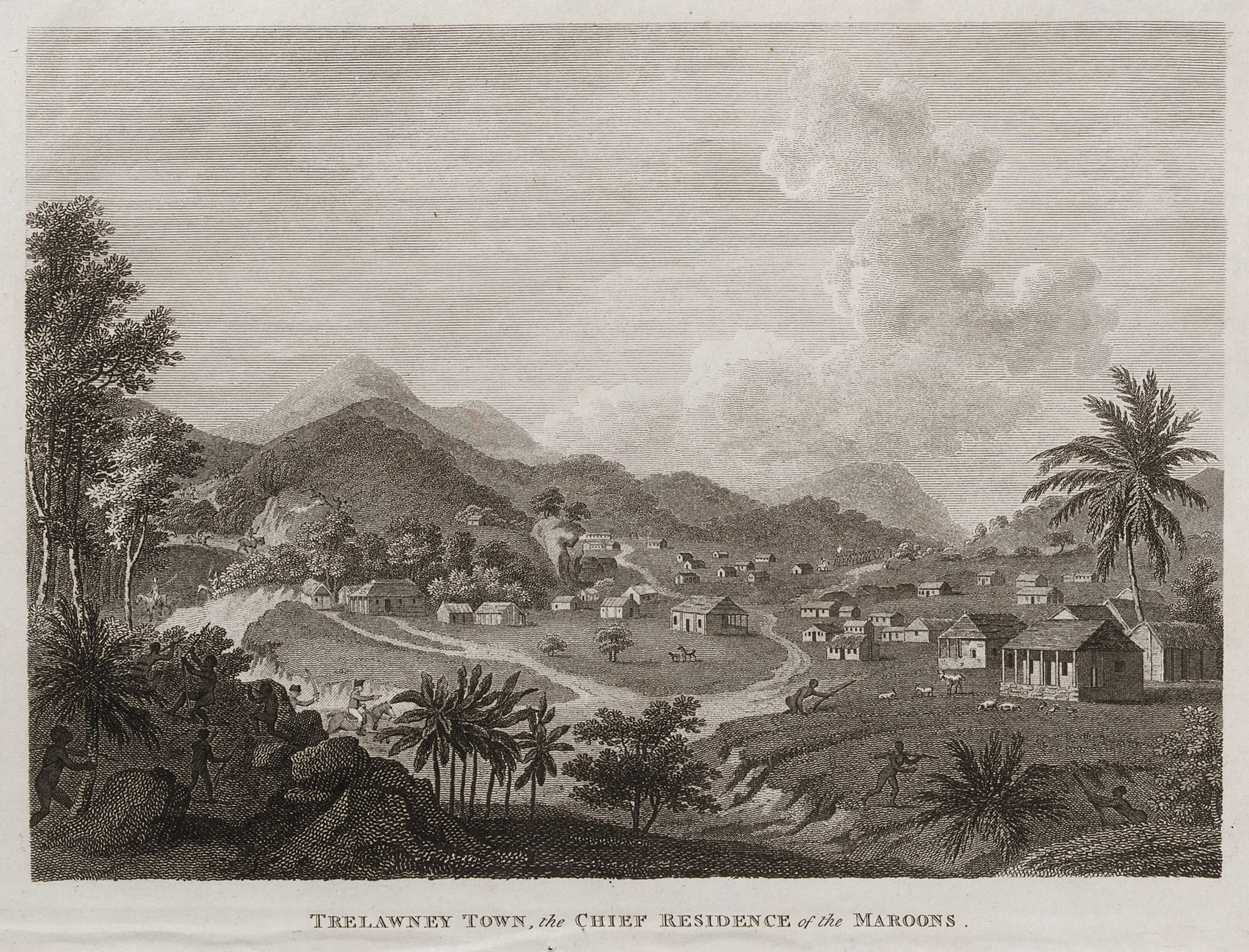
- Illustration of Trelawney Town
Date	1795 – 1796
Location	Jamaica

Cudjoe's Town was located in the mountains in the southern extremities of the parish of St James, close to the border of Westmoreland, Jamaica.

In 1690, a large number of Akan freedom fighters already living in the mountains launched an assault on the Sutton's Estate in Clarendon, central Jamaica, freeing between 300 and 400 enslaved people. They established a new town of Free black people in Jamaica, in the forested mountains of the island's interior, in the Cockpit Country. Naquan, Cudjoe's father, was allegedly the one who orchestrated this rebellion. Naquan was succeeded by Cudjoe, the first leader of this group of Jamaican Maroons in western Jamaica.

== Cudjoe's Town ==
This town was eventually named after Cudjoe, who according to Maroon oral history is the son of Naquan. Cudjoe was the Maroon warrior who led them into battle during the First Maroon War in the 1730s.

The Maroons of Cudjoe's Town, known as Leeward Maroons, fought the British colonial forces to a standstill in the 1730s, until Governor Edward Trelawny felt compelled to offer Cudjoe a peace treaty. After some initial suspicion, Cudjoe signed the treaty in 1739, reportedly at Petty River Bottom, near the present-day village of Flagstaff. However, the Maroons of Accompong Town believe that the treaty was signed by Cudjoe in their Maroon town.

The Maroon town eventually became known to the colonial authorities as Trelawny Town. The 1739 treaty initially only recognised the existence of Cudjoe's Town, which they called Trelawny Town, and failed to identify Accompong Town as another Maroon town that fell under Cudjoe's jurisdiction.

== Trelawny Town ==
Trelawny Town was located in the Saint James Parish, Jamaica, not Trelawny. The town and the parish were both named after Governor Trelawny. After the treaty of 1739, both the colonial authorities, generals and Maroons gradually stopped calling it Cudjoe's Town, and started to call it Trelawny Town. Trelawny Town's population grew from 276 in 1740 to 362 in 1770, to 594 in 1788.

In 1758, a Trelawny Town captain named Furry built houses on the land belonging to a St James planter, and Governor Roger Hope Elletson forced Furry and his followers to vacate the land, and return to Trelawny Town, in return for financial compensation from the Jamaican Assembly. In 1770, Furry complained that he and his men never received the promised financial compensation, after which the Assembly eventually paid the outstanding £150. The length of these delays contributed to rising discontent in Trelawny Town.

Leeward Maroons from Trelawny Town helped the colonial authorities to put down the rebellions of Tacky and Apongo between 1760-6, and were financially rewarded for their assistance.

== Second Maroon War ==
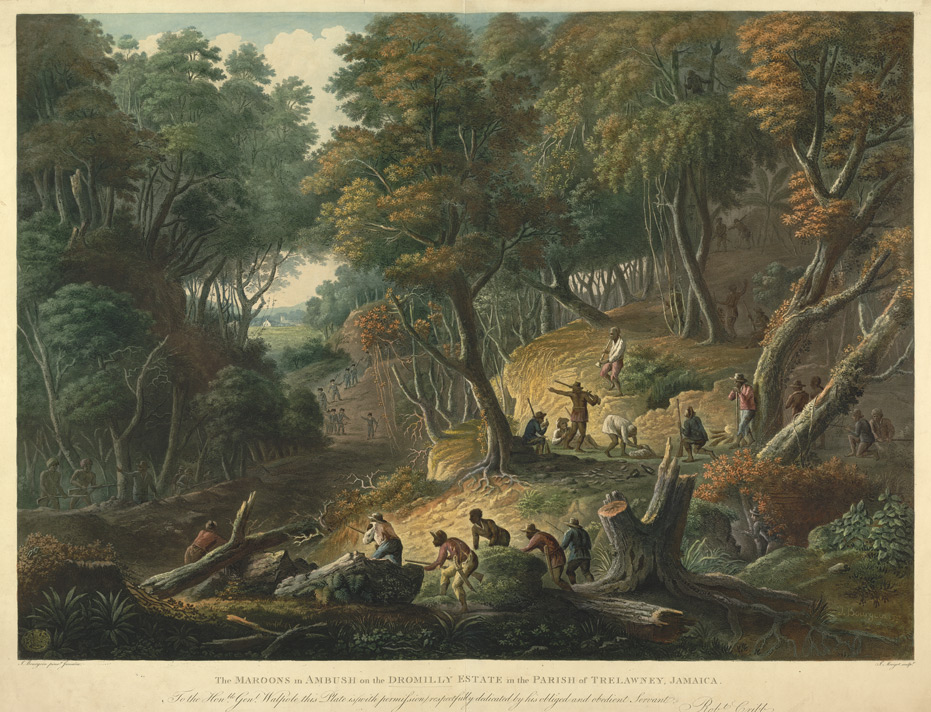
1801 aquatint of a maroon raid on the Dromilly estate, Jamaica, during the Second Maroon War of 1795–6.

Because of their population growth, in the second half of the eighteenth century, there were a number of land disputes between Trelawny Town and neighbouring planters. When the Assembly sided with the planters in these disputes, the tension that occurred as a result exploded in the form of the Second Maroon War of 1795–6. When Trelawny Town was ruled by the white superintendents father-and-son team of John James and John Montague James, they were able to quell these disputes. However, when the Jamaican Assembly dismissed the James family, and appointed the inexperienced Thomas Craskell as superintendent, then Maroon colonel Montague James took control of Trelawny Town, and dismissed Craskell from his post.

The Second Maroon War of 1795-6 was sparked when the magistrate of Montego Bay unwisely ordered that two Trelawny Town Maroons, one named Peter Campbell, be flogged by slaves for stealing two pigs. This action outraged the Maroons of Trelawny Town, and led to Montague James ousting Craskell, and renewing calls for more land, and the reinstatement of his friend, John James, as superintendent. The casualties suffered by the colonial militias were higher than those suffered by the Maroons. In the first two weeks of the conflict, the Maroons of Trelawny Town had killed 65 British soldiers without any Maroon death reported. Throughout the entire conflict, one general complained that the colonial forces had killed less than 32 Maroons and their allies. Recent research shows that the colonial militias were only able to kill about 16 Trelawnys. The Maroon warriors also laid waste to a number of sugar estates in western Jamaica.

Hundreds of runaway slaves secured their freedom by fighting alongside Trelawny Town. They formed independent communities first under Cuffee (Jamaica), and then at Me-no-Sen-You-no-Come.

However, the Maroons of Trelawny Town were unable to maintain their guerrilla campaign during the drought months, and Colonel George Walpole employed a scorched-earth policy, backed up by the importation of hunting dogs. By 22 December Walpole was able to persuade Montague James and his Maroon lieutenants, including Major Jarrett, Charles Samuels and Andrew Smith, to come to terms.

Walpole promised the Maroons that they would not be transported off the island if they laid down their arms, and the Trelawny Town warriors agreed to submit to terms. However, the governor, Alexander Lindsay, 6th Earl of Balcarres, exploited a loophole to reverse Walpole's promise, and he promptly arranged for the deportation of just under 600 Trelawny Town Maroons to Nova Scotia, where they became Black Nova Scotians.

== Trelawny Town in Exile ==
As many as 58 Trelawny Town Maroons avoided deportation to Nova Scotia, and they remained in Jamaica, some settling in Accompong Town, while others merged with the free black population. The Second Maroon War proved costly to the colonial authorities, and in an attempt to recoup their losses, the Jamaica Assembly auctioned off most of the 1,500 acres belonging to Trelawny Town.

The Maroons were unhappy with the conditions of their exile in Nova Scotia, and they regularly petitioned the British government to be relocated to another colony. In 1800, the British government eventually agreed to transport the Trelawny Maroons to Sierra Leone, where they helped to suppress a rebellion by the Black Nova Scotians. As a reward, the Sierra Leone colonial authorities granted the Jamaican Maroons in Sierra Leone the best houses and land, which originally belonged to the Black Nova Scotians.

After the Second Maroon War, the colonial authorities converted Trelawny Town into a military barracks, and renamed it Maroon Town, Jamaica. The Trelawny Maroons flourished in Sierra Leone at first, but their situation soon soured, and they submitted petitions to British government, asking for permission to return to Jamaica. These petitions were turned down.

However, in 1831, another petition was presented by 224 Sierra Leone Maroons to the British government, and this time the Jamaican authorities relented. They responded by saying they would place no obstacle in the way of Maroons returning to Jamaica, but would not pay any passage or the purchase of lands in the island.

== The Returned Maroons of Flagstaff ==
After slavery was abolished in 1838, the Jamaican colonial authorities imported labourers from Sierra Leone, and among that number were a small number of Trelawny Town Maroons. These Returned Maroons established themselves in nearby Flagstaff, and their descendants are still there today.

In 1839, the first Maroons made their way from Sierra Leone to Jamaica. Mary Brown and her family, which included her daughter Sarah McGale and a Spanish son-in-law, sold off their property in Sierra Leone, bought a schooner, and set sail for Jamaica. They were joined by two other Sierra Leone Maroons, Mary Ricketts and her daughter Jane Bryan. In 1841, this group found their way to Trelawny Town, now called Maroon Town, but which they still insisted on calling Cudjoe's Town.

Brown, Ricketts and their families petitioned the Jamaican Assembly, pointing out they had used up all their resources in returning to their homeland, and requested financial assistance in purchasing the property of their ancestors. However, their request was ignored by the Jamaican Assembly, so Brown, Ricketts and their families settled on land near Maroon Town, contributing to the establishment of the village of Flagstaff. Their descendants, the Returned Maroons, still live there today.

In 1841, the first ship to arrive in Sierra Leone looking for African workers was the Hector, and several Maroons were so desperate to leave Sierra Leone that they did not wait for the ship to dock, but rowed out to meet it in their canoes. In all, 64 Maroons left Sierra Leone for Jamaica on the Hector alone. Most Sierra Leone Maroons lived in Freetown, and between 1837 and 1844, Freetown's Maroon population shrank from 650 to 454, suggesting that about 200 made their way back to Jamaica.

As many as one-third of the Maroons in Sierra Leone returned to Jamaica in the 1840s. Among those who returned was Peter Campbell, whose flogging by the authorities of Montego Bay sparked the Second Maroon War.

Some historians believe that the Returned Maroons were absorbed into existing Maroon towns. However, Returned Maroon oral historians describe how many of their ancestors landed at Lucea, Jamaica, working on the canefields of Westmoreland Parish, as well as Hampden and Long Pond in Trelawny, before eventually settling in Flagstaff. In the 1840s, Nancy Gardner Prince, an American traveller, met several of these Returned Maroons.

In 1905, visitors to Maroon Town observed some Returned Maroons from nearby Flagstaff hunting wild hogs.

However, the numbers of people identifying as Maroons in Sierra Leone continued to decline after the Returned Maroon migration to Jamaica. In 2011, representatives of Flagstaff travelled to Maroon Town, Sierra Leone to re-establish connections.

== Government of Trelawny Town ==
=== Maroon leaders ===
1720s - 1764 Colonel Cudjoe

1764 - ? Colonel Lewis

1790s - 1812 Colonel Montague James

=== White superintendents ===
c. 1740s Dr William Russell

c. 1761 - 1767 John Scott

Late 1760s John Kidd, William Carson and Thomas Burke

1767 - 1787 John James (promoted to the position of Superintendent-General of all Jamaican Maroons)

c. 1773 Thomas Leamy

c. 1779 - 1792/3 John Montague James

1792/3 - 1795 Thomas Craskell
