= Three Fingered Jack (Jamaica) =

Three-Fingered Jack a.k.a. Jack Mansong (died c. 1781), led a band of runaway slaves in the Colony of Jamaica in the eighteenth century.

Many historians believed that after the Jamaican Maroons signed treaties with the British colonial authorities in 1739 and 1740, the treaty-signatories effectively prevented runaway slaves from forming independent communities in the mountainous forests of the interior of the island of Jamaica.

== Ankomah ==
However, a number of communities of runaways continued to thrive in the Blue Mountains in the decades that followed the 1740 treaty between the Windward Maroons and the British colonial authorities. The leader of one of those unofficial maroon communities of Free black people in Jamaica was an escaped slave named Ankomah or Ancoma. His community thrived in the forested interior of the eastern edge of the Blue Mountains in the eastern parish of what is now Saint Thomas Parish in the mid-1750s.

In 1759, two women, one of them from an official Maroon community that had signed treaties with the colonial authorities, conspired to kill Ancoma, and they received rewards from the Jamaican Assembly for their accomplishment. However, runaways continued to live in Ancoma's community for years after his death, and they continued to be a thorn in the side of Jamaican planter society.

== Origins of Three-Fingered Jack ==
In the late 1770s and early 1780s, Three-Fingered Jack formed a runaway maroon community in the same part of the parish of St Thomas-in-the-East, probably with some descendants of Ancoma's community. Some historians believed that Jack Mansong operated as a sole bandit, like a Jamaican Robin Hood, a claim repeated by monuments erected by the Jamaican government.

However, Jack Mansong was the leader of a band of runaway slaves that so troubled the colonial authorities that they offered a number of rewards for Jack, his deputies, and any of the maroons who fought on his side.

== Death of Jack Mansong ==
In 1781, Three-Fingered Jack was killed by a party of Maroons. Some historians and contemporary writers claimed that a single Maroon named James Reeder killed Jack in hand-to-hand combat, securing his freedom as a result.

Colonial records show that Jack was killed by a party of Maroons led by the white superintendent of Scott's Hall (Jamaica), Bernard Nalty, and included Maroon warriors from Charles Town, Jamaica such as John Reeder, Samuel Grant and a young Maroon warrior named Little Quaco. These Maroons were already freedmen when they killed Jack.

== Aftermath ==
Several of Jack's lieutenants were tried at the court in Yallahs, and sentenced to death. However, other deputies of Jack's continued to lead his runaway community in the years that followed his death. The Assembly offered rewards for the apprehension or killing of two of Jack's deputies, Dagger and Toney. In 1792, the colonial militia captured Dagger, and sentenced him to be resold into slavery in the Spanish colonies, but they were unable to catch Toney or the rest of Jack's community, which continued to live and thrive in the Blue Mountains.

In 1798, when he was approaching old age, Reeder petitioned the Jamaican Assembly for a pension, detailing his role in killing Three Fingered Jack, and he received his annual pension three years later. When he died in 1816 in Charles Town, and was buried in a Maroon funeral, Little Quaco, who had by now converted to Christianity and was now named William Carmichael Cockburn, petitioned the Assembly for his pension, and it was granted to him.
