= Me-no-Sen-You-no-Come =

Village in Jamaica

Coordinates: 18°16′23.52″N 77°42′42.12″W

Me-no-Sen-You-no-Come is a village in the Cockpit Country of western Jamaica. It is now a part of a district called Aberdeen, Jamaica, in the north-east section of Saint Elizabeth Parish, and is not extinct, as was originally believed. From the Jamaican dialect, the village name translates in English as, 'If I don't send for you, don't come.'

Located at 430 metres above sea level, it was founded by runaway slaves escaping from estates in Trelawny Parish at the start of the nineteenth century.

== Origins ==
In 1812, a community of runaways started when a dozen men and some women escaped from the sugar plantations of Trelawny into the Cockpit Country, and they created a village named Me-no-Sen-You-no-Come. It is located near some cliffs and boasted fertile soils in its valleys. The unofficial maroon community of Free black people in Jamaica grew from its start of less than 20 runaway slaves to a large village that supported 14 buildings with shingle roofs and wood floors, raised poultry, hogs and nearly two hundred acres of cultivated land, thickly planted with provisions.

It is believed that runaway slaves who secured their freedom during the Second Maroon War, and had been a part of the community of Cuffee, joined Me-no-Sen-You-no-Come in succeeding years.

== Conflict with colonial authorities ==
By the 1820s, Me-no-Sen-You-no-Come housed between 50 and 60 runaways. The headmen of the community were escaped slaves named Warren and Forbes. Me-no-Sen-You-no-Come also conducted a thriving trade with slaves from the north coast, who exchanged their salt provisions with the runaways for their ground provisions.

In October 1824, the colonial militias tried to destroy this maroon community. Some historians believe that the Maroons of Accompong Town successfully crushed this runaway community.

However, recent research shows that these Maroons had limited success, because after they left Me-no-Sen-You-no-Come to return to Accompong Town, a number of the runaways returned to the village and rebuilt huts. The Accompong Maroons succeeded only in killing one man, and capturing two women and three children.

== Legacy ==
The community of Me-no-Sen-You-no-Come continued to thrive in the Cockpit Country until Emancipation in the 1830s. It is located in the southwest corner of the Cockpit Country, which is called "The District of Look Behind," now a part of the Upper Aberdeen community, because the redcoats rode two to a horse, one man facing the rear and nervously scanning the trees.

Today, Me-no-Sen-You-no-Come is called Quickstep.

Jamaican poet Kei Miller wrote a poem about Me-no-Sen-You-no-Come.
