= Cuffee (Jamaica) =

Cuffee was an escaped slave in Jamaica who led other runaway slaves to form a community of free black people in Jamaica in the island's forested interior, and they raided white plantation owners at the end of the eighteenth century. The name Cuffee is a variation of the Akan name Kofi, which is the name given to a boy born on a Friday.

== Origins ==
In 1798, Cuffee escaped from a Jamaican plantation run by James McGhie, and he found refuge in the forested interior of the Cockpit Country. Many of the escaped slaves who joined his community had secured their freedom by fighting in the Second Maroon War.

== Cuffee's community of runaway slaves ==
It was previously believed that Cuffee only led a small band of just 43 runaway slaves. However, recent research has shown that Cuffee's community counted more than twice that number of runaway slaves. The community was so large that they occupied several makeshift villages in the Cockpit Country, with their headquarters at a place called High Windward. Even though Cuffee was identified by Governor Alexander Lindsay, 6th Earl of Balcarres, as the headman, slave informers told the colonial authorities that Cuffee's maroon community had a revolving headman leadership structure.

Having secured muskets and ammunition from the Maroons of Cudjoe's Town (Trelawny Town), Cuffee and his men were well-armed and conducted a series of raids on plantations in western Jamaica. They destroyed estates such as Venture, Cox-heath pen, Pantre-Pant and Oxford. Many western planters claimed that their suffering at the hands of Cuffee's maroons was worse than what they endured under the Second Maroon War. Armed slaves sent out against them defected and joined Cuffee's community. Jamaican Maroons from Accompong Town tried to subdue Cuffee's community of runaways, but in vain.

== Decline of Cuffee's community ==
Eventually, members of the slave "Black Shot" killed two of the revolving headmen, Prince and Hercules, and captured half a dozen runaway slaves. However, Cuffee then withdrew the majority of his community further into the Cockpit Country, and they were never subdued.

It is believed that members of Cuffee's community eventually joined the village of Me-no-Sen-You-no-Come, which was a refuge for runaway slaves in the Cockpit Country in the nineteenth century.
