= Maroon Council =

On the Island of Jamaica, the Maroon Council is the executive body with administrative powers and obligations for the Maroon communities. Maroon Council members are appointed by the Colonel-in-Chief (Colonel), while the Colonel is officially elected by the community as the Head of Government.

Each Maroon Community (Accompong, Nanny Town, Charles Town, Trelawny Town, and Scotts Hall) has its own independent Maroon Council with legislative authority.
