= Montague James =

Maroon leader of Cudjoe's Town (Trelawny Town)

Montague James (d. c. 1812) was a Maroon leader of Cudjoe's Town (Trelawny Town) in the last decade of eighteenth-century Jamaica. It is possible that Maroon colonel Montague James took his name from the white superintendent of Trelawny Town, John Montague James.

== Maroon leader ==
In 1792, Montague James petitioned the House of Assembly of Jamaica to complain that the Maroons of Trelawny Town needed more land to support their growing population. However, the Assembly ignored this petition.

Trelawny Town was ruled by first John James, and then his son, John Montague James, who were superintendents of the Maroon town, and the Maroon leader, Montague James, reported to them. However, the Jamaican Assembly dismissed John James and his son from the superintendency of Trelawny Town, and appointed the inexperienced Thomas Craskell as superintendent. Then, Montague James took control of Trelawny Town, and dismissed Craskell from his post.

== Second Maroon War ==
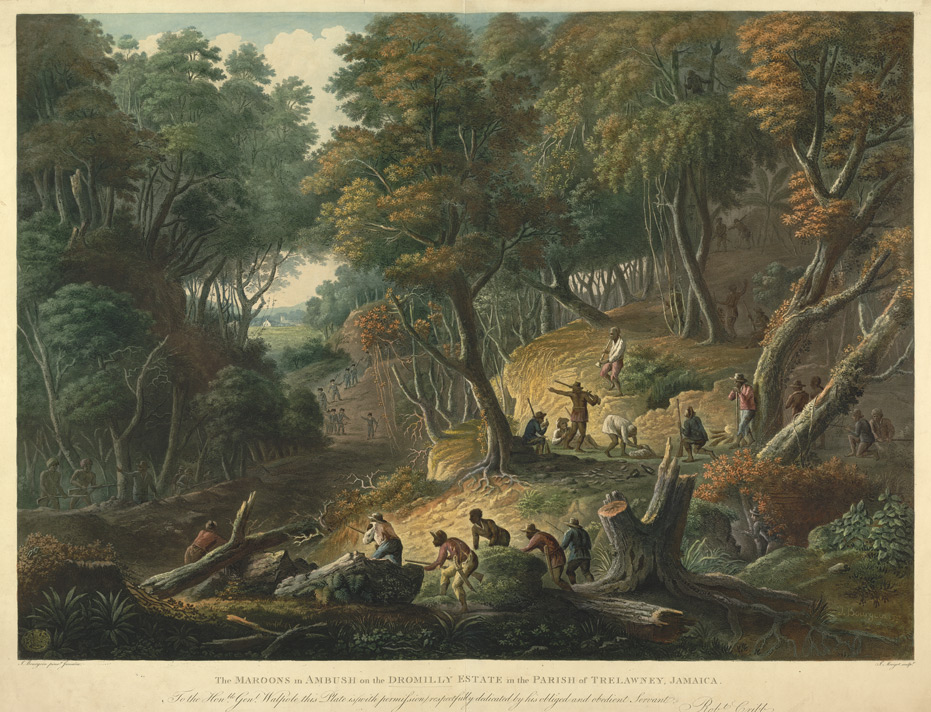
1801 aquatint of a maroon raid on the Dromilly estate, Jamaica, during the Second Maroon War of 1795–6.

The Second Maroon War of 1795–96 was sparked when the magistrate of Montego Bay unwisely ordered that two Trelawny Town Maroons be flogged by slaves for stealing two pigs. This action outraged the Maroons of Trelawny Town, and led to Montague James ousting Craskell, and renewing calls for more land, and the reinstatement of his friend, John James, as superintendent. When Montague James initially tried to discuss peace terms, the governor ordered his imprisonment. However, when it became obvious that war was inevitable, the governor ordered the release of Montague James, and asked him to convince his Maroon warriors to lay down their arms. Instead, Montague James told his warriors how badly he had been treated, and the Jamaican Maroons burnt their towns, and retreated into the Cockpit Country to carry out a campaign of guerrilla warfare.

The casualties suffered by the colonial militias were higher than those suffered by the Maroons. In the first two weeks of the conflict, the Maroons of Trelawny Town had killed 65 British soldiers without any Maroon death reported. The Maroon warriors also laid waste to a number of sugar estates in western Jamaica. Hundreds of runaway slaves secured their freedom by fighting for Montague James and Trelawny Town.

Montague James was served by a number of able lieutenants, who were able to conduct a successful guerrilla campaign, including Major Jarrett, Andrew Smith (Maroon), Charles Samuels (Maroon), Leonard Parkinson and James Palmer. However, the Maroons of Trelawny Town were unable to maintain their guerrilla campaign during the drought months, when Colonel George Walpole employed a scorched-earth policy, backed up by the importation of hunting dogs, By 22 December Walpole was able to persuade the Maroons to come to terms.

The Maroons had the better of the skirmishes, so they only laid down their arms and surrendered in December 1795 on condition they would not be deported. Walpole gave the Maroons his word that they would not be transported off the island. The governor of Jamaica, Alexander Lindsay, 6th Earl of Balcarres, ratified the treaty, but gave the Maroons only three days to present themselves to beg forgiveness on 1 January 1796. Suspicious of British intentions, most of the Maroons did not surrender until mid-March, by which time the conflict had proved to be very costly to the island, and resulted in the ruin of many plantations and estates. Balcarres used the contrived breach of treaty as a pretext to deport the Trelawny town Maroons to Nova Scotia.

However, 58 Trelawny Town Maroons were able to secure permission to stay in Jamaica, while just under 600 were transported to Canada.

== Nova Scotia ==
On the journey to Nova Scotia, 17 Maroons died on board ship, and another 19 died in one of the worst winters Nova Scotia had ever experienced. In 1797, Montague James petitioned Walpole, now an MP in the House of Commons, complaining about their miserable conditions, and he sent Charles Samuels to England to describe their circumstances.

In 1798, Montague James wrote further complaints to Walpole the following year, Walpole raised the issue in the House. However, Secretary of War Henry Dundas, 1st Viscount Melville supported the decision by the government of the Colony of Jamaica to deport the Trelawny Maroons. Montague James then threatened to kill cattle for food, and he incurred a standoff with troops sent by John Wentworth (governor). In 1800, Montague James eventually got his way, and the Maroons secured a passage to Sierra Leone.

== Sierra Leone ==
The Jamaican Maroons in Sierra Leone proved to be able supporters of the colonial government. On docking in Sierra Leone, the ship officers discovered that the Black Nova Scotians were rebelling against the colonial authorities. They persuaded the Maroons to help them to put down the revolt, in return for which they received the best housing and land in their new home.

In 1801, Montague James, already an old man, was granted a pension by the colonial government of Sierra Leone.

In 1809, Sierra Leone Governor Thomas Perronet Thompson officially appointed Montague James, still the unofficial leader of the Maroons, a de facto one-man provisional government of the Maroons.

Montague James died in Sierra Leone in 1812.
