= William Fitch (British Army officer) =

18th century British soldier

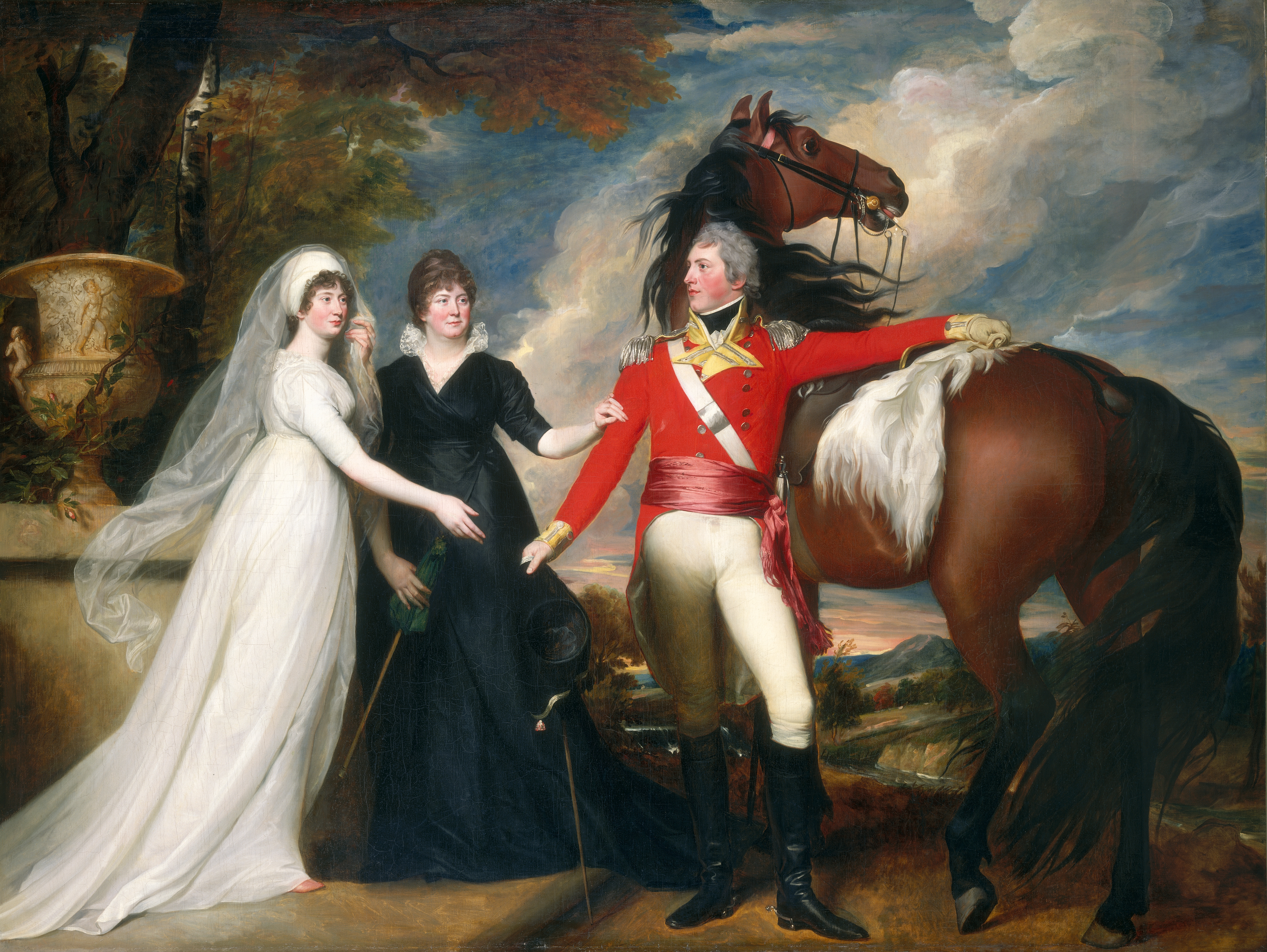
- Colonel William Fitch and His Sisters by John Singleton Copley
- Died: 1795
- Military career
- Allegiance: United Kingdom
- Branch: British Army
- Rank: Lieutenant Colonel
- Unit: 83rd (County of Dublin) Regiment of Foot
- Conflicts: Second Maroon War

Lieutenant-Colonel William Fitch (died 1795) was a British Army officer, who was killed fighting the Jamaican Maroons during the Second Maroon War.

== Military career ==
Fitch was commissioned into the 65th Regiment of Foot on 28 November 1775. He was promoted, in the same regiment, to lieutenant on 2 January 1779 and to captain on 7 December 1779.

Fitch was then promoted to major in the 51st Regiment of Foot on 30 November 1791, and then transferred to the 55th Regiment of Foot on 25 April 1792, before being appointed Lieutenant-Colonel Commandant of the 83rd Regiment of Foot on 28 September 1793.

== Death ==
Fitch embarked for the West Indies in May 1795 and was deployed to Jamaica where he was killed in action later that year during the Second Maroon War.

Newly arrived in Jamaica, Fitch ignored the advice of his experienced Maroon trackers, and led his forces into an ambush by the Maroons of Cudjoe's Town, which resulted in the deaths of Fitch, many members of the white militia, and a number of Accompong warriors.

== Sources ==
- Memoirs and Services of the Eighty-third Regiment, County of Dublin, from 1793 to 1907. London: Hugh Rees. 1908.
