= Accompong =

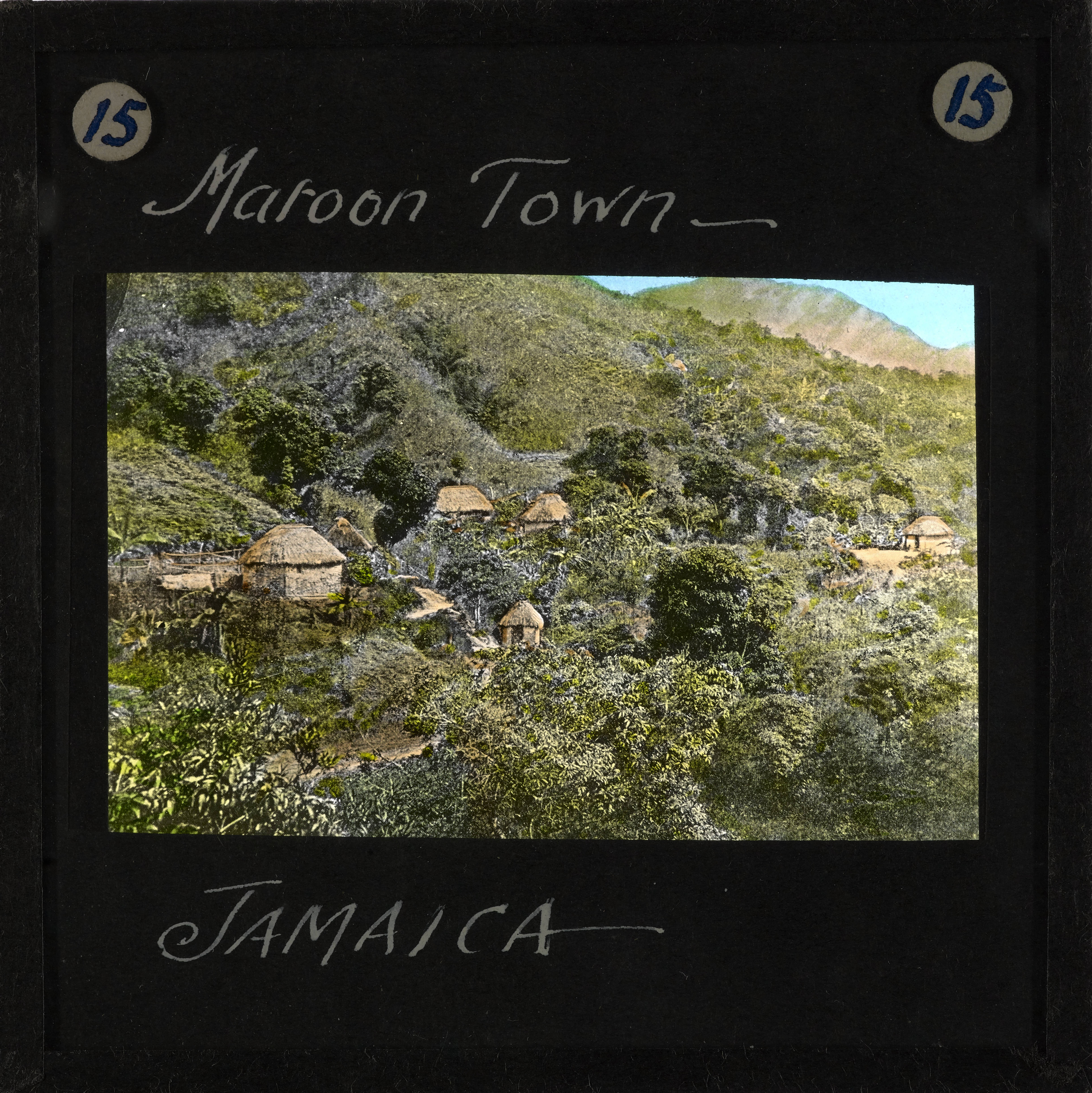
- Accompong, Jamaica, early 20th century

- Flag
- Nickname: Acheampong
- Motto: For the Born and the Unborn
- Location within Jamaica
- Coordinates: 18°14′N 77°45′W
- Country: Jamaica
- Parish: St. Elizabeth Parish

Area
  - Total: 4.04 km^{2} (1.56 sq mi)

Population
  - Total: 788
- Website: stateofaccompong.org

Accompong (from the Asante name Acheampong) is a historical Maroon village located in the hills of St. Elizabeth Parish on the island of Jamaica. It is located in Cockpit Country, where Jamaican Maroons established a fortified stronghold in the hilly terrain in the 17th century. They defended it and maintained independence from the Spanish and then later the British, after the colony changed hands.

Accompong is reportedly named after the son of Miguel Reid, the first African Maroon leader in western Jamaica originally from Ghana and allegedly the first leader of Cudjoe's Town (Trelawny Town). This would make Accompong brother to Kojo or Cudjoe, and possibly Cuffee, Quaco and Nanny of the Maroons. Accompong Town was reportedly built by Kojo who assigned his Brother Accompong to watch over it.

Accompong is run by a chief who is elected by voting. The current chief is Richard Currie.

== Accompong Town under Accompong ==
In the 18th century, Maroon leader Cudjoe is said to have united his people under the Kindah Tree, as they struggled for autonomy. This was the site for signing the 1739 treaty with the British, according to this Maroon town's oral history. This legendary, ancient mango tree is still standing (2009). The tree symbolizes the common kinship of the community on its common land. However, the Returned Maroons of Flagstaff believe that the treaty was signed at Petty River Bottom, near the village of Flagstaff.

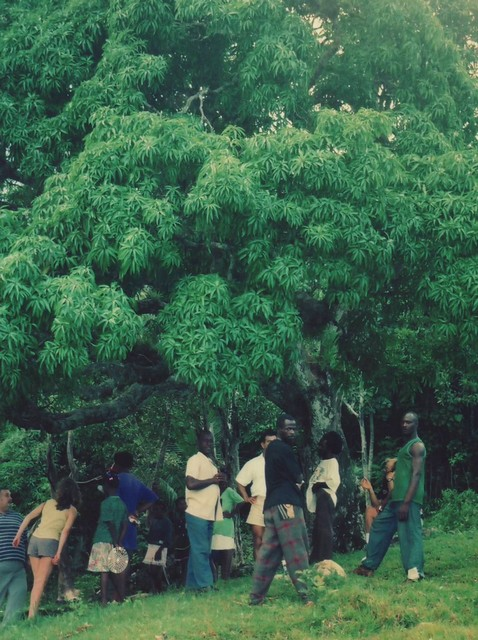
The Kindah Tree of Accompong, near where the Maroons signed a treaty with the British in 1739 that established their autonomy

During the First Maroon War, rebel slaves and their descendants fought a guerrilla war to secure the independence of Free Black people in Jamaica against the British. Hostilities were finally ended by a treaty between the two groups in 1739, signed under British governor Edward Trelawny. It granted Cudjoe's Maroons 1500 acres of land between their strongholds of Cudjoe's Town (Trelawny Town) and Accompong in the Cockpits. While the treaty granted this land to Trelawny Town, it did not recognize Accompong Town. In 1756, following a land dispute between Maroons from Accompong Town and neighbouring planters, the Assembly specifically granted Accompong Town an additional 1,000 acres of land.

The treaty also granted the Maroons a certain amount of political autonomy and economic freedoms, in return for their providing military support in case of invasion or rebellion. They also had to agree to return runaway slaves, for which they were paid a bounty of two dollars each. This last clause in the treaty caused tension between the Maroons and the enslaved Black population. From time to time refugees from the plantations continued to find their way to Maroon settlements and were sometimes allowed to stay. However, Accompong Maroons earned an income from hunting runaways on behalf of neighbouring planters.

After the treaty, Cudjoe ruled Trelawny Town, while his brother-in-arms, Accompong, ruled Accompong Town. In 1751, planter Thomas Thistlewood recorded meeting Accompong, whom he called 'Capt. Compoon'. The planter described the Maroon leader as "about my size, in a Ruffled Shirt, Blue Broad Cloth Coat, Scarlet Cuffs to his Sleeves, gold buttons...and Black Hatt, White linen Breeches puff’d at the knee, no stockings or shoes on".

In 1755, Zacharias Caries wrote in his diary that when he met Accompong, the Maroon leader wore "an embroidered waistcoat, gold lace around his hat, a silver chain about his neck to which was hung a silver medal wherein." Accompong also had "ear rings, and on each of his fingers...rings of silver," but that he still went barefoot.

== Accompong tries to take over Trelawny Town ==
In the 1760s, the Maroons of Accompong Town played a significant role in suppressing rebellions inspired by Tacky's War in western Jamaica. Captain Quashee, reporting to superintendent John Kelly, and his Maroon warriors captured a number of rebel slaves.

Some historians believe that there were no official records of Accompong after the 1750s. However, there is evidence that Accompong tried to take over Trelawny Town in the mid-1760s.

The treaty of 1739 named Accompong as Cudjoe's successor. When Cudjoe died in 1764, Accompong tried to take control of Trelawny Town. The governor, Roger Hope Elletson, asserted authority over the Leeward Maroons. Elletson instructed Superintendent John James to take the Trelawny Town badge of authority away from Accompong, and to give it to a Trelawny Town Maroon officer named Lewis. James instructed Accompong that he had authority only over Accompong Town.

Accompong seems to have died in the decade that followed. After Cudjoe and Accompong died, control of the Leeward Maroon towns passed to white superintendents, who were appointed by the governor to supervise the Maroon towns. In 1773 it was reported that the white superintendent had appointed Maroon captains Crankey and Muncko as the officers reporting to him in Accompong Town.

== Accompong Town after Accompong ==
Accompong Town's population grew from 85 in 1740 to 119 in 1770, to 159 in 1788.

When the Second Maroon War broke out in 1795, the Maroons of Trelawny Town took up arms against the British colonial authorities, but the Accompong Maroons under the nominal leadership of Maroon Captain John Foster swore allegiance to the British. The Maroons of Accompong Town fought on behalf of the British colonial authorities against Trelawny Town. During this period, the de facto leadership of Accompong Town was held by its white superintendent, Alexander Forbes, who ensured that the Accompong Maroons remained loyal to the British colonial administration.

Accompong Town suffered losses in the Second Maroon War. When Maroon Captain Chambers was sent to Trelawny Town to secure their surrender, Captain James Palmer of Trelawny Town shot him and cut off the Accompong captain's head. Militia colonel William Fitch, newly arrived in Jamaica, ignored the advice of his experienced Maroon trackers. He led his forces into a Trelawny Town ambush; their warriors killed Fitch, many members of the white militia, and a number of Accompong warriors.

During the course of the Second Maroon War, the Maroons of Accompong broke up a longstanding settlement of runaway slaves in the Cockpit Country called the Congo Settlement, which had been formed in the 1770s. Many of the survivors of this community went on to fight on the side of Trelawny Town in the Second Maroon War.

== After the deportation of Trelawny Town ==
Accompong Town backed the winning side. After the Maroons of Trelawny Town were deported to Nova Scotia, the colonial authorities granted Accompong the sole rights to hunt runaway slaves. But the Accompong Maroons were unsuccessful in attempts to disperse or capture the runaway community of Cuffee. Soon the colonial authorities reinstated slave hunting rights to the Windward Maroons.

When Cuffee's group faded from the colonial records, other refugee slaves established a Maroon community in Cockpit Country in 1812. The community of Me-no-Sen-You-no-Come also resisted attempts by the Accompong Maroons and the colonial militias to disperse them in the 1820s.

In 1808, the population of Accompong Town was 238, but it almost doubled to 436 in 1841.

The Accompong Maroons played a significant role in helping the colonial militia of Sir Willoughby Cotton to put down the Christmas Rebellion of 1831–2, also known as the Baptist War, led by Samuel Sharpe.

== Government ==
In two settlements, they set up a traditional form of village government drawn from their Akan (Asante) culture, based on men popularly recognized as leaders. The executive is now called "Colonel-in-Chief", who leads the Maroon Council. These men share executive responsibilities for the community.

=== Maroon officers ===
| Date | Name |
|---|---|
| 1720s–1770s | Captain Accompong |
| c. 1773 | Captain Muncko |
| c. 1773 | Captain Crankey |
| 1790s–1808 | Captain John Foster |
| 1807–? | Major Samuel Smith |

=== White superintendents ===
| Date | Name |
|---|---|
| 1740–c. 1752 | George Currie |
| c. 1760 | John Kelly |
| c. 1764 | John Delaroache |
| c. 1767 | William Delaroache and John Slater |
| c. 1768 | Jeremiah Gardiner |
| 1773–c. 1797 | Alexander Forbes |
| c. 1797–1803/4 | Alexander Forbes junior |
| 1803/4–1805/6 | Obadiah Clements |
| 1805/6–1806/7 | Charles De Bosse |
| 1806/7–1808 | Charles Pight |
| 1808–1813/4 | Edan Mitchell |
| 1813/14–1817 | Hadley D'Oyley Mitchell |
| 1817 | George Rose (d. 1 July 1817) |
| 1817–1819/20 | Joseph Fowkes |
| 1819/20–1826 | Philip Smith |
| c. 1820s | John Hylton |
| 1841 | Thomas Hylton |

== Late 20th century to present ==
Since Jamaica gained independence in 1962, it has recognised the political and cultural rights of Maroons. In the early 21st century, the government has acknowledged these rights in terms of the UN Declaration on the Rights of Indigenous Peoples (2007), including the "right to maintain and strengthen their distinct political, legal, economic, social and cultural institutions." It also acknowledges the "right for self-government in matters relating to local affairs," as well as "ways and means for financing autonomous functions".

In 2009 Ferron Williams was elected as Colonel-in-Chief of Accompong. Williams was elected to a second six-year term in 2015. He appointed Timothy E. McPherson Jr. from Nanny Town, now Moore Town, to consolidate relations across the Maroon communities as part of a collective effort to protect the environment and promote climate change awareness.

In February 2021 Richard Currie was elected Colonel-in-Chief.

== Culture ==
The inhabitants of Accompong share practices and traditions drawn from their Akan (Asante) ancestors of 200–300 years ago. These practices have evolved as the Maroons adapted to local conditions.

Accompong Town converted to Christianity during the Second Maroon War, before eventually embracing Presbyterianism. However, by the 1850s, the traditions of Revival and Pentecostalism grew out of the merging of West African religions with Christianity.

Descendants of the Maroons and friends celebrate annually on 6 January both the birthday of Cudjoe, leader in 1739, and the treaty that granted their autonomy. In 2007, attendees at the festival protested increased bauxite mining, in an effort to protect the environment of their region.

== See also ==
- First Maroon War
- Second Maroon War
