= Second Maroon War =

1795–96 Jamaican slave rebellion

The Second Maroon War
- Part of the Atlantic Revolutions and the Slave Revolts in North America
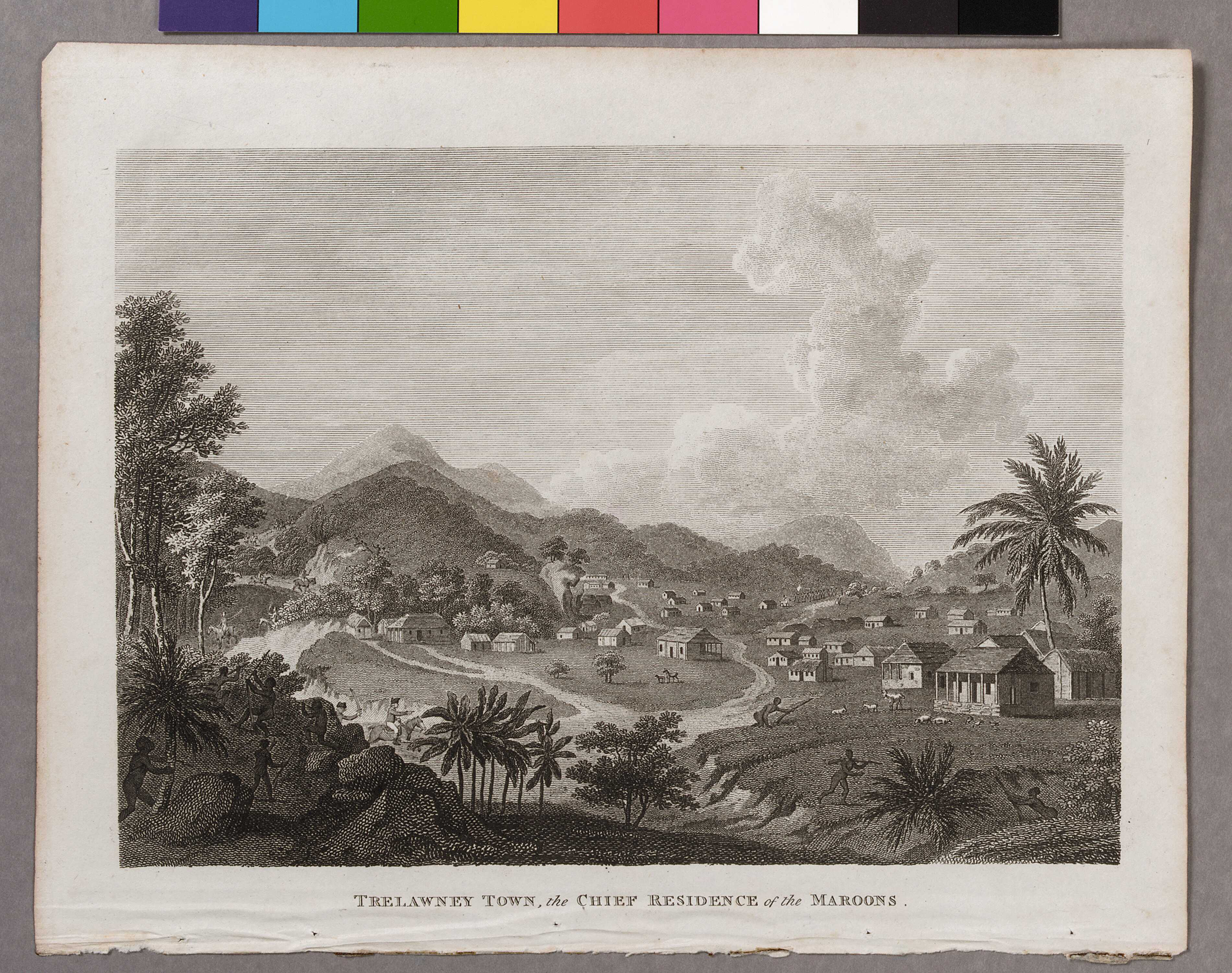
- Illustration of Trelawney Town
| Date | 1795 – 1796 |
| Location | Colony of Jamaica |
| Result | British victory |

Belligerents
| (Kingdom of Great Britain) British Empire: (Kingdom of Great Britain) Colonial militias; Accompong Town | Maroons from Trelawney Town and allies |

Commanders and leaders
| (Kingdom of Great Britain) Earl Balcarres (Kingdom of Great Britain) George Walpole (Kingdom of Great Britain) William Fitch † | Montague James (surrendered); John Jarret (surrendered); Charles Samuels; Andrew Smith; Leonard Parkinson; James Palmer |

Strength
| 5,000 | 150 Maroons, 350 runaway slaves |

Casualties and losses
| At least 65 killed | 21–32 killed |

The Second Maroon War of 1795–1796 was an eight-month conflict between the Maroons of Cudjoe's Town (Trelawny Town), a Maroon settlement later renamed after Governor Edward Trelawny at the end of First Maroon War, located near Trelawny Parish, Jamaica in the St. James Parish, and the British colonials who controlled the island. The Windward communities of Jamaican Maroons remained neutral during this rebellion and their treaty with the British still remains in force. Accompong Town, however, sided with the colonial militias, and fought against Trelawny Town.

== Background ==
The Maroons of Trelawny Town felt that they were being mistreated under the terms of Cudjoe's Treaty of 1739, which ended the First Maroon War. The spark of the war was when two Maroons, one named Peter Campbell, were found guilty of stealing two pigs by a court in Montego Bay. The court then ordered a black slave to flog the two Maroons, and the humiliation provoked outrage in Trelawny Town. For half a century, the Maroons had been hunting runaway slaves, and while Campbell was being whipped, other imprisoned slaves jeered them.

When six Maroon leaders, led by Montague James and including Major Jarrett, came to the British to present their grievances, the British took them as prisoners. They were acting under orders from the new governor, Alexander Lindsay, 6th Earl of Balcarres, who wrongly believed that the French had infected the Maroons with their revolutionary spirit. Balcarres completely mishandled the dispute, which could have been resolved without conflict, but he ignored the advice of local planters, and ordered his forces to put down the Maroons of Trelawny Town. Fighting began in mid-August.

== The war ==
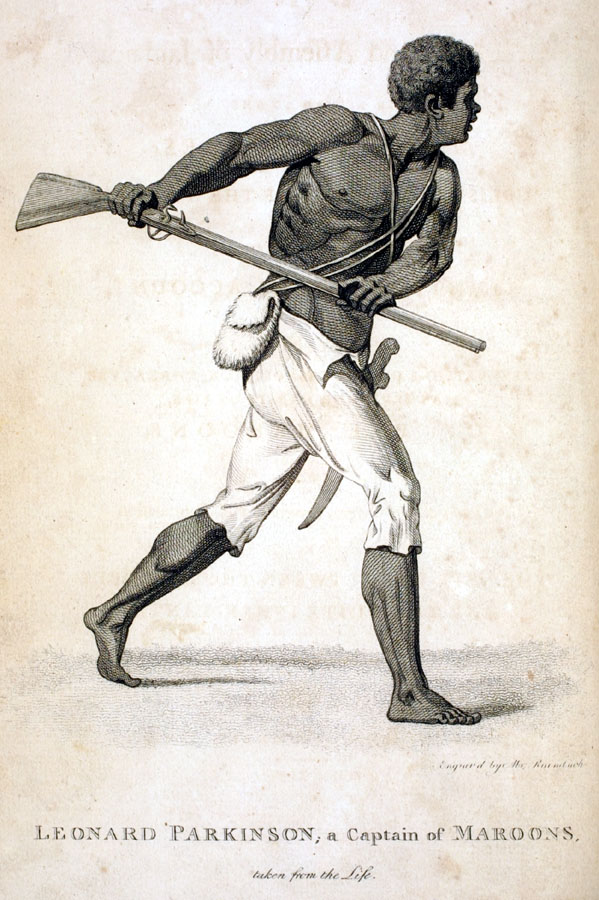
"Leonard Parkinson, A Captain of the Maroons; taken from the Life" 1796 by Abraham Raimbach

The governor's combative approach led to a minor issue being blown up into a full-scale guerrilla war. On the other hand, Trelawny Town did not receive any support from the Windward Maroon towns of Moore Town, Charles Town (Jamaica) and Scott's Hall, Jamaica, while the other Leeward Maroon town of Accompong Town even took up arms on behalf of the colonial authorities against Trelawny Town.

The war lasted for eight months and ended in a bloody stalemate. The British fielded 5,000 troops and militia, which outnumbered the Maroons ten to one, but the mountainous and forested topography of Jamaica proved ideal for guerrilla warfare. The Maroon officers who fought a guerrilla campaign against the British included Leonard Parkinson, James Palmer, Andrew Smith (Maroon), John Jarrett, and Charles Samuels (Maroon). Alexander Forbes, the white superintendent of Accompong Town, sent an Accompong Maroon officer, Captain Chambers, to Trelawny Town to persuade them to surrender, but Palmer shot Chambers and cut off his head. Colonel William Fitch mobilised his forces, which included Accompong warriors, to attack Trelawny Town. However, Fitch did not follow the advice of his Accompong trackers, and he led them into a Trelawny ambush, which resulted in 18 deaths, including those of two Accompong trackers. Fitch himself was killed in a Maroon ambush.

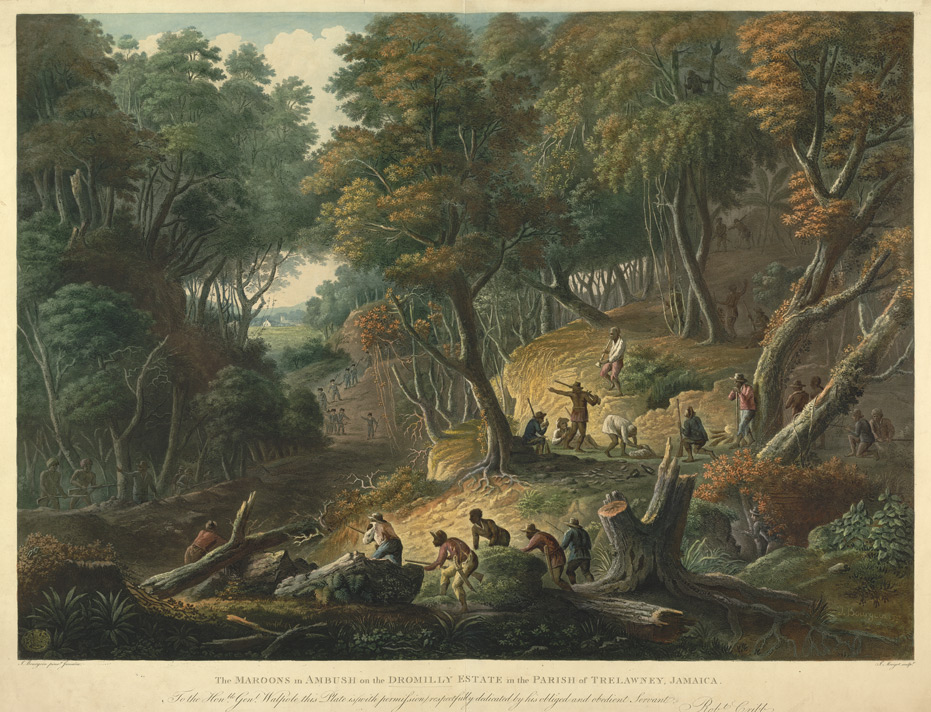
The Maroons utilized their knowledge of the terrain to wage a guerilla war against the British colonial government

In the first two weeks of the conflict, the Maroons of Trelawny Town had killed 65 British soldiers without any Maroon death reported. Throughout the entire conflict, one general complained that the colonial forces had killed less than 32 Maroons and their allies. Recent research shows that the colonial militias were only able to kill about 21 Trelawnys. The Maroon warriors also laid waste to a number of sugar estates in western Jamaica.

The casualties suffered by the colonial militias were higher than those suffered by the Maroons. There were a number of engagements between the Maroons and the British forces for the remaining months of 1795, during which the British suffered between 8-12 killed or wounded in each skirmish. No final figure was given for the total losses for the British. However, the British casualties were believed to be in the hundreds.

When General George Walpole employed a scorched-earth strategy against Trelawny Town, the Maroons found they had difficulty getting access to food, water, and ammunition as the dry season began at the end of the year. When Governor Balcarres imported some one hundred bloodhounds and their handlers from Cuba, Montague James and his lieutenants saw this as the last straw, and accepted Walpole's overtures for peace. The Maroons had the better of the skirmishes, so they only laid down their arms and surrendered in December 1795 on condition they would not be deported. Walpole gave the Maroons his word that they would not be transported off the island.

== Aftermath ==
The treaty signed in December between Walpole and the Maroon leaders established that the Maroons would beg on their knees for the King's forgiveness, return all runaway slaves, and be relocated elsewhere in Jamaica. The governor of Jamaica ratified the treaty, but gave the Maroons only three days to present themselves to beg forgiveness on 1 January 1796. Suspicious of British intentions, most of the Maroons did not surrender until mid-March, by which time the conflict had proved to be very costly to the island, and resulted in the ruin of many plantations and estates. Balcarres used the contrived breach of treaty as a pretext to deport most of the Trelawny Town Maroons to Nova Scotia. Walpole was disgusted with the governor's actions, pointing out that he had given the Maroons his word that they would not be transported off the island. Walpole resigned his commission, and went back to England, where he became an MP and protested in vain in the House of Commons how Balcarres had behaved in a duplicitous and dishonest way with the Maroons. However, Secretary of War Henry Dundas, 1st Viscount Melville, supported the governor's decision to deport the Maroons.

In 1796, about 581 Trelawny Maroons were transported to Nova Scotia, but another 58 stayed behind in Jamaica, and either forged careers as free persons of colour, or joined Accompong Town. During the ship's voyage 17 Maroons died. During the first winter between 1796 and 1797, which was a bitter one, another 19 Maroons died. During this winter, another five Maroons were born, and in 1797 the surgeon John Oxley counted 550 Maroons in Nova Scotia. After a few years the Maroons were upset with the poor accommodation in Canada. Led by Montague James, the Maroons asked to be transported to the new British settlement of Sierra Leone in West Africa. The British government eventually agreed, and the Maroons travelled to Freetown at the start of the nineteenth century. Palmer died within a month of arriving with the Jamaican Maroons in Sierra Leone.

After slavery was abolished in 1838, the Jamaican colonial authorities imported labourers from Sierra Leone, and among that number were scores of Trelawny Town Maroons. Among those who returned was Peter Campbell, whose flogging had sparked the Second Maroon War. These Returned Maroons established themselves in nearby Flagstaff, and their descendants are still there today.

== Runaways fighting for Trelawny Town ==
Hundreds of runaway slaves secured their freedom by escaping and fighting alongside the Maroons of Trelawny Town. The runaways fighting on the side of Trelawny Town may have outnumbered the Trelawny Maroons warriors. About half of these runaways surrendered with the Maroons, and many were executed or re-sold in slavery to Cuba.

However, a few hundred stayed out in the forests of the Cockpit Country, and they joined other unofficial maroon communities. In 1798, a slave named Cuffee ran away from a western estate, and established a runaway community which was able to resist attempts by the colonial forces and the official Maroons remaining in Jamaica to subdue them.
