= George Walpole (British Army officer) =

British Army officer and politician

The Honourable George Walpole

Joint Under-Secretary of State for Foreign Affairs
- In office 1806–1807
- Monarch: George III
- Prime Minister: The Lord Grenville
- Preceded by: Robert Ward
- Succeeded by: Viscount FitzHarris

Personal details
- Born: 20 June 1758
- Died: May 1835 (aged 76)

Colonel George Walpole (20 June 1758 – May 1835) was a British Army officer and politician. He gained distinction after participating in the Second Maroon War in 1795. After entering Parliament in 1797, he served as Under-Secretary of State for Foreign Affairs from 1806 to 1807 in the Ministry of All the Talents headed by Lord Grenville.

== Early life and education ==
Walpole was the third son of Horatio Walpole, 1st Earl of Orford, by Lady Rachel Cavendish (d. 1805), third daughter of William Cavendish, 3rd Duke of Devonshire. Horatio Walpole, 1st Baron Walpole, was his grandfather.

He was educated at Eton from 1769 to 1776.

== Military career ==
Walpole was commissioned as cornet in the 12th Light Dragoons on 12 May 1777, and became lieutenant in the 9th Dragoons on 17 April 1780. He returned to the 12th Light Dragoons as captain-lieutenant on 10 December 1781, and exchanged to the 8th Light Dragoons on 13 August 1782. On 25 June 1785 he obtained a majority in the 13th Light Dragoons, and became lieutenant-colonel of that regiment on 31 October 1792.

=== Maroon insurrection in Jamaica, 1795 ===
In 1795 Walpole went with the 13th Light Dragoons to the West Indies, and took a leading part in the suppression of an insurrection by Maroons in Jamaica. The Maroons of Cudjoe's Town (Trelawny Town), who had risen in what became known as the Second Maroon War, numbered fewer than seven hundred, but they had been joined by about four hundred runaway slaves, and the insurrection threatened to spread. The country was extremely difficult for regular troops, and two of the detachments sent against the Jamaican Maroons fell into ambushes, and their commanders (Colonels Sandford and William Fitch) were killed. At the beginning of October Walpole was charged with the general conduct of the operations, and the governor – Lord Balcarres – gave him the local and temporary rank of major-general. By skilful dispositions he captured several of the maroon "cockpits" or stockades. On 24 October the governor wrote to the secretary of state: "General Walpole is going on vastly well. His figure and talents are well adapted for the service he is upon, and he has got the confidence of the militia and the country." Walpole secured the support of the Maroons of Accompong Town against their Leeward Maroon brethren of Trelawny Town) in September 1795, and the Accompong Maroons trained them in the art of tracking in the forested regions of the Cockpit Country.

However, the Maroons of Trelawny Town were unable to maintain their guerrilla campaign during the drought months, and when Walpole employed a scorched-earth policy, backed up by the importation of hunting dogs, on 22 December Walpole was able to persuade the Trelawny Maroon leader, Montague James, to come to terms. They were to ask pardon, to leave their fastnesses and settle in any district assigned to them, and to give up the runaway slaves. However, the Maroons did not betray their runaway slave allies, and hundreds of them gained their freedom as a result. On these conditions he promised that they should not be sent out of the island; and the terms were ratified by the governor. Only a few of the insurgents came in, and in the middle of January Walpole moved against them with a strong column, accompanied by dogs which had been brought from Cuba. They then surrendered, and were sent down to Montego Bay; and in March the assembly and the governor decided to ship them to Nova Scotia. Walpole strongly remonstrated against what he regarded as a breach of faith. He argued that the treaty might have been cancelled when the maroons failed to fulfil its terms, but that the governor had deliberately abstained from cancelling it. He declined a gift of five hundred guineas which the assembly voted for the purchase of a sword, and obtained leave to return to England. His letter declining the sword was expunged from the minutes of the house (cf. Dallas, Hist. of the Maroons, 1803; Gardner, Hist. of Jamaica, 1873, pp. 232–6). He was made colonel in the British Army on 3 May 1796, but retired from the service in the following year.

== Political career ==
In January 1797 Walpole was returned to Parliament for Derby, which he represented till 1806. Walpole maintained contact with the Trelawny Maroons while they were in Nova Scotia, arguing in vain in parliament that they were unfairly treated by Balcarres. When Montague James complained of poor living conditions in Nova Scotia, he sent one of his junior Maroon officers, Charles Samuels (Maroon) to England, bearing letters from the Maroon colonel.

He was a follower of Charles James Fox, and voted for reform. He was George Tierney's second in his duel with Pitt on Putney Heath on 27 May 1798. When Fox came into office as Foreign Secretary, Walpole was appointed Under-Secretary of State for Foreign Affairs (20 February 1806); but he did not retain this office long after Fox's death. He was made comptroller of cash in the excise office for the rest of his life. He was MP for Dungarvan from 1807 till 1820, when he resigned his seat.

Walpole spoke against the slave trade in the House of Commons in 1807, during the Slave Trade Act 1807 approval. Relying on his knowledge of the Maroon resistance, he supported the argument that the increasing number of Africans in the colony would inevitably result in revolts and even revolutions like the, then recent, Haitian Revolution.

== Personal life ==
Walpole fathered a child with a Maroon woman while in Jamaican. His daughter Mary Walpole was born in 1796.

Walpole lived at 14, Queen Street, Mayfair, London. He died in May 1835, aged 76, unmarried.

Parliament of Great Britain
Preceded by Lord George Cavendish; Edward Coke	Member of Parliament for Derby; 1797–1801; With: Edward Coke	Succeeded by Parliament of the United Kingdom
Parliament of the United Kingdom
Preceded by Parliament of Great Britain	Member of Parliament for Derby; 1801–1806; With: Edward Coke	Succeeded by Edward Coke; William Cavendish
Preceded by William Greene	Member of Parliament for Dungarvan; 1807–1820	Succeeded by Augustus Clifford
Political offices
Preceded by Robert Ward	Joint Under-Secretary of State for Foreign Affairs (with Sir Francis Vincent); 1806–1807	Succeeded by Viscount FitzHarris
