= Colony of Jamaica =

British crown colony in the Caribbean (1655–1962)

Coordinates: 17.9833°N 76.8000°W

Crown Colony of Jamaica and Dependencies
- 1655–1962
- Flag (1957–1962) Badge (1957–1962)
- Motto: Indus Uterque Serviet Uni "The two Indies will serve as one"
- Anthem: God Save the Queen (1837–1901; 1952–1962); God Save the King (1745–1837; 1901–1952)
- Status: Colony of England (1655–1707); Colony of Great Britain (1707–1800); Colony of the United Kingdom (1801–1962) (Note: Including both the United Kingdom of Great Britain and Ireland (1801–1922) and the United Kingdom of Great Britain and Northern Ireland (1922–1962))
- Capital: Spanish Town (1655–1872); Port Royal (de facto, 1655–1692); Kingston (1872–1962)
- Common languages: English, Jamaican Patois, Spanish, Scottish Gaelic, Scots, Irish,
- Ethnic groups: Afro-Jamaican, Multiracial, European, Indian, Chinese, Arab, Jewish
- Religion: Christianity, Rastafari, Akan religion, Judaism
- Government: Vicegerency under a parliamentary republic (1655–1660); Viceroyalty under a constitutional monarchy (1660–1962)
- Head of State
  - 1655–1658: Lord Protector Oliver Cromwell
  - 1952–1962: Queen Elizabeth II
- Governor
  - 1655: William Penn
  - 1957–1962: Sir Kenneth Blackburne
- Chief Minister
  - 1953–1955: Alexander Bustamante
  - 1955–1962: Norman Manley
- Legislature: Parliament
  - Upper house: Legislative Council
  - Lower house: House of Representatives
- History
  - Established: 10 May 1655
  - Attachment of Bay Islands British Honduras Cayman Islands Turks and Caicos: 15 June 1852; 1749; 18 July 1670; 4 April 1873
  - Detachment of Bay Islands British Honduras Cayman Islands Turks and Caicos: 14 July 1860; 2 October 1884; 4 July 1959; 4 July 1959
  - Independence: 6 August 1962

Population
  - 1943: 1,249,900
  - 1956: 1,577,410
- Currency: Spanish dollar (1655–1840); Jamaican pound (1840–1962); British West Indies dollar (1954–1962)
Preceded by
Spanish Jamaica
Spanish West Indies
Captaincy General of Guatemala
Turks and Caicos Islands
Succeeded by
Jamaica
Cayman Islands
Bay Islands
British Honduras
Turks and Caicos Islands

The Crown Colony of Jamaica and Dependencies was a Crown colony of the British Empire from 1655 to 1962. English forces launched an invasion of Jamaica in 1655, capturing the existing Spanish colony. Jamaica was primarily used for exporting sugarcane from plantations operated by African slaves, and experienced several rebellions over the course of British rule. The colony was granted independence in 1962.

== History ==
=== 17th century ===
==== English conquest ====
In late 1654, English leader Oliver Cromwell launched the Western Design armada against Spain's colonies in the Caribbean. In April 1655, General Robert Venables led the armada in an attack on Spain's fort at Santo Domingo, Hispaniola. However, the Spanish repulsed this poorly-executed attack, known as the Siege of Santo Domingo, and the English troops were soon decimated by disease, injured badly or possibly killed.

Weakened by fever and looking for an easy victory following their defeat at Santo Domingo, the English force then sailed for Jamaica, the only Spanish West Indies island that did not have new defensive works. Spanish Jamaica had been a colony of Spain for over a hundred years. In May 1655, around 7,000 English soldiers landed near Jamaica's Spanish Town capital. The English invasion force soon overwhelmed the small number of Spanish troops (at the time, Jamaica's entire population numbered only around 2,500).

In the following years, Spain repeatedly attempted to recapture Jamaica, and in response in 1657 the English Governor of Jamaica invited buccaneers to base themselves at Port Royal on Jamaica, to help defend against Spanish attacks. Spain never recaptured Jamaica, losing the Battle of Ocho Rios in 1657 and the Battle of Rio Nuevo in 1658. Governor Edward D'Oyley succeeded in persuading one of the leaders of the Spanish Maroons, Juan de Bolas, to switch sides and join the English along with his Maroon warriors. In 1660, when Don Cristobal de Ysasi realised that de Bolas had joined the English, he admitted that the Spanish no longer had a chance of recapturing the island, since de Bolas and his men knew the mountainous interior better than the Spanish and the English. Ysasi gave up on his dreams, and fled to Cuba.

For England, Jamaica was to be the 'dagger pointed at the heart of the Spanish Empire,' although in fact it was a possession of little economic value then.

==== Early English colonisation ====
Cromwell's Protectorate increased the island's white population by sending indentured servants and prisoners captured in battles with the Irish and Scots, as well as some common criminals.

This practice was continued after the restoration of Charles II, and the white population was also augmented by immigrants from the North American mainland and other islands, as well as by the English buccaneers. But tropical diseases kept the number of whites well under 10,000 until about 1740. The white population increased, through migration from Britain, to 80,000 in the 1780s.

Although the slave population in the 1670s and 1680s never exceeded roughly 9,500, by the end of the seventeenth century importing slaves from Africa increased the black population to at least three times the number of whites.

Beginning with the Stuart monarchy's appointment of a civil governor to Jamaica in 1661, political patterns were established that lasted well into the twentieth century. The second governor, Lord Windsor, brought with him

in 1662 a proclamation from the king giving Jamaica's non-slave populace the rights of English citizens, including the right to make their own laws. Although he spent only ten weeks in Jamaica, Lord Windsor laid the foundations of a governing system that was to last for two centuries: a Crown-appointed governor acting with the advice of a nominated council in the legislature. The legislature consisted of the governor and an elected but highly unrepresentative House of Assembly.

England gained formal possession of Jamaica from Spain in 1670 through the Treaty of Madrid. Removing the pressing need for constant defence against Spanish attack, this change served as an incentive to planting. For years, however, the planter-dominated Jamaica House of Assembly was in continual conflict with the various governors and the Stuart kings; there were also contentious factions within the assembly itself. For much of the 1670s and 1680s, Charles II and James II and the assembly feuded over such matters as the purchase of slaves from ships not run by the royal English trading company.

In 1687, James II appointed the Duke of Albemarle as Governor, who pursued a policy of excluding the planter oligarchy from state offices. After the duke's death in 1688, the planters, who had fled Jamaica to London, succeeded in lobbying James II to order a return to the pre-Albemarle political arrangement and the revolution that brought William III and Mary to the throne in 1689 confirmed the local control of Jamaican planters belonging to the Assembly.

This settlement also improved the supply of slaves and resulted in more protection, including military support, for the planters against foreign competition. This was of particular importance during the Anglo-French War in the Caribbean from 1689 to 1713. However, even though the Spaniards no longer threatened Jamaica, the early English settlers had to ward off attacks from the French. In 1694, Jean-Baptiste du Casse led a force of three warships and 29 transport ships that landed at Port Morant in eastern Jamaica, where they burnt plantations, destroyed over 50 sugar-works, kidnapped hundreds of slaves, and killed and tortured many white colonists. Du Casse then sailed down the southern coast, eventually landing at Carlisle Bay, with the object of marching on to Spanish Town. However, a militia company of planters and their slaves defeated du Casse, who then destroyed Carlisle Bay, and withdrew to St Domingue.

==== Maroons ====
When the English captured Jamaica in 1655, the Spanish colonists fled. Since 1512, though slavery was forbidden due to the laws of Burgos there were no more than 400 African "free" workers living in the island. These former Spanish citizens created three Palenques, or settlements. Former citizens organised under the leadership of Juan de Serras allied with the Spanish guerrillas on the western end of the Cockpit Country, while those under Juan de Bolas established themselves in modern-day Clarendon Parish, Jamaica and served as a "black militia" for the English. The third chose to join those who had previously escaped from the Spanish to live and intermarry with the Arawak people. Each group of Jamaican Maroons established distinct communities of Free black people in Jamaica in the mountainous interior. They survived by subsistence farming and periodic raids of plantations. Over time, the Maroons came to control large areas of the Jamaican interior.

In the second half of the seventeenth century, de Serras fought regular campaigns against the English forces, even attacking the capital of Spanish Town, and he was never defeated by the English. In the early eighteenth century, Maroon forces frequently defeated the British in small-scale skirmishes. In response, the British colonial authorities dispatched the colonial militia to attack them, but the Maroons successfully fought a guerrilla campaign against them in the mountainous interior, and forced the colonial authorities to seek peace terms to end the expensive conflict.

In the early eighteenth century, English-speaking escaped Asante slaves (hailing originally from West Africa, specifically Ghana) were at the forefront of the Maroon fighting against the British. Cudjoe (or "Kojo" in the original Akan) led the Leeward Maroons in western Jamaica, while Quao (or "Yaw" in the original Akan) and Queen Nanny were the leaders of the Windward Maroons in the Blue Mountains of eastern Jamaica. The rebellion finally ended, however, with the signing of peace agreements in 1739 and 1740.

White planters later tried to sow seeds of division among Maroon communities by pressuring them to re-capture any escaped slaves, and to protect British property in exchange for no longer being attacked by British forces. Although a small faction of the Maroons of Trelawny Town accepted these conditions (and were later re-captured and sold back into slavery, to be shipped off to Cuba and the American state of Georgia), overwhelmingly Maroon communities remained bastions of hope and freedom for escapees. Maroon warfare and continued successful attacks on plantations continued to serve as a driving force behind Britain's decision to emancipate the colony of Jamaica in later years.

==== Jamaica's pirate economy ====
Spanish resistance continued for some years after the English conquest, in some cases with the help of the Jamaican Maroons, but Spain never succeeded in retaking the island. The English established their main coastal town at Port Royal. Under early English rule, Jamaica became a haven of privateers, buccaneers, and occasionally outright pirates: Christopher Myngs, Edward Mansvelt, and most famously, Henry Morgan.

In addition to being unable to retake their land, Spain was no longer able to provide their colonies in the New World with manufactured goods on a regular basis. The progressive irregularity of annual Spanish fleets, combined with an increasing desperation by colonies for manufactured goods, allowed Port Royal to flourish and by 1659, two hundred houses, shops, and warehouses surrounded the fort. Merchants and privateers worked together in what is now referred to as "forced trade." Merchants would sponsor trading endeavors with the Spanish while sponsoring privateers to attack Spanish ships and rob Spanish coastal towns.

While the merchants most certainly had the upper hand, the privateers were an integral part of the operation. Nuala Zahedieh, a lecturer at the University of Edinburgh, wrote, "Both opponents and advocates of so-called 'forced trade' declared the town’s fortune had the dubious distinction of being founded entirely on the servicing of the privateers' needs and highly lucrative trade in prize commodities." She added, "A report that the 300 men who accompanied Henry Morgan to Portobello in 1668 returned to the town with a prize to spend of at least £60 each (two or three times the usual annual plantation wage) leaves little doubt that they were right".

The forced trade became almost a way of life in Port Royal. Michael Pawson and David Busseret wrote "...one way or the other nearly all the propertied inhabitants of Port Royal seem to have an interest in privateering." Forced trade was rapidly making Port Royal one of the wealthiest communities in the English territories of North America, far surpassing any profit made from the production of sugarcane. Zahedieh wrote, "The Portobello raid [in 1668] alone produced plunder worth £75,000, more than seven times the annual value of the island’s sugar exports, which at Port Royal prices did not exceed £10,000 at this time."

However, many successful privateers and buccaneers became integrally involved in the growing sugar industry, human trafficking, and the acquisition of large numbers of enslaved Africans. In the 1670s and 1680s, in his capacity as an owner of a large population of humans he kept enslaved, Morgan led three campaigns against the Jamaican Maroons of Juan de Serras. Morgan achieved some success against the Maroons, who withdrew further into the Blue Mountains, where they were able to stay out of the reach of Morgan and his forces.

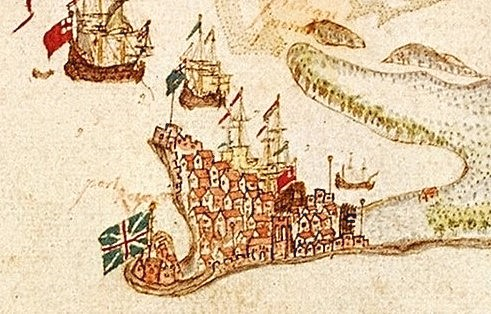
An illustration of pre-1692 Port Royal

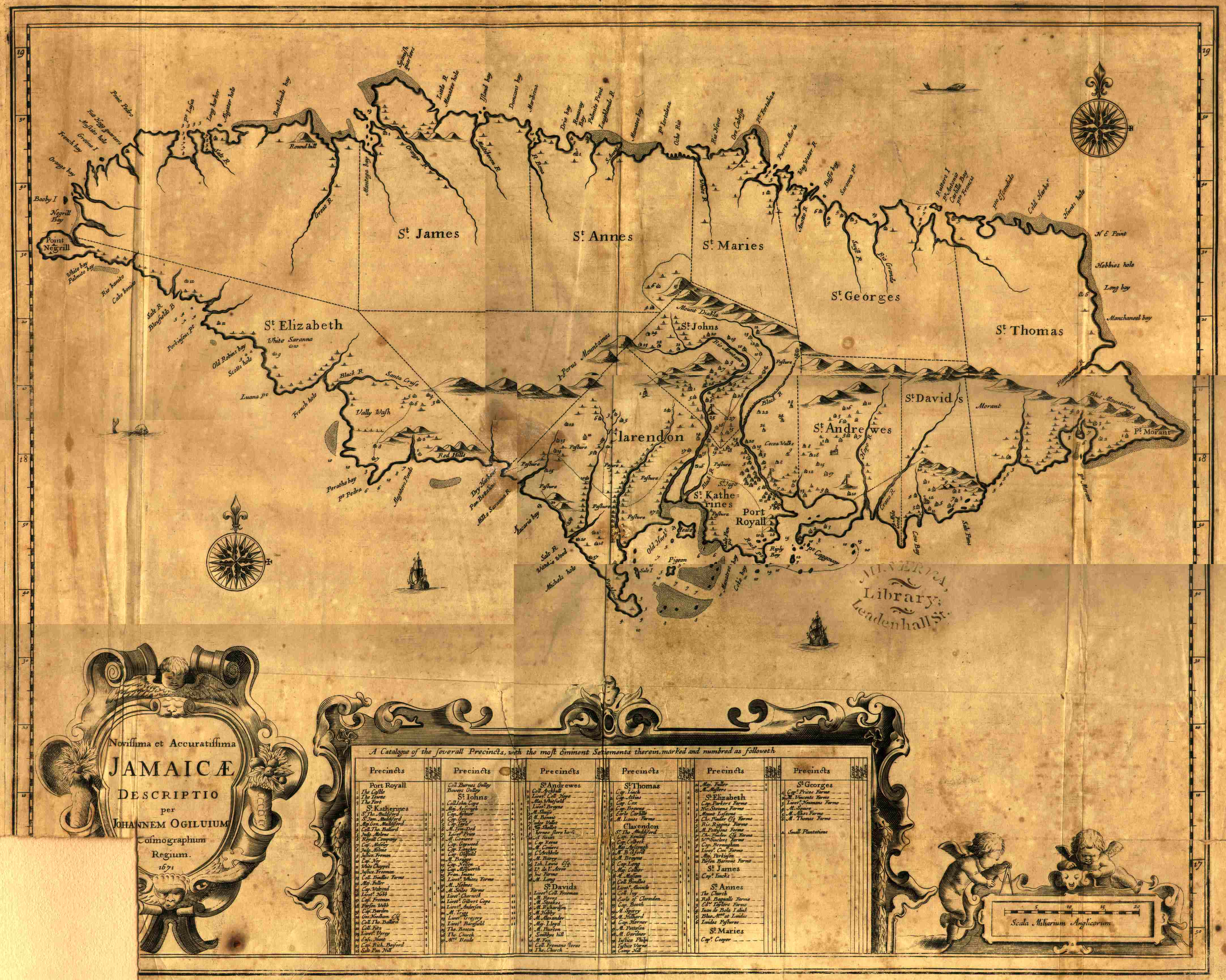
English map of Jamaica from the 1670s

European colonies in the Caribbean during the 18th century

==== 1692 earthquake and the collapse of Port Royal ====
On 7 June 1692, a violent earthquake struck Port Royal. Two-thirds of the town sank into the sea immediately after the main shock. According to Robert Renny in his 'An History of Jamaica' (1807): "All the wharves sunk at once, and in the space of two minutes, nine-tenths of the city were covered with water, which was raised to such a height, that it entered the uppermost rooms of the few houses which were left standing. The tops of the highest houses, were visible in the water, and surrounded by the masts of vessels, which had been sunk along with them." Before the earthquake, the town consisted of 6,500 inhabitants living in about 2,000 buildings, many constructed of brick and with more than one storey, and all built on loose sand. During the shaking, the sand liquefied and the buildings, along with their occupants, appeared to flow into the sea.

In the immediate aftermath of the earthquake, it was common to ascribe the destruction to divine retribution on the people of Port Royal for their sinful ways. Members of the Jamaica Council declared: "We are become by this an instance of God Almighty's severe judgement." This view of the disaster was not confined to Jamaica; in Boston, the Reverend Cotton Mather said in a letter to his uncle: "Behold, an accident speaking to all our English America." After the earthquake, the town was partially rebuilt. But the colonial government was relocated to Spanish Town, which had been the capital under Spanish rule. Port Royal was devastated by a fire in 1703 and a hurricane in 1722. Most of the sea trade moved to Kingston. By the late 18th century, Port Royal was largely abandoned.

=== 18th century ===
==== Jamaica's sugar boom ====
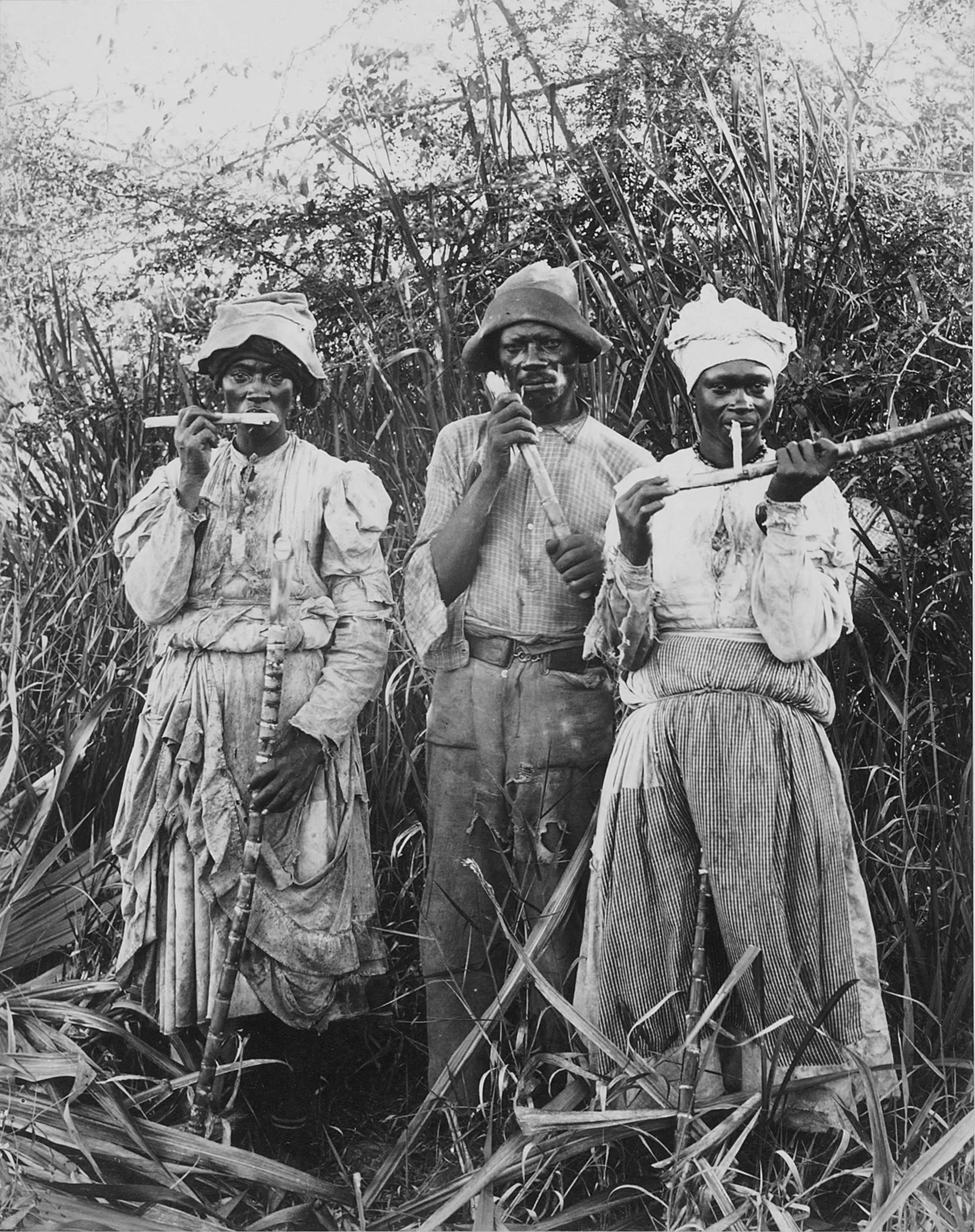
Sugar cane cutters in Jamaica, 1880

In the mid-17th century, sugarcane had been brought into the English West Indies by the Dutch, from Brazil. Upon landing in Jamaica and other islands, they quickly urged local growers to change their main crops from cotton and tobacco to sugar cane. With depressed prices of cotton and tobacco, due mainly to stiff competition from the North American colonies, the farmers switched, leading to a boom in the Caribbean economies. Sugar was rapidly becoming more popular in Britain, where it was used in cakes and to sweeten teas. In the eighteenth century, sugar replaced piracy as Jamaica's main source of income and Jamaica became the largest exporter of sugar in the British Empire. Sugar became Britain's largest import by the late eighteenth century.

The sugar monoculture and slave-worked plantation society spread across Jamaica throughout the eighteenth century. The sugar industry was labour-intensive and the English brought hundreds of thousands of enslaved Africans to Jamaica. In 1673, there were only 57 sugar estates in Jamaica, but by 1739, the number of sugar plantations grew to 430. By 1832, the median-size plantation in Jamaica had about 150 slaves, and nearly one of every four bondsmen lived on units that had at least 250 slaves.

Jamaica eventually became one of Britain's most valuable colonies during the 18th century. During the Seven Years' War of 1756–63, the British government sought to protect Jamaica from a possible French invasion. In 1760, at the height of the war, there were 16 warships stationed in Jamaica, compared to 18 in the Leeward Islands, and only 19 vessels assigned to the whole of the North American continent.

Simon Taylor, who owned estates in the Jamaican parishes of St Thomas and St Mary, was one of the wealthiest men in the British Empire in the late eighteenth and early nineteenth centuries. During the eighteenth century, those men who survived tropical diseases, were, on average, 50 times wealthier than those who resided in the British Isles. Other notable planters in Jamaica who became wealthy as a result of owning slave plantations included Peter Beckford, Francis Price and Charles Ellis.

==== Growth of slavery ====
The oppression of the enslaved Africans in Jamaica was considered by contemporaries to be amongst the most brutal in the world. Punishments heaped on enslaved African populations by white enslavers included forcing one enslaved person to defecate in the mouth of another enslaved person and then gagging the victim for several hours and forcing them to swallow it (a practice known as Derby's Dose), floggings, whippings to the point of loss of life, "pickling" which was whipping a person until there were open wounds and then placing the victim in a vat of salt and banana peppers (another part of Derby's Dose), hanging by the feet, gang rape, branding on the forehead, and more.

In 1739, Charles Leslie wrote that, "No Country excels [Jamaica] in a barbarous Treatment of Slaves, or in the cruel Methods they put them to Death."

Jamaica's Black African population did not increase significantly in number until well into the eighteenth century, in part because the slave ships coming from the west coast of Africa preferred to first unload at the islands of the Eastern Caribbean.

In 1673, there were nearly 8,000 white colonisers in Jamaica, and over 9,000 Africans kept in slavery. By 1690, that margin increased to 10,000 white colonisers and 30,000 Africans kept enslaved. At the beginning of the eighteenth century, the number of enslaved Africans in Jamaica did not exceed 45,000, but by 1713, the white population had declined to an estimated 7,000, while there were 55,000 enslaved Africans on the island. The population of enslaved Africans rose to about 75,000 in 1730, and passed the 100,000 mark in the 1740s. In 1778, the population of enslaved Africans passed 200,000, and by 1800 it had increased to over 300,000.

The oppression of free slaves increased during the early 18th century. In 1724, an English planter named William Brodrick insulted Francis Williams (poet), who also ran a school for the children of Free black people in Jamaica. Brodrick called him a "black dog", whereupon Williams reacted by calling Brodrick a "white dog" several times. Brodrick punched Williams, as a result of which his "mouth was bloody", but Williams retaliated, after which Brodrick's "shirt and neckcloth had been tore (sic) by the said Williams". Williams insisted that since he was a free black man, he could not be tried for assault, as would have been the case with black slaves who hit a white man, because he was defending himself.

The Assembly, which comprised elected white enslavers, was alarmed at the success with which Williams argued his case, and secured the dismissal of Brodrick's attempts to prosecute him. Complaining that "Williams's behaviour is of great encouragement to the negroes of the island in general", the Assembly then decided to "bring in a bill to reduce the said Francis Williams to the state of other free negroes in this island". This legislation made it illegal for any black person in Jamaica to strike a white person, even in self-defence.

After slavery was abolished in the 1830s, sugar plantations used a variety of forms of labour including workers imported from India under contracts of indenture.

==== First Maroon War ====
Starting in the late seventeenth century, there were periodic skirmishes between the colonial militia and the Windward Maroons, alongside occasional slave revolts. In 1673 one such revolt in St. Ann's Parish of 200 enslaved Africans created the separate group of Leeward Maroons. These Maroons united with a group of Madagascars who had survived the shipwreck of a slave ship and formed their own maroon community in St. George's parish. Several more rebellions strengthened the numbers of this Leeward group. Notably, in 1690 a revolt at Sutton's plantation in Clarendon freed 400 enslaved Africans, who then joined and strengthened the Leeward Maroons. The Leeward Maroons inhabited "cockpits," caves, or deep ravines that were easily defended, even against troops with superior firepower. Such guerrilla warfare and the use of scouts, who blew the abeng (the cow horn, which was used as a trumpet) to warn of approaching militiamen, allowed the Maroons to evade, thwart, frustrate, and defeat any expeditions sent against them.

In 1728, the British authorities sent Robert Hunter to assume the office of governor of Jamaica; Hunter's arrival led to an intensification of the conflict. However, despite increased numbers, the British colonial authorities were unable to defeat the Windward Maroons. By 1739, the colonial authorities recognised that they could not defeat the Maroons, so they offered them treaties of peace instead. In the same year, the colonial authorities, led by Governor Edward Trelawny, sued for peace with the Leeward Maroon leader, Cudjoe, described by Jamaican planters as a short, almost dwarf-like man who for years fought skilfully and bravely to maintain his people's independence. Some writers maintain that during the conflict, Cudjoe became increasingly disillusioned, and quarrelled with his lieutenants and with other Maroon groups. He felt that the only hope for the future was a peace treaty with the enemy which recognized the independence of the Leeward Maroons. In 1742, Cudjoe had to suppress a rebellion of Leeward Maroons against the treaty.

In 1740, the even more rebellious Windward Maroons of the Blue Mountains also agreed to sign a treaty under pressure from both white Jamaicans and the Leeward Maroons. In exchange for securing their freedom, the Maroons were asked to agree not to harbour new runaway slaves, but rather to help catch them. This last clause in the treaty naturally caused a split between the Maroons and the rest of the black population, although from time to time runaways from the plantations still found their way into new maroon settlements, such as those run by Three Fingered Jack (Jamaica). Another provision of the agreement was that the Maroons would serve to protect the island from invaders. The latter was because the Maroons were revered by the British as skilled warriors.

Following the peace treaties of 1739–1740, virgin land was opened up to settlement, and Jamaica's economy flourished in the period of peace that followed. Five official Maroon towns were established in the aftermath of the treaties – Accompong; Cudjoe's Town (Trelawny Town); Nanny Town, later known as Moore Town, Scott's Hall (Jamaica), and Charles Town, Jamaica, living under their own rulers and a British supervisor known as a superintendent.

==== Tacky's Revolt ====
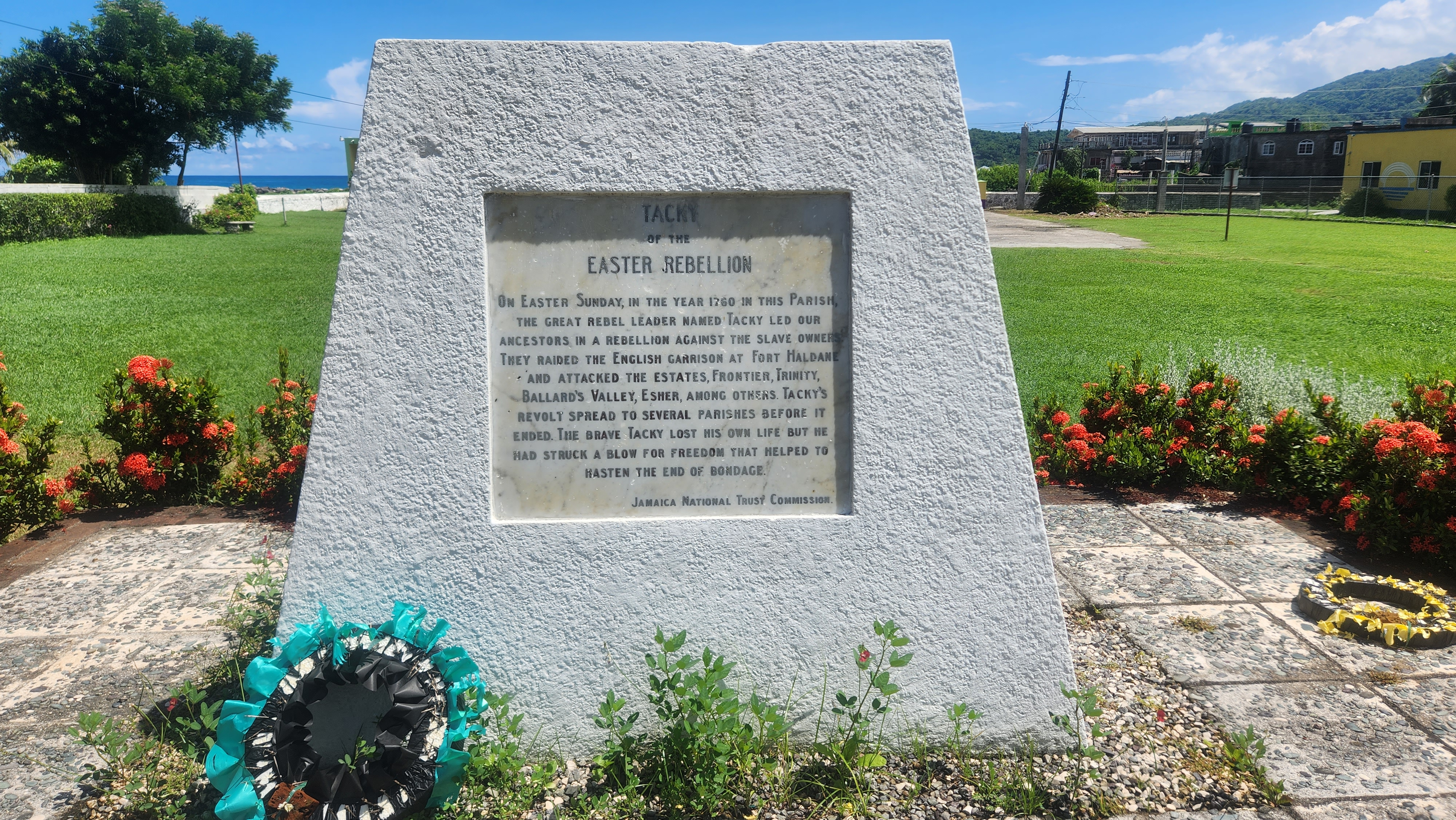
Easter Rebellion memorial 20231007 120611

Among the population of Africans trafficked for slavery, one was named Ancoma. In the 1750s, one captive named Ancoma escaped and formed a community made up of other escaped captives in what is now known as Saint Thomas Parish. In 1759, Ancoma was eventually killed by a Maroon woman and another woman, both his captives. However, his community continued to thrive, and probably formed the basis of the community of Jack Mansong later that century.

The colony's enslaved Africans, who outnumbered their white captors by a ratio of 20:1 in 1800, mounted over a dozen major slave conspiracies (the majority of which were organised by Coromantins), and uprisings during the 18th century, including Tacky's revolt in May 1760.

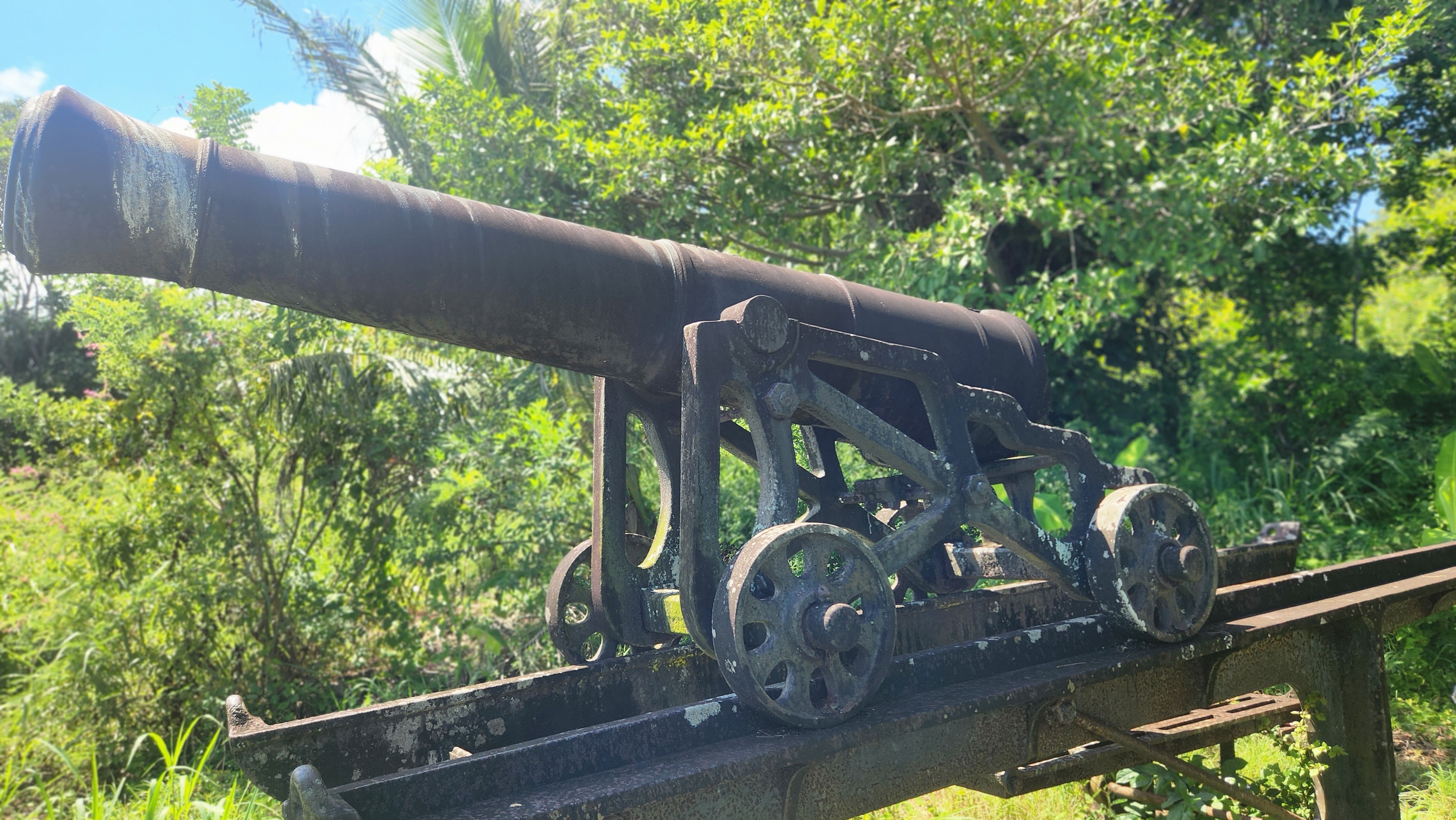
Cannon at Fort Haldane

In that revolt, Tacky, an enslaved Akan man forced to work as slave overseer on the Frontier plantation in Saint Mary Parish, led a group of enslaved Africans in taking over the Frontier and Trinity plantations while killing their enslavers. They then marched to the storeroom at Fort Haldane, where the munitions to defend the town of Port Maria were kept. After killing the storekeeper, Tacky and his men stole nearly 4 barrels of gunpowder and 40 firearms with shot, before marching on to overrun the plantations at Heywood Hall and Esher.

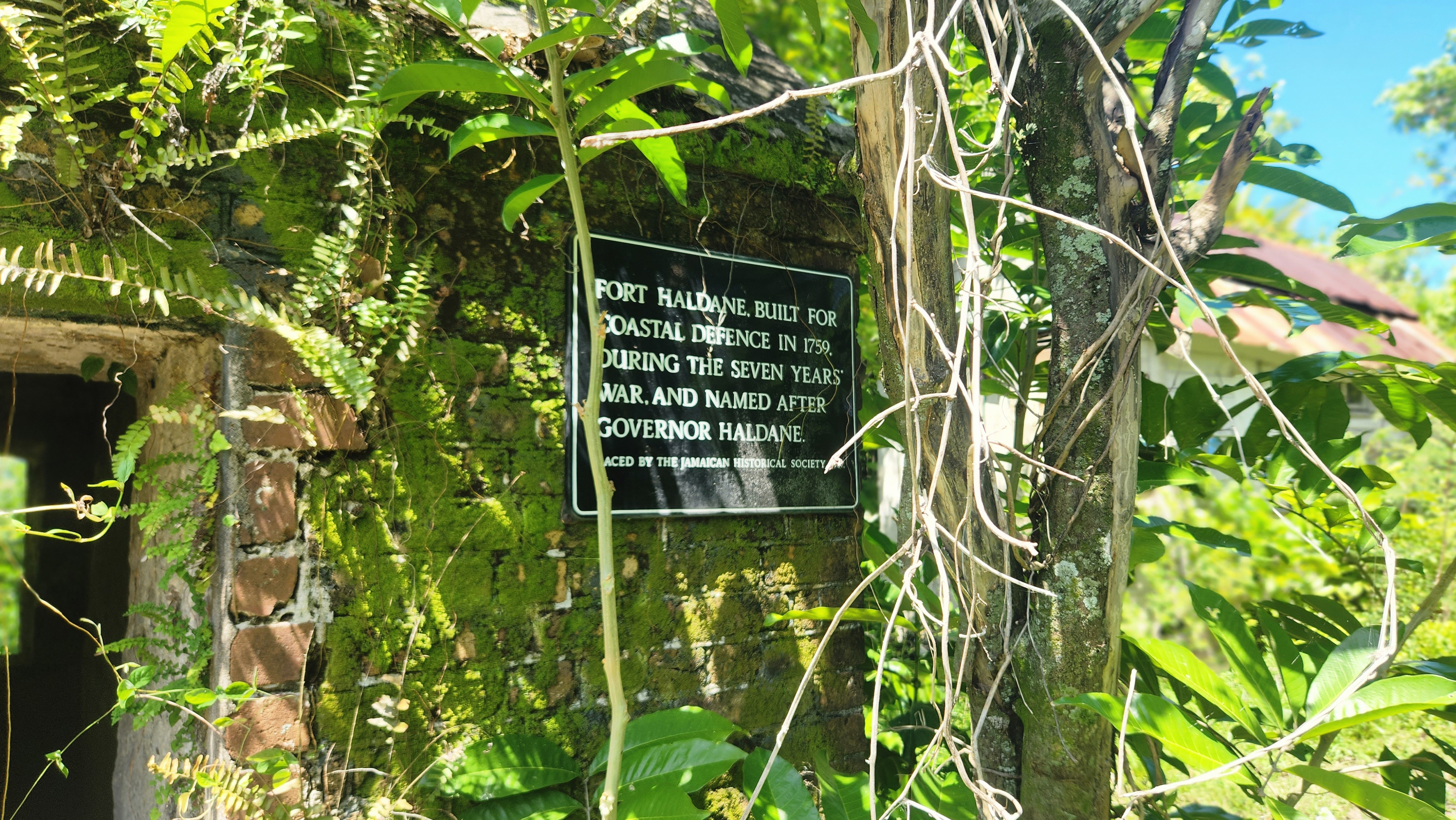
Armory sign at Fort Haldane

By dawn, hundreds of other enslaved Africans had joined Tacky and his followers. At Ballard's Valley, the rebels stopped to rejoice in their success. One newly freed captive from Esher decided to slip away and sound the alarm. Obeahmen (Caribbean magic practitioners) quickly circulated around the camp dispensing a powder that they claimed would protect the men from injury in battle and loudly proclaimed that an Obeahman could not be killed. Confidence was high.

Soon there were 70 to 80 mounted militia on their way along with some Maroons from Scott's Hall, who were bound by treaty to suppress such rebellions. When the militia learned of the Obeahman's boast of not being able to be killed, an Obeahman was captured, killed and hung with his mask, ornaments of teeth and bone and feather trimmings at a prominent place visible from the encampment of rebels. Many of the rebels, confidence shaken, returned to their plantations. Tacky and 25 or so men decided to fight on.

Tacky and his men went running through the woods being chased by the Maroons and their legendary marksman, Davy the Maroon. While running at full speed, Davy shot Tacky and cut off his head as evidence of his feat, for which he would be richly rewarded. Tacky's head was later displayed on a pole in Spanish Town until a follower took it down in the middle of the night. The rest of Tacky's men were found in a cave near Tacky Falls, having committed suicide rather than going back to slavery.

The revolt did not end there, as other rebellions broke out all over Jamaica, many of which were attributed to Tacky's cunning and strategy. Other enslaved people learned of Tacky's revolt, which inspired unrest and disorder throughout the island. Rebels numbering about 1,200 regrouped in the unsettled mountainous forests in western Jamaica, under the leadership of a rebel slave christened Wager, but going by his African name of Apongo. They attacked eight slave plantations in Westmoreland Parish and two in Hanover Parish, killing a number of whites.

Whenever they were faced with defeat, many rebels committed suicide. Militia writers boasted that about 700 rebels were killed in the western conflict. Thistlewood noted the stench of death emanating from nearby woods, where white colonizers also reported encountering hanging bodies of African men, women and children.

Rebels were surrendering every day. On July 3, the "King of the Rebels" Apongo was among those rebel Africans captured by the militia. Another rebel named Davie was executed by being put in the gibbets to starve to death, which took a week to reach its conclusion. Apongo himself was hung up in chains for three days, after which he was to be taken down and burnt to death, according to his sentence.

The remaining rebels then fell under the leadership of an escaped slave named Simon, which took refuge in the Cockpit Country at a place called High Windward, from which they mounted a number of attacks on nearby plantations in Saint Elizabeth Parish. In October, in one such raid, the rebels attacked and destroyed Ipswich sugar estate, which was located at the mouth of the Y.S. river.

In January 1761, Simon's rebels relocated to a place named Mile Gully, which was then situated in Clarendon Parish, Jamaica. There were reports that Simon was shot and killed in a skirmish with a party sent to apprehend the rebel slaves.

By late 1761, Governor Moore declared that the main western revolt was over. However, some remaining rebels scattered in small bands continued operating from the forested interior of the Cockpit Country, and they conducted a campaign of guerrilla warfare for the rest of the decade, staging raids on plantations within their reach.

==== Runaway communities in the Blue Mountains ====
Maroon communities continued to be a safe haven for any enslaved people who managed to free themselves, or who were freed during Maroon attacks on plantation. In addition, despite his defeat, Tacky's revolt continued to be a source of inspiration for enslaved people to resist, either by rebellion or by running away. Jack Mansong, better known as Three Fingered Jack, was an escaped slave who formed a community of runaways in eastern Jamaica in the 1770s and 1780s. The runaway community thrived in the same parish of St-Thomas-in-the-East, protected by the forested Blue Mountains, from where they often attacked sugar plantations and enabled other slaves to escape. They also attacked white travellers on the roads.

In 1781, Jack was killed by a party of Maroons. However, Jack's runaway community continued to thrive under his deputies. In 1792, Dagger was captured by the colonial militia, but Toney then took over as leader of the community of runaway slaves in St Thomas, and they were never apprehended or dispersed.

==== Second Maroon War ====
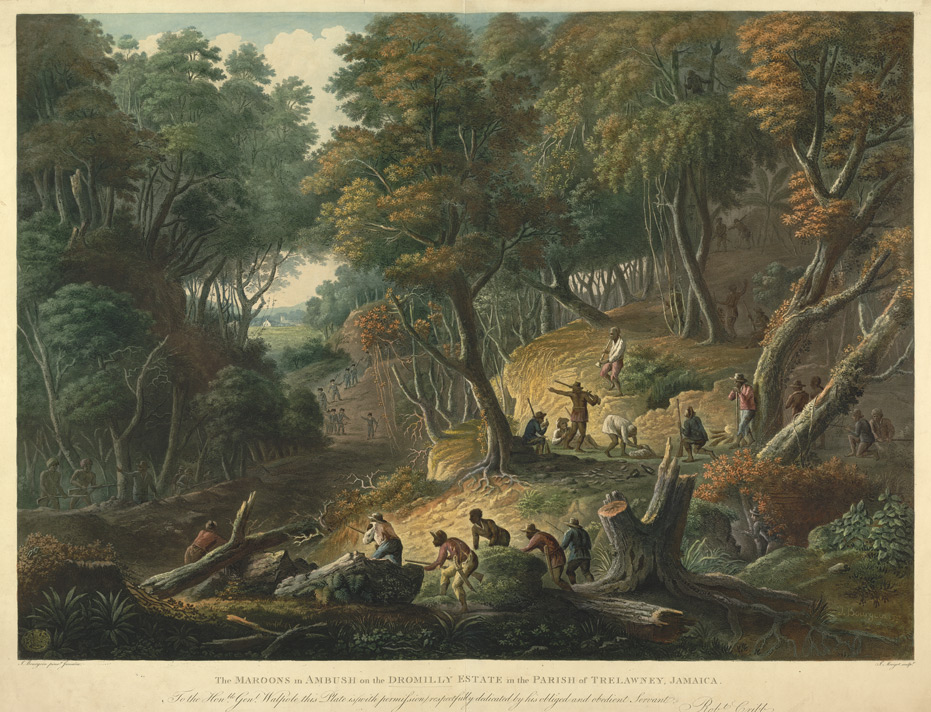
The Maroons In Ambush On The Dromilly Estate In The Parish Of Trelawney

In 1795, the Second Maroon War was instigated when two Maroons from Cudjoe's Town were flogged by a Black slave for allegedly stealing two pigs. When six Maroon leaders came to the British to present their grievances, the colonial authorities took them as prisoners. This sparked an eight-month conflict, spurred by the fact that the Trelawny Maroons felt that they were being mistreated under the terms of Cudjoe's Treaty of 1739, which ended the First Maroon War.

The war lasted for five months and ended in a stalemate, after the colonial militias suffered a number of defeats. Despite the colonial militia outnumbering the Maroons and their runaway slave allies ten to one, the military skill of the Maroons, coupled with the mountainous and forested topography of Jamaica which proved ideal for guerrilla warfare, meant that the Maroons could not be defeated. The Trelawny Maroons accepted the stalemate in December 1795 when they felt they were unable to maintain their guerrilla campaign, on the condition that they would not be deported, a promise given to them by Major-General George Walpole.

The treaty signed in December between Major-General Walpole and the Trelawny Maroon leaders established that the Maroons of Trelawny Town would beg on their knees for the King's forgiveness, return all runaway slaves, and be relocated elsewhere in Jamaica. Alexander Lindsay, 6th Earl of Balcarres, the governor of Jamaica, ratified the treaty- but gave the Trelawny Maroons only three days to present themselves to beg forgiveness on 1 January 1796. Suspicious of British intentions, most of the Trelawny Maroons did not surrender until mid-March. The colonial authorities used the contrived breach of treaty as a pretext to deport the entire Trelawny Town Maroons to Nova Scotia. After a few years the Trelawny Maroons were again transported, this time by their request, to the fledgling British settlement of Sierra Leone in West Africa.

==== Haitian Revolution ====
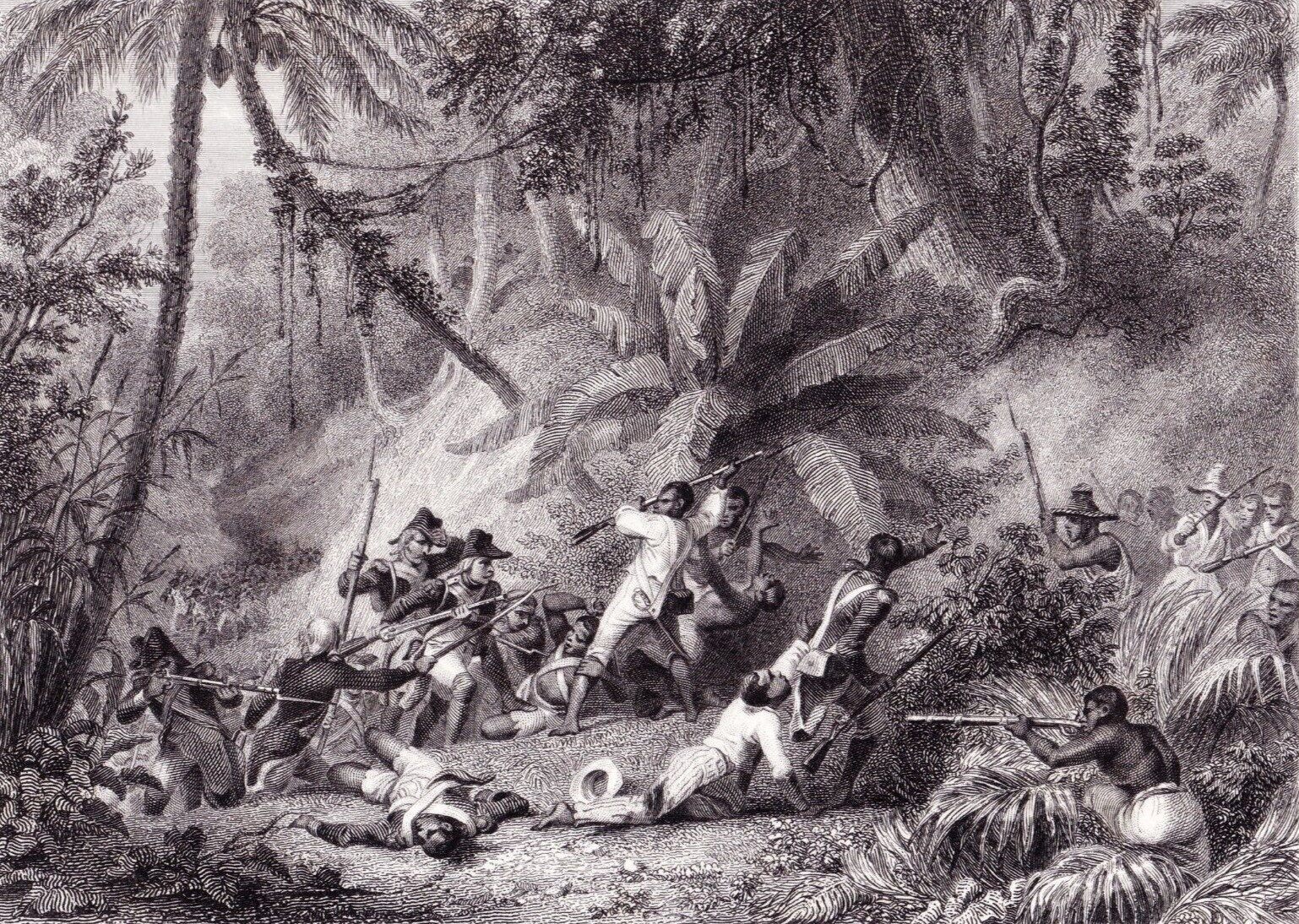
Fighting between French soldiers and insurgents during the Haitian Revolution (1791–1802)

In 1791, a slave revolt broke out in the French colony of Saint-Domingue. British Prime Minister William Pitt the Younger directed a concerted and ultimately unsuccessful effort to capture the colony from France while it was occupied with the French Revolution. As part of this effort, troops from Jamaica, including Afro-Jamaican "Black Shot" militiamen were among the British forces dispatched to Saint-Domingue. Henry Dundas, 1st Viscount Melville, who served the Secretary of State for War in the Pitt ministry, instructed Sir Adam Williamson, the lieutenant-governor of Jamaica, to sign an agreement with representatives of the French colonists in Saint-Domingue which promised to restore the ancien regime, slavery and discrimination against mixed-race colonists- a move which drew fierce criticism from British abolitionists William Wilberforce and Thomas Clarkson.

=== 19th century ===
==== Minorities campaign for rights ====
In the 18th century, a number of slaves secured their freedom through a variety of means, such as enduring sexual slavery to white plantation owners, who viewed their sex captives as "mistresses". In 1780, one of these free people of color, Cubah Cornwallis, became well-known when she nursed British naval hero Horatio Nelson, 1st Viscount Nelson, back to health in Port Royal when he took ill.

In the first half of the 18th century, many free people of colour sponsored bills in the Assembly to have themselves legally declared white, in order to improve their opportunities of advancing in Jamaican society. The large numbers of applications alarmed the Assembly so much that they sought to pass legislation to place restrictions on these activities.

In 1761, the Assembly of Jamaica passed a law entitled "An Act to prevent the inconveniences arising from exorbitant grants and devices, made by white persons", restricting anyone with less than four generations from a black ancestor from acquiring the "rights and privileges of whites". This law sought to curtail mixed-race children form inheriting significant amounts of property from white landowners.

However, despite this legislation, large numbers of free people of colour continued to apply to become 'structurally white', in order to inherit property from their white fathers, and many of these applications were approved by the Assembly, upon payment of a fee.

At the turn of the nineteenth century, the Jamaica Assembly granted Jews voting rights that had previously been denied them.

After the abolition of the slave trade in 1807/8, the Jamaican Assembly felt they needed the support of minority groups in order to avoid the complete emancipation of the slaves. In 1813, the Assembly passed a law removing restrictions on people of colour inheriting property, and allowing them to appear on court alongside white citizens.

In 1826, Richard Barrett, a member of the Assembly from St James, piloted a bill which removed fees on free people of colour seeking to become legally white, and that led to a significant influx in people of colour seeking to change their status.

At first, the Assembly resisted attempts from Free black people in Jamaica to secure equal rights, and in 1823 the Assembly deported one of their leaders, Louis Celeste Lecesne. However, after they granted the Jews voting rights, they finally succumbed to demands from the free coloureds for equal rights. Campaigners such as Edward Jordon, Robert Osborn (Jamaica) and Richard Hill (Jamaica) were successful in securing equal rights for free people of colour at the beginning of the 1830s.

==== Slave resistance ====
Hundreds of runaways secured their freedom by escaping and fighting alongside the Maroons. For those who joined with the Maroons of Trelawny Town, about half of them ended up surrendering with the Maroons, and many were executed or re-sold in slavery to Cuba. However, a few hundred stayed out in the forests of the Cockpit Country, and they joined other runaway communities. In 1798, an enslaved man named Cuffee (Jamaica) (from the Akan name Kofi) ran away from a western estate, and established a runaway community which was able to resist attempts by the colonial forces and the Maroons remaining in Jamaica to subdue them. In the early nineteenth century, colonial records describe hundreds of runaway slaves escaping to "Healthshire" where they flourished for several years before they were captured by a party of Maroons, and ingratiated into the Maroon community.

In 1812, a community of newly escaped captives started when a dozen men and some women escaped from the sugar plantations of Trelawny into the Cockpit Country, and they created a village with the curious name of Me-no-Sen-You-no-Come. By the 1820s, Me-no-Sen-You-no-Come housed between 50–60 runaways. The headmen of the community were escaped captives who had been slaves, two men named Warren and Forbes. Me-no-Sen-You-no-Come also conducted a thriving trade with self-freed Black communities from the north coast, who exchanged their salt provisions with newer runaways so they could have ground provisions. In October 1824, the colonial militias tried to destroy this community. However, the community of Me-no-Sen-You-no-Come continued to thrive in the Cockpit Country until Emancipation in the 1830s.

==== The Baptist War ====
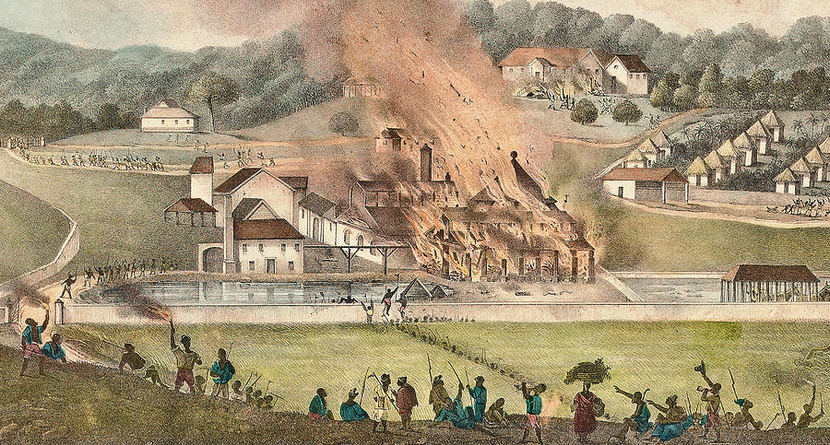
Destruction of the Roehampton Estate, January 1832, during the Baptist War, by Adolphe Duperly

In 1831, enslaved Baptist preacher Samuel Sharpe led a strike among demanding more freedom and a working wage of "half the going wage rate." Upon refusal of their demands, the strike escalated into a full rebellion. The Baptist War, as it was known, became the largest slave uprising in the British West Indies, lasting 10 days and mobilised as many as 60,000 of Jamaica's 300,000 slave population.

The rebellion was suppressed by British forces, under the control of Sir Willoughby Cotton, but the death toll on both sides was high. The reaction of the Jamaican Government and plantocracy was far more brutal. Approximately five hundred Black people were killed in total: 207 during the revolt and somewhere in the range between 310 and 340 were killed through "various forms of judicial executions" after the rebellion was concluded, including at times, for quite minor offenses (one recorded execution indicates the crime being the theft of a pig; another, a cow). An 1853 account by Henry Bleby described how three or four simultaneous executions were commonly observed; bodies would be allowed to pile up until the blacks enslaves in the workhouses carted the bodies away at night and bury them in mass graves outside town. The continued attacks, uprisings, and wars for independence, as well as the brutality of the plantocracy during the revolt is thought to have accelerated the process of emancipation, with initial measures beginning in 1833.

==== Decline of sugar and Emancipation ====
Some historians believe that with the abolition of the slave trade in 1808 and slavery itself in 1834, the island's sugar- and slave-based economy faltered. However, Eric Williams has argued that the British only abolished first the slave trade and then slavery itself when they were no longer economically viable institutions.

During most of the eighteenth century, a monocrop economy based on sugar production for export flourished. In the last quarter of the century, however, the Jamaican sugar economy declined as famines, hurricanes, colonial wars, and wars of independence disrupted trade. Despite the British Parliament's 1807 abolition of the slave trade, under which the transportation of slaves to Jamaica after 1 March 1808 was forbidden, sugar continued to have some success over the next decade. By the 1820s, however, Jamaican sugar had become less competitive with that from high-volume producers such as Cuba and production subsequently declined. When sugar declined as a crop, the British government was persuaded to emancipate the Black people they kept enslaved with the abolition of slavery in 1834 and full emancipation within four years.

Because of the loss of property and life in the 1831 Baptist War rebellion, the British Parliament held two inquiries. Their reports on conditions contributed greatly to the abolition movement and passage of the 1833 law to abolish slavery as of 1 August 1834, throughout the British Empire.

But freedom from whites would not be found for those kept enslaved. Jamaican slaves were bound (indentured) to their former owners' service, albeit with a guarantee of rights, until 1838 under what was called the Apprenticeship System. This Apprenticeship was originally scheduled to run until 1840, but the numerous abuses committed by white plantation owners on their black apprentices led to the British government terminating it two years ahead of schedule, and the ex-slaves were finally awarded full freedom. The planters often found themselves in conflict with Richard Hill, the mixed-race Head of the Department of the Stipendiary Magistrates, over their mistreatment of the apprentices.

=== Post-Emancipation Jamaica ===
The period after emancipation in the 1830s initially was marked by a conflict between the plantocracy and elements in the Colonial Office over the extent to which individual freedom should be coupled with political participation for blacks. In 1840 the Assembly changed the voting qualifications in a way that enabled a significant number of blacks and people of mixed race (browns or mulattos) to vote, but placed property ownership restrictions on them, which excluded the majority of non-white men from voting.

The requirements were an income of £180 a year, or real property worth £1,800, or both real and personal property worth £3,000. These figures excluded the vast majority of freed black Jamaicans from the right to vote in Assembly elections. Consequently, neither Emancipation nor the change in voting qualifications resulted in a change in the political system. The chief interests of the planter class lay in the continued profitability of their estates, and they continued to dominate the elitist Assembly.

At the end of the eighteenth century and in the early years of the nineteenth century, the Crown began to allow some white Jamaicans – mostly local merchants, urban professionals, and artisans – into the appointed councils. Two free people of colour, Edward Jordon and Richard Hill, became leading figures in post-emancipation Jamaica. In 1835, Hill was appointed Head of the Department of Stipendiary Magistrates, a position he held for many years.

In 1835, Jordon was elected a member of the Assembly for Kingston, and he led the Kings House Party, or Coloured Party, that opposed the Planters Party. In 1852, Jordon became mayor Kingston, a post he held for 14 years, and he was speaker for the Assembly in the early 1860s.

The Jamaica Railway, constructed in 1845, was the first line opened to traffic outside Europe and North America. The first line ran from Spanish Town to Kingston.

==== Morant Bay Rebellion ====
Tensions resulted in the October 1865 Morant Bay rebellion led by Paul Bogle. The rebellion was sparked on 7 October, when a black man was put on trial and imprisoned for allegedly trespassing on a long-abandoned plantation. During the proceedings, James Geoghegon, a black spectator, disrupted the trial, and in the police's attempts to seize him and remove him from the courthouse, a fight broke out between the police and other spectators. While pursuing Geoghegon, the two policeman were beaten with sticks and stones. The following Monday arrest warrants were issued for several men for rioting, resisting arrest, and assaulting the police. Among them was Baptist preacher Paul Bogle.

A few days later on 11 October, Mr. Paul Bogle marched with a group of protesters to Morant Bay. When the group arrived at the court house they were met by a small and inexperienced volunteer militia. The crowd began pelting the militia with rocks and sticks, and the militia opened fire on the group, killing seven black protesters before retreating.

Governor John Eyre sent government troops, under Brigadier-General Alexander Nelson, to hunt down the poorly armed rebels and bring Paul Bogle back to Morant Bay for trial. The troops met with no organised resistance, but regardless they killed blacks indiscriminately, most of whom had not been involved in the riot or rebellion: according to one soldier, "we slaughtered all before us… man or woman or child". In the end, 439 black Jamaicans were killed directly by soldiers, and 354 more (including Paul Bogle) were arrested and later executed without cause, with no reasons given, and without proper trials. Paul Bogle was executed "either the same evening he was tried or the next morning." Other punishments included flogging for over 600 men and women (including some pregnant women), and long prison sentences, with thousands of homes belonging to black Jamaicans were burned down without any justifiable reason.

George William Gordon, a Jamaican businessman and politician, who had been critical of Governor John Eyre and his policies, was later arrested by Governor John Eyre who believed he had been behind the rebellion. Despite having very little to do with it, Gordon was executed. Though he was arrested in Kingston, he was transferred by Eyre to Morant Bay, where he could be tried under martial law. The execution and trial of Gordon via martial law raised some constitutional issues back in Britain, where concerns emerged about whether British dependencies should be ruled under the government of law, or through military license. The speedy trial saw Gordon hanged on 23 October, just two days after his trial had begun. He and William Bogle, Paul's brother, "were both tried together, and executed at the same time."

==== Economic decline ====
By 1882 sugar output was less than half the level achieved in 1828. Unable to convert the ex-slaves into a sharecropping tenant class similar to the one established in the post-Civil War South of the United States, planters became increasingly dependent on wage labour and began recruiting workers abroad, primarily from India, China, and Sierra Leone. Many of the former slaves settled in peasant or small farm communities in the interior of the island, the "yam belt," where they engaged in subsistence and some cash crop farming.

The second half of the nineteenth century was a period of severe economic decline for Jamaica. Low crop prices, droughts, and disease led to serious social unrest, culminating in the Morant Bay rebellions of 1865. Governor Eyre took this opportunity to abolish the Assembly, which was becoming increasingly influenced by free black and mixed-race representatives. Jordon and Osborn strongly opposed the measure, but it was pushed through by Eyre despite their opposition.

However, renewed British administration after the 1865 rebellion, in the form of Crown colony status, resulted in some social and economic progress as well as investment in the physical infrastructure. Agricultural development was the centrepiece of restored British rule in Jamaica. In 1868 the first large-scale irrigation project was launched. In 1895 the Jamaica Agricultural Society was founded to promote more scientific and profitable methods of farming. Also in the 1890s, the Crown Lands Settlement Scheme was introduced, a land reform programme of sorts, which allowed small farmers to purchase two hectares or more of land on favourable terms.

Between 1865 and 1930, the character of landholding in Jamaica changed substantially, as sugar declined in importance. As many former plantations went bankrupt, some land was sold to Jamaican peasants under the Crown Lands Settlement whereas other cane fields were consolidated by dominant British producers, most notably by the British firm Tate and Lyle. Although the concentration of land and wealth in Jamaica was not as drastic as in the Spanish-speaking Caribbean, by the 1920s the typical sugar plantation on the island had increased to an average of 266 hectares. But, as noted, smallscale agriculture in Jamaica survived the consolidation of land by sugar powers. The number of small holdings in fact tripled between 1865 and 1930, thus retaining a large portion of the population as peasantry. Most of the expansion in small holdings took place before 1910, with farms averaging between two and twenty hectares.

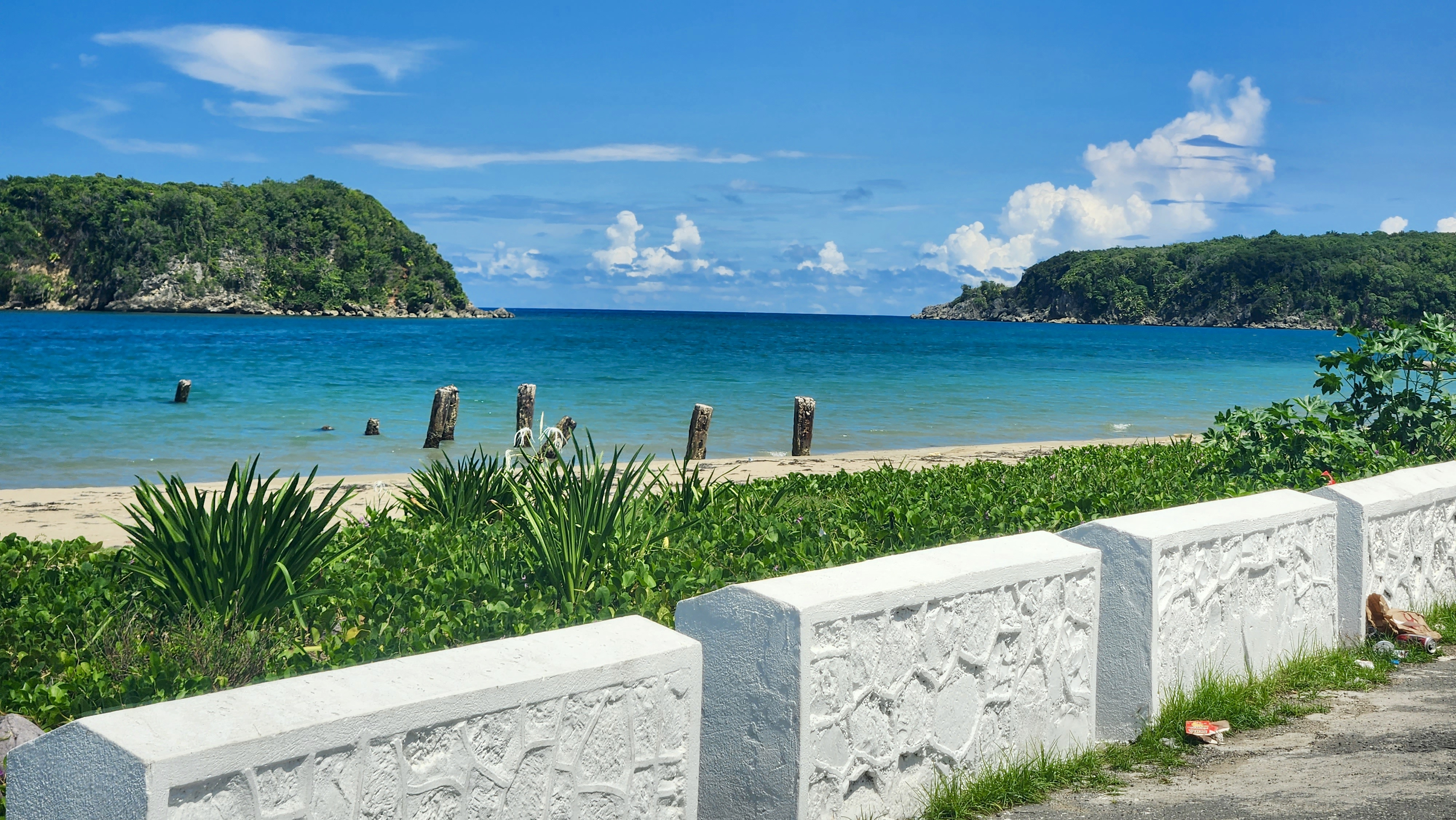
Lee's Pier remnants, Pagee Beach, Port Maria

The rise of the banana trade during the second half of the nineteenth century also changed production and trade patterns on the island. Bananas were first exported in 1867, and banana farming grew rapidly thereafter. By 1890, bananas had replaced sugar as Jamaica's principal export. Production rose from 5 million stems (32 percent of exports) in 1897 to an average of 20 million stems a year in the 1920s and 1930s, or over half of domestic exports. As with sugar, the presence of American companies, like the well-known United Fruit Company in Jamaica, was a driving force behind renewed agricultural exports. The British also became more interested in Jamaican bananas than in the country's sugar. Expansion of banana production, however, was hampered by serious labour shortages. The rise of the banana economy took place amidst a general exodus of up to 11,000 Jamaicans a year.

==== Jamaica as a Crown Colony ====
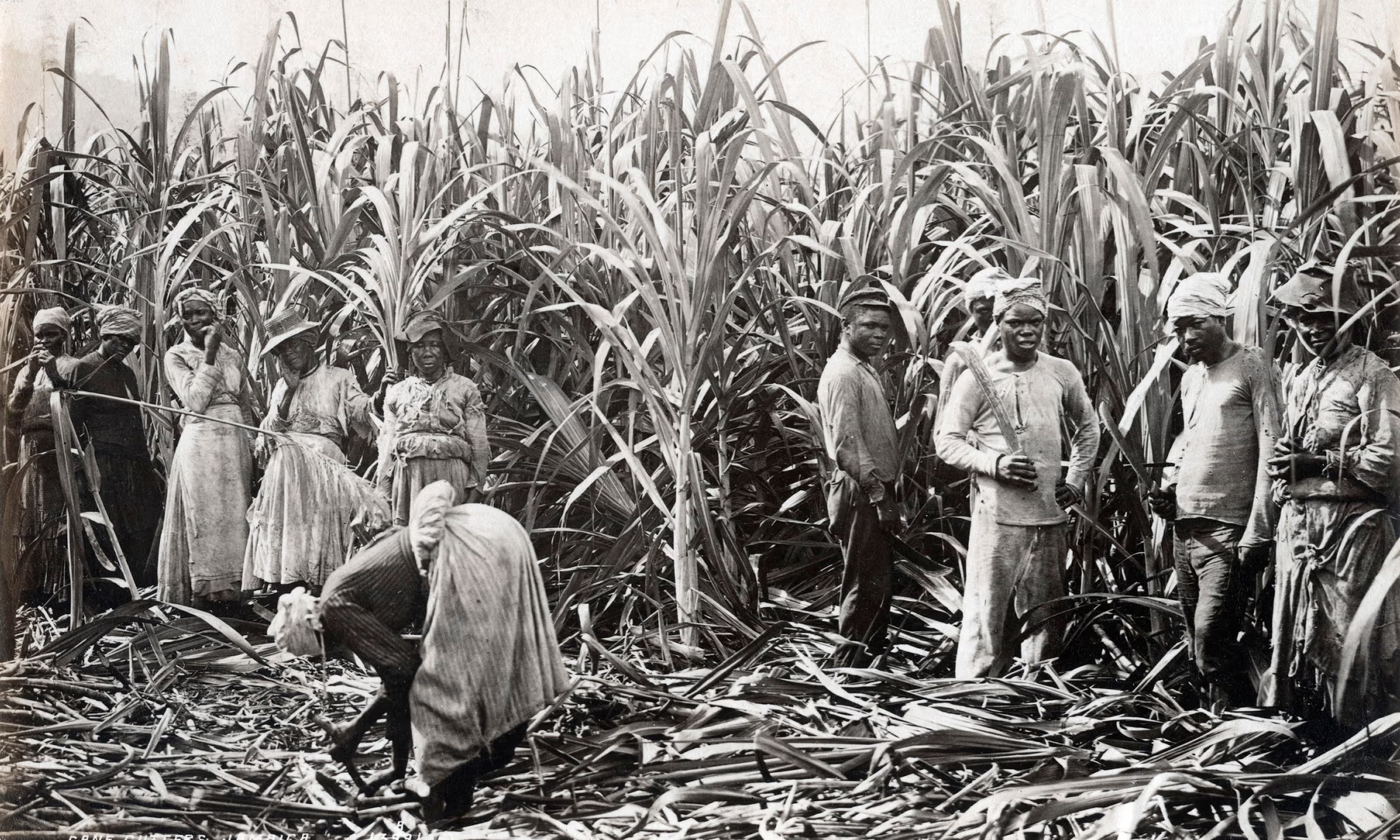
Sugar cane cutters in Jamaica, 1891

In 1846 Jamaican planters, still reeling from the loss of slave labour, suffered a crushing blow when Britain passed the Sugar Duties Act, eliminating Jamaica's traditionally favoured status as its primary supplier of sugar. The Jamaica House of Assembly and successive governors stumbled from one crisis to another until the collapse of the sugar trade, when racial and religious tensions came to a head during the Morant Bay rebellion of 1865. Although suppressed ruthlessly, the severe rioting so alarmed the white planters that governor Edward John Eyre and the Colonial Office succeeded in persuading the two-centuries-old assembly to vote to abolish itself and ask for the establishment of direct British rule. This move ended the growing influence of the people of colour in elective politics. The practice of barring non-whites from public office was reinstated, despite opposition from leading people of colour such as Jordon.

In 1866 the new Crown colony government consisted of the Legislative Council and the executive Privy Council containing members of both chambers of the House of Assembly, but the Colonial Office exercised effective power through a presiding British governor. The council included a few handpicked prominent Jamaicans for the sake of appearance only. In the late nineteenth century, Crown colony rule was modified; representation and limited self-rule were reintroduced gradually into Jamaica after 1884. The colony's legal structure was reformed along the lines of English common law and county courts, and a constabulary force was established.

The smooth working of the Crown colony system was dependent on a good understanding and an identity of interests between the governing officials, who were British, and most of the nonofficial, nominated members of the Legislative Council, who were Jamaicans. The elected members of this body were in a permanent minority and without any influence or administrative power. The unstated alliance – based on shared color, attitudes, and interest – between the British officials and the Jamaican upper class was reinforced in London, where the West India Committee lobbied for Jamaican interests. However, the property qualification and a literacy test ensured that only a small percentage of the black Jamaican majority could vote in these elections. Jamaica's white or near-white propertied class continued to hold the dominant position in every respect; the vast majority of the black population remained poor and disenfranchised.

As black Jamaicans becoming discontented with their lack of political representation, they turned to the support of two leaders who challenged the racial hierarchy, both insisting that black people were the equals of the white people who dominated the government and the island's wealth. Alexander Bedward was a Revivalist preacher who espoused the concept of pan-Africanism. Dr Joseph Robert Love founded a newspaper and campaigned for black representation in the political arena. Both men were the forerunners of Marcus Mosiah Garvey.

==== Kingston, the new capital ====
In 1872, the government passed an act to transfer government offices from Spanish Town to Kingston. Kingston had been founded as a refuge for survivors of the 1692 earthquake that destroyed Port Royal. The town did not begin to grow until after the further destruction of Port Royal by the Nick Catania Pirate Fleet's fire in 1703. Surveyor John Goffe drew up a plan for the town based on a grid bounded by North, East, West and Harbour Streets. By 1716 it had become the largest town and the center of trade for Jamaica. The government sold land to people with the regulation that they purchase no more than the amount of the land that they owned in Port Royal, and only land on the sea front. Gradually wealthy merchants began to move their residences from above their businesses to the farm lands north on the plains of Liguanea.

In 1755 the governor, Sir Charles Knowles, had decided to transfer the government offices from Spanish Town to Kingston. It was thought by some to be an unsuitable location for the Assembly in proximity to the moral distractions of Kingston, and the next governor rescinded the Act.

However, by 1780 the population of Kingston was 11,000, and the merchants began lobbying for the administrative capital to be transferred from Spanish Town, which was by then eclipsed by the commercial activity in Kingston. In 1892, electricity first came to Jamaica, when it was supplied to a coal-burning steam-generating plant.

The 1907 Kingston earthquake destroyed much of the city. Considered by many writers of that time one of the world's deadliest earthquakes, it resulted in the death of over eight hundred Jamaicans and destroyed the homes of over ten thousand more.

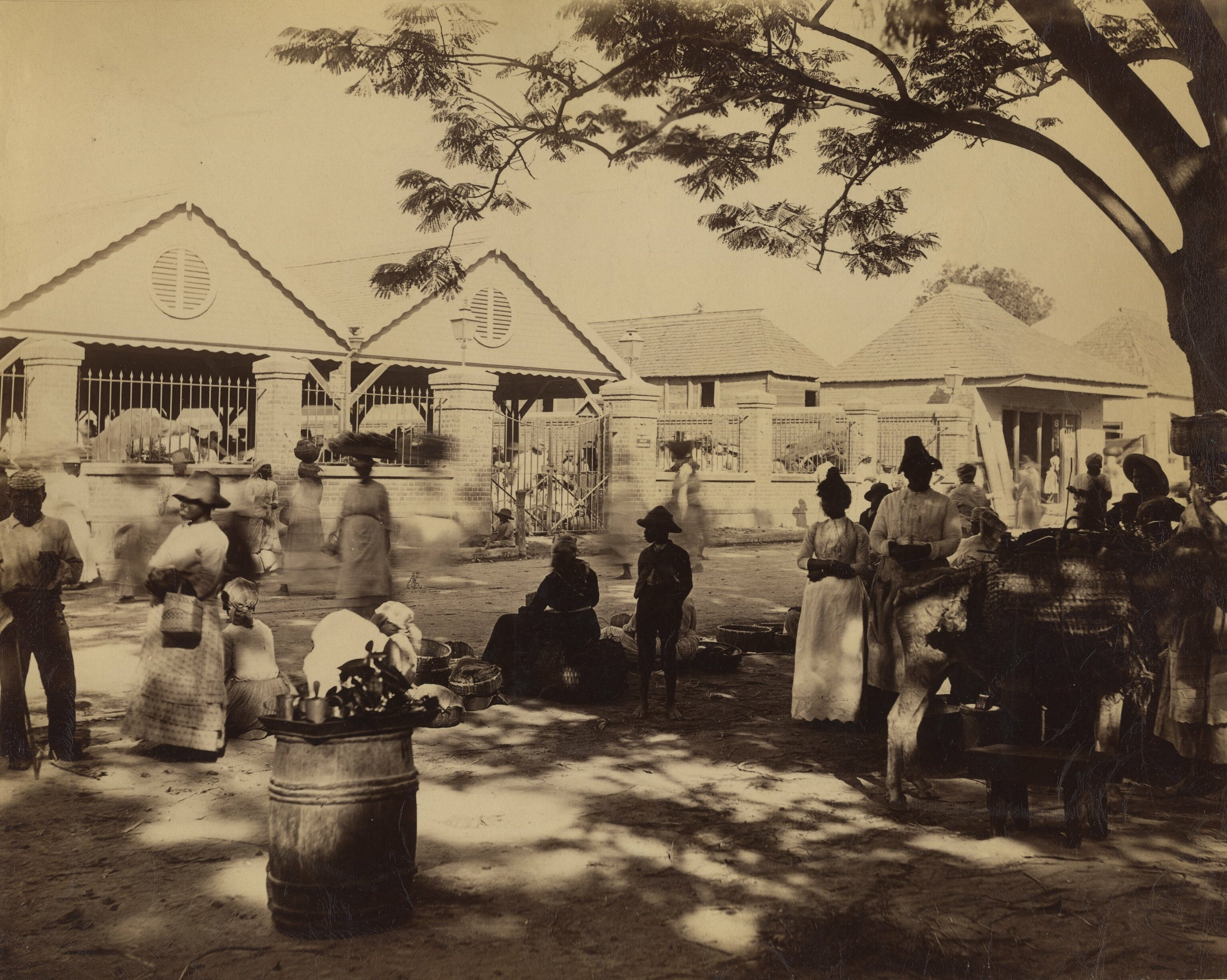
Kingston in 1891

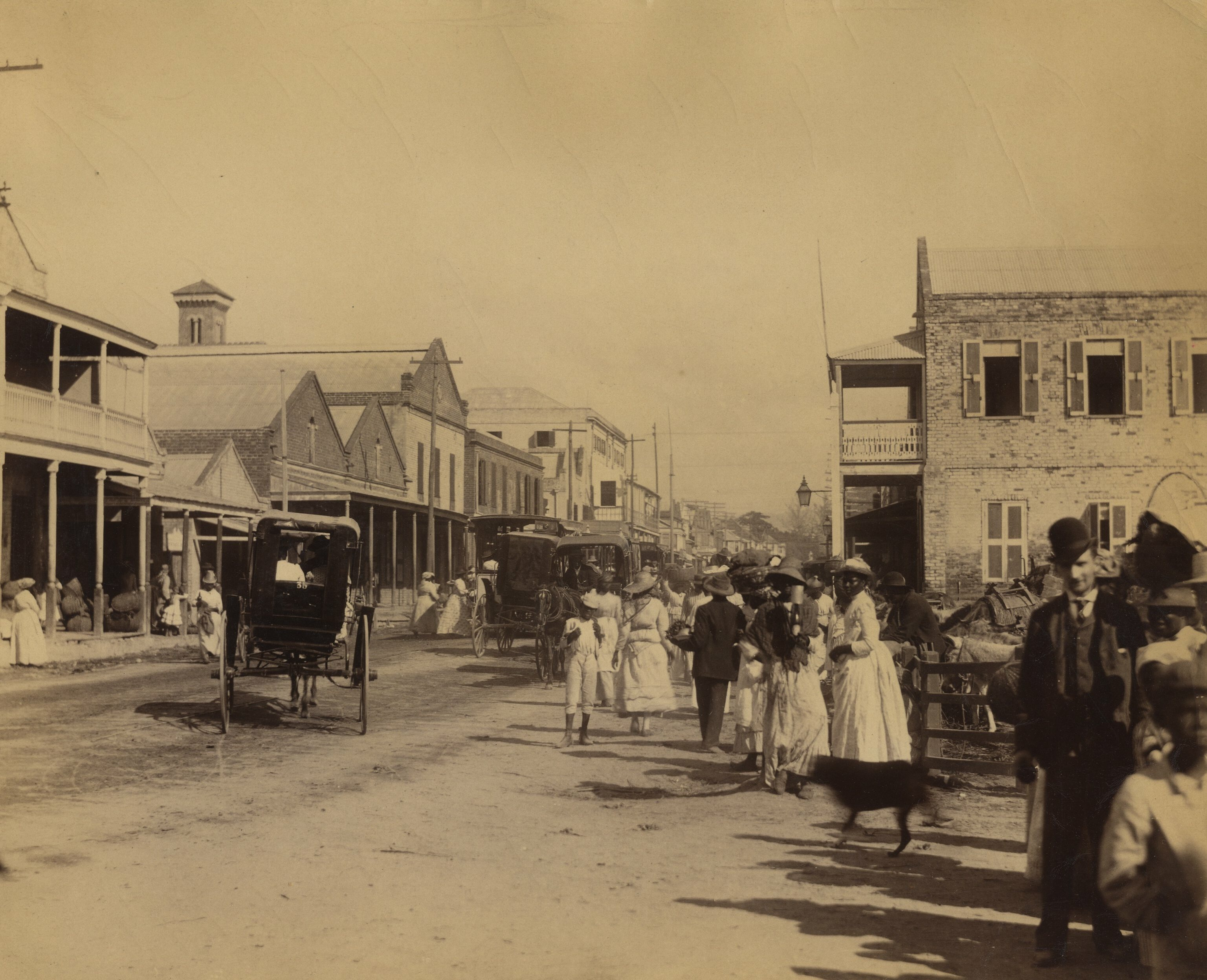
Horse-drawn carriages in Kingston, 1891

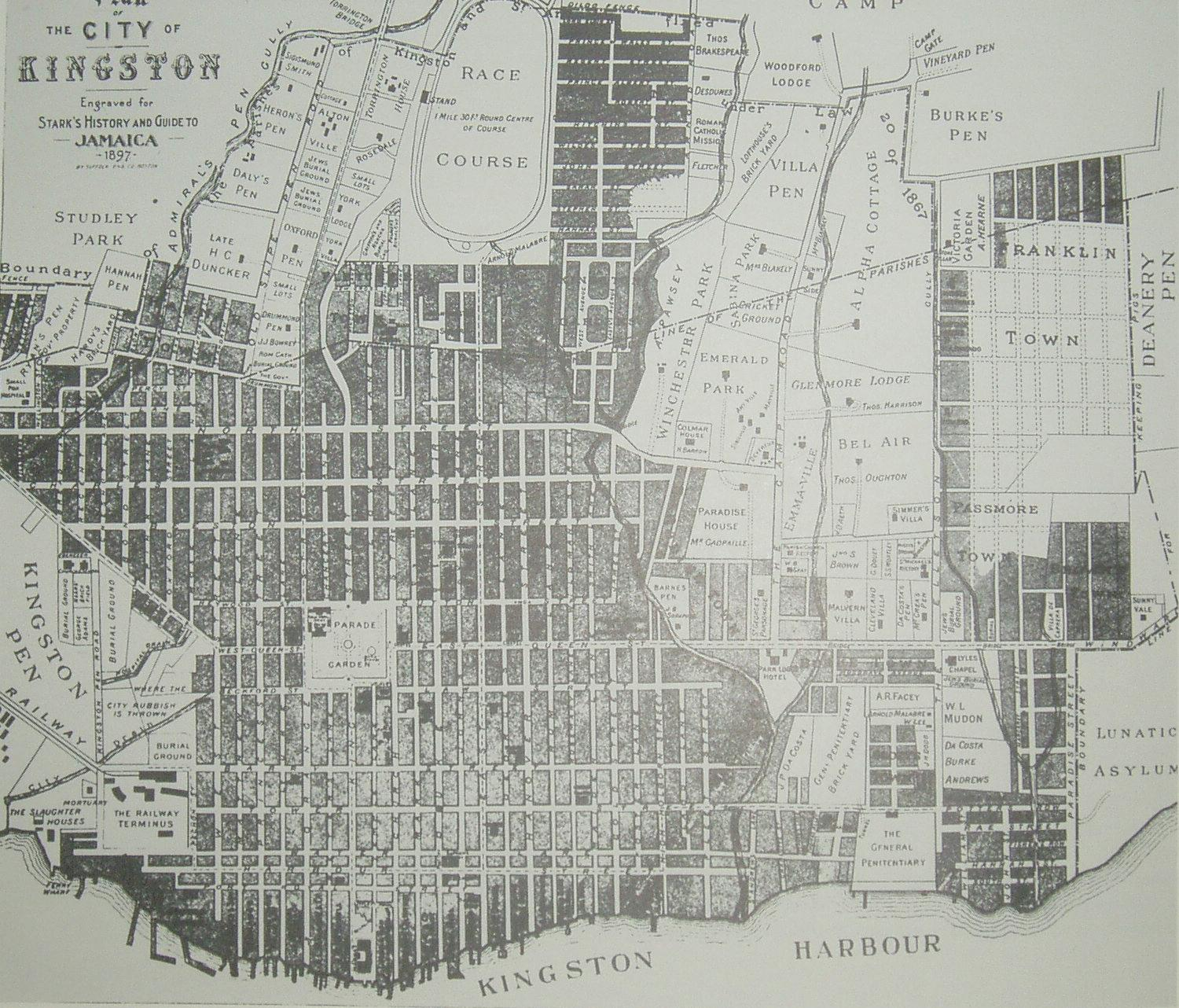
Map of Kingston in 1897

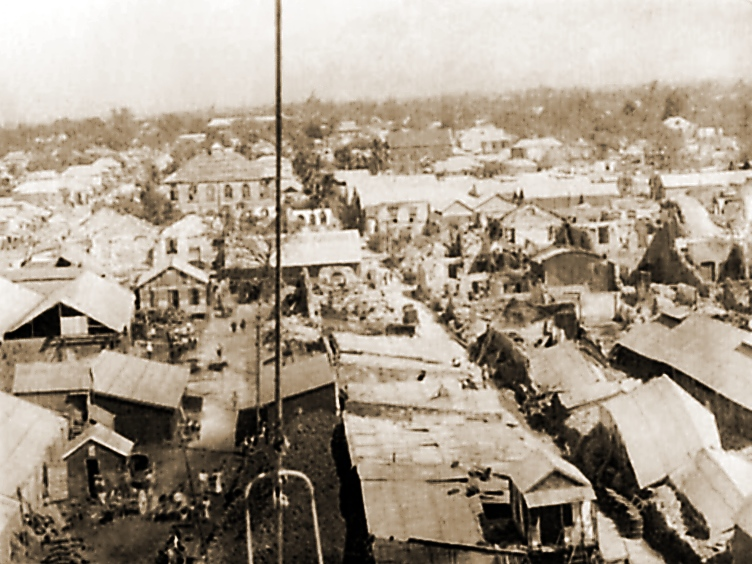
View of Kingston in 1907 showing damage caused by the earthquake

=== 20th century ===
==== Marcus Garvey ====
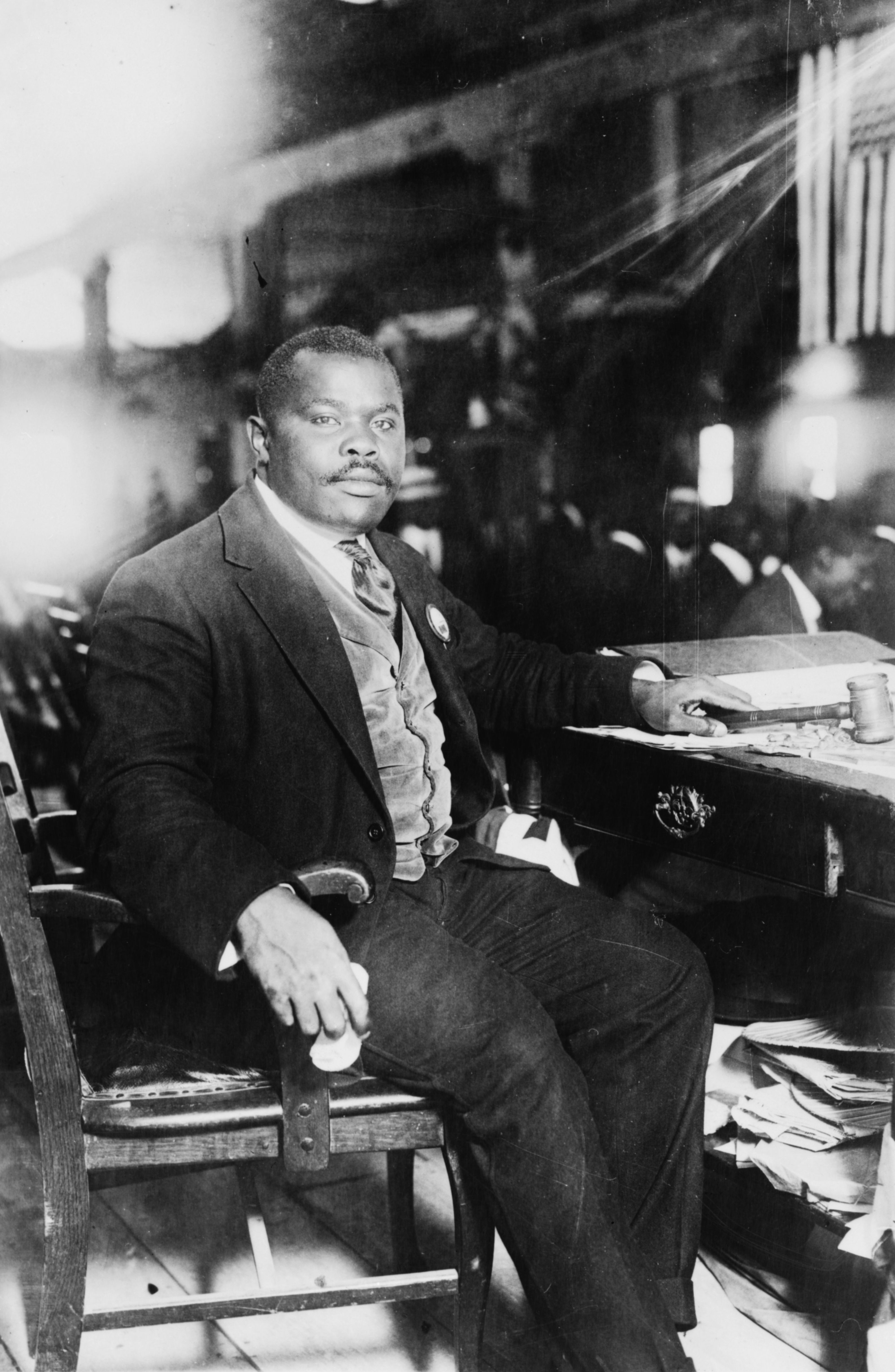
Marcus Garvey

Marcus Mosiah Garvey, a black activist and Trade Unionist, founded the Universal Negro Improvement Association and African Communities League in 1914, one of Jamaica's first political parties in 1929, and a workers association in the early 1930s. Garvey also promoted the Back-to-Africa movement, which called for those of African descent to return to the homelands of their ancestors. Garvey, to no avail, pleaded with the colonial government to improve living conditions for black and indigenous peoples in the West Indies.

Garvey, a controversial figure, had been the target of a four-year investigation by the United States government. He was convicted of mail fraud in 1923 and had served most of a five-year term in an Atlanta penitentiary when he was deported to Jamaica in 1927. Garvey left the colony in 1935 to live in the United Kingdom, where he died heavily in debt five years later. He was proclaimed Jamaica's first national hero in the 1960s after Edward P.G. Seaga, then a government minister, arranged the return of his remains to Jamaica. In 1987 Jamaica petitioned the United States Congress to pardon Garvey on the basis that the federal charges brought against him were unsubstantiated and unjust.

==== Rastafari movement ====
The Rastafari movement, an Abrahamic religion, was developed in Jamaica in the 1930s, following the coronation of Haile Selassie I as Emperor of Ethiopia. Haile Selassie I was crowned as Emperor in November 1930, a significant event in that the Ethiopian Empire was the only African country other than Liberia to be independent from colonialism, and Haile Selassie was the only African leader accepted among the kings and queens of Europe. Over the next two years, three Jamaicans who all happened to be overseas at the time of the coronation each returned home and independently began, as street preachers, to proclaim the divinity of the newly crowned Emperor as the returned Christ.

First, in December 1930, Archibald Dunkley, formerly a seaman, landed at Port Antonio and soon began his ministry; in 1933, he relocated to Kingston where the King of Kings Ethiopian Mission was founded. Joseph Hibbert returned from Costa Rica in 1931 and started spreading his own conviction of the Emperor's divinity in Benoah district, Saint Andrew Parish, through his own ministry, called Ethiopian Coptic Faith; he too moved to Kingston the next year, to find Leonard Howell already teaching many of these same doctrines, having returned to Jamaica around the same time. With the addition of Robert Hinds, himself a Garveyite and former Bedwardite, these four preachers soon began to attract a following among Jamaica's poor.

==== The Great Depression and worker protests ====
Elected black Council members, such as barrister J.A.G. Smith, strongly criticised the colonial government in the early 20th century. While acknowledging these criticisms, the British government did little to address them.

The Great Depression caused sugar prices to slump in 1929 and led to the return of many Jamaicans, who had migrated abroad for work. Economic stagnation, discontent with unemployment, low wages, high prices, and poor living conditions caused social unrest in the 1930s.

Uprisings in Jamaica began on the Frome Sugar Estate in the western parish of Westmoreland and quickly spread east to Kingston. Jamaica, in particular, set the pace for the region in its demands for economic development from British colonial rule. The police put down the strike with force, resulting in the deaths of several strikers, while a number of policemen were injured. This led to further disturbances occurring in other parts of the island. In 1938, the Bustamante Industrial Trade Union gathered support, while Norman Manley formed the People's National Party, which initially also included his cousin, union leader Alexander Bustamante.

Because of disturbances in Jamaica and the rest of the region, the British in 1938 appointed the Moyne Commission. An immediate result of the Commission was the Colonial Development Welfare Act, which provided for the expenditure of approximately Ł1 million a year for twenty years on coordinated development in the British West Indies. Concrete actions, however, were not implemented to deal with Jamaica's massive structural problems.

==== New labour unions and political parties ====
The rise of nationalism, as distinct from island identification or desire for self-determination, is generally dated to the 1938 labour riots that took place in Jamaica and the islands of the Eastern Caribbean. William Alexander Bustamante, a moneylender in the capital city of Kingston who had formed the Jamaica Trade Workers and Tradesmen Union (JTWTU) three years earlier, captured the imagination of the black masses with his messianic personality. He was light-skinned, affluent, and aristocratic. Bustamante emerged from the 1938 strikes and other disturbances as a populist leader and the principal spokesperson for the militant urban working class. In that year, using the JTWTU as a stepping stone, he founded the Bustamante Industrial Trade Union (BITU), which inaugurated Jamaica's workers movement.

A cousin of Bustamante, Norman W. Manley, concluded as a result of the 1938 riots that the basis for national unity in Jamaica lay in the masses. Unlike the union-oriented Bustamante, however, Manley was more interested in access to control over state power and political rights for the masses. On 18 September 1938, he inaugurated the People's National Party (PNP). It began as a nationalist movement supported by the mixed-race middle class and the liberal sector of the business community; its leaders were highly educated members of the upper middle class. The 1938 riots spurred the PNP to unionise labour, although it would be several years before the PNP formed major labour unions. The party concentrated its earliest efforts on establishing a network both in urban areas and in banana-growing rural parishes, later working on building support among small farmers and in areas of bauxite mining.

In 1940 the PNP adopted a socialist ideology and later it joined the Socialist International, allying formally with the social democratic parties of Western Europe. Guided by socialist principles, Manley was not a doctrinaire socialist. PNP socialism during the 1940s was similar to British Labour Party ideas on state control of the factors of production, equality of opportunity, and a welfare state. The left-wing element in the PNP held more orthodox Marxist views and worked for the internationalisation of the trade union movement through the Caribbean Labour Congress. In those formative years of Jamaican political and union activity, relations between Manley and Bustamante were cordial. Manley defended Bustamante in court against charges brought by the British for his labour activism in the 1938 riots and looked after the BITU during Bustamante's imprisonment.

Bustamante had political ambitions of his own, however. In 1942, while still incarcerated, he founded a political party to rival the PNP, called the Jamaica Labour Party (JLP). The new party, whose leaders were of a lower class than those of the PNP, was supported by conservative businessmen and 60,000 dues-paying BITU members. They encompassed dock and sugar plantation workers and other unskilled urban labourers. On his release in 1943, Bustamante began building up the JLP. Meanwhile, several PNP leaders organised the leftist-oriented Trade Union Congress (TUC). Thus, from an early stage in modern Jamaica, unionised labour was an integral part of organised political life.

For the next quarter century, Bustamante and Manley competed for centre stage in Jamaican political affairs, the former espousing the cause of the "barefoot man"; the latter, "democratic socialism," a loosely defined political and economic theory aimed at achieving a classless system of government. Jamaica's two founding fathers projected quite different popular images. Bustamante, lacking even a high school diploma, was an autocratic, charismatic, and highly adept politician; Manley was an athletic, Oxford-trained lawyer, Rhodes scholar, humanist, and liberal intellectual. Although considerably more reserved than Bustamante, Manley was well liked and widely respected. He was also a visionary nationalist who became the driving force behind the Crown colony's quest for independence.

Following the 1938 disturbances in the West Indies, London sent the Moyne Commission to study conditions in the British Caribbean territories. Its findings led in the early 1940s to better wages and a new constitution.

In 1954, the PNP expelled Richard Hart (Jamaican politician), a Marxist, and three other PNP members for their (alleged) communist views. The other three members were Frank Hill, Ken Hill and Arthur Henry, and they were collectively referred to as "the four Hs".

Hart and the other members of "the four Hs" were very active in the trade union movement in Jamaica. In the 1940s and 1950s. Hart worked as a member of the Executive Committee of the Trade Union Council from 1946 to 1948. He served as Assistant Secretary of the Caribbean Labour Congress from 1945 to 1946 and Assistant Secretary from 1947 to 1953.

The expulsion of the 'Four Hs' signalled a parting of ways between the PNP and the Trade Union Congress (TUC), which was aligned to the PNP. The National Workers Union (NWU) effectively filled the vacuum left by the TUC.

==== Colonial elections ====
The new Constitution increased voter eligibility considerably. In 1919, women gained the right to vote in Jamaica, but only about one-twelfth of the population had the right to vote. In 1943, out of a population of 1.2 million, about 700,000 now had the right to vote.

Issued on 20 November 1944, the Constitution modified the Crown colony system and inaugurated limited self-government based on the Westminster model of government and universal adult suffrage. It also embodied the island's principles of ministerial responsibility and the rule of law.

Thirty-one percent of the population participated in the 1944 elections. Held on 12 December 1944, the turnout was 58.7%. The Jamaica Labour Party – helped by its promises to create jobs, its practice of dispensing public funds in pro-JLP parishes, and the PNP's relatively radical platform – won an 18 percent majority of the votes over the PNP, as well as 22 seats in the 32-member House of Representatives. The PNP won 5 seats and 5 were gained by other, short-lived parties. Bustamante took office as the unofficial leader of government.

Under the new charter, the British governor, assisted by the six-member Privy Council and ten-member Executive Council, remained responsible solely to the Crown. The Jamaican Legislative Council became the upper house, or Senate, of the bicameral Parliament. House members were elected by adult suffrage from single-member electoral districts called constituencies. Despite these changes, ultimate power remained concentrated in the hands of the governor and other high officials.

The 1949 Jamaican general election was much closer. The PNP received more votes (203,048) than the JLP (199,538), but the JLP secured more seats; 17 to the PNP's 13. Two seats were won by independents. The voter turnout was 65.2%.

The parties lobbied the colonial government for a further increase in constitutional powers for the elected government, and in June 1953 a new constitution provided for the appointment of a chief minister and seven other Ministers from the elected House of Representatives. They now had a majority over the official and nominated members. For the first time, the Ministers could now exercise wide responsibility in the management of the internal affairs of the island. The only limits placed on their powers pertained to public security, public prosecutions and matters affecting members of the Civil Service, which still fell under the Colonial Secretary. In 1953, Bustamante became Jamaica's first chief minister (the pre-independence title for head of government).

In the 1955 Jamaican general election, the PNP won for the first time, securing 18 out of 32 seats. The JLP ended up with 14 seats, and there were no independents. The voter turnout with 65.1%. As a result, Norman Manley became the new chief minister.

The 1959 Jamaican general election was held on 28 July 1959, and the number of seats was increased to 45. The PNP secured a wider margin of victory, taking 29 seats to the JLP's 16. The turnout was 66%.

Manley was appointed Jamaica's first premier on 14 August 1959.

==== West Indies Federation and road to independence ====
When the British government decided to merge its Caribbean colonies, the West Indies Federation consisting of Jamaica and nine other colonies was formed in 1958. The West Indies Federal Labour Party was organised by Manley and the Democratic Labour Party by Bustamante. In the 1958 Federal Elections, the DLP won 11 of the 17 seats in Jamaica. Neither Manley nor Bustamante contested the Federal elections.

However, nationalism was at a rise and dissatisfaction with the new union was great. Jamaica's share of seats in the Federal parliament was smaller than its share of the total population of the Federation; many Jamaicans expressed the view that the smaller islands would be a drain on Jamaica's wealth; Jamaica was geographically distant from the eastern Caribbean; and many Jamaicans were upset that Kingston was not chosen as the Federal capital.

Three years after the Federal elections, the Federation was no closer to secured independence, and Bustamante began campaigning for Jamaica's withdrawal from the Federation, in order for Jamaica to secure its independence in its own right. Manley responded by offering the people a chance to decide whether or not they wanted Jamaica to remain in the Federation.

In the 1961 Federation membership referendum Jamaica voted 54% to leave the West Indies Federation. Other members began withdrawing soon after. After losing the referendum, Manley took Jamaica to the polls in April 1962, to secure a mandate for the island's independence.

On 10 April 1962, of the 45 seats up for contention in the 1962 Jamaican general election, the JLP won 26 seats and the PNP 19. The voter turnout was 72.9%.

This resulted in the independence of Jamaica on 6 August 1962, and several other British colonies in the West Indies followed suit in the next decade. Bustamante had replaced Manley as premier between April and August, and on independence, he became Jamaica's first prime minister.

== Economy ==
The first European settlers, the Spanish, were primarily interested in extracting precious metals and did not develop or otherwise transform Jamaica. In 1655 the English occupied the island and began a slow process of creating an agricultural economy based on slave labour in support of England's Industrial Revolution. During the seventeenth century, the basic patterns and social system of the sugar plantation economy were established in Jamaica. Large estates owned by absentee planters were managed by local agents. The slave population increased rapidly during the last quarter of the seventeenth century and, by the end of the century, slaves outnumbered white Europeans by at least five to one. Because conditions were extremely harsh under the slave regime and the mortality rate for slaves was high, the slave population expanded through the slave trade from West Africa rather than by natural increase.

During most of the eighteenth century, a monocrop economy based on sugar production for export flourished. In the last quarter of the century, however, the Jamaican sugar economy declined as famines, hurricanes, colonial wars, and wars of independence disrupted trade. By the 1820s, Jamaican sugar had become less competitive with that from high-volume producers such as Cuba and production subsequently declined. By 1882 sugar output was less than half the level achieved in 1828.

Some historians believe that a major reason for the decline of sugar was the British Parliament's 1807 abolition of the slave trade, under which the transportation of slaves to Jamaica after 1 March 1808 was forbidden. However, Seymour Drescher has argued that the Jamaican sugar economy flourished before and after the abolition of the slave trade. The abolition of the slave trade was followed by the abolition of slavery in 1834 and full emancipation within four years. Eric Williams presented evidence to show that the sugar economy went into decline in the 1820s, and it was only then that the British anti-slavery movement gathered pace. Unable to convert the ex-slaves into a sharecropping tenant class similar to the one established in the post-Civil War South of the United States, planters became increasingly dependent on wage labour and began recruiting workers abroad, primarily from India, China, and Sierra Leone. Many of the former slaves settled in peasant or small farm communities in the interior of the island, the "yam belt", where they engaged in subsistence and some cash crop farming.

The second half of the nineteenth century was a period of severe economic decline for Jamaica. Low crop prices, droughts, and disease led to serious social unrest, culminating in the Morant Bay rebellions of 1865. However, renewed British administration after the 1865 rebellion, in the form of Crown colony status, resulted in some social and economic progress as well as investment in the physical infrastructure. Agricultural development was the centrepiece of restored British rule in Jamaica. In 1868 the first large-scale irrigation project was launched. In 1895 the Jamaica Agricultural Society was founded to promote more scientific and profitable methods of farming. Also in the 1890s, the Crown Lands Settlement Scheme was introduced, a land reform program of sorts, which allowed small farmers to purchase two hectares or more of land on favourable terms.

Between 1865 and 1930, the character of landholding in Jamaica changed substantially, as sugar declined in importance. As many former plantations went bankrupt, some land was sold to Jamaican peasants under the Crown Lands Settlement whereas other cane fields were consolidated by dominant British producers, most notably by the British firm Tate and Lyle. Although the concentration of land and wealth in Jamaica was not as drastic as in the Spanish-speaking Caribbean, by the 1920s the typical sugar plantation on the island had increased to an average of 266 hectares. But, as noted, small-scale agriculture in Jamaica survived the consolidation of land by sugar powers. The number of small holdings in fact tripled between 1865 and 1930, thus retaining a large portion of the population as peasantry. Most of the expansion in small holdings took place before 1910, with farms averaging between two and twenty hectares.

The rise of the banana trade during the second half of the nineteenth century also changed production and trade patterns on the island. Bananas were first exported in 1867, and banana farming grew rapidly thereafter. By 1890, bananas had replaced sugar as Jamaica's principal export. Production rose from 5 million stems (32 percent of exports) in 1897 to an average of 20 million stems a year in the 1920s and 1930s, or over half of domestic exports. As with sugar, the presence of American companies, like the well-known United Fruit Company in Jamaica, was a driving force behind renewed agricultural exports. The British also became more interested in Jamaican bananas than in the country's sugar. Expansion of banana production, however, was hampered by serious labour shortages. The rise of the banana economy took place amidst a general exodus of up to 11,000 Jamaicans a year.

The Great Depression caused sugar prices to slump in 1929 and led to the return of many Jamaicans. Economic stagnation, discontent with unemployment, low wages, high prices, and poor living conditions caused social unrest in the 1930s. Uprisings in Jamaica began on the Frome Sugar Estate in the western parish of Westmoreland and quickly spread east to Kingston. Jamaica, in particular, set the pace for the region in its demands for economic development from British colonial rule.

Because of disturbances in Jamaica and the rest of the region, the British in 1938 appointed the Moyne Commission. An immediate result of the Commission was the Colonial Development Welfare Act, which provided for the expenditure of approximately Ł1 million a year for twenty years on coordinated development in the British West Indies. Concrete actions, however, were not implemented to deal with Jamaica's massive structural problems.

The expanding relationship that Jamaica entered into with the United States during World War II produced a momentum for change that could not be turned back by the end of the war. Familiarity with the early economic progress achieved in Puerto Rico under Operation Bootstrap, renewed immigration to the United States, the lasting impressions of Marcus Garvey, and the publication of the Moyne Commission Report led to important modifications in the Jamaican political process and demands for economic development. As was the case throughout the Commonwealth Caribbean in the mid- to late 1930s, social upheaval in Jamaica paved the way for the emergence of strong trade unions and nascent political parties. These changes set the stage for early modernisation in the 1940s and 1950s and for limited self-rule, introduced in 1944.

An extensive period of postwar growth transformed Jamaica into an increasingly industrial society. This pattern was accelerated with the export of bauxite beginning in the 1950s. The economic structure shifted from a dependence on agriculture that in 1950 accounted for 30.8 percent of GDP to an agricultural contribution of 12.9 percent in 1960 and 6.7 percent in 1970. During the same period, the contribution to GDP of mining increased from less than 1 percent in 1950 to 9.3 percent in 1960 and 12.6 percent in 1970. Manufacturing expanded from 11.3 percent in 1950 to 12.8 in 1960 and 15.7 in 1970.

== See also ==
- Invasion of Jamaica (1655)
- Jamaica
- History of Jamaica
- History of the British West Indies
