= St. William Grant =

St. William Grant OD
- Born: August 27, 1894; Brandon Hill, St Andrew, Colony of Jamaica, British Empire
- Died: 27 August 1977 (aged 83); Kingston, Jamaica
- Education: St Phillips Church School, St Andrew; West Branch Elementary School, Kingston
- Years active: 1930s
- Known for: Trade unionist and labour activist
- Awards: Order of Distinction
- Military career
- Allegiance: United Kingdom
- Branch: British Army; Eleventh British West Indian Regiment
- Service years: 1914–1918
- Rank: Sergeant
- Conflicts: World War I

William Wellington Wellwood Grant OD (1894 – 27 August 1977) was a Jamaican labour activist. He was known as "St. William Grant", "St." presumably meaning "Sergeant" in reference to his military or UNIA service.

He is regarded as the person who started the struggle of the working class in Jamaica. Understanding that as an uneducated black man he would never win the respect of the Colonial Government, he entrusted Alexander Bustamante with the responsibility of taking the struggles of the working class to the next level.

== Early life ==
Grant was born at Brandon Hill in rural St Andrew. He attended St Phillips Church School in St Andrew and West Branch Elementary School in Kingston. As a young man he became a dockworker in Kingston. With the advent of World War I he stowed away on a British troop ship, subsequently joining the Eleventh British West India Regiment.

After the war he returned briefly to Jamaica before emigrating to New York in 1920. There he worked as a cook in restaurants while involved with the Tiger division of the Universal Negro Improvement Association and African Communities League(UNIA).

== Activism ==
In 1934 he served as a delegate to the UNIA convention in Jamaica, where he was expelled from UNIA by Marcus Garvey himself for "misrepresenting the aims and objectives of the organisation".

Remaining in Jamaica, Grant continued both to earn his living as a cook and participate in activism, this time as a labour leader.

In May 1938 the dockworkers of the United Fruit Company were on strike. Bustamante and Grant were known as orators promoting and directing the strike. Both were arrested on 24 May, and remanded in custody by a police inspector. While Bustamante submitted to arrest, St. William Grant protested and was badly beaten. Both were charged with inciting unlawful assembly and obstructing the police, were refused bail and as a form of humiliation were stripped down to their underwear. The events led to further strikes and riots, until Bustamante and Grant were freed by a court on 28 May.

Grant had a falling out with Bustamante and never became part of the Jamaica Labour Party. In 1947 he contested the West Kingston division for the People's National Party in the first Municipal (KSAC) elections after adult suffrage and was beaten by more than 2 to 1. He never resurfaced in any other political contest. However, in 1950 Bustamante recommended that Grant be appointed watchman at the central Housing Authority (later the Ministry of Housing) in which post he remained until his death.

== Honours ==
Grant was awarded the Order of Distinction on National Heroes Day, 1974. Following this, the UNIA organised a special tribute for him on 21 December 1974. He was given a state funeral on 5 September 1977.

== St. William Grant Park ==
The St. William Grant Park in the centre of downtown Kingston, Jamaica is named in honour of William Grant. It was previously called Victoria Park in honour of Queen Victoria of the United Kingdom, being renamed shortly after Grant's death.

Statues in the park include Queen Victoria of the United Kingdom, Norman Manley, Alexander Bustamante, Charles Metcalfe, 1st Baron Metcalfe and Edward Jordan, the first black Mayor of the City of Kingston (1854-1866).
