= Richard Hill (activist) =

Jamaican zoologist, botanist, ornithologist and politician (1795–1872)

Richard Hill (1795–1872), was a Jamaican lawyer and leader of the free people of colour, when they campaigned for equal rights in the early nineteenth century. In addition to his legal practice, Hill was the island's first resident naturalist and ornithologist, a poet, and an educator, as well as an administrator.

== Background ==
Richard Hill was born in Montego Bay on 1 May 1795, to a white merchant of the same name, who migrated to the Colony of Jamaica from Lincolnshire. His mother was of mixed race, being part East Indian and part African. The couple also had two daughters, named Ann and Jane.

Richard's father was an opponent of the system of slavery that dominated Jamaican life in the early nineteenth century. He made his son promise to fight for the cause of freedom and to never rest until the civil disabilities under which black people suffered had been entirely removed, and slavery abolished.

His parents sent young Richard to be educated in England, where he attended the Elizabethan Grammar School in Horncastle. In 1818, his father died, and Richard returned to Jamaica to take possession of his father's property.

== Campaigning for equal rights for free coloureds ==
In 1823, Hill joined the campaign by free coloureds in Jamaica for equal rights with white people in the island.

In 1813, free coloureds, under the leadership of John Campbell, had succeeded in getting restrictions removed on their ability to inherit property worth more than £2000, and their right to navigate their own vessels in Jamaican waters.

In the next decade, they campaigned for more rights, including the right to testify in Jamaican courts of law. During this time, Hill had spent two years in Hispaniola investigating social conditions there on behalf of the Anti-Slavery Society. Hill and other future leaders of the free coloureds movement, such as Edward Jordon, joined the campaign when the Jamaican colonial authorities arrested two leading free coloured businessmen, Louis Celeste Lecesne, and his brother-in-law John Escoffery, and deported them from the island.

In 1827, Hill was the architect of a petition to the House of Commons which asked for free coloureds to have equal rights with white people.

In 1830, thanks to the agitation of people like Hill, the Jamaican Assembly finally gave free coloureds the right to vote in elections and allowed them to play a part in the political life of the island.

== Emancipation and apprenticeship ==
In 1832, the governor appointed Hill as the justice of the peace for Trelawny Parish.

In 1834, the new governor, Howe Browne, 2nd Marquess of Sligo, appointed a number of stipendiary magistrates to supervise the running of the Apprenticeship, and Hill was one of those appointees. The Apprenticeship took place during the latter half of the 1830s. Hill was intensely critical of how badly white plantation owners treated their black apprentices. Governor Sligo then appointed Hill as Head of the Department of the Stipendiary Magistrates. Hill was the first mixed-race man to be appointed to such an important government post in the Colony of Jamaica. The island's white planters resented this appointment, and constantly attacked him through their newspapers.

However, the abolitionist James Phillippo described Hill, during his appointment, as "an honour to the Government of the country." Abolitionists James Thome and J.H. Kimball met Hill when he was head of the Stipendiary Magistrates, and they spoke highly of his abilities. Hill was arguably the first person of colour to be appointed to a senior government position in colonial Jamaica.

== After emancipation ==
Hill was deeply concerned about the education of the poor, and he played a role in establishing a number of elementary schools for the children of black peasants.

Between 1837 and 1838, Hill was elected to the Assembly as a representative of the parishes of St James and Trelawny.

In 1840, the British government offered Hill the post of lieutenant-governor of St Lucia, but he turned it down in order to devote his time to his Jamaican government duties, and his work in natural history.

From 1855-65, Hill served as a member of the Privy Council. In 1851, when Jamaica suffered from a cholera epidemic, Hill used his botanical knowledge to save a number of lives.

In 1846, Hill completed, with the Englishman P.H. Gosse (then living in Jamaica) a revised list of Jamaican birds, identifying about 184 species. The title-pages of Gosse's classic Birds of Jamaica (1847) and Naturalist's Sojourn in Jamaica (1851) state: "Assisted by Richard Hill". After he returned to England, Gosse introduced Charles Darwin to Hill, who corresponded with him to learn more about Jamaica's natural history.

Hill wrote and published at least four books, including A Week at Port Royal (Kingston: 1855) and Lights and Shadows of Jamaica's History (Kingston: 1859), and the pamphlet The Books of Moses, How Say You, True or Not True?.

== Death ==
Hill never married, and died in 1872 at the age of 78.
