= Edward Jordon =

Campaigner for equal rights in Jamaica

Edward Jordon (1800–1869), or Edward Jordan, was a leading campaigner for equal rights for free people of color in Jamaica during the nineteenth century.

== Background ==
Edward was born in the Colony of Jamaica on 6 December 1800, the son of a white man from Barbados with the same name, and a Jamaican black woman named Grace. Jordon found employment as a clerk in the firm of James Brydon, a Kingston merchant, who later terminated Jordon's service because he objected to the free coloured's growing participation in the campaign for equal rights for Jamaica's free people of colour. Jordon wrote in reply, "I regret to learn that my political sentiments should, in your opinion, render a separation necessary."

== Campaigner for equal rights ==
In 1823, the free coloureds of Jamaica presented a petition to the Jamaican Assembly asking for restrictions placed upon them to be lifted, and that free people of colour be allowed to testify in a court of law. However, the Assembly rejected the petition, and continued to deny free coloureds equal rights. The Jamaican colonial government deported the leaders of the free coloureds, Louis Celeste Lecesne and John Escoffery, in an attempt to destroy the movement. These two prominent leaders of the movement were considered by the British colonial government to be Haitian. However, young Jordon joined the movement at this time, becoming a member of the Kingston Coloured Committee. His name is first mentioned in the minutes of a committee meeting on 12 May 1823.

Jordon wanted to start a newspaper, but a lack of finance prevented him from doing so. Instead, together with another leader of the community of free people of colour, Robert Osborn (Jamaica), they started a bookshop. In 1828, from the success of this bookshop, Jordon and Osborn launched their own newspaper, The Watchman. Unlike other newspapers, which expressed the views of white planters, The Watchman presented issues of importance to the Jamaican free coloureds, and it forged ties with the humanitarian movement and the Anti-Slavery Society in England.

In 1827, a petition was presented by another free coloured leader, Richard Hill (Jamaica), to the House of Commons. In 1830, when Jordon and his colleagues presented another petition to the Jamaican Assembly, enough pressure was brought to bear to grant free coloureds the rights to vote and to run for public office.

== Arrest ==
During the Christmas period of 1831, an educated slave and Baptist deacon named Samuel Sharpe led a slave rebellion that became known as the Baptist War. The colonial authorities suppressed the revolt with great brutality, and used the opportunity to clamp down on opposition. When The Watchman printed an editorial calling on the Jamaican authorities to "knock off the fetters, and let the oppressed go free", Jordon was arrested and charged with sedition.

Jordon was eventually acquitted of sedition, but he had to spend six months in prison.

After emancipation, Jordon converted The Watchman into The Morning Journal.

== Political career ==
The emancipation of the slaves that The Watchman campaigned for came to fruition when the House of Commons passed an Act abolishing it in 1833. The Act took effect on 1 August 1834, with the creation of the Apprenticeship, which Hill later complained was nothing more than an extension of slavery.

In 1835, Jordon was elected as a member of the Assembly, representing the parish of Kingston. Jordon became a leader of the informal Kings House Party, or Coloured Party, which opposed the interests of the established elite, the Planters Party. Jordon and the Kings House Party successfully opposed attempts by the Planters Party to increase the property qualification for voting, which would have effectively removed a lot of better-off black and coloured voters from the rolls.

Jordon represented Kingston for 30 years, between 1835 and 1865. In 1852, Jordon was appointed to the Legislative Council, which advised the governor. In 1854, Jordon was the first man of colour to be elected mayor of Kingston, a post he held for 14 years. From 1861-4, Jordon was the first non-white man to become speaker of the Assembly.

In 1864, Jordon was appointed receiver general, and a year later, island secretary. In 1865, when the Morant Bay Rebellion took place, governor Edward John Eyre used the opportunity to persuade the Assembly to abolish itself, ending the growing influence of the people of colour in elective politics. The practice of barring non-whites from public office was reinstated. Jordon bitterly opposed this reactionary measure.

== Death and legacy ==
In 1869, Jordon died. In 1875, a statue in his honour was unveiled at what is now St. William Grant Park in Kingston.

The National Library of Jamaica produced a video about the story of Jordon.
