= George Wilson Bridges =

English writer and cleric

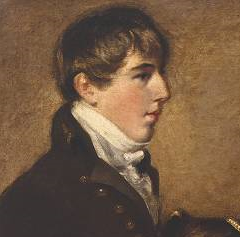
Bridges as a youth in 1804 - detail of a painting by John Constable

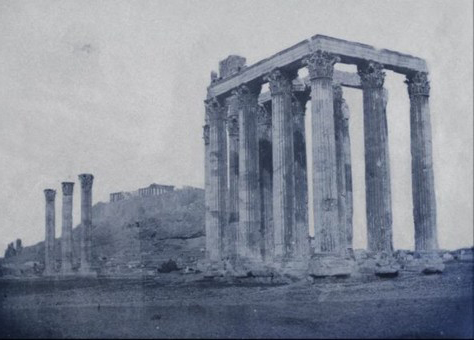
Bridges took this early picture in 1848 of the Temple of Jupiter near the Parthenon.

Reverend George Wilson Bridges (1788 – 1863) was an English writer, photographer and Anglican cleric. After eloping with his wife, he was Rector for the Jamaican parish of St Dorothy until late 1817, and then Manchester from 1817 to 1823. He moved to become rector at the neighbouring parish of St Ann from 1823 to 1837. He published works against William Wilberforce and another book resulted in his London publisher being found guilty of libel against Louis Celeste Lecesne and John Escoffery. After his wife left him, he lost four of their daughters in a boating accident. Bridges went to Canada and returned to England to meet William Fox Talbot and take up photography. He toured around the Mediterranean taking 1,700 early pictures including Egypt, Greece, the Holy Land and Mount Etna erupting. His last parish was in Gloucestershire.

== Life ==
Bridges was born to the banker and merchant George and his wife Mary Bridges. His portrait was captured by John Constable because the painter admired his sister so Constable painted the whole family of eight children at Lawford Place. His future was assured as the son and heir and he trained to be a cleric. He was destined to be the vicar at Bruntingthorpe in Leicestershire, but his first curacy was at St Andrew's Church, Frenze in Norfolk. He caused his first scandal, however, when he eloped to Gretna Green to marry. The marriage to Elizabeth Raby Brooks caused a family split and gave a poor start to the marriage.

In 1814, Bridges made a tour of Europe and had an account of his travels published. Whilst still a member of Trinity College, Oxford, he visited France, Holland, Flanders, Germany and Switzerland.

== Jamaica ==
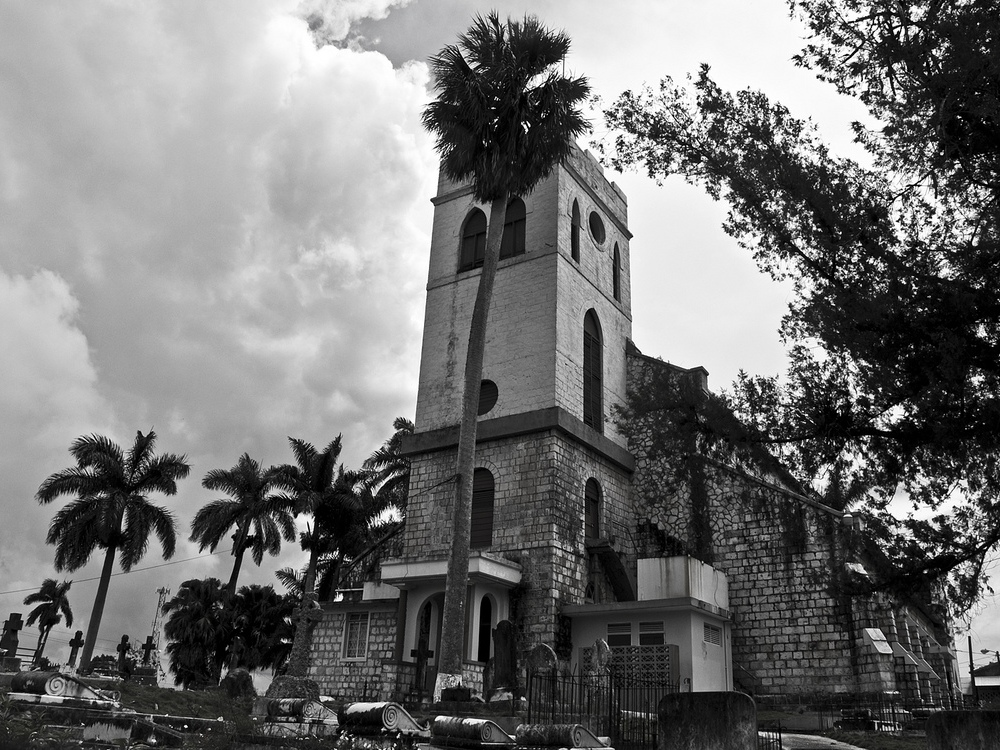
Mandeville Church was the church of Bridges' second parish.

He left for Jamaica in 1816 at the invitation of the Governor of Jamaica where he was reportedly paid very well. For most of 1817 he was Rector of St Dorothy. From late November 1817 he was rector of St Mark's church in Mandeville where he was meant to oversee the Jamaican parish of Manchester from 1817 to 1823. Mandeville was a new settlement with a church that was founded in 1816 and the very first official building that they built was the rector's house. Bridges, with the approval of the vestry – one member dissenting – let this house out as a tavern, and was allowed to retain £240 currency of the £300 annual rent.

In 1823 Bridges became responsible for the neighbouring parish of St Ann. Bridges had arrived in Jamaica with no money at all and by 1823 he was earning over £1000 a year. £400 of this was his salary but the majority came from fees he charged for conducting funerals, marriages and baptisms. He performed thousands of baptisms for money that he obtained from slaves. He was the rector of this parish until 1837.

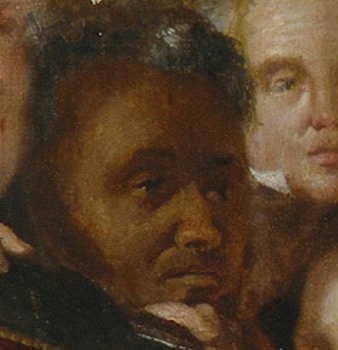
Lecesne in England after the libel case

Bridges worked in Jamaica where his books and publications caused difficulties. His annals, volume 2 was the subject of a libel case thousands of miles away in England. The case revolved around two men, Louis Celeste Lecesne and his brother-in-law John Escoffery, who were thrown off the island using powers under an Aliens Act. His libel against Lecesne and Escoffery was that Bridges wrote that they "were impatient to sheathe their daggers in the breasts of its white inhabitants". The case resulted in the publisher having to withdraw the second volume of the book. With the publisher's assistance the volume was amended and reissued. This was not the last time that Bridges' behaviour would be discussed in London.

Bridges spoke out against the abolition of slavery and he was an enemy of Methodist missionaries. There was a parliamentary enquiry into a flogging that Bridges had given to a slave as punishment for attending a Methodist meeting. The case was raised in 1830 in the British House of Commons by Henry Brougham who reported that a girl had been hit by Bridges, flogged by two men at Thomas(sic) Wilson Bridges' instruction. The punishment was for failing to carry out an order. She had complained but the local committee had decided by fourteen to four to take no further action.

Bridges later founded a group who tried to throw the missionaries out of Jamaica.

In 1834 Bridges' wife left him, taking their son, Henry, for company. Elizabeth left for Britain leaving Bridges with four children to parent. At the time of this estrangement, they had six children. The last child was in England. After some months Bridges returned to England to find his wife and his missing son and daughter. He did not return to Jamaica for over twelve months and he spent some time with Somerset Lowry-Corry who was Earl Belmore and Jamaica's former governor. In February 1836 he received £87 9s 4d as compensation for the financial loss of three Jamaican slaves. This was as a result of the abolition of slavery in the British empire. In 1837 he met the leading British abolitionist Joseph Sturge and it was noted that there was no hostility despite Bridges earlier position.

== Canada ==
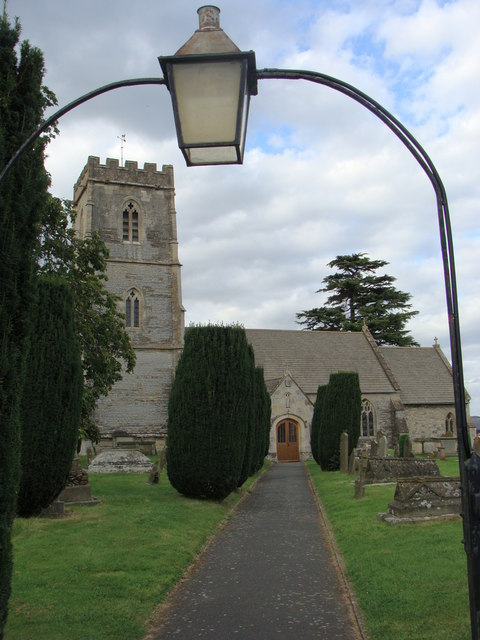
Bridge's church in Maisemore

In 1837 the separated couple were to face a disaster when a boat accident in St Ann's Bay, Jamaica resulted in the loss of all four of their daughters. Some small consolation was that their son was saved. Bridges and his son turned their backs on England and on Jamaica and set out for Canada. Bridges and his son were there for a number of years and they had an octagonal house built at Lake Rice. In 1842, William Bridges was ill so they returned to England.

== William Fox Talbot ==
Bridges took a new job as rector of St Giles Church in Maisemore in Gloucestershire. where William attended school. It was through a friend of William that Bridges became acquainted with the Talbot family after admiring one of William Fox Talbot's publications. This was the first book printed with photographs and it was made possible by Fox Talbot's invention of the calotype. Bridges became intrigued by the calotype process and persuaded Talbot to support him with photographic paper for a major project. Moreover Talbot allowed Bridges to be instructed in its use even though an American patent was some years away.

In 1846 Bridges lent his wooden house at Rice Lake in Ontario called Wolf Tower to Catharine Parr Traill. This may have been because he had little need for this house as, for the next seven years he was to wander through Europe and north Africa, taking photographs using the novel calotype technique.

In 1847 it was recorded that the Jamaican government would give 30 pounds annually to a Mr Stewart towards the upkeep of the infant son of the Reverend George Wilson Bridges. No explanation is offered. However, the government also awarded 60 pounds per year to Bridges himself for 25 years' service and because he left because of a "calamitous situation". These monies must have benefited Bridges on his travels.

Bridges' first stop was Paris, where he had a state of the art camera made for himself by an optician named Charles Chevalier. It was there that he met Richard Haight, an American, who used his camera to take pictures in England.

In Malta, Bridges met a fellow clergyman Rev. Calvert R. Jones and an entrepreneur cousin of William Fox Talbot's, Christopher Rice Mansel Talbot, who was touring the Mediterranean in his yacht, Galatea. Both of these had been asked to assist Bridges by Fox Talbot. This was not entirely altruistic as Bridges was sending one copy of each exposure back to Fox Talbot so that he could develop the pictures. In return Bridges received more prepared paper.

In 1851 he was in Egypt but during his travels he also visited Italy, Sicily, Greece, Turkey, the Holy Land and the rest of North Africa. Some of the earliest successful photographs in these countries were taken by Bridges. The negatives from these pictures can achieve several thousand pounds each at auction.

== Later publications ==
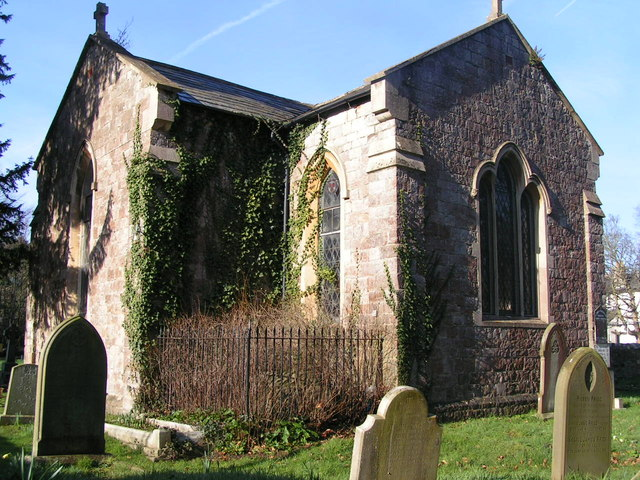
Bridges church in Beachley

Bridges became secretary to the Bishop of Bristol, James Monk in 1852 until Monk gave him the position at the village and ferry port of Beachley. In return for forty pounds each year Bridges took care of the Gloucestershire parish and St John's church. Bridges published a number of publications based on the 1,700 negatives that he had gathered. He had tried to sell many whilst in Malta, but there was little profit.

When his estranged wife Elizabeth died in 1862, he published a book entitled Outlines and Notes of Twenty-Nine Years. The 29 years refers to the time from when they parted until her death.

Bridges died on 20 September 1863, while still at Beachley parish.

== Works ==
- Alpine Sketches, comprised in a short tour through parts of Holland..., 1814
- A Voice from Jamaica; in reply to William Wilberforce, London, 1823
- Dreams of Dulocracy: or, The puritanical obituary, 1824
- The Driving System, 1824
- The Annals of Jamaica, Volume 2, 1828
- Outlines and Notes of Twenty-Nine Years
- Palestine As It Is: in a series of photographic views, 1858
