= Monocropping =

Growing the same crop each year

In agriculture, monocropping is the practice of growing a single crop year after year on the same land. Maize, soybeans, and wheat are three common crops often monocropped. Monocropping is also referred to as continuous cropping, as in "continuous corn." Monocropping allows for farmers to have consistent crops throughout their entire farm. They can plant only the most profitable crop, use the same seed, pest control, machinery, and growing method on their entire farm, which may increase overall farm profitability.

Diversity can be added both in time, as with a crop rotation or sequence, or in space, with a polyculture or intercropping (see table below). Note that the distinction between monoculture and polyculture is not the same as between monocropping and intercropping. The first two describe diversity in space, as does intercropping. Monocropping and crop rotation describe diversity over time. This is frequently a source of confusion, even in scientific journal articles.

Diversity of crops in space and time; monocultures and polycultures, and rotations of both.
			Diversity in time		
			Low	Higher	
			Low	Cyclic	Dynamic (non-cyclic)
Diversity in space	Low	Monoculture, one species in a field	Continuous monoculture, monocropping	Crop rotation (rotation of monocultures)	Sequence of monocultures
Diversity in space	Higher	Polyculture, two or more species intermingled in a field (intercropping)	Continuous polyculture	Rotation of polycultures	Sequence of polycultures

== Strategy ==
Monocropping as an agricultural strategy tends to emphasize the use of expensive specialized farm equipment—an important component in realizing its efficiency goals. This can lead to an increased dependency and reliance on expensive machinery that cannot be produced locally and may need to be financed. This can make a significant change in the economics of farming in regions that are accustomed to self-sufficiency in agricultural production. In addition, political complications may ensue when these dependencies extend across national boundaries.

The controversies surrounding monocropping are complex, but traditionally the core issues concern the balance between its advantages in increasing short-term food production—especially in hunger-prone regions—and its disadvantages with respect to long-term land stewardship and the fostering of local economic independence and ecological sustainability. Advocates of monocropping believe polyculture production would be costly and unable to feed everyone, while critics of monocropping dispute these claims and attribute them to corporate special interest groups, citing the damage that monocropping causes to societies and the environment. Many farmers practice neither monocropping nor polyculture, but divide their farms into large plots and rotate crops between the plots to get some of the benefits purported of both systems.

== Difficulties ==
A difficulty with monocropping is that the solution to one problem—whether economic, environmental or political—may result in a cascade of other problems. For example, a well-known concern is pesticides and fertilizers seeping into surrounding soil and groundwater from extensive monocropped acreage in the U.S. and abroad. This issue, especially with respect to the pesticide DDT, played an important role in focusing public attention on ecology and pollution issues during the 1960s when Rachel Carson published her landmark book Silent Spring.

Journalist Michael Pollan argues that monocropping not only depletes fertile land, but it results in overproduction of certain agricultural crops. Corn is a primary example, as its overproduction drove its pricing downward. The overproduction for low prices drives many small farms out of business, as many small farms cannot compete with government-subsidized agricultural productions. This ironically, as Pollan argues, leads to "food deserts" in which farmers produce a certain crop that is modified to be inedible and serve another purpose; this, coupled with low government payments, drives farmers and their families into hunger.

Soil depletion is also a negative effect of mono-cropping. Crop rotation plays an important role in replenishing soil nutrients, especially atmospheric nitrogen converted to usable forms by nitrogen-fixing bacteria that form a relationship with legumes such as soybeans. Some legumes can also be used as cover crops or planted in fallow fields. In addition, monocropping encourages pesticide resistance and pest evolution and so rotating crops performs an important role in preventing pathogen and pest build-up. There are however a few diseases which are less severe in a monocropping system, like take-all in wheat, as the population of an organism which feeds on the disease causing pathogen grows over repeated years of the presence of the pathogen.

== Soil ecology ==
While economically a very efficient system, allowing for specialization in equipment and crop production, monocropping is also controversial, as it damages the soil ecology (including depletion or reduction in diversity of soil nutrients) and provide an unbuffered niche for parasitic species, increasing crop vulnerability to opportunistic insects, plants, and microorganisms. The result is a more fragile ecosystem with an increased dependency on pesticides and artificial fertilizers. The concentrated presence of a single cultivar, genetically adapted with a single resistance strategy, presents a situation in which an entire crop can be wiped out very quickly by a single opportunistic species. An example of this would be the Great Famine of Ireland in 1845–1849.

== Deforestation ==
Under certain circumstances monocropping can lead to deforestation or the displacement of indigenous peoples. For example, since 1970 the Amazon Rainforest has lost nearly one fifth of its forest cover. A main cause of this deforestation is local farmers clearing land for more crops. In Colombia, the need for more farming land is causing the displacement of large populations of peasants.

== See also ==
- Intensive farming
- Monoculture
