= Robert Osborn (newspaper editor) =

Jamaican newspaper editor

Robert Osborn (1800–1878) was a Jamaican newspaper editor and campaigner for equal rights for free people of color.

== Campaigner for equal rights ==
Robert was born on 5 April 1800, the son of Kean Osborn, a white Jamaican planter of Scottish descent, and a woman of colour. Kean Osborn served as speaker of the House of Assembly of Jamaica in 1798. When Kean died in 1820, his will made no provision for his mixed-race illegitimate son, Robert.

In 1828, he co-founded The Watchman along with Edward Jordon. This Jamaican newspaper campaigned for equal rights for free coloureds in colonial Jamaica, and soon became a voice for the anti-slavery movement in Jamaica. After emancipation, Jordon and Osborn changed the name of their newspaper to The Morning Journal.

In 1830, together with Jordon, he presented a petition to the Jamaican Assembly, which eventually agreed to grant free coloureds the rights to vote and to run for public office.

== Political career ==
In 1832, Osborn won a seat on the Kingston Common Council. In 1835, he was elected to the Assembly, representing the parish of Saint Andrew. He remained in the Assembly until it was abolished in 1865, following the Morant Bay Rebellion.

In 1833, Osborn unsuccessfully ran in Saint Andrew Parish, Jamaica, losing by the margin of 74-22, but he reversed that result two years later.

Osborn was an unabashed supporter of free people of colour. He was more radical than most members of the Assembly, including Jordon. In 1835, on winning his election in St Andrew, he gave a speech, saying, "I have been elected by a party, and it shall be my duty, if I live, to take my seat in the House of the Assembly to watch over the interest of that party, to promote their welfare, their honour and to ensure to them pecuniary situations." He later backtracked from that speech, under pressure from the governor.

== Removed from public office ==
In 1861, Osborn disagreed with the governor, Charles Henry Darling, over some of policy decisions, and he made his opposition public through an editorial in The Morning Journal. Osborn supported a petition by over 100 of his constituents over destitute conditions and a lack of medical provisions. As a result, Darling removed him from the Privy Council.

In 1865, when governor Edward John Eyre abolished the Assembly following the Morant Bay Rebellion, Osborn strongly expressed his disapproval of the curtailment of Jamaica's democratic institutions. Osborn observed that, "...the wrongs of Africa are eventually be vindicated in this hemisphere." He predicted that, "...in the years to come, which none of us can live to see, the government of the colonies will fall into the hands of the blacks."

== Death ==
Osborn died on 1 April 1878. His funeral was held at the Half Way Tree Church the next day.
