= Cattawood Springs =

- Village; originally Maroon
- Location within Jamaica
- Coordinates: 18.0667°N 76.4333°W
- Country: Jamaica
- Parish: Portland

Cattawood Springs is a place in Portland Parish, Jamaica located at latitude 18 04' 00", longitude 76 26' 00".

Originally this was a Maroon settlement. Its name probably derives from the Twi word katá which means to cover conceal or protect.

== History ==
Cattawood Springs was a place of refuge for Queen Nanny and the Jamaican Maroons during the First Maroon War, especially when the militias captured Nanny Town. However, under Nanny's leadership, the Windward Maroons mounted attacks from Cotterwood, and recaptured Nanny Town on more than one occasion. The Windward Maroons made overtures to join forces with Cudjoe towards the end of the 1730s. After the Windward Maroons signed a peace treaty with governor Edward Trelawny in 1740, Queen Nanny's Maroons abandoned Nanny Town, and resettled in New Nanny Town, which was eventually renamed Moore Town.

Some of the original inhabitants left Cattawood in 1730 to join up with Cudjoe in Cudjoe's Town (Trelawny Town). According to one story, a group of one hundred men women and children went to join Cudjoe, and they were probably members of the group led by Captain Cuffee, who was one of Cudjoe's deputies at the signing of the 1739 peace treaty with the Leeward Maroons. They retained their name subsequently settling in Cotterwood in Saint Elizabeth Parish.
