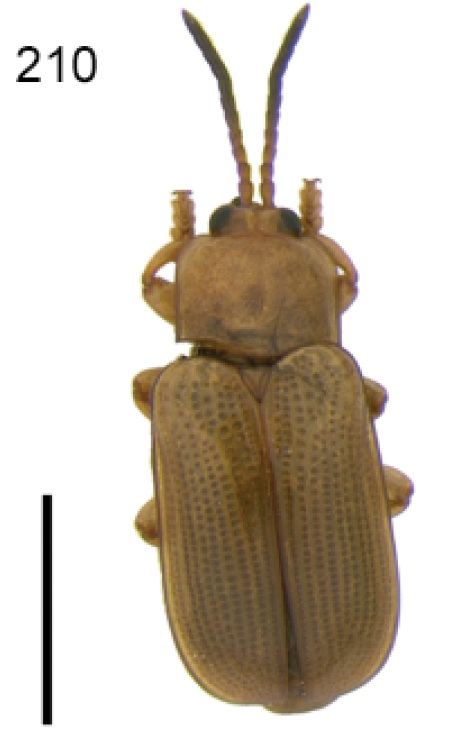

Scientific classification
- Kingdom: Animalia
- Phylum: Arthropoda
- Class: Insecta
- Order: Coleoptera
- Suborder: Polyphaga
- Infraorder: Cucujiformia
- Family: Chrysomelidae
- Genus: Cephaloleia
- Species: C. placida

Binomial name
- Cephaloleia placida Baly, 1885

Synonyms
- Cephaloleia placida variicornis Weise, 1910

= Cephaloleia placida =

Species of beetle

Cephaloleia placida is a species of beetle of the family Chrysomelidae. It is found in Colombia, Costa Rica and Panama.

== Description ==
Adults reach a length of about 6.1–7.1 mm. Adults are reddish-brown, with the eyes and antennae (except antennomeres 1–2) darker.

== Biology ==
Adults have been collected on Heliconia and Renealmia species (including Renealmia alpinia and Renealmia cernua), as well as on Alpinia purpurata and Hedychium coronarium.
