= Nanny of the Maroons =

Leader of Windward Maroons in Jamaica (c. 1686 – c. 1760)

The Right Excellent Nanny of the Maroons ONH
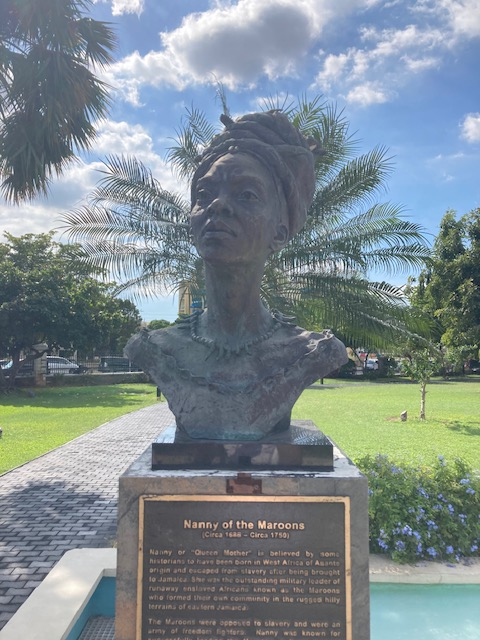
- Bust of Nanny of the Maroons in Emancipation Park in Kingston, Jamaica
- Born: c. 1686
- Died: c. 1760 (aged 73–74)
- Occupations: Jamaican Maroon; guerilla; revolutionary
- Known for: 18th-century leader of the Windward Maroons
- Military career
- Commands: Windward Maroons
- Conflicts: First Maroon War

Nanny of the Maroons ONH (c. 1686 – c. 1760), also known as Queen Nanny or Granny Nanny, was a Jamaican revolutionary and leader of the Jamaican Maroons. She led a community of formerly-enslaved escapees, the majority of them West African in descent, called the Windward Maroons, along with their children and families. At the beginning of the 18th century, under the leadership of Nanny, the Windward Maroons fought a guerrilla war lasting many years against British authorities in the Colony of Jamaica, in what became known as the First Maroon War.

Much of what is known about Nanny comes from oral history, as little textual evidence exists. According to Maroon legend, Queen Nanny was born in 1686 and was an Asante from Asanteman, who was taken into slavery by the British.

During the years of warfare, the British suffered significant losses in their encounters with the Windward Maroons of eastern Jamaica. Maroons attributed their success against the British to the successful use of supernatural powers by Nanny, while historians believe that the Maroons' mastery of guerrilla warfare and vast knowledge of the natural terrain played a significant role in their successes. Having failed to defeat them on the battlefield, the British sued the Maroons for peace, signing a treaty with them on 20 April 1740. The treaty stopped the hostilities, provided state-sanctioned freedom for the Maroons, and granted 500 acres (202 ha) of land to Nanny and her followers. The village built through that land grant still stands, and is called Moore Town or the "New" Nanny Town. Modern members of Moore Town celebrate 20 April 1740 as a holiday, known informally in places today as "4/20" or "four-twenty".

In 1975, the government of Jamaica declared Nanny their only female national hero by celebrating her success as a leader. Her image is printed on the Jamaican $500 note, which is referred to as a "Nanny".

== The origins of Nanny ==
Illustration of Nanny from the 500 Jamaican dollars banknote

According to a Maroon legend espoused by the Maroons of Accompong Town, Nanny was born into the Asante people of modern-day Ghana. According to several Maroon colonels, her mother's name is Nyankopong. It is possible that this figure was the founder of the Oyoko clan, Antwiwaa Nyame. As Nyankopong is another name for Nyame, and the name Nyame is paired with Antwiwaa. In other words, she is a relative of the Asante ruling class of the Oyoko clan. She and her brother's names were also Acheampong, and both Acheampong and Antwiwaa are Asante-rooted names no other Akan has.

The notion that there are several versions of her early story stems from the fact that Maroons, like most Africans, deify their ancestors and use them as characters in folk tales. She is often the subject of many Maroon stories, and therefore, there are numerous origin stories.

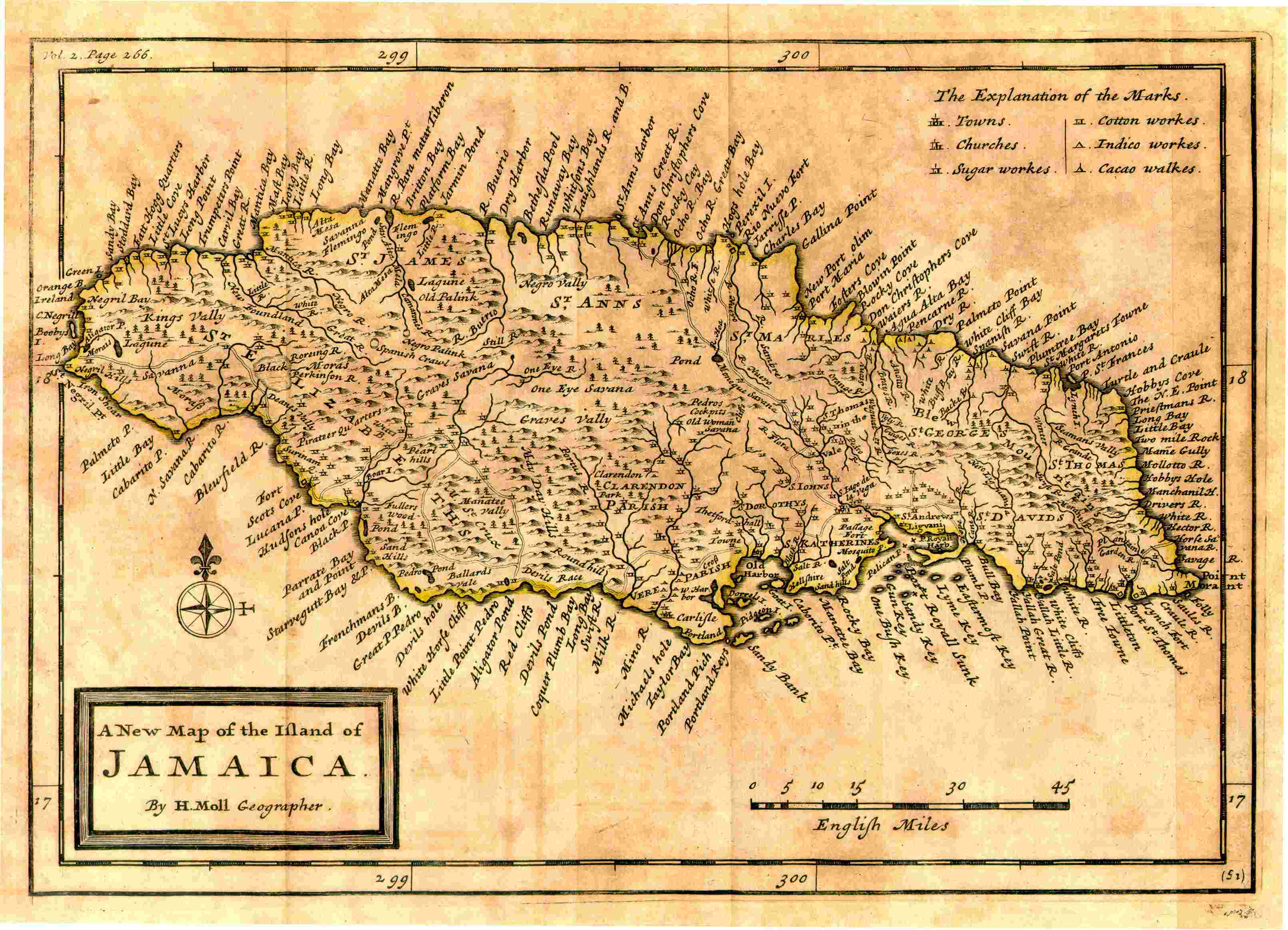
Jamaica in 1717

In one Maroon story, Nanny came to Jamaica as a slave but then escaped, perhaps even jumping off the ship while it was offshore, while her sister Sekesu was enslaved. The legend states that Queen Nanny became the mother of all Maroons, and her sister Sekesu became the mother of all enslaved in Jamaica. The oral traditions about her arrival in Jamaica maintain that she was always free, while Sekesu eventually died free in the mountains with Nanny.

In another story, she came as a free woman who may have even had her slaves. Another version of her life tells that she was of royal African blood and came to Jamaica as a free woman. She may have been married to a Maroon man possibly named Adou, and had one son named Kwashkwaku, nicknamed Granfara Puss. Relatives of poet John Agard claim descent from Nanny.

According to one Maroon legend, Nanny's name was also Sarah "Matilda" Rowe, but that has not been verified. The Rowe family of Jamaica claims direct descent from Nanny. According to oral history, her second husband was named Swipplemento, later known by the Anglicised name of Rose Harris, affectionately called Pa Rose, then Pa Ro, Queen Nanny was known as Shanti Rose or Ma Ro. Oral tradition states that Ro eventually became anglicized as Rowe, though many Maroons of the late 18th century changed their African names for European ones, as they converted to Christianity. Maroon legend states that Nanny was known to have gone by the name Sarah, and sometimes Matilda. Oral history states that she had three children with Swipplemento; two sons Kojo Rowe and Ampong Rowe, and a daughter called Nanny as well.

== The Jamaican Maroons ==
The Maroons are descendants of West Africans, mainly people from the Akan. They were known as Coromantie or Koromantee, and were considered ferocious fighters. A number of the enslaved originated from other regions of Africa, including Nigeria, the Congo and Madagascar. However, at least half of the enslaved African people in Jamaica during the early English colonisation of the island were also Asante in origin, as shown in maternal genetics, linguistics and cultural evidence.

After being brought to Jamaica in the course of the Transatlantic slave trade, many enslaved Africans fled from the oppressive conditions of plantations and formed their own communities of free black people in Jamaica in the rugged, hilly interior of the island. People who escaped from slavery joined these Maroon communities in the mountains of eastern Jamaica, or the Cockpit Country in the west of the island. Up to the 1650s under Spanish rule, enslaved Africans escaped and intermarried with the native islanders, the Taíno or Arawak, in their communities in the Blue Mountains (Jamaica), located in Portland Parish and Saint Thomas Parish, Jamaica, in the eastern end of the island.

Many Maroons were escaped slaves who ran away from their Spanish-owned plantations when the British took the Caribbean island of Jamaica from Spain in 1655. However, many modern-day Maroons believe that the Maroons of Nanny Town belonged to a separate group that existed in the Mountains prior to 1655. They state that Queen Nanny's Maroons date back to the Tainos fleeing to the Blue Mountains when the Spaniards first arrived in Jamaica. Maroon oral history maintains that her family arrived in 1640 and joined the existing Maroons, whose community allegedly existed about 150 years before the Spanish fled Jamaica.

== Windward Maroons ==
In 1655, following the Invasion of Jamaica, the English captured Jamaica from the Spaniards, but many Spanish slaves became free under Spanish Maroon leaders such as Juan de Bolas and Juan de Serras. The Spanish left, freeing their slaves in the process, and they joined the Windward Maroon communities. These formerly enslaved people, with their ranks enhanced with escaped and liberated slaves, became the core of the Windward Maroons. They staged a prolonged fight against English subjugation and enslavement. Later in the 17th century, more slaves escaped joining the two main bands of Windward and Leeward Maroons. By the early 18th century, these Maroon towns were headed respectively by Nanny, who shared the leadership of the eastern Maroons with Quao, and Captain Cudjoe and Accompong in the west. The Windward Maroons fought the British on the east side of the island from their villages in the Blue Mountains of Portland.

The community raised animals, hunted, and grew crops. Maroons at Nanny Town and similar communities survived by sending traders to the nearby market towns to exchange food for weapons and cloth. It was organized very much like a typical Asante society in Africa. From 1655 until they signed peace treaties in 1739 and 1740, these Maroons led most of the slave rebellions in Jamaica, helping to free slaves from the plantations. They raided and then damaged lands and buildings held by plantation owners.

The Maroons were also known for raiding plantations for weapons and food, burning the plantations, and leading freed slaves to join their mountain communities. Nanny was highly successful at organizing plans to free slaves. During a period of 30 years, she was credited with freeing more than 1000 slaves, and helping them to resettle in the Maroon community.

== The First Maroon War ==
By 1720, Nanny and Quao, sometimes called her brother, settled and controlled an area in the Blue Mountains. It was later given the name Nanny Town, and it had a strategic location overlooking Stony River via a 900-foot (270 m) ridge, making a surprise attack by the British very difficult.

Nanny became a folk hero among the Maroons and the slaves. While the British captured Nanny Town on more than one occasion, they were unable to hold on to it, in the wake of numerous guerrilla attacks from the Maroons. The Maroons waged a successful war against the British colonial forces over the course of a decade.

When Nanny Town was abandoned, the Windward Maroons under the command of Nanny moved to New Nanny Town. Between 1728 and 1734, during the First Maroon War, Nanny Town and other Maroon settlements were frequently attacked by British colonial forces. They wanted to stop the raids and believed that the Maroons prevented settlement of the interior. According to some accounts, in 1733 many Maroons of Nanny Town travelled across the island to unite with the Leeward Maroons. In 1734, a Captain Stoddart attacked the remnants of Nanny Town, "situated on one of the highest mountains in the island", via "the only path" available: "He found it steep, rocky, and difficult, and not wide enough to admit the passage of two persons abreast".

In addition to the use of the ravine, resembling what Jamaicans call a "cockpit", the Maroons also used decoys to trick the British into ambushes. A few Maroons would run out into view of the British and then run in the direction of fellow Maroons who were hidden and would attack. After falling into these ambushes several times, the British retaliated. According to planter Bryan Edwards, who wrote his narrative half a century later, Captain Stoddart "found the huts in which the negroes were asleep", and "fired upon them so briskly, that many were slain in their habitations". However, recent evidence shows that the number of Windward Maroons killed by Stoddart in his attack on Nanny Town was fewer than ten.

== Military tactics ==
The Windward Maroons succeeded against a much superior and better-armed enemy. One of their advantages over the British was their long-range communications capability. They pioneered the use of a cow horn called an abeng. This horn with a hole drilled in one end was used for long-range communications. Its signals allowed Maroon lookouts to communicate over great distances, and they were not understood by the British, who had no similar communications capability.

Nanny's troops were masters of camouflage. The soldiers were so proficient at disguising their location that the British would circulate tales of trees in the forest becoming alive and cutting one's head off. Besides the physical aspects of camouflage, the Maroons became experts in slowing their breathing so as not to reveal their presence to someone in their vicinity. The Maroons also developed ways of creating stealthy fires that were not readily visible.

The Windward Maroons were innovators in guerrilla warfare. They used the knowledge of the terrain and chosen positions in their fight against the British. Their village was located in rugged territory with only one way in. That one way in was a narrow path that was only wide enough for one person. Soldiers trying to attack arrayed in a single file were easily ambushed. To heighten the enemy's fear, Nanny's forces never killed all of the attacking forces. She would always allow a remnant to live to return to base to relay the story of the encounter.

== Treaty ==
When the British signed a treaty with Cudjoe in 1739, this success allowed them to offer a less favourable treaty to the Windward Maroons. Representatives of the British governor in Jamaica signed a treaty with the Windward Maroons in 1740, between the colonial authorities and Quao, who later became one of the leaders of Crawford's Town. This treaty between the colonial authorities and Quao's Maroons made no mention of how much land would be allocated to Crawford's Town. As a result, a number of disputes occurred between planters and the Maroons of Crawford's Town, and later the succeeding towns of Charles Town and Scott's Hall. In response, the Assembly of Jamaica often tried to resolve the land disputes in favour of the Maroons to keep the peace.

In addition, later that year, there was a separate land grant signed with Nanny and the Maroons of Nanny Town, which granted "Nanny and the people now residing with her and their heirs ... a certain parcel of Land containing five hundred acres in the parish of Portland". This land patent consisted of 500 acres (2.4 km^{2}) of land granted by the government to the Maroons of New Nanny Town under a separate 1740 document ending the First Maroon War. The rebuilt Nanny Town, later called Moore Town was built on that location. In 1781, the Assembly agreed to purchase an additional 500 acres from neighbouring planter Charles Douglas to increase Moore Town's communal land to 1,000 acres.

The New Nanny Town Maroons, like those of Cudjoe and Quao, agreed not to harbour new runaway slaves, but to help catch them for bounties. The Maroons were also expected to fight for the British in the case of an attack from the French or Spanish. In signing treaties with the Maroons, the British not only made a truce with a troublesome foe but also enlisted that foe in capturing runaway slaves. The colonial authorities initially recognised two Maroon towns: Crawford's Town and Cudjoe's Town, later to be renamed Trelawny Town. Eventually, there were five Maroon towns in the 18th century – Accompong Town, Trelawny Town, Charles Town, Scott's Hall, and Nanny Town (later Moore Town) – living under their own chiefs with a British supervisor in each town. In exchange, they agreed not to harbour new runaway slaves, but to help catch them for bounties.

== Moore Town and Tacky's War ==
New Nanny Town was renamed Moore Town, possibly in 1760 after the governor Sir Henry Moore, 1st Baronet, during Tacky's War, which the Maroons helped to suppress. The first official reference to Moore Town in the colonial records was in 1760.

By 1760, New Nanny Town, now known as Moore Town, was under the command of a white superintendent named Charles Swigle, and the Maroon leaders of that town, Clash and Sambo, reported to Swigle when the superintendent commanded their forces against slave rebels in Tacky's War. It is possible that Nanny had already died by this time.

== A Spiritual Woman ==
Many in her community attributed Nanny's leadership skills to her Obeah powers. Obeah is an African-derived religion that is still practised in Suriname, Jamaica, Trinidad and Tobago, Guyana, Barbados, Belize and other Caribbean countries. It is associated with both good and bad magic, charms, luck, and with mysticism in general. In some Caribbean nations, aspects of Obeah have survived through synthesis with Christian symbolism and practice introduced by European colonials and slave owners.

According to Maroon oral history, Nanny's success in defending her people against the colonial forces was often attributed to her mysterious supernatural powers. According to legend, Nanny had magical powers and could catch bullets and then redirect them back at the people who shot at her.

Another Maroon legend claims that if any straight-haired, white man goes to the original Nanny Town, he is immediately struck dead.

== Death ==
In the Journal of the Assembly of Jamaica, 29–30 March 1733, is a citation for "resolution, bravery and fidelity" awarded to "loyal slaves [...] under the command of Captain Sambo", namely William Cuffee, who was rewarded for having fought the Maroons in the First Maroon War and who is called "a very good party Negro, having killed Nanny, the rebels old obeah woman". These hired soldiers were known as "Black Shots".

However, it is unlikely that Cuffee killed the Nanny who ran Nanny Town, since there is evidence that Moore Town was granted to her people under her leadership in 1740.

Some claim that Queen Nanny lived to be an old woman, dying of natural causes in the 1760s. The exact date of her death remains a mystery. Part of the confusion is that "Nanny" is an honorific title, and many high-ranking women were called that in Maroon Town. However, the Maroons are adamant that there was only one "Queen Nanny."

According to Maroon oral history, Nanny's remains are buried at "Bump Grave" in Moore Town.

== Accolades ==
Nanny is celebrated in Jamaica and abroad:

- The government of Jamaica declared Queen Nanny a National Hero in 1975. Colonel C. L. G. Harris of Moore Town, then a Senator in Jamaica's upper house, was the driving force behind the move to recognise Nanny as a National Heroine.
- Her portrait is featured on the $500 Jamaican dollar bill, which is colloquially referred to as a "Nanny".
- Nanny is celebrated every October on Jamaican National Heroes Day.
- Nanny's Monument is located in Moore Town, Portland, Jamaica.
- Nannyville Gardens, a residential community located in Kingston, Jamaica, was founded in 1977 and named after her.
- The Gilder Lehrman Center for the Study of Slavery, Resistance and Abolition at Yale University in the United States uses Nanny's portrait in its logo. The Center sponsors research and conferences on slavery in the Americas.
- A ship in the Jamaica Defence Force Coast Guard is named after Nanny. HMJS Nanny of the Maroons.
- Jamaican-American photographer Renee Cox created an installation dedicated to Queen Nanny entitled, Queen Nanny of the Maroons for the 2006 Jamaican Biennial. Cox's installation received the Aaron Matalon Award, the most significant award possible at the biennial.
- Nanny is featured in "Rise Up: Resistance, Revolution, Abolition" at the Fitzwilliam Museum of Cambridge University during 2025, which commemorated resistance leaders and revolutionaries across the Caribbean.
- In March 2025, the Belgrade Theatre, Coventry, UK, announced a new musical, Nanny of the Maroons, based on Nanny's life story. As part of the theatre's vision to be a people-first theatre where diversity powers storytelling, the show will engage with 1000 people from the local community to co-create the production. Nanny of the Maroons will open in Coventry in Spring 2027 before touring.

== Bibliography ==
- Campbell, Mavis Christine (1990). The Maroons of Jamaica, 1655–1796 : a history of resistance, collaboration & betrayal. Trenton, N.J.: Africa World Press. ISBN 978-0865430969. OCLC 21894759.
- Gottlieb, Karla Lewis (2000). The mother of us all : a history of Queen Nanny, leader of the Windward Jamaican Maroons. Trenton, NJ: Africa World Press. ISBN 978-0865435643. OCLC 38061550.
- Mendez Mendez, Serafín; Cueto, Gail; Rodríguez Deynes, Neysa (2003). Notable Caribbeans and Caribbean Americans : a biographical dictionary. Westport, Conn.: Greenwood Press. pp. 324–325. ISBN 978-0313314438. OCLC 46959797.
- Siva, Michael (2018). After the Treaties: A Social, Economic and Demographic History of Maroon Society in Jamaica, 1739-1842 (PDF) (PhD). Southampton: Southampton University.
- Tuelon, Alan (December 1973). "Nanny – Maroon Chieftainess". Caribbean Quarterly. 19 (4): 20–27. doi:10.1080/00086495.1973.11829168. JSTOR 23050240.
