= Samuel Grant =

Jamaican officer (1741–1808)

Samuel Grant (1741–1808) was a Jamaican officer of the Jamaican Maroons who made a career out of hunting runaway slaves. He was from Charles Town, Jamaica.

== Tried for killing sea captain ==
Grant first came to prominence as a member of a team of Windward Maroons that came under the command of Scott's Hall officer Davy the Maroon, who may have been his father.

In 1774, Grant allegedly killed a white sea captain named Townshend and his black slave while hunting runaways near Hellshire Beach, and then fled to Moore Town for refuge. Admiral George Rodney, who was in Kingston at the time, sent two warships to Port Antonio in response to the incident.

There was a stand-off as the Maroons stood by Grant, but the white Superintendent-General, Robert Brereton, persuaded the Moore Town Maroons to hand over Grant, who stood trial at Spanish Town. However, much to the surprise of local planters, Grant was eventually acquitted of the murder of Townshend.

== Hunter of runaway slaves ==
Grant returned to Charles Town, where he rose through the ranks of the Maroon officer class, eventually becoming a major and nominally leader of the Maroon town, a post he held for many years. In 1781, Grant was a part of the Maroon party that successfully hunted and killed the notorious leader of a community of runaway slaves, Three Fingered Jack.

Grant made a career hunting runaway slaves for neighbouring planters, but in 1797 he lodged a complaint about the length of time it took for the colonial authorities to pay him his rewards.

== Second Maroon War ==
During the Second Maroon War of 1795–6, the Windward Maroons remained neutral, but the governor, Alexander Lindsay, 6th Earl of Balcarres, ordered Grant to lead a party of Charles Town Maroons to Kingston to await his orders. However, an obeah man advised Grant that Balcarres planned to deport them, and Grant, suspicious of the governor, led his men back to their Maroon town in the Blue Mountains. Balcarres later admitted that he had indeed planned to deport the Windward Maroons.

From the 1790s until his death, Grant was the leading Maroon officer in Charles Town, first as a major and then promoted to colonel.

== Later life and death ==
In 1807, the colonial authorities exposed a slave conspiracy, and one of the informers claimed that the Charles Town Maroons were conspirators. Grant, who was the elderly leader of Charles Town, denied the charges. William Anderson Orgill, the magistrate who investigated the case, dismissed the evidence of the slave conspirators, and chose to believe Grant's expressions of loyalty.

Grant died in 1808.
