= Davy the Maroon =

Captain Davy (d. late 1700s) was an eighteenth-century Maroon officer at Scott's Hall who gained notoriety by killing Coromantyne Tacky, the leader of Tacky's Revolt, the most dangerous slave rebellion in eighteenth-century Jamaica.

== Tacky's Revolt ==
In the 1760 slave rebellion, also known as Tacky's War, the British colonial authorities summoned the Jamaican Maroons to fight alongside local militias against Tacky and his slave rebels. Maroon contingents were commanded by the white superintendent of Moore Town, Charles Swigle, and the names of Maroon officers reporting to him were Clash and Sambo from Moore Town, Quaco and Cain from Charles Town, Jamaica, and Cudjo and Davy from Scott's Hall (Jamaica).

Upon defeating the revolt, Davy and a group of Maroons hunted down Tacky and his loyal lieutenants. Tacky and his men went running through the woods being chased by the Maroons and their legendary marksman, Davy. While running at full speed, Davy shot Tacky and cut off his head as evidence, for which he would be richly rewarded.

== Hunting runaway slaves ==
The treaties of 1739 and 1740 required the Maroons to hunt runaway slaves, for which they received rewards from the colonial authorities. After making his name killing Tacky, Davy found that many planters were willing to pay him to hunt down their runaway slaves. Davy then made a considerable living leading teams of Maroons in hunting runaways.

In 1774, while Davy was leading a group of Maroons hunting runaways near Hellshire Beach, one of his young followers, Samuel Grant, accidentally killed a white sea captain named Thompson. Later English writers claimed that Grant was the son of Davy.

== Death ==
While Davy lived, he was one of the Maroon officers who reported to the white superintendent in Scott's Hall. However, when he died, sometime in the eighteenth century, the superintendent no longer saw the need to appoint a Maroon officer to succeed him, and the Scott's Hall Maroons reported directly to the superintendent for the rest of the century.
