= Crawford's Town =

18th century Jamaican town

Crawford's Town was one of the two main towns belonging to the Windward Maroons, who fought a guerrilla war of resistance against the British colonial forces of Jamaica during the First Maroon War of the 1730s.

Crawford's Town was in the Spanish River area of the parish of St George, now the western half of Portland Parish, and was named after Edward Crawford, the Maroon leader of that town. Some historians believe that Crawford was a white officer. But Maroon historians have proved that Crawford was a Maroon.

== First Maroon War ==
There were two main leaders of the Windward Maroons towards the end of the First Maroon War. They were Quao, who led the Maroons of Crawford's Town, and Queen Nanny, who marshalled the Maroons of Nanny Town. Their towns provided a safe haven to runaway slaves, who escaped from the sugar and coffee plantations of coastal Jamaica, and found refuge in the forested interior of the Blue Mountains (Jamaica). Quao and Nanny successfully led a campaign of guerrilla warfare against the British colonial forces throughout the 1730s, and succeeding governors were unable to win any decisive victories against them.

When the British governor of Jamaica, Edward Trelawny, accepted that his armed forces would not be able to defeat the Jamaican Maroons of western (Leeward) Jamaica and eastern (Windward) Jamaica, he offered them treaties. In 1739, Trelawny offered a treaty to the Leeward Maroons, which was accepted and signed by their leader, Cudjoe. Once peace was agreed with the Leeward Maroons, Trelawny offered a treaty to the Windward Maroons in 1740, with support from Cudjoe and his forces. Quao signed the peace treaty, despite opposition from his ally, Nanny.

After the treaty of 1740, the colonial authorities of Jamaica referred to all the Windward Maroons as belonging to Crawford's Town. In terms of population, Crawford's Town was the second largest Maroon town, behind Cudjoe's Town (Trelawny Town) A colonial census taken of the Windward Maroons just after the treaty showed that they numbered about 300, and of that number, Crawford Town's population alone numbered 233.

== Crawford's Town Uprising ==
After the 1740 treaty, it appears that Quao and Nanny parted ways. It seems that Nanny took her supporters east to what would later become Moore Town on the eastern fringes of the Blue Mountains, while Quao took his people west to central Jamaica, and formed a community in a town that later came to be known as Crawford's Town on the western edge of the Blue Mountains. However, in about 1746, the white superintendents appointed by the British governors took control of Crawford's Town, and replaced Quao as the Maroon leader of that community. The new leader was another Maroon officer, Edward Crawford, after whom the town was eventually named.

In 1754, Quao and his supporters rose up in revolt, killed Ned Crawford, and captured the three white men who acted as superintendents in Crawford's Town. Governor Sir Charles Knowles, 1st Baronet sent a militia detachment under the command of Lieutenant Ross to negotiate with Quao, but the Maroon leader spurned his offers, and reasserted Maroon control of Crawford's Town. Ross then secured the allegiance of the supporters of Crawford, as well as other Windward Maroons, and they defeated the minority of Maroons who supported Quao, capturing him, and killing a number of his Maroon officers.

It is not clear what happened to Quao, because he disappears from the records after Crawford's Town was destroyed. The supporters of Quao relocated to the neighbouring Maroon town of Scott's Hall (Jamaica), while the supporters of Crawford took up residence in the new Maroon community of Charles Town (Jamaica). The white superintendents took control of both Charles Town and Scott's Hall in the aftermath of the Crawford's Town uprising.

== Government of Crawford's Town ==
=== Maroon leaders ===
c. 1740s Captain Quao

c. 1750s Captain Edward Crawford

=== White superintendents ===
c. 1745 George White

c. 1748 Francis Ross

c. 1752 William Trower

c. 1754 John Kelly, Richard Godfrey and William Kennedy
