= First Maroon War =

1728–1740 anti-British revolt in Jamaica

- Part of the Slave Revolts in North America
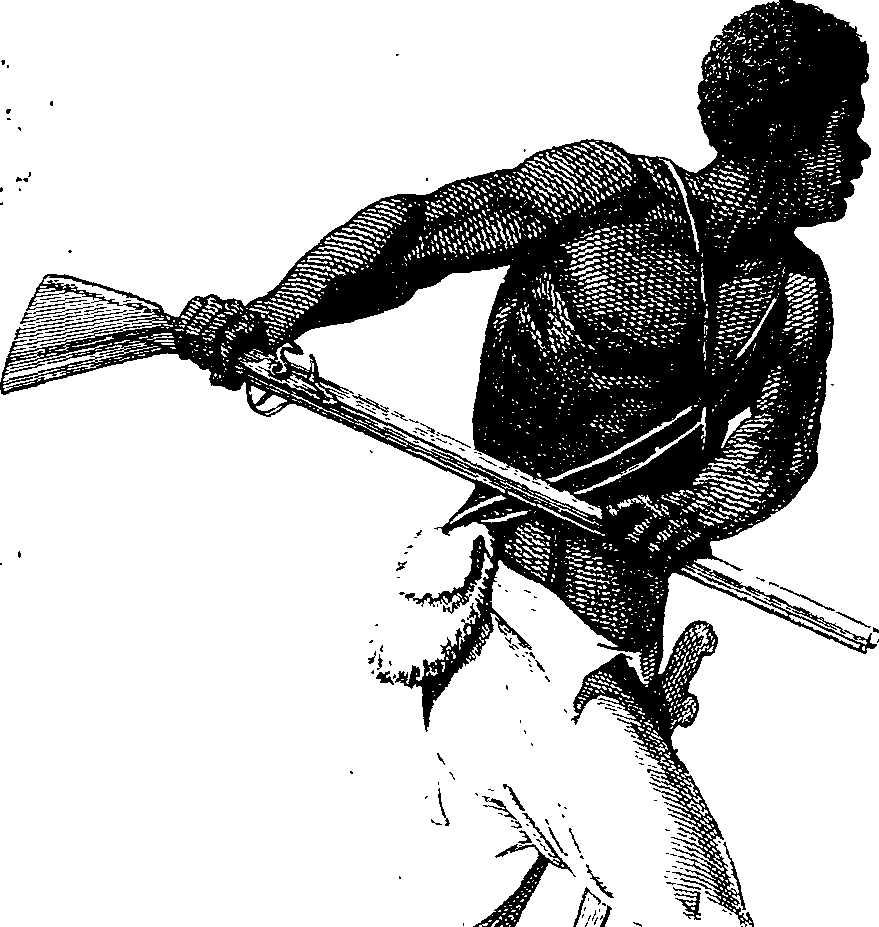
Date	1728 (Note: Some sources say 1725)–1739
Location	Jamaica
Result	British government offers peace treaties: Cudjoe agrees to stop attacks, not take part in new escapees and help capture escaping slaves; British give Leeward Maroons their freedom, own land, the right to hunt wild pigs and have their own government

Belligerents
(Kingdom of Great Britain) British Empire: (Kingdom of Great Britain) Colony of Jamaica	Windward Maroons; Leeward Maroons

Commanders and leaders
Governors of Jamaica: (Kingdom of Great Britain) Robert Hunter (Kingdom of Great Britain) John Ayscough (Kingdom of Great Britain) John Gregory (Kingdom of Great Britain) Edward Trelawny	Windward Maroons: Nanny of the Maroons; Quao; Leeward Maroons: Cudjoe; Accompong

Strength
A total of 10,000	A total of 1,000

The First Maroon War was a conflict between the Jamaican Maroons and the colonial British authorities that started around 1728 and continued until the peace treaties of 1739 and 1740. It was led by self-liberated Africans who set up communities in the mountains. The name "Maroon" was given to these Africans, and for many years they fought the British colonial Government of Jamaica for their freedom. The maroons were skilled in guerrilla warfare. The war was followed about half a century later by the Second Maroon War.

== Background ==
In 1655, the English defeated the Spanish colonists and took control of most of the Colony of Jamaica. After the Spanish fled, Africans that had previously been enslaved joined the Amerindian population, and some others who had previously escaped slavery, in the centre of Jamaica to form the Windward Maroon communities. The area is known as the Blue Mountains. The white population on the island of Jamaica boomed between 1655 and 1661, swelling to roughly 12,000 white inhabitants. In 1662, however, only a little over 3,000 remained.

The white-to-enslaved population ratio shifted in the following decades, leaving a majority of enslaved people and very few white settlers. British forces were unable to establish control over the whole island, so a large portion remained in the hands of the Maroons, particularly in the rugged interior. For 76 years, there were periodic skirmishes between the British and the Maroons, alongside occasional revolts from enslaved people. In 1673, a revolt of 200 enslaved Africans in St. Ann Parish created a separate group, the Leeward Maroons. According to one source, these Maroons united with a group of Malagasy people who had survived a shipwreck and formed their own maroon community in the parish of St. George in northeastern Jamaica. Several more rebellions strengthened the numbers of this Leeward group. Notably, in 1690 a revolt of 400 enslaved Africans at Sutton's plantation, in Clarendon Parish, Jamaica, considerably strengthened the Leeward Maroons.

The First Maroon War took place periodically between 1728 and 1740, and the Maroon leadership during this conflict featured Nanny of the Maroons, who was known for her expertise in guerrilla warfare, and Quao in the Windward Maroons, and Cudjoe and Accompong in the Leeward Maroons. A number of maroon captains fought under their leadership, such as Welcome and Jeddo for Nanny Town.

== Fighting ==
In September 1728, the British sent more troops to Jamaica, changing the balance of power with the Windward Maroons. That year, the British sent a new governor, Major-General Robert Hunter, to Jamaica, and under his rule the conflict with the Maroons escalated. One of the Maroon captains, a man called Jeddo, who according to Maroon historian Bev Carey is celebrated as a brave warrior by the Maroons of Moore Town, led an attack on the north east town of Port Antonio a year later, and when the British soldiers under Lieutenant Soaper tried to pursue them, the Maroons caught them off guard. Jeddo would have been a lieutenant of Nanny.

During the First Maroon War, the Maroons used guerrilla tactics to inflict greater losses on the colonial militias in terms of both manpower and expense. In 1730, Soaper led a large force against the Windward Maroons, but once again the Maroons, led by Nanny and Quao, defeated the militia. The next year, two additional regiments arrived in Jamaica to assist Hunter in fighting the Maroons.

In 1732, Hunter sent three parties against the Windward Maroons, and they occupied Nanny Town when the Maroons, led by Nanny, withdrew further into the Blue Mountains. The occupation of Nanny Town was expensive, and Hunter eventually recalled the militia, allowing the Maroons to retake their town without a fight. The next year, Hunter sent a party of British soldiers against the Windward Maroons, but the Maroons defeated them.

In 1734, the Windward Maroons fought the British in Portland Parish and St George. Enslaved Africans continued to free themselves and desert the Black Shot support forces in large numbers. Hunter died and was succeeded as governor by John Ayscough, but he also had limited success against the Maroons. That year, the militia recaptured Nanny Town.

In 1734, Nanny led the Maroons to victory against a party led by Captain Shettlewood. A group of the liberated Africans conquered an estate in St George, including a fort and the barracks there. The Windward Maroons removed westwards to the John Crow Mountains at a place called Cattawoods or Cattawood Springs, and continued their resistance to colonization. Colonial Jamaica was counting the cost of the continuing conflict. By the end of 1734, the island's white population had fallen to about 2,000. Sugar exports had fallen, and the island went through periods of martial law.

In 1735, over 100 Leeward Maroon warriors, led by Cudjoe, conquered a military barracks in western Jamaica. Ayscough died in office, and John Gregory became the new governor, and he immediately had to tackle the problem of Maroon attacks. In retaliation for the militia's occupation of Nanny Town, Windward Maroon warriors launched assaults on Titchfield Fort in Port Antonio.

In 1736, Maroons on both sides of the island launched a number of incursions into planter territory. In 1737, there were more Maroon attacks on estates in coastal areas. Gregory began to consider offering peace terms to the Maroons, because the British forces were unable to defeat them, while he authorised the construction of barracks at Manchioneal, Jamaica in Portland, Norman's Valley in Saint James Parish, Jamaica, and at Bagnell's Thicket. However, the building of barracks was expensive, and some planters refused to take part in funding it, claiming the Maroons never troubled them.

Eventually, the arrival of Edward Trelawny resulted in peace becoming a real possibility after a decade of fighting.

== Peace treaties ==
In 1739–40, the British government in Jamaica recognized that it could not defeat the Maroons, so Trelawny offered them peace treaties instead.

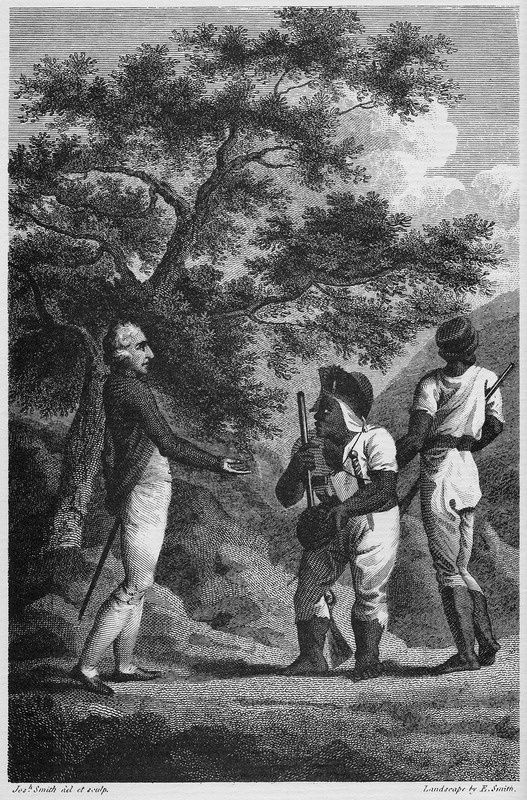
The maroon leader Cudjoe parleying with the planter John Guthrie

In 1739, the planter and colonial militia John Guthrie signed the first treaty with the Leeward Maroon leader, Cudjoe, who for years fought to maintain his people's independence. He felt that the only hope for the future was an honorable peace with the enemy. A year later, the Windward Maroons of Nanny Town, led by Queen Nanny and Quao, also agreed to sign a treaty under pressure from both white Jamaicans and the Leeward Maroons. The peace treaties forced the Maroons to support the institution of slavery.

The terms of the treaties largely reflected the power imbalance between the two sides, favoring British interests and granting the Maroons limited autonomy in exchange for their cooperation in maintaining the colonial system of slavery. The treaty terms were also different between the Maroon groups, with the Leeward Maroons receiving more favorable conditions, including a larger land grant and fewer restrictions on agricultural activities, while the Windward Treaty imposed stricter regulations and smaller land allocations.

== Legacy ==
The success of the Maroons in fighting the British to a standstill was felt far and wide, and half a century later, the creator of independent Haiti, Toussaint L'Ouverture, remarked that, "in Jamaica there are in the mountains Blacks who have forced the English to make treaties with them. Well, I am black like them. I know how to make war."

At first, the treaties only recognised Cudjoe's Town (Trelawny Town) and Crawford's Town. But after the destruction of Crawford's Town in the 1750s, the Maroons were located in five main towns: Accompong, Trelawny Town, Moore Town (formerly known as New Nanny Town), Scott's Hall (Jamaica) and Charles Town, Jamaica, living under their own rulers and a British supervisor known as a superintendent.

In exchange, they were asked to agree not to harbour newly self-liberated Africans ("runaways"), but rather to help catch them. This last clause in the treaty caused a split between the Maroons and the rest of the black population. Another provision of the agreement was that the Maroons would serve to protect the island from invaders.

Discontent with the treaty and land encroachment from planters later led to the Second Maroon War.

== Bibliography ==
- Carey, Bev (1997). The Maroon Story: The Authentic and Original History of the Maroons in the History of Jamaica 1490–1880. Kingston, Jamaica: Agouti Press.
- Patterson, Orlando (1973). "Slavery and Slave Revolts: A Sociohistorical Analysis of the First Maroon War, 1665–1740". In Price, Richard (ed.). Maroon Societies: Rebel Slave Communities in the Americas. Anchor Books. ISBN 0-385-06508-6.
- Campbell, Mavis C. (1990). The Maroons of Jamaica, 1655-1796. Trenton, N.J.: Africa World Press. ISBN 0-86543-096-9.

Among the early historians to mention the Jamaican Maroons and the First Maroon War were the following:

- Dallas, R. C. (1803). The History of the Maroons, From Their Origin to the Establishment of their Chief Tribe at Sierra Leone. London: Longman.
- Edwards, Bryan (1793). History, Civil and Commercial, of the British Colonies in the West Indies.
- Long, Edward (1774). The History of Jamaica.
