= Nanny Town =

- Abandoned Maroon Village
- Location within Jamaica
- Coordinates: 18.0683°N 76.5242°W
- Country: Jamaica
- Parish: Saint Thomas
- Founded: c1700
- Destroyed: 1734
- Founder: Nanny

Nanny Town was a village in the Blue Mountains of Portland Parish, northeastern Jamaica, used as a stronghold of Jamaican Maroons (escapee slaves). During the early 18th century, the region was led by an Ashanti escapee slave known as Queen Nanny, or Granny Nanny, who gave the town its name. The town was steadfast, and held-out against repeated attacks from the colonial militia before being abandoned in 1734.

== Origins ==
Nanny of the Maroons (also known as Queen Nanny and Granny Nanny) is supposed to have been born in what is now Ghana, West Africa, as a member of the Ashanti nation, part of the Akan people. Allegedly, she was enslaved along with her five "brothers-in-arms", and brought to eastern Jamaica. She and her five "brothers", Cudjoe, Accompong, Johnny, Cuffy and Quao, decided to flee the oppressive conditions of the sugar cane plantations to join the autonomous African communities of Maroons which had developed in the mountains.

These communities of Free black people in Jamaica originated from people formerly enslaved by the Spanish, who had refused to submit to British control. The Maroons of Nanny Town claim descent from escaped African slaves and Taíno men and women.

The Maroon communities grew as many more slaves escaped the plantations and joined them. Angered by continued raiding of plantations and armed confrontations, the colonial government mounted the First Maroon War of the 1730s in an effort to defeat and capture the runaway slaves.

One story is that Nanny and her "brothers" split up in order to continue the resistance to the plantation slave economy across Jamaica. Cudjoe went to Clarendon, where he was soon joined by about a hundred Maroons from Cottawood; while Accompong went to St. Elizabeth, where a Maroon community was later named for him. Nanny and Quao made their way to Portland and the Blue Mountains.

A more likely origin for the Leeward Maroons the Coromantee rebellion on Sutton's estate in western Jamaica in 1690. Most of these slaves escaped to form the Leeward Maroons. Cudjoe is probably the son of one of the leaders of this revolt. While Cudjoe emerged as the leader of the Leeward Maroons of the west, Nanny came to prominence as one of the main leaders of the Windward Maroons of the east.

== First Maroon War ==
By 1720, Nanny and Quao had organized and were leading the settlement of Windward Maroons; it was known as Nanny Town. Nanny Town was organized similarly to a typical Ashanti tribe in Africa. After the First Maroon War, a deed from the colonial government granted Nanny more than 500 acres (2.4 km^{2}) of land where the Maroons could live, raise animals and grow crops. The Maroons also sent traders to the coastal towns to exchange food for weapons and cloth. During the First Maroon War, the Maroons of Nanny Town raided plantations for weapons and food, burnt plantations, and led liberated slaves to join them at Nanny Town.

Nanny Town was an excellent location for a stronghold, as it overlooked Stony River via a 900-foot ridge, making a surprise attack by the British very difficult. The Maroons organized look-outs for such attacks, and warriors could be summoned by a horn called an abeng.

Granny Nanny allegedly freed more than 800 slaves over the span of 50 years. She also had a vast knowledge of herbs due to her role as a spiritual leader. During the First Maroon War, and especially between 1728 and 1734, the British attacked Nanny Town time and time again, but each time the colonial militias captured and occupied Nanny Town, the Windward Maroons regained it shortly afterwards. This was accomplished due to the skill of the Maroons in fighting in an area of high rainfall, as well as disguising themselves as bushes and trees. The Maroons also used decoys to trick the British into a surprise attack. Non-camouflaged Maroons would run out into view of the British and then run in the direction of the fellow Maroons who were disguised, leading the British into ambushes time and time again.

After another Windward Maroon leader, Quao, signed the treaty of 1740 with the British, the Windward Maroons split up. Quao's supporters moved to what later became known as Crawford's Town, while the Maroons of Nanny Town relocated to Moore Town.

== Leaders of Nanny Town ==
1720s – 1750s Queen Nanny

1720s – 1750s Captain Welcome
