= Quao =

- Died: c. 1750s
- Known for: Leader in Jamaican uprisings against British colonial forces

Quao (d. c. 1750s) was one of the leaders of the Windward Maroons of Jamaica, who fought the British colonial forces of Jamaica to a standstill during the First Maroon War of the 1730s. The name Quao is probably a variation of Yaw, which is the Twi Akan name given to a boy born on a Thursday.

== First Maroon War ==
The Windward Maroons were based in the forested interior of the island, in the heart of the Blue Mountains (Jamaica). During the First Maroon War, Quao shared the leadership of the Windward Maroons with Queen Nanny, an outstanding female Maroon leader. Under the leadership of Quao and Nanny, the Windward Maroons carried out the bulk of the fighting against the British colonial authorities during the 1730s.

When Governor Edward Trelawny realized that the British colonial forces would not be able to win the First Maroon War, he offered a treaty first to Cudjoe of the Leeward Maroons in 1739, and then to Quao in 1740. However, Cudjoe was able to secure a more advantageous treaty than Quao, probably because the western Maroon leader was negotiating from a stronger position. The 1739 treaty gave Cudjoe permission to keep all Maroons who had joined his town before he signed the document, but the Windward Maroons were required to return all runaways who joined them in the three years prior to Quao signing the 1740 treaty.

Quao watched while the British military commanders quarreled over who should sign the treaty with the Windward Maroons, an argument that was eventually won by Robert Bennett. Quao and Bennett ‘cut their fingers, and mixed their blood in a calabash bowl’, after which they signed the peace treaty.

== Crawford's Town uprising ==
After the 1740 treaty, it appears that Quao and Nanny parted ways. It seems that Nanny took her supporters east to what would later become Moore Town on the eastern fringes of the Blue Mountains, while Quao took his people west to central Jamaica, and formed a community in a town that later came to be known as Crawford's Town on the western edge of the Blue Mountains. However, in about 1746, the white superintendents appointed by the British governors took control of Crawford's Town, and replaced Quao as the Maroon leader of that community. The new leader was another Maroon officer, Edward Crawford, after whom the town was eventually named.

In 1754, Quao and his supporters rose up in revolt, killed Ned Crawford, and captured the three white men who acted as superintendents in Crawford's Town. Governor Charles Knowles sent a militia detachment under the command of Lieutenant Ross to negotiate with Quao, but the Maroon leader spurned his offers, and reasserted Maroon control of Crawford's Town. Ross then secured the allegiance of the supporters of Crawford, as well as other Windward Maroons, and they defeated the minority of Maroons who supported Quao, capturing him, and killing a number of his Maroon officers.

== Legacy ==
It is not clear what happened to Quao, because he disappears from the records after Crawford's Town was destroyed. The supporters of Quao relocated to the neighbouring Maroon town of Scott's Hall (Jamaica), while the supporters of Crawford took up residence in the new Maroon community of Charles Town (Jamaica). The white superintendents took control of both Charles Town and Scott's Hall in the aftermath of the Crawford's Town uprising. Maroon officers, such as Davy the Maroon, reported to the superintendents in Scott's Hall.
