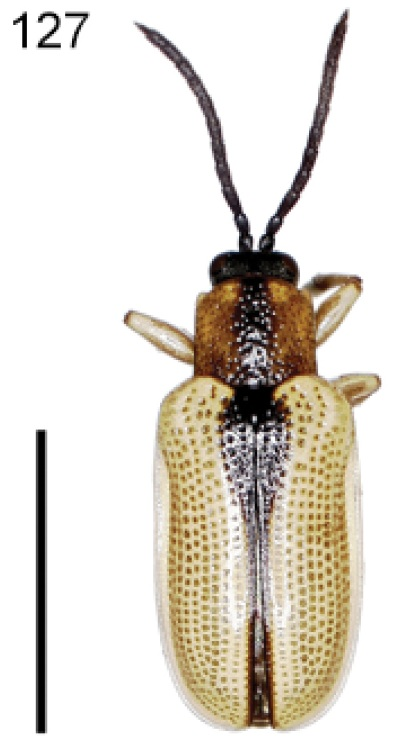

Scientific classification
- Kingdom: Animalia
- Phylum: Arthropoda
- Class: Insecta
- Order: Coleoptera
- Suborder: Polyphaga
- Infraorder: Cucujiformia
- Family: Chrysomelidae
- Genus: Cephaloleia
- Species: C. dorsalis

Binomial name
- Cephaloleia dorsalis Baly, 1885

= Cephaloleia dorsalis =

Species of beetle

Cephaloleia dorsalis is a species of beetle of the family Chrysomelidae. It is found in Costa Rica, Guatemala and Panama.

== Description ==
Adults reach a length of about 4.4–5.4 mm. The head, antennae and pronotum are black, while the elytron is yellow with a black sutural vitta.

== Biology ==
Adults have been collected on Costus and Renealmia species, Cephaloleia pulverulentus, Cephaloleia bracteatus, Cephaloleia laevis, Cephaloleia malortieanus and Cheilocostus speciosus.
