= Cotterwood =

Town in Jamaica

Coordinates: 18°05′N 77°54′W

Cotterwood is a town in Saint Elizabeth Parish, Jamaica. It is at latitude 18° 4' 60" N, Longitude 77° 54' 0" W and at an altitude of 107 metres.

The community here was founded by Jamaican Maroons who originally came from Cattawood Springs in Portland Parish. The community has retained much of African culture in consequence., with the names Yulie and Oli being used often. The local dialect includes several African words such as bafan which refers to someone who is clumsy, bubu, for someone who behaves stupid, buffa-buffa meaning fat, chacka-chaka for someone who is untidy and fenke fenke for feeble. The name of Cotterwood (like Cattawood) probably derives from the Twi word katá which means to cover conceal or protect.

Leonard Barrett, the author of several books including The Sun and The Drum comes from Cotterwood and has researched the African roots in Jamaican Folk Tradition.
