= Scott's Hall, Jamaica =

Scott's Hall is one of the four official towns of the Jamaican Maroons. It is located in Saint Mary Parish, Jamaica.

Scott's Hall is one of the towns belonging to the Windward Maroons, which are situated along the Blue Mountains (Jamaica). While Moore Town is in the easternmost part of the mountain range, Charles Town, Jamaica is more centrally located. However, while Moore Town and Charles Town are situated in Portland Parish, Scott's Hall is on the westernmost edge of the range in St Mary. The only Leeward Maroon town in Jamaica is Accompong Town, located in the western Cockpit Country. However, the Returned Maroons of Cudjoe's Town (Trelawny Town) now live just outside Maroon Town, Jamaica.

== History ==
Originally, the largest Windward Maroon town was Crawford's Town, located high in the Blue Mountains. However, a leadership conflict between Quao and Edward Crawford in 1754 resulted in the destruction of Crawford's Town. Scott's Hall was established by supporters of Quao in 1749, and when a conflict five years later resulted in the destruction of Crawford's Town, more supporters of Quao were relocated to Scott's Hall.

However, upon the establishment of Scott's Hall, white superintendents assumed control of the Maroon town, and the Maroon officers reported to them. In 1760, while Cudjo and Davy the Maroon were the nominal Maroon leaders of Scott's Hall, they reported to the Moore Town superintendent, who marshalled the Maroon forces during Tacky's War. Davy, a legendary marksman, is credited with personally killing Tacky, and bringing an end to the main part of the revolt. By the time Cudjo and Davy died, sometime before the mid-1790s, the superintendent did not see the need to appoint another Maroon officer, and instead ruled the smallest Maroon town directly.

In 1770, there were 42 Maroons living in Scott's Hall, and by 1797 the village's population had only increased marginally to 45. In 1808, the Maroon population of Scott's Hall was just 51, but by 1841 it had more than doubled to 105.

In 1781, the superintendent of Scott's Hall, Bernard Nalty, led a party of Windward Maroons that killed Three Fingered Jack (Jamaica), a notorious leader of a group of runaway slaves.

Because only a few Scott's Hall Maroons owned slaves, they did not follow the other two Windward Maroon towns in embracing the Anglican Church version of Christianity. Instead, the Maroons of Scott's Hall welcome Baptist missionaries into their village. Like Charles Town, a large number of residents in Scott's Hall were non-Maroons.

== Government ==
=== Maroon officers ===
c. 1760 - c. 1793 Captain Cudjo and Captain Davy the Maroon

c. 1790s Colonel George Gray

c. 1807 - c. 1809 Captain John Gordon (d. c. 1809)

c. 1809 Captain Peter Ellis

2016 – Present Colonel Rudolph Pink

2023 - Present Colonel Loyld Lattibeaudiere

In 2016, Rudolph Pink was elected Maroon colonel of Scott's Hall.

A dispute over the leadership of Scott's Hall resulted in the arrest of Pink for breaches of a coronavirus curfew, and allegations of an attempted coup by Lloyd Lattibeaudiere. There is a rival claimant to the post of chief of Scott's Hall, named Rastalogy Francis.

A maroon receivership internal government investigation (MRIGI) concluded by reinstating Pink as the Maroon chief of Scott's Hall.

On January 9, 2020, Pink asked the Jamaican government to ratify or sign a document, called the “free paper”, by maroons.

=== White superintendents ===
c. 1760s Edward Cresswell, Benjamin Brown and John George

c. 1773 William Trower

c. 1776 - c. 1782 Bernard Nalty

c. 1782 - c. 1785 Daniel Fisher

1785 - c. 1787 William Virgo Brodbelt

1787 - 1792/4 John Spence Brodbelt

1792/4 - c. 1796 Edmund Pusey March

c. 1796 - c. 1797 John March

1797 - 1831 Thomas March (d. 1831)

1831 - ? Philip Thomas Livingston

== 21st century ==
Once a year, Scott's Hall promotes a traditional Maroon festival named Kyushu (water fest). This traditional festivity speaks to ceremonial ancestors and the signing of the treaty.

Scott's Hall has a population of over 3,000, and is a traditional farming community. Its natural resources include sustainable resources such as bamboo. Scott's Hall boasts a museum, and a head office for the new Maroon paramount chief is currently under consultation.
