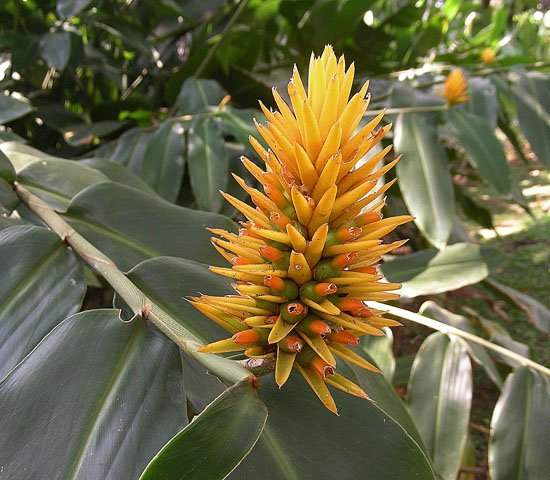

Scientific classification
- Kingdom: Plantae
- Clade: Tracheophytes
- Clade: Angiosperms
- Clade: Monocots
- Clade: Commelinids
- Order: Zingiberales
- Family: Zingiberaceae
- Genus: Renealmia
- Species: R. cernua

Binomial name
- Renealmia cernua (Sw. ex Roem. & Schult.) J.F.Macbr.

Synonyms
- Costus cernuus Sw. ex Roem. & Schult.

= Renealmia cernua =

Species of flowering plant

Renealmia cernua is a species of plant in the family Zingiberaceae. It was first described in 1931 by James Francis Macbride. The native range of Renealmia cernua is Southeastern Mexico to Southern Tropical America.

Renealmia cernua typically makes juvenile inflorescences in the beginning of the dry season, and flowers from the late dry season through the rainy season. Fruits mature in the middle to late rainy season.

Like other species of Renealmia, (R.alpinia, R.aromatica, and R.nicolaioides), it is used for treating snakebite in Colombia.
