= Podocarpus urbanii =

Conservation status
- Critically Endangered (IUCN 3.1)

Scientific classification
- Kingdom: Plantae
- Clade: Tracheophytes
- Clade: Gymnosperms
- Division: Pinophyta
- Class: Pinopsida
- Order: Araucariales
- Family: Podocarpaceae
- Genus: Podocarpus
- Species: P. urbanii

Binomial name
- Podocarpus urbanii Pilg.

Species of conifer

Podocarpus urbanii is a species of conifer in the family Podocarpaceae. It is a tree endemic to eastern Jamaica. It is native to the Blue Mountains and John Crow Mountains, where it grows in high montane cloud forests from 915 to 2,265 metres elevation. Other dominant canopy trees in these forests include Clethra occidentalis, Cyrilla racemiflora, Alchornea latifolia, and the introduced invasive tree Pittosporum undulatum.
