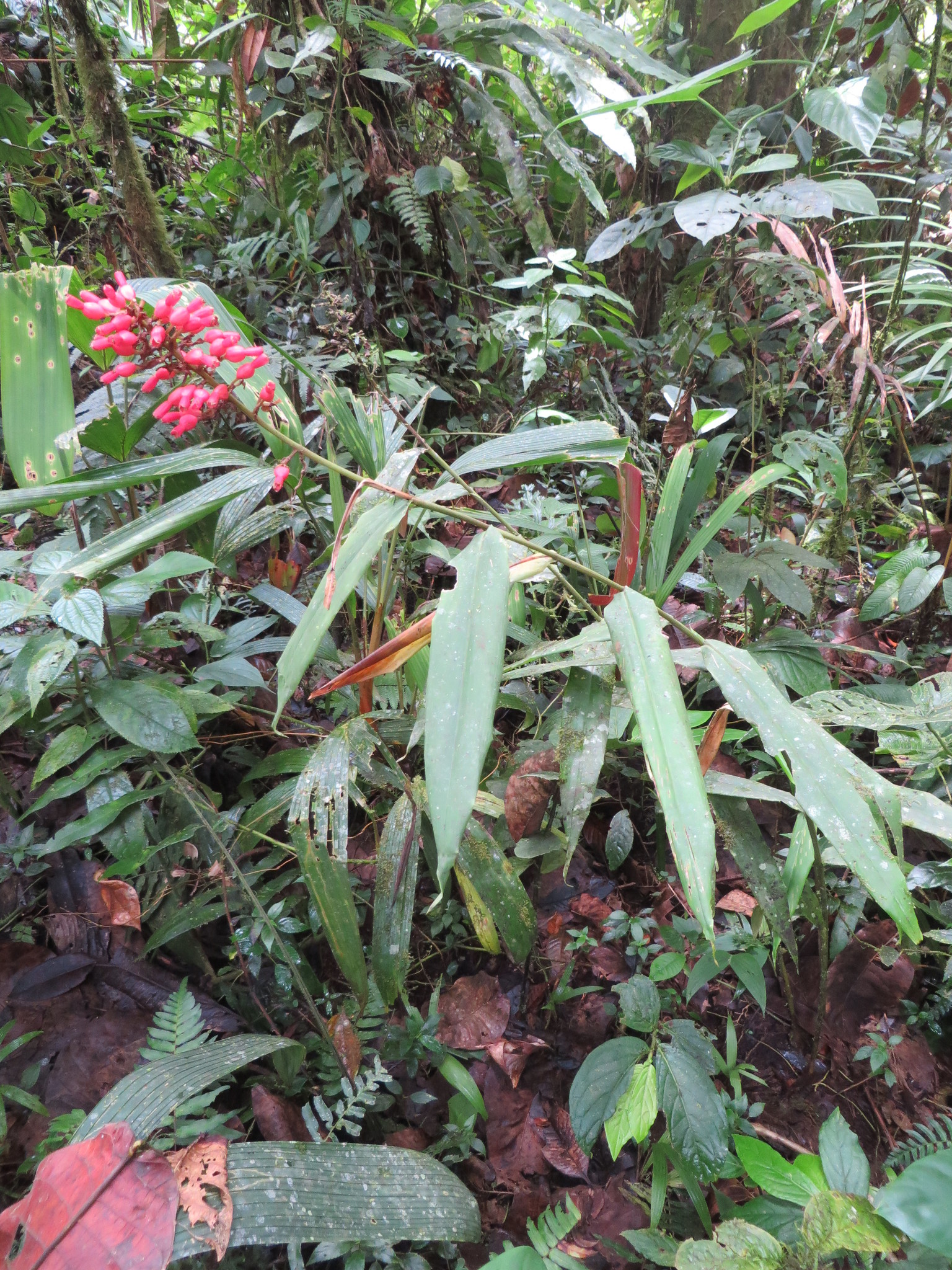

Conservation status
- Near Threatened (IUCN 3.1)

Scientific classification
- Kingdom: Plantae
- Clade: Tracheophytes
- Clade: Angiosperms
- Clade: Monocots
- Clade: Commelinids
- Order: Zingiberales
- Family: Zingiberaceae
- Genus: Renealmia
- Species: R. sessilifolia

Binomial name
- Renealmia sessilifolia Gagnep.

Synonyms
- Renealmia porphyrobractea K.Schum.

= Renealmia sessilifolia =

Species of flowering plant

Renealmia sessilifolia is a species of flowering plant in the family Zingiberaceae. It is endemic to Ecuador. Its natural habitat is subtropical or tropical moist montane forests.
