= Maroon Town, Jamaica =

Settlement in Jamaica

Coordinates: 18.330°N 77.818°W

Location of Maroon Town in Jamaica

Maroon Town is a settlement in Jamaica. It has a population of 3,122 as of 2009.

== Geography and economy ==
Maroon Town is located in the conical Cockpit Country that spans parts of the parishes of St. James, St. Elizabeth and Trelawny. Located in Saint James Parish, Jamaica the community sits approximately 29 kilometers, southwest of Montego Bay, the parish capital.

This former settlement of the Jamaican Maroons has a variety of Jamaican flora and fauna. Farmers in this area invest in ground provisions (including yam) and other staples, but especially bananas. Bananas have over the years been commercially successful as a profit-making venture in this community and are also a regular staple of locals.

The Maroon Pride Banana Chips brand originated in this community.

== Cudjoe's Town and Trelawny Town ==
It is a former home of runaway slaves who became Jamaican Maroons and fought two guerrilla wars against the colonial authorities, the First Maroon War of the 1730s and the Second Maroon War of 1795–6. When it was a home to these escaped slaves, it was called Cudjoe's Town (Trelawny Town). Once the governor, Edward Trelawny, authorised the signing of a treaty with Cudjoe in 1739, Cudjoe's Town became known as Trelawny Town.

After the Second Maroon War, the colonial authorities deported the Maroons of Trelawny Town to Nova Scotia and then Sierra Leone. They then renamed the settlement Maroon Town, and since then it has been a place of archaeological research.

== Military barracks ==
Maroon Town was used as a military barracks for half a century after the Trelawny Maroons were deported, but the colonial government found it difficult to maintain an outpost there. In 1812, a hurricane destroyed most of the buildings in the barracks.

Since then, over the years, many officers complained about the poor state of the barracks and the hospital, as well as the frequent rainfall and dampness. The barracks became difficult to maintain, and the colonial authorities eventually abandoned the barracks in the 1850s.

== Returned Maroons of Flagstaff ==
When scores of Trelawny Maroons returned to Jamaica following the abolition of slavery in the 1830s, many of them settled in the nearby village of Flagstaff.

In 1905, visitors to Maroon Town observed some Returned Maroons from nearby Flagstaff hunting wild hogs.
