= Renealmia dolichocalyx =

Conservation status
- Near Threatened (IUCN 3.1)

Scientific classification
- Kingdom: Plantae
- Clade: Tracheophytes
- Clade: Angiosperms
- Clade: Monocots
- Clade: Commelinids
- Order: Zingiberales
- Family: Zingiberaceae
- Genus: Renealmia
- Species: R. dolichocalyx

Binomial name
- Renealmia dolichocalyx Maas

Species of flowering plant

Renealmia dolichocalyx is a species of plant in the family Zingiberaceae. It is endemic to Ecuador. Its natural habitat is subtropical or tropical moist montane forests.
