= Renealmia jamaicensis =

Scientific classification
- Kingdom: Plantae
- Clade: Tracheophytes
- Clade: Angiosperms
- Clade: Monocots
- Clade: Commelinids
- Order: Zingiberales
- Family: Zingiberaceae
- Genus: Renealmia
- Species: R. jamaicensis

Binomial name
- Renealmia jamaicensis (Gaertn.) Horan.

Synonyms
- Alpinia jamaicensis Gaertn.; Ethanium racemosum Salisb.; Zingiber uncinatum Stokes

Species of flowering plant

Renealmia jamaicensis is a species of plant in the family Zingiberaceae. It is native to the Caribbean, more specifically Bahamas, Cuba, Dominican Republic, Haiti, Jamaica, and Puerto Rico. It was first described by Joseph Gaertner and given its current name by Paul Fedorowitsch Horaninow.

Renealmia jamaicensis is known as Cojatillo (Cuba), Cumaní (Dominican Republic), Gingembre marron (Haiti), Jengibre amarillo (Dominican Republic), Jengibre cimarrón (Dominican Republic), and Narciso colorado (Puerto Rico).

Two varieties are recognized: Renealmia jamaicensis var. jamaicensis and Renealmia jamaicensis var. puberula.
