= Moore Town, Jamaica =

Jamaican Maroon settlement

Coordinates: 18.075°N 76.425°W

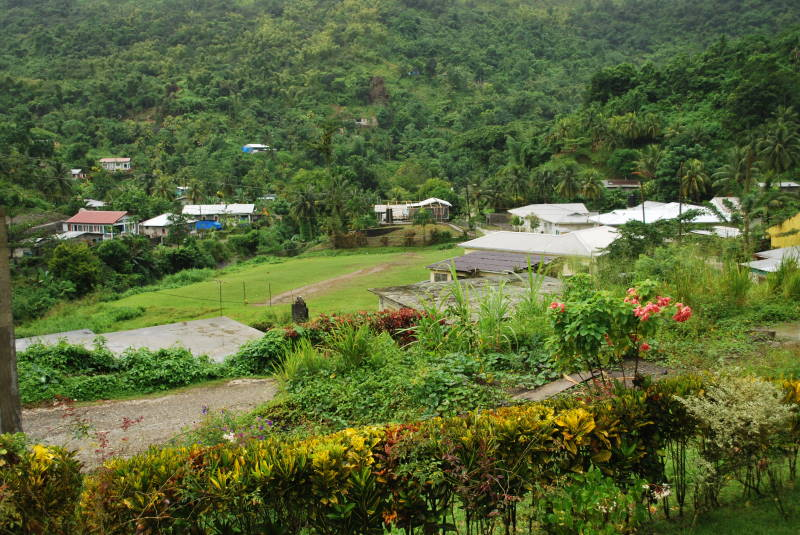
Image of JM Moore Town

Moore Town is a Maroon settlement located in the Blue Mountains and John Crow Mountains of Portland, Jamaica, accessible by road from Port Antonio. The easternmost Maroon town, Moore Town is located in the eastern end of the parish. Formerly known as New Nanny Town, Moore Town was founded in 1740 when the Peace Treaty was signed between the British colonial authorities and the Windward Maroons. This treaty allotted the Moore Town Maroons 1000 acres, but Moore Town only received 500. In 1781 the initial 500 acres was augmented with another 500 acres, taking their communal land up to 1,000 acres.

While Maroons and the British initially referred to this settlement as New Nanny Town, from 1760 the colonial authorities called it Moore Town or Muretown, when it was reportedly named after acting governor Sir Henry Moore.

As of 2009 Moore Town has a reported population of 1,106.

== Nanny Town ==
The conquest of Jamaica by the English in 1655 led to an influx of Western and Central Africans into the country through the slave trade. Consequently, a number of the enslaved escaped to various parts of the mountains, joining another group that had been released by the Spanish during the Invasion of Jamaica. These Free black people in Jamaica, who inhabited Moore Town, claim descent from escaped Africans and Taíno men and women.

These people became known as the Jamaican Maroons. This migration disrupted the slave plantation, resulting in periodic war between the Maroons and British. After approximately 80 years of warfare, the Maroons controlled a sizeable amount of the mountainous forests of the eastern parts of Jamaica. Eventually, the British recognized their autonomy by offering them peace treaties which brought an end to the First Maroon War.

In 1739, Cudjoe, the leader of the Leeward Maroons in western Jamaica, signed a peace treaty that recognized the independence of Cudjoe's Town (Trelawny Town) and Accompong. This treaty allowed them numerous benefits, including tax-free lands throughout the island. These lands are still home to succeeding generations of the original Maroons in western Jamaica.

The community of Moore Town was founded by one of the Maroon leaders, "sister" to Cudjoe, Nanny, and during the First Maroon War they lived in Nanny Town. Nanny refused to sign the Peace Treaty of 1740 between the British colonial government and the Windward Maroons, but acquiesced in the uneasy truce that followed. Nanny accepted a land patent which gave her people 500 acres of land, at a site which late became known as Moore Town.

== Moore Town ==
After the signing of the treaty the people under Nanny's jurisdiction split into two groups, with one half migrating with her "brother" Quao to Crawford's Town and the other half relocating to New Nanny Town, which is now known as Moore Town.

When the colonial authorities identified New Nanny Town in 1760, they referred to it as Moore Town. The governor of the Colony of Jamaica at the time was Sir Henry Moore, 1st Baronet, and it is possible the town was renamed in his honour.

By 1760 however, the successors of Nanny had lost control of Moore Town to the white superintendents, and in that year these superintendents commanded Maroon warriors in the fighting against Tacky's revolt. In the decade that followed, a Maroon officer named Clash attempted to challenge the authority of the superintendent, but he was unsuccessful because he did not have the support of his fellow Maroons.

In 1774, a Maroon officer from Charles Town (Jamaica) named Samuel Grant allegedly killed a white sea captain named Townshend and his black slave while hunting runaways in Hellshire Beach, and then fled to Moore Town for refuge. Admiral George Rodney, who was in Kingston, Jamaica at the time, sent a fleet to Port Antonio in anticipation of a Maroon revolt. The white superintendent persuaded the Moore Town Maroons to hand over Grant, who stood trial at Spanish Town. However, much to the surprise of local planters, Grant was acquitted of the murder of Townshend.

In 1770, there were 136 Maroons at Moore Town, but by 1797 that number had grown to 245.

Moore Town remained neutral during the Second Maroon War of 1795–6.

In 1808, the population of Moore Town was 310, but it more than doubled to 665 in 1841.

The Maroons of Moore Town, under the leadership of Charles Town superintendent Alexander Fyfe (Fyffe), helped to put down the Christmas Rebellion of 1831–2, also known as the Baptist War, led by Samuel Sharpe.

In 1865, poor free blacks, led by Paul Bogle, rose in revolt against the colonial authorities in the Morant Bay Rebellion. The governor called out the Moore Town Maroons one last time to put down the rebellion. Fyfe was called up once more to lead a combination of Moore Town Maroons, including some who resided in Hayfield and Bath, and they committed a number of atrocities before they captured Bogle. However, their cruelty in suppressing the uprising attracted a lot of criticism from Methodist missionaries and residents of Saint Thomas Parish, Jamaica.

== Government ==
=== Maroon officers ===
c. 1760s Captain Clash

c. 1760s Captain Sambo

1790s - ? Colonel Charles Harris

=== White superintendents ===
c. 1758 - c. 1782 Charles Swigle

1782 - 1804 Charles Douglas

1804- 1824 George Fuller (d. c. 1824)

1824 - 1827 John Anderson Orgill

1827 - 1830 George Minot (d. c. 1830)

c. 1830s Thomas Wright

Following the British recognition of Maroon settlements, British superintendents were assigned as diplomats to settlements to maintain good relations between the Maroons and the British. However, in the mid-18th century, these superintendents gradually usurped the authority of the Maroon officers. The most notable Superintendent for Moore Town was Lt. George Fuller, who held this position in the early 19th century. The British colonial authorities abolished the role of the superintendent in the 1850s.

== 20th century ==
Since Jamaica's independence from the British in 1962, the Government of Jamaica has recognized the sovereignty of the Maroons. Their recognition aligns with the terms of the UN Declaration on the Rights of Indigenous Peoples (2007) of particular note the "right for self-government in matters relating to local affairs".

Moore Town's head of state is given the title of colonel, which alternatively is referred to as a chief. The system of election is unique in that no individual acting in the capacity of colonel has pursued the position; instead, they are approached with the opportunity and elected through acclamation. The community is governed by a colonel who is assisted by a Maroon Council that consists of 24 members.

After the discontinuation of the superintendents, Maroon officers reasserted their authority over the Maroon towns. Ernest Downer served as colonel from 1952 to 1964, and C.L.G. Harris from 1964 to 1995.

In 1995, Wallace Sterling was elected as Colonel of Moore Town, and currently serves as Colonel.

== Language and religion ==
Moore Town converted to Christianity in the nineteenth century, eventually embracing the Anglican Church. It is believed that Moore Town embraced the Church of England because that Protestant sect endorsed slave-ownership, and the Moore Town Maroons owned slaves. However, by the 1850s, the traditions of Revival and Pentecostalism grew out of the merging of West African religions with Christianity.

The Maroons of Moore Town have maintained a dialectal variant of the Asante language. The Moore town variant is known as Kromanti. The name Kromanti is derived from Coromantyn, at the time a Fante slaving sea port located on the Gold Coast of what is now known as Ghana. The Fantes kidnapped their rivals the Asante in the night time during the 1720s according to Edward Long. Before that, the Asantes were a tributary state to Denkyira and Denkyira sold many Asantes to the coastal Fantes who were very close to the British. So close, they are the only Ghanaians today with English names. Prior to the 20th century Kromanti was spoken conversationally in Moore Town but since the 1930s its fluency has dwindled among the younger members of the community. It is now reserved for ceremonial and religious purposes. In conjunction with Kromanti, Jamaican Maroon Creole makes up what is considered Maroon Spirit Language, or MSL.

The Kromanti Play is a ceremonial event that employs the use of Kromanti to communicate with ancestral spirits. It is one of the few linguistic features that uniquely separates the Moore Town Maroons from the other Windward bands. Due to its diminished fluency and the accompanying threat of cultural heritage being lost, Kromanti has been recognized in 2003 by UNESCO as one of the Masterpieces of the Oral and Intangible Heritage of Humanity.

== Music ==
Maroon Music is an important aspect of the Maroon culture and each of the Maroon Towns have their own distinct music genres, styles and instruments used in performance. The Moore Town Maroons use several types of drums, along with drumming styles, to accompany their music making. Moore Town is the only community of Maroons who also utilizes drums in "speech mode" to perform Drum-Language. Drum-Language is used to communicate with the spirits of their ancestors, as well as call ceremonies to order. Of the varying drums there is the Aprinting, a duo of long cylindrical drums. There is also a supporting drum known as the "Rolling Drum", and a lead drum known as the "Cutting Drum". The drums are not played by just any musician, and those who play them are given special titles that reflect their ability to do so.

Accompanying the drums are other instruments, such as Iron, Abaso Tik, and Kwat.

Across all the Maroon Communities, musicians use an instrument known as the Abeng, a wind instrument fashioned from the horn of a cow. The Abeng can produce two pitches, and is used to perform "Abeng-Language". Abeng-Language played a major role in communication during the first and second Maroon War, as its high pitch allowed it to convey complex messages across far distances.
