= Charles Town, Jamaica =

Town in Jamaica

Coordinates: 18°12′44″N 76°40′17″W

Charles Town is one of four official towns of the Jamaican Maroons. It is located on Buff Bay River in Portland Parish.

Charles Town is one of the towns belonging to the (eastern) Windward Maroons, the others being Moore Town and Scott's Hall. The only official town of the (western) Leeward Maroons is Accompong Town. However, the Returned Maroons of Cudjoe's Town (Trelawny Town) now live just outside Maroon Town.

== Destruction of Crawford's Town ==
Originally, the largest Windward Maroon town was Crawford's Town, located high in the Blue Mountains. However, a leadership conflict between Quao and Edward Crawford in 1754 resulted in the destruction of Crawford's Town.

Following the destruction of Crawford's Town, the governor, Sir Charles Knowles, 1st Baronet, relocated the supporters of Ned Crawford to a new village, just three miles north of Crawford's Town, while the supporters of Quao moved to Scott's Hall. It was originally known as New Crawford Town, and some colonial records as late as 1760 referred to Charles Town as Crawford's Town. The supporters of Crawford reportedly renamed it Charles Town after Knowles in an expression of gratitude for his support during the 1754 uprising.

== Charles Town in the 18th century ==
However, upon the establishment of Charles Town, white superintendents assumed control of the Maroon town, and the Maroon officers reported to them. In 1760, while Quaco and Cain were the nominal Maroon leaders of Charles Town, they reported to the Moore Town superintendent, who marshalled the Maroon forces during Tacky's War.

In 1774, a Maroon officer from Charles Town named Samuel Grant allegedly killed a white sea captain named Townshend and his black slave while hunting runaways in Hellshire, but at his trial at then capital Spanish Town, much to the surprise of local planters, Grant was acquitted of the murder of Townshend. Grant returned to Charles Town, where he rose through the ranks of the Maroon officer class, eventually becoming a major and nominally leader of the Maroon town, a post he held for many years. In 1781, Charles Town Maroons Grant, William Carmichael Cockburn (Little Quaco) and John Reeder were a part of the Maroon party that successfully hunted and killed the notorious leader of a community of runaway slaves, Three Fingered Jack.

In 1770, there were 226 Maroons at Charles Town, but by 1797 that number had grown to 289. During the Second Maroon War of 1795–6, the Windward Maroons remained neutral, but the governor, Alexander Lindsay, 6th Earl of Balcarres, ordered Grant to lead a party of Charles Town Maroons to Kingston to await his orders. However, an obeah man advised Grant that Balcarres planned to deport them, and Grant, suspicious of the governor, led his men back to their Maroon town in the Blue Mountains. Balcarres later admitted that he had indeed planned to deport the Windward Maroons.

== Charles Town in the 19th century ==
In 1807, the colonial authorities exposed a slave conspiracy, and one of the informers claimed that the Charles Town Maroons under Major Robert Bentham were conspirators. Grant, who was the elderly leader of Charles Town, denied the charges. William Anderson Orgill, the magistrate who investigated the case, dismissed the evidence of the slave conspirators, and chose to believe Grant's expressions of loyalty.

Under the leadership of Charles Town superintendent Alexander Fyfe (Fyffe), the Maroons helped to put down the Christmas Rebellion of 1831–2, also known as the Baptist War, led by Samuel Sharpe.

In 1808, the Maroon population of Charles Town was 254, and it grew slowly to 391 in 1831, after which it decreased to 357 in 1841.

Charles Town converted to Christianity in the nineteenth century, eventually embracing the Anglican Church. It is believed that Charles Town embraced the Church of England because that Protestant sect endorsed slave-ownership, and the Charles Town Maroons owned slaves. However, by the 1850s, the traditions of Revival and Pentecostalism grew out of the merging of West African religions with Christianity.

== Government ==
=== Maroon officers ===
c. 1760s Captain Quaco and Captain Cain

c. 1776 Colonel George Gray

c. 1796 Lieutenant-colonel Afee Cudjoe

c. 1796 – c. 1808 Colonel Samuel Grant (d. 1808)

c. 1807 Lieutenant-colonel James Giscomb and Major Robert Bentham

=== White superintendents ===
c. 1759 Patrick Fleming

c. 1763 – c. 1769 Francis Ross

c. 1773 – c. 1792 Peter Ingram

1792 – 1795 John Ingram

1795 – 1801 James Anderson (d. 1801)

1804 – 1806 Philip Ellis

1806 – 1808/9 Peter Grant

1808/9 – 1811/12 William Dove

1811/12 – 1816 Edward Pinnock Wallen

1816 – 1827 Robert Gray

1827 – 1829 Alexander Gordon Fyffe

1829 – 1831 Leonard Baugh

1831 – 1833 Alexander Gordon Fyffe

1833 – ? Robert Baugh

1839 John Neilson

Following the British recognition of Maroon settlements, British Superintendents were assigned as diplomats to settlements to maintain good relations between the Maroons and British. However, in the mid-18th century, these superintendents gradually usurped the authority of the Maroon officers. The British colonial authorities abolished the role of the superintendent in the 1850s.

== Charles Town in the 21st century ==
The main attractions in the community are the museum, the library and the Asafu Ground. In front of the museum is a library on Maroon heritage, while the Asafu Ground is the venue of the annual Charles Town Maroon celebrations. Unlike Moore Town and Accompong Town, a significant percentage of the population of Charles Town is made up of non-Maroons.

As of 2018, the population of Charles Town was just over 2,500.

The current Maroon acting colonel of Charles Town is Marcia Douglas.

The Charles Town Maroon Museum was opened in 2003 by its founders Colonel Frank Lumsden and Kenneth Douglas, the father of current acting colonel, Marcia Douglas.
