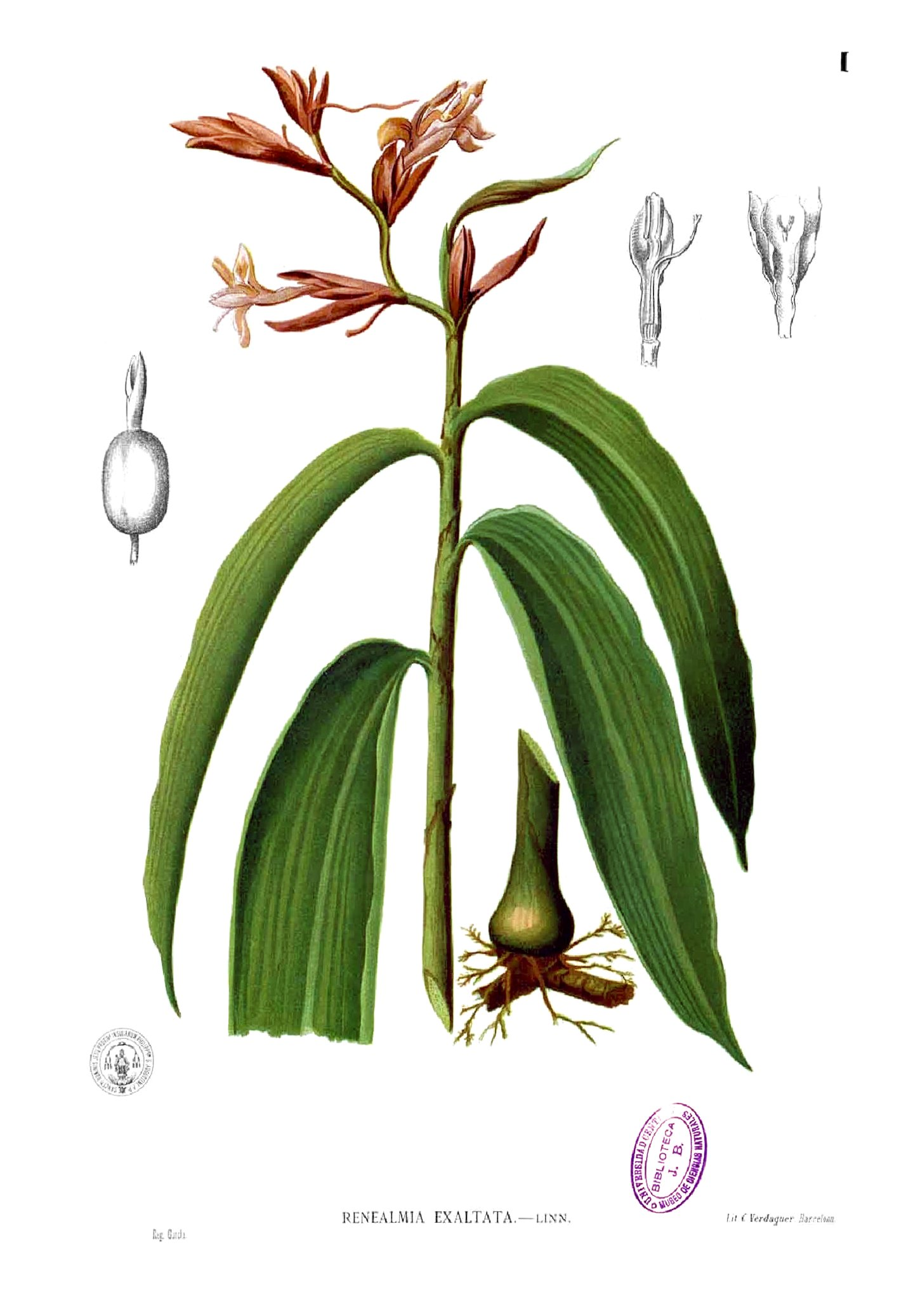
- Botanical illustration of R. alpinia from Flora de Filipinas by Francisco Manuel Blanco

Scientific classification
- Kingdom: Plantae
- Clade: Tracheophytes
- Clade: Angiosperms
- Clade: Monocots
- Clade: Commelinids
- Order: Zingiberales
- Family: Zingiberaceae
- Genus: Renealmia
- Species: R. alpinia

Binomial name
- Renealmia alpinia (Rottb.) Maas (1975)

Synonyms
- Alpinia exaltata (L. f.) Roem. & Schult.; Amomum alpinia Rottb.; Renealmia exaltata L. f.

= Renealmia alpinia =

Species of plant

Renealmia alpinia is a flowering plant species native to the Americas, where it grows from southern Mexico through much of South America, though not in the Southern Cone. It can also be found on several Caribbean islands.

In Quechua it is called misk'i p'anqa (misk'i sweet; honey, p'anqa bract, "sweet bract" or "honey bract"). The name alludes to R. alpinia's value as a culinary herb, especially for flavoring fish. Among Spanish-speakers this species is known as jenjibre-de-jardin ("garden ginger"). Both jenjibre-de-jardin and ginger (Zingiber officinale) are in the family Zingiberaceae.

Renealmia alpinia is commonly known as mardi gras in Trinidad, where hunters administer it either orally or topically to their hunting dogs to treat a variety of conditions, from sprains to snakebite.

In Suriname it's known as masoesa.

== Biochemistry ==
Zhou et al. (1997) of the Virginia Polytechnic Institute and State University identified three diterpenes produced by R. alpinia: 11-hydroxy-8(17),12(E)-labdadien-15,-16-dial 11,15-hemiacetal (1) and 16-oxo-8(17),12(E)-labdadien-15-oic acid (2), which are labdane diterpenes, and 8(17),12(E)-labdadien-15,16-dial (3). The team performed these assays on the basis of reports that R. alpinia may be antipyretic (fever-reducing).

== Biogeography ==
In Mexico, wild R. alpinia populations have been found in the southern states of Chiapas, Oaxaca, and Veracruz. It also grows on the Caribbean islands of Dominica, Grenada, Guadeloupe, Martinique, Montserrat, Puerto Rico, St. Kitts, Nevis, Trinidad, and Tobago.

In Central America, it grows in Belize, Costa Rica, Guatemala, Honduras, and Panama.

In South America, it is found in Brazil, Colombia, Ecuador, French Guiana, Guyana, Peru, Suriname, and Venezuela.
