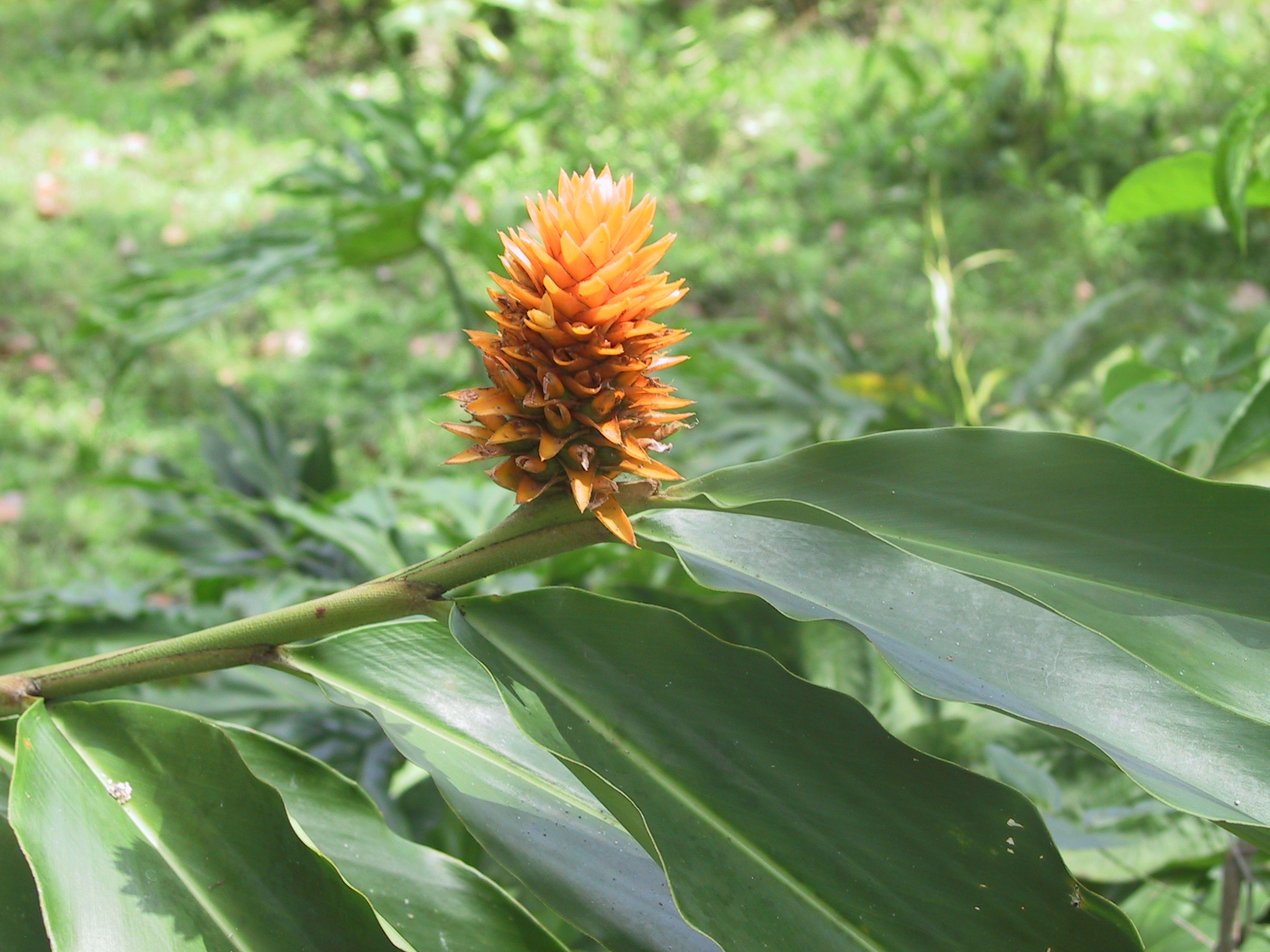
- Renealmia cernua

Scientific classification
- Kingdom: Plantae
- Clade: Tracheophytes
- Clade: Angiosperms
- Clade: Monocots
- Clade: Commelinids
- Order: Zingiberales
- Family: Zingiberaceae
- Subfamily: Alpinioideae
- Tribe: Alpinieae
- Genus: Renealmia; L.f., conserved name

Synonyms
- Alpinia L., rejected name; Amomum Ruiz & Pav., rejected name; Gethyra Salisb., without description; Peperidium Lindl., without description; Siphotria Raf.; Ethanium Salisb. ex Kuntze, illegitimate superfluous name

= Renealmia =

Genus of flowering plants

Renealmia is a plant genus in the family Zingiberaceae. Its members are native to tropical Africa and tropical America (Latin America and the West Indies). In Peru, fruits and tubers are sources of indigenous dyes. and indigenous medical treatments for leishmania and malaria In Colombia, it is used to treat snakebite. Bracts and leaves can serve as phytotelmata, retaining small quantities of water that offer habitat for other organisms.

Species include:

- Renealmia acreana Maas - Brazil (Acre State)
- Renealmia africana Benth. - western and central Africa from Togo to Angola
- Renealmia alborosea K.Schum. in H.G.A.Engler - Cameroon
- Renealmia alpinia (Rottb.) Maas - Latin America and the West Indies from Veracruz and Puerto Rico south to Bolivia
- Renealmia alticola Maas - Colombia
- Renealmia angustifolia K.Schum. in H.G.A.Engler - Espírito Santo
- Renealmia aromatica (Aubl.) Griseb. - Latin America and the West Indies from Veracruz and Puerto Rico south to Bolivia
- Renealmia asplundii Maas - Colombia, Ecuador, Peru
- Renealmia aurantifera Maas - Ecuador
- Renealmia batangana K.Schum. in H.G.A.Engler - Cameroon
- Renealmia battenbergiana Cummins ex Baker - Ghana, Ivory Coast
- Renealmia brachythyrsa Loes. - Cameroon
- Renealmia bracteata De Wild. & T.Durand - Congo-Brazzaville, Zaïre, Uganda
- Renealmia brasiliensis K.Schum. in H.G.A.Engler - Brazil
- Renealmia breviscapa Poepp. & Endl. - Brazil, Bolivia, Peru, Ecuador, Colombia
- Renealmia cabrae De Wild. & T.Durand - Congo-Brazzaville, Zaïre, Gabon, Cameroon
- Renealmia caucana Maas - Colombia
- Renealmia cernua (Sw. ex Roem. & Schult.) J.F.Macbr. - Latin America from Chiapas to Peru
- Renealmia chalcochlora K.Schum. in H.G.A.Engler - Colombia
- Renealmia chiriquina Standl. - Panamá
- Renealmia choroniensis Maas - Venezuela
- Renealmia chrysotricha Petersen - Rio de Janeiro
- Renealmia cincinnata (K.Schum.) T.Durand & Schinz - west-central Africa from Ivory Coast to Congo-Brazzaville
- Renealmia concinna Standl. - Costa Rica, Panama, Colombia
- Renealmia congesta Maas - Costa Rica, Panama
- Renealmia congoensis Gagnep. - Congo-Brazzaville, Zaïre, Gabon, Cameroon, Cabinda
- Renealmia congolana De Wild. & T.Durand - Congo-Brazzaville, Zaïre, Rwanda, Uganda, Tanzania
- Renealmia costaricensis Standl. - Costa Rica, Panama, Colombia, Ecuador
- Renealmia cuatrecasasii Maas - Colombia, Ecuador
- Renealmia cylindrica Maas & H.Maas - Panama, Colombia, Ecuador
- Renealmia densiflora Urb. - Haiti
- Renealmia densispica Koechlin - Gabon, Cameroon
- Renealmia dermatopetala K.Schum. in H.G.A.Engler - Brazil, Bolivia
- Renealmia dewevrei De Wild. & T.Durand - Zaïre
- Renealmia dolichocalyx Maas - Ecuador
- Renealmia dressleri Maas - Panama
- Renealmia engleri K.Schum. in H.G.A.Engler - Kenya, Tanzania, Zambia
- Renealmia erythrocarpa Standl. - Costa Rica, Panama, Nicaragua
- Renealmia ferruginea Maas - Colombia
- Renealmia floribunda K.Schum. in H.G.A.Engler - Trinidad and northern South America
- Renealmia foliifera Standl. - Costa Rica, Panama, Colombia
- Renealmia fragilis Maas - Colombia, Ecuador
- Renealmia guianensis Maas - Guianas, Venezuela, northern Brazil, Venezuelan Antilles
- Renealmia heleniae Maas - Panama
- Renealmia jamaicensis (Gaertn.) Horan. - Bahamas, Cuba, Jamaica, Hispaniola, Puerto Rico
- Renealmia krukovii Maas - Colombia, Peru, Brazil
- Renealmia laxa K.Schum. in H.G.A.Engler - Cameroon
- Renealmia ligulata Maas - Costa Rica, Panama, Colombia, Ecuador
- Renealmia longifolia K.Schum. in H.G.A.Engler - Liberia, Ivory Coast
- Renealmia lucida Maas - Costa Rica, Colombia, Ecuador
- Renealmia macrocolea K.Schum. in H.G.A.Engler - Togo, Cabinda, Cameroon, Gabon
- Renealmia maculata Stapf in H.Johnston - Liberia, Ivory Coast
- Renealmia mannii Hook.f. - Bioko
- Renealmia matogrossensis Maas - Mato Grosso
- Renealmia mexicana Klotzsch ex Petersen - southern Mexico, Central America, Venezuela
- Renealmia microcalyx Maas & H.Maas - Brazil, Venezuela
- Renealmia monosperma Miq. - widespread from Panama east to the Guianas and south to Bolivia
- Renealmia nicolaioides Loes. - Venezuela, Colombia, Ecuador, Peru, Brazil
- Renealmia oligosperma K.Schum. in H.G.A.Engler - Ecuador
- Renealmia oligotricha Maas - Ecuador
- Renealmia orinocensis Rusby - Venezuela, Guianas
- Renealmia pacifica (Maas) Maas & H.Maas - southern Mexico, Guatemala, El Salvador
- Renealmia pallida Maas - Peru
- Renealmia petasites Gagnep. - Brazil
- Renealmia pirrensis Maas & H.Maas - Panama
- Renealmia pluriplicata Maas - Colombia, Ecuador, Central America
- Renealmia polyantha K.Schum. in H.G.A.Engler - Gabon, Cameroon, Congo-Brazzaville
- Renealmia polypus Gagnep. - Gabon, Cameroon, Congo-Brazzaville, Cabinda
- Renealmia puberula Steyerm. - Colombia, Ecuador
- Renealmia purpurea Maas & H.Maas - Peru
- Renealmia pycnostachys K.Schum. in H.G.A.Engler - Minas Gerais (probably extinct)
- Renealmia pyramidalis (Lam.) Maas - Lesser Antilles
- Renealmia racemosa Poepp. & Endl. - Peru, Bolivia
- Renealmia reticulata Gagnep. - Espírito Santo, Rio de Janeiro
- Renealmia sancti-thomae I.M.Turner - São Tomé
- Renealmia scaposa Maas - Costa Rica
- Renealmia sessilifolia Gagnep. - Ecuador
- Renealmia stellulata Steyerm. - Ecuador, Peru
- Renealmia stenostachys K.Schum. in H.G.A.Engler - Cameroon
- Renealmia striata (Stokes) Govaerts ex Maas - Jamaica
- Renealmia thyrsoidea (Ruiz & Pav.) Poepp. & Endl. - Brazil, Bolivia, Venezuela, Peru, Ecuador, Colombia, Suriname, Guyana, Trinidad, Panama, Costa Rica
- Renealmia urbaniana Loes. - Brazil, Peru, Ecuador, Colombia
- Renealmia vallensis Maas - Colombia
- Renealmia variegata Maas & H.Maas - Ecuador, Colombia, Panama
- Renealmia wurdackii Maas - Peru, Ecuador
