= Hellshire Beach =

- Beach
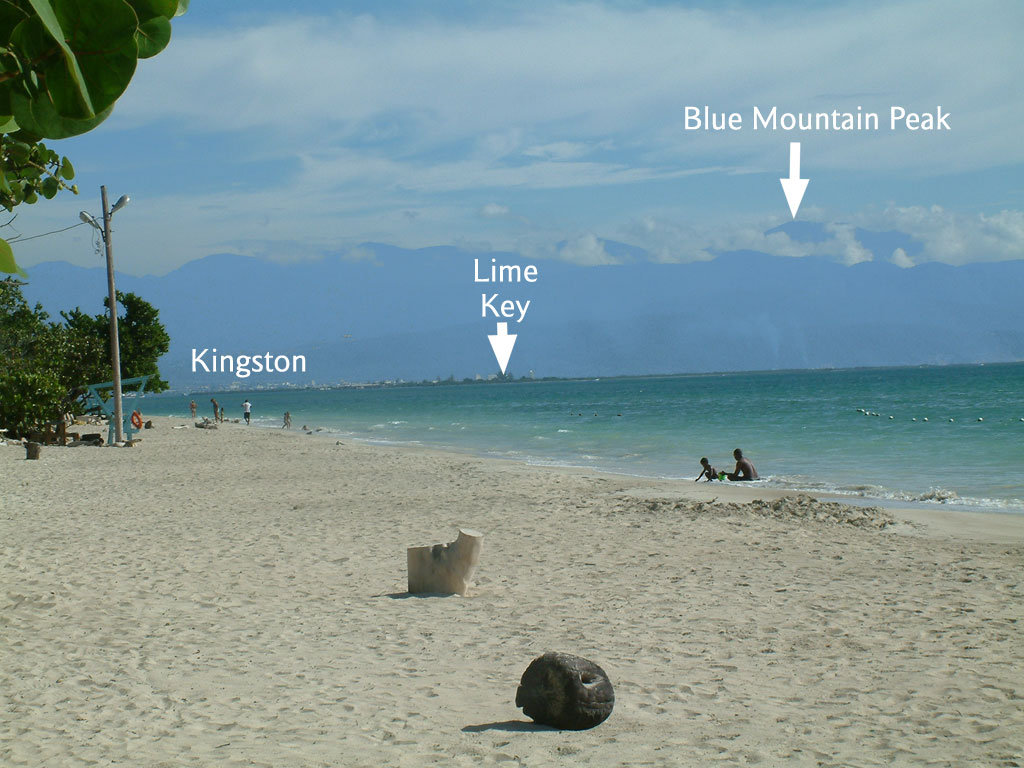
- The paying section of Hellshire Beach looking east towards Kingston and the Blue Mountains.

- Location within Jamaica
- Coordinates: 17.8973962°N 76.8945444°W
- Country: Jamaica
- Parish: St Catherine
- Time zone: UTC-5 (EST)

Hellshire Beach, Jamaica, is located near Portmore, and famed for its fried fish and safe swimming. It has near white sands with a very small trace of black sand. Exposed when there is a sea running to the south, the waters close to shore are often quite cloudy due to the stirred up sand.

It is a popular public beach conveniently located for the residents of Portmore and weekend visitors from Kingston.

== Runaway community ==
Once called "Healthshire" due to its reputation as a health retreat its name has since evolved into "Hellshire" though both pronunciations are technically correct.

In the early nineteenth century, colonial records describe hundreds of runaway slaves escaping to "Healthshire" where they flourished for several years as a community of Free black people in Jamaica before they were captured by a party of Jamaican Maroons.

== Paid entry section ==
There is a section with life guards and a buoyed off swimming area approximately 200 m long. It has changing/showering facilities which are kept fairly clean. This has a number of tables and benches in the shade of grapenut trees and there is a fish restaurant and bar.

== Free section ==
Further to the west there is a free entry to the beach and here there are a large number of fried fish and other stalls.

== See also ==
- List of beaches in Jamaica
