= Blue Mountains (Jamaica) =

Jamaican mountain range

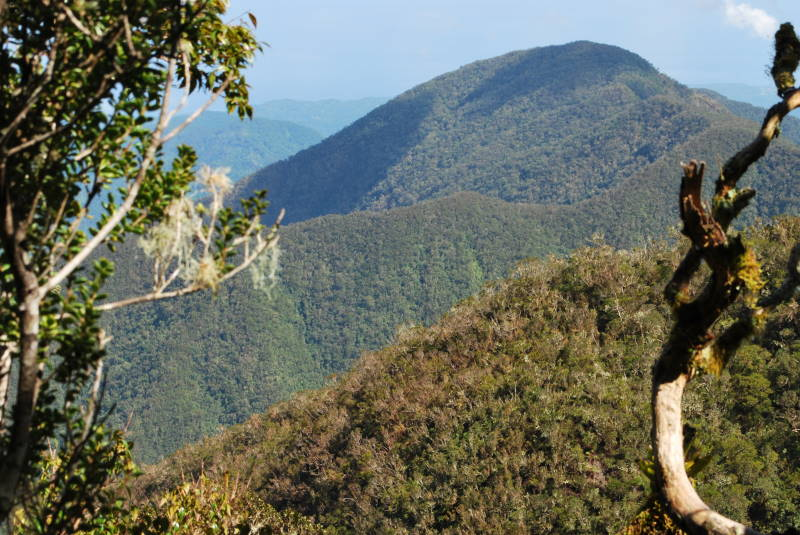
- View of the Blue Mountain Range looking into Saint Mary Parish

Highest point
- Peak: Blue Mountain Peak
- Elevation: 2,256 m (7,402 ft)
- Coordinates: 18°6′N 76°40′W

Geography
- Country: Jamaica

UNESCO World Heritage Site
- Official name: Blue and John Crow Mountains
- Type: Mixed
- Criteria: iii, vi, x
- Designated: 2015 (39th session)
- Reference no.: 1356
- Region: Americas

The Blue Mountains are the longest mountain range in Jamaica. They include the island's highest point, Blue Mountain Peak, at 2,256 m (7,402 ft). From the summit, accessible via a walking track, both the north and south coasts of the island can be seen. On a clear day, the outline of the island of Cuba, 210 km (130 mi) away, can also be seen. The mountain range spans four parishes: Portland, St Thomas, St Mary and St Andrew.

== Geography ==
The Blue Mountains dominate the eastern third of Jamaica, while bordering the eastern parishes of Portland, Saint Thomas, Saint Mary and Saint Andrew to the south. Part of the Blue Mountains is contained in the Blue and John Crow Mountains National Park established in 1992, which is maintained by the Jamaican government.

The Blue Mountains rise to their summits from the coastal plain in the space of about 16 kilometres (9.9 mi), thus producing one of the steepest general gradients in the world. This provides cooling relief from the sweltering heat of the city of Kingston, visible below. Their summits rise and fall for 38.62 kilometres (24.00 mi) and span 22.53 kilometres (14.00 mi) at their widest point. The temperature decreases from around 27 °C (81 °F) at sea level to 5 °C (41 °F) at the Blue Mountain Peak, just 16 km (9.9 mi) inland.

=== Rainfall ===
The island's average rainfall is 1,960 millimetres (77 in) per year. Where the higher elevations of the Blue Mountains catch the rain from moisture-laden winds it exceeds 5,080 millimetres (200 in) per year with some areas recording totals of more than 7,620 millimetres (300 in).

=== Climate ===
High elevations of the Blue Mountains have a subtropical highland climate (Cfb) under the Köppen climate classification.

Climate data for Blue Mountains (altitude: 1,493 metres (4,898 ft))
Month	Jan	Feb	Mar	Apr	May	Jun	Jul	Aug	Sep	Oct	Nov	Dec	Year
Mean daily maximum °C (°F)	20.0 (68.0)	19.9 (67.8)	21.0 (69.8)	21.5 (70.7)	21.8 (71.2)	22.9 (73.2)	23.7 (74.7)	23.7 (74.7)	23.0 (73.4)	21.9 (71.4)	21.1 (70.0)	20.4 (68.7)	21.7 (71.1)
Mean daily minimum °C (°F)	11.9 (53.4)	11.7 (53.1)	12.0 (53.6)	12.6 (54.7)	13.5 (56.3)	14.2 (57.6)	14.7 (58.5)	15.0 (59.0)	14.4 (57.9)	14.5 (58.1)	14.0 (57.2)	12.9 (55.2)	13.5 (56.3)
Average precipitation mm (inches)	126 (5.0)	116 (4.6)	103 (4.1)	172 (6.8)	219 (8.6)	141 (5.6)	79 (3.1)	179 (7.0)	226 (8.9)	343 (13.5)	396 (15.6)	235 (9.3)	2,335 (91.9)
Average precipitation days	12	9	9	11	14	9	7	10	14	17	16	14	142
Average relative humidity (%) (at 13:00)	83	84	84	85	86	83	80	83	87	90	88	87	85
Mean monthly sunshine hours	127.1	87.6	145.7	132.0	124.0	138.0	155.0	145.7	129.0	127.1	126.0	124.0	1,561.2
Mean daily sunshine hours	4.1	3.1	4.7	4.4	4.0	4.6	5.0	4.7	4.3	4.1	4.2	4.0	4.3
Source: Meteorological Service (Jamaica)

== Biodiversity ==
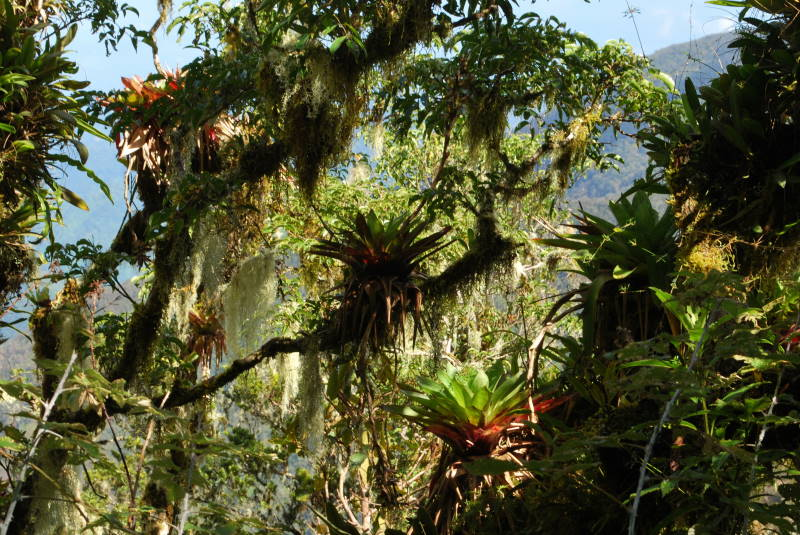
Cloud forest trees covered with epiphytes.

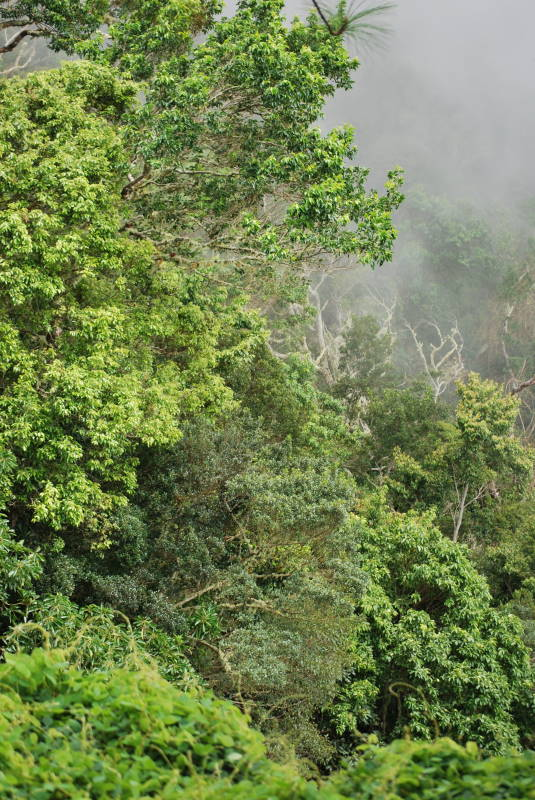
Canopies exposed to frequent mist.

The region supports a notable concentration of endemic Caribbean lineages and functions as an important refuge for biodiversity. Its steep elevational gradient—rising from sea level to more than 2,200 metres over roughly 16 kilometres—creates sharp ecological transitions across short distances. Moist trade winds are uplifted by the mountains, increasing cloud cover and precipitation and contributing to the recharge of the island’s main watersheds.

=== Altitudinal zonation ===
The biogeography of the Blue Mountains is strongly influenced by their topographic isolation and steep elevational range. The peaks rise from lowland tropical environments to approximately 2,256 metres (7,400 ft) over a short horizontal distance, creating a pronounced environmental gradient and a series of high-elevation habitats that are comparatively isolated from similar conditions elsewhere on the island.

The Blue Mountains climatic diversity has led to the growth of diverse and lush vegetation including towering trees and more than 500 species of flowering plants. Vegetation and habitat structure change with elevation, forming broadly defined belts that include:

Elevation Zone	Climate & Terrain	Defining Flora	Key Fauna	Major Threats
Elfin Woodland (Above 1,800m)	Constant Oceanic winds; temperatures drop down to $5\,^{\circ}\text{C}$.; saturated, acidic soils; continuous mist.	Short, stunted, gnarled trees (<5m); Blue Mountain Yacca (Podocarpus urbanii); thick carpets of Sphagnum moss.	Rare endemic-frogs (like Eleutherodactylus alticola); passing migrant warblers.	Severe wind damage from hurricanes; trail erosion from foot traffic.
Upper Montane (1,500m–1,800m)	Classic cloud forest; cool and damp; high canopy condensation from thick fog bands.	Tree ferns; wild ginger (Renealmia jamaicensis); rare orchids, mosses, and tank bromeliads.	Jamaican blackbird; Jamaican elaenia; the Blue Mountain Anole (Anolis reconditus).	Invasive Australian Cheesewood (Pittosporum undulatum) outcompeting native canopy trees.
Lower Montane (750m–1,500m)	Transitional climate; moderate temperatures and high rainfall; steep, draining slopes.	Broadleaf evergreen trees; Jamaican Cedar; wild figs; climbing ferns (Odontosoria).	Homerus Swallowtail Butterfly (Papilio homerus); Jamaican coney (Geocapromys brownii).	Heavy habitat fragmentation from Blue Mountain Coffee plantations and agricultural clearing.
Lowland Forest (Below 750m)	Tropical and humid; temperatures averaging 27 °C (81 °F); fast-flowing, erosive river systems.	Buttressed mahogany trees; silk cotton trees; dense networks of woody lianas.	Jamaican lizard cuckoo; Jamaican spindalis; Jamaican boa; stream-dwelling freshwater crabs.	Extensive historical logging; urban encroachment; widespread replacement by non-native fruit.

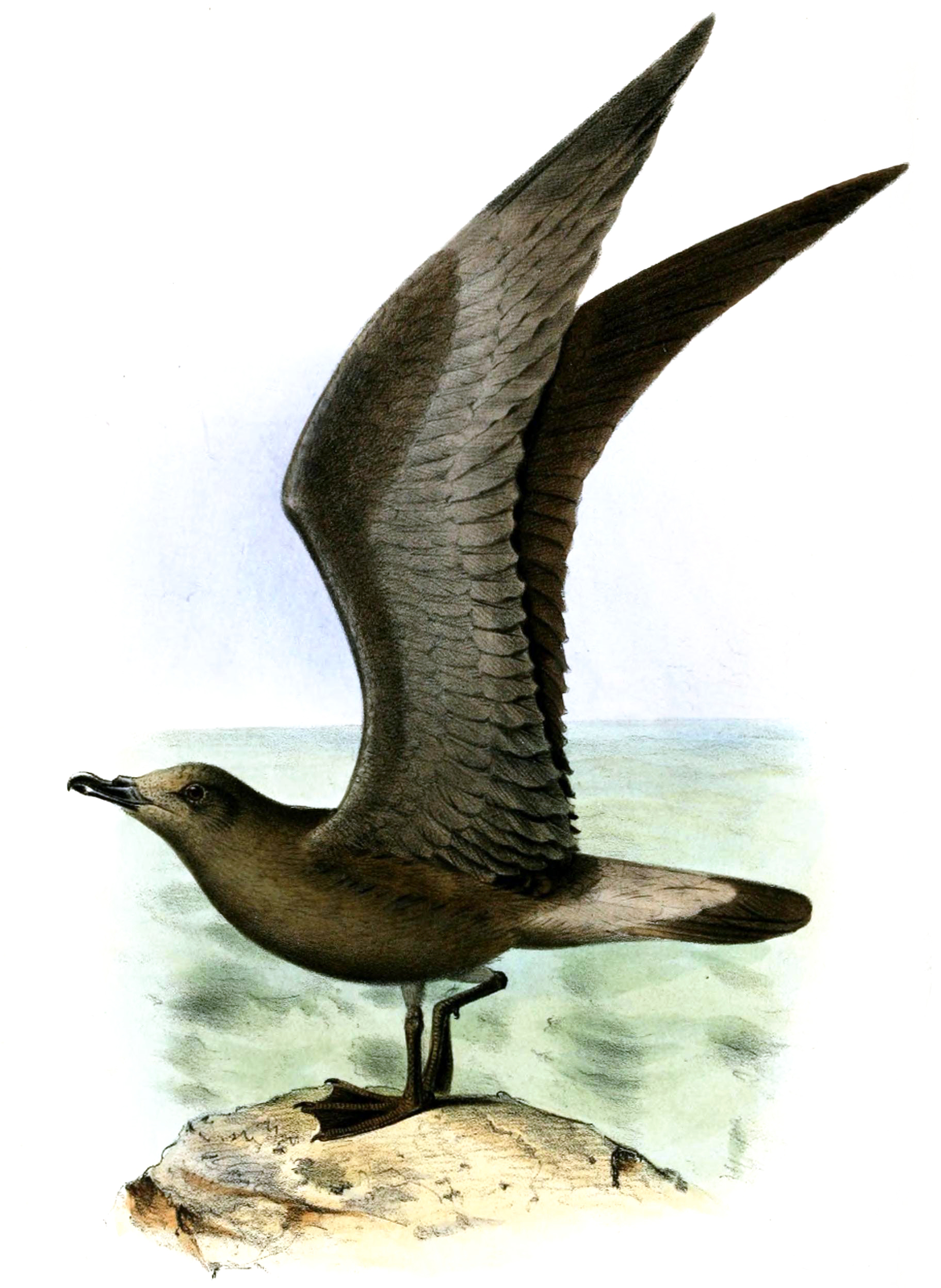
The Jamaican Petrel (Pterodroma caribbaea) was last seen in 1879.

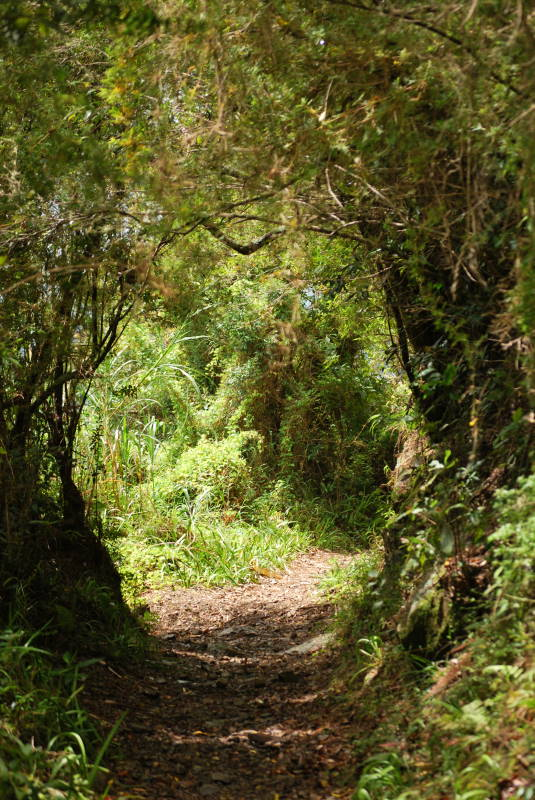
Montane Rainforest

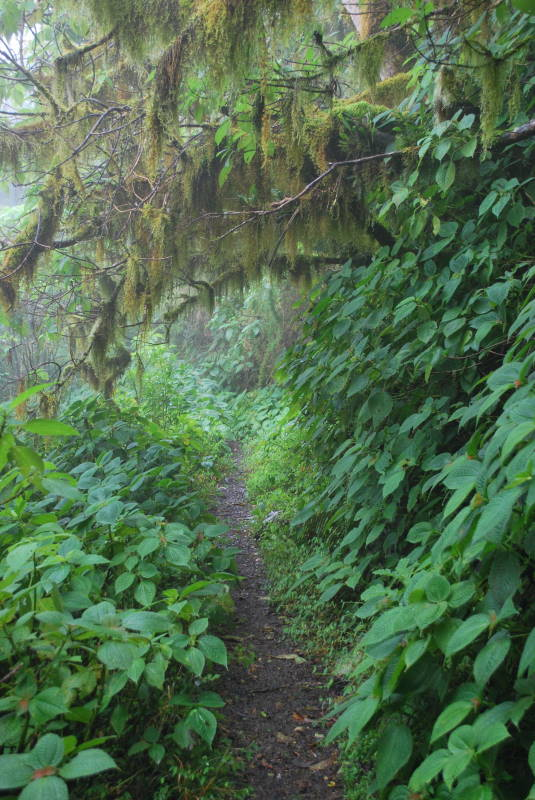
Cloud Forest

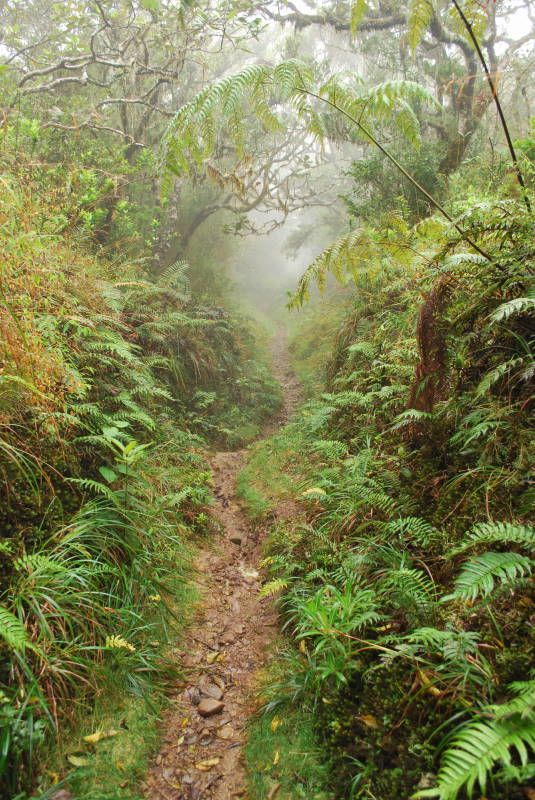
Elfin Woodland

=== Endemism ===
This elevational structure is associated with high levels of endemism in montane plant and animal communities.

- The mountains are home to the world's second-largest butterfly and the largest in the Americas, the Homerus swallowtail. This is the most well-studied remaining population of the endangered butterfly.
- The Jamaican coney, a type of hutia and Jamaica's only native land mammal, as well as the Jamaican boa and wintering Bicknell's thrushes, are found here.
- The Jamaican Petrel (Pterodroma caribbaea). The only proven nesting was in the Blue and John Crow Mountains, where it was last seen in 1879.

High endemism in the montane zones is commonly attributed to a combination of climatic history and fine-scale geographic barriers. During cooler climatic periods, montane species could expand downslope; subsequent warming is thought to have restricted cool-adapted populations to higher elevations, increasing isolation through time.

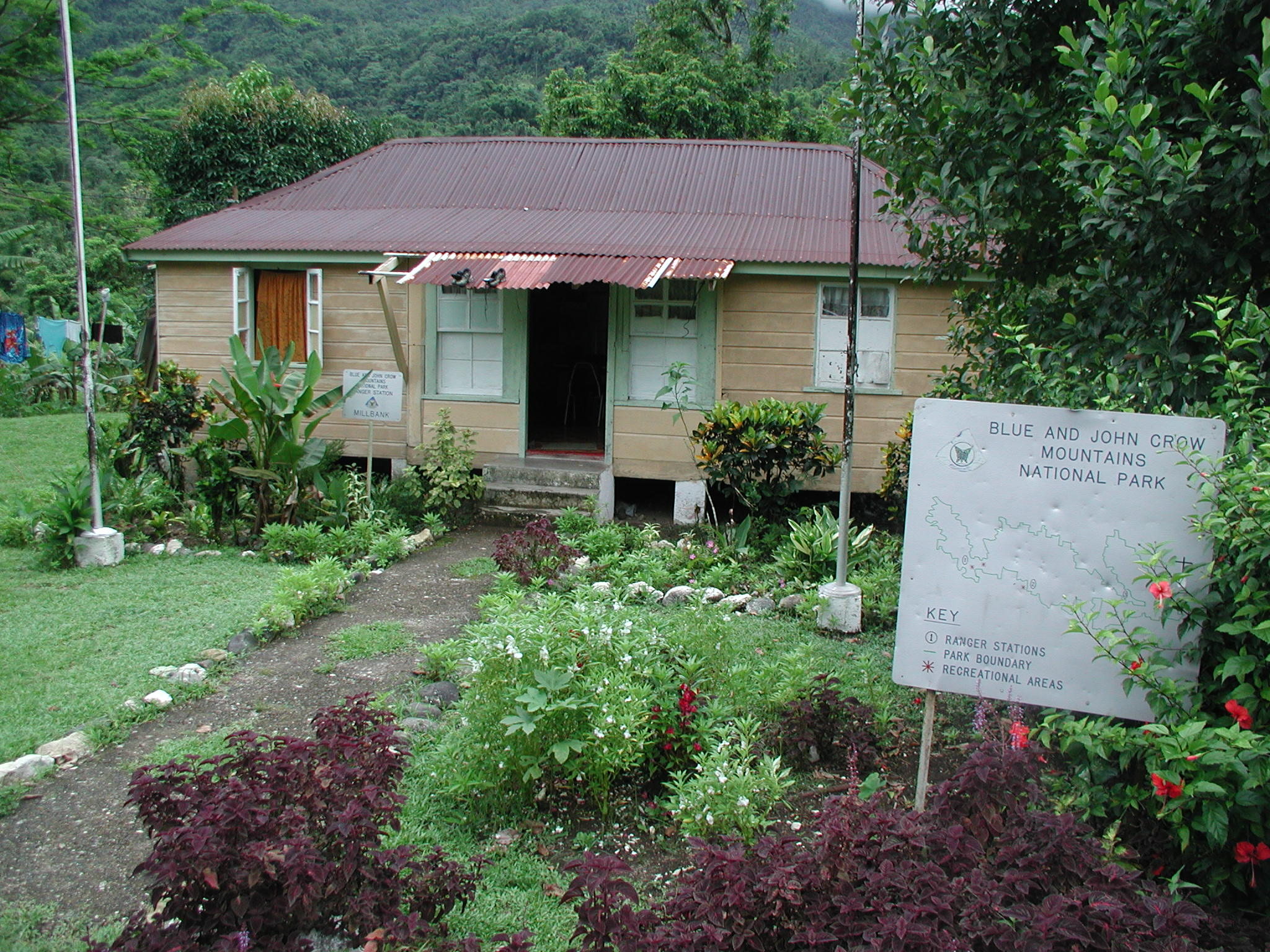
Blue Mountain - John Crow Mountain Ranger Station

=== Conservation ===
The mountains have been designated an Important Bird Area (IBA) by BirdLife International because they support significant populations of many Jamaican bird species.

The Critical Ecosystem Partnership Fund (CEPF) identifies the Blue and John Crow Mountains cloud forests as a critically vulnerable, high-endemism habitat characterized by a 50% plant endemism rate and specialized species, such as the Jamaican Blackbird. The ecosystem, which provides up to 40% of local water via horizontal precipitation, faces immediate threats from the invasive Australian Cheesewood tree and long-term climatic squeeze from rising temperatures.

== Jamaican coffee ==
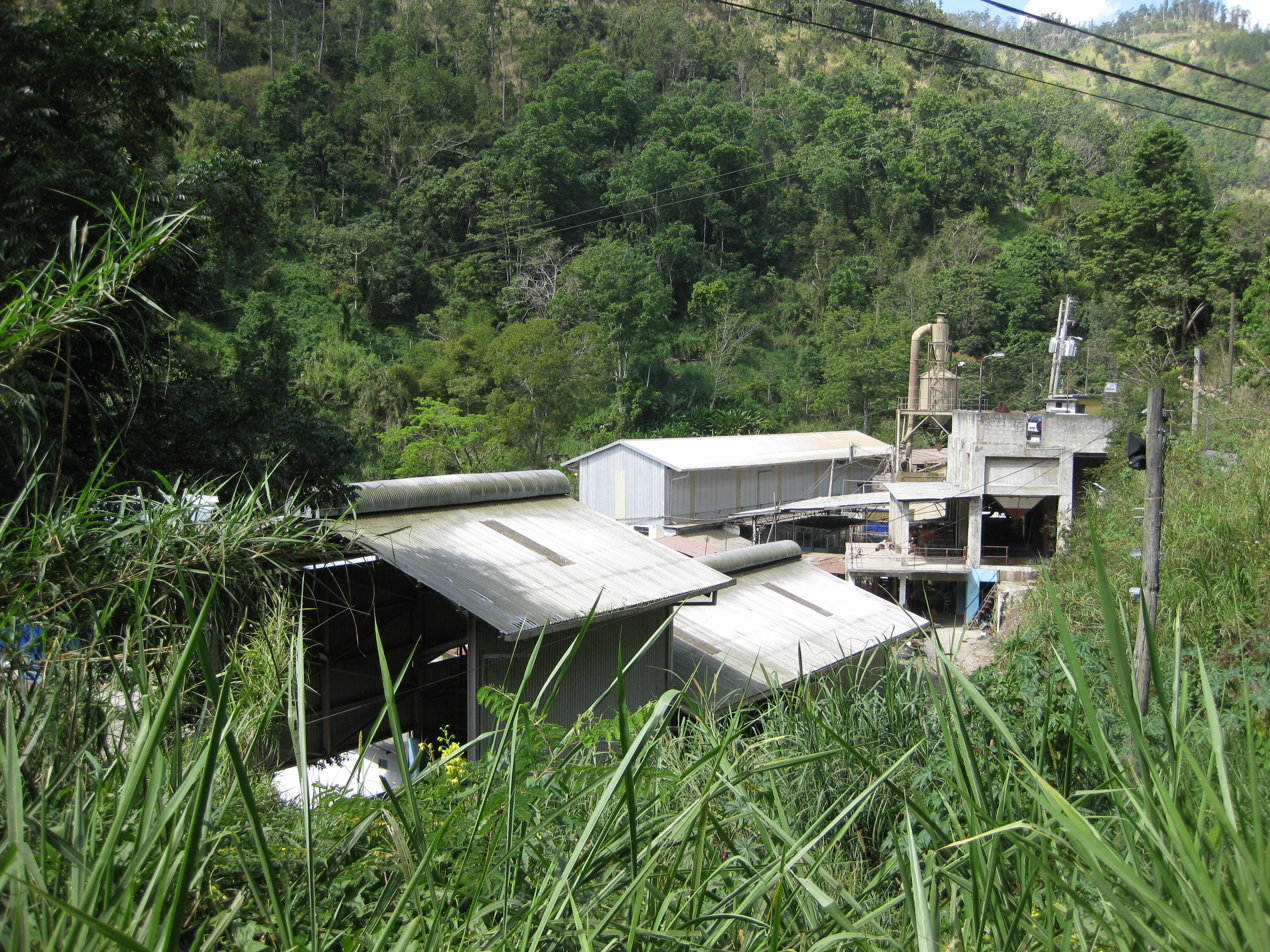
Mavis Bank Coffee Factory Blue Mountains, as seen looking down the hill from the road.

When Jamaica's economy was dominated by plantation slavery, some slaves escaped to the mountains to live independently, where they were known as Jamaican Maroons. Charles Town, Jamaica on the Buff Bay River in central Portland, Moore Town in eastern Portland, and Scott's Hall, Jamaica in St Mary are the contemporary communities of Windward Maroons.

Today, the famous Jamaican Blue Mountain Coffee, which commands premium prices on world markets, is cultivated between 0.6 and 1.5 kilometres (0.37 and 0.93 mi) above sea level, while higher slopes are preserved as forest. Hagley Gap and Mavis Bank are farming communities located on Blue Mountain, with Hagley Gap being closest to Blue Mountain Peak. Both towns rely upon the area's rich soil for growing coffee.

== Gallery ==
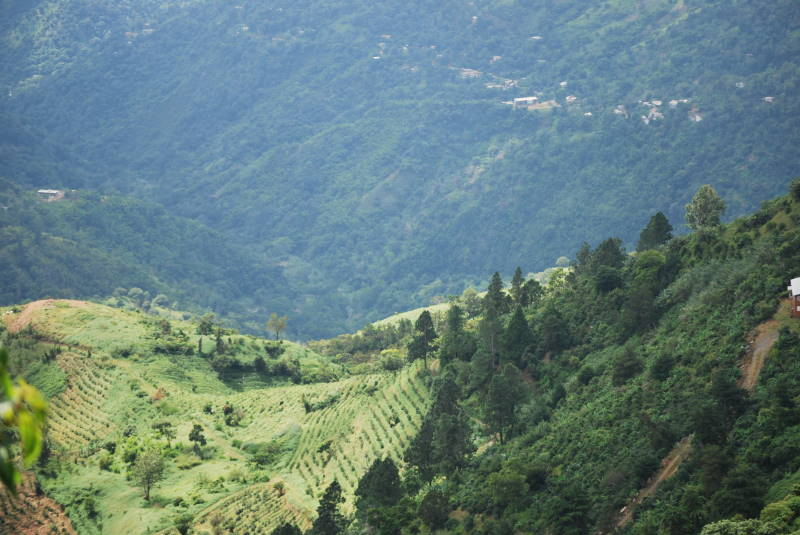

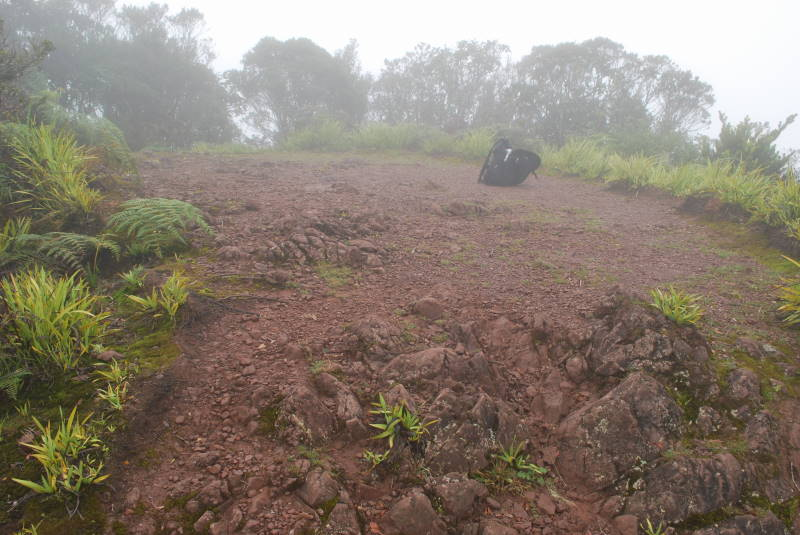

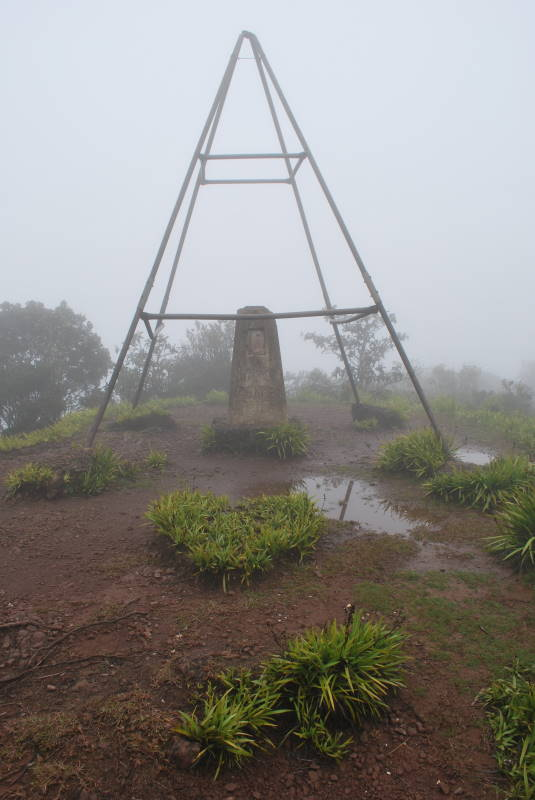

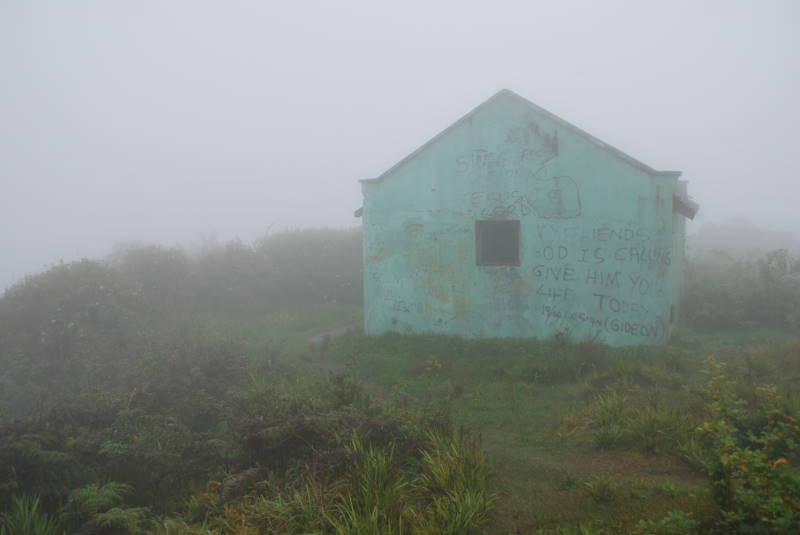

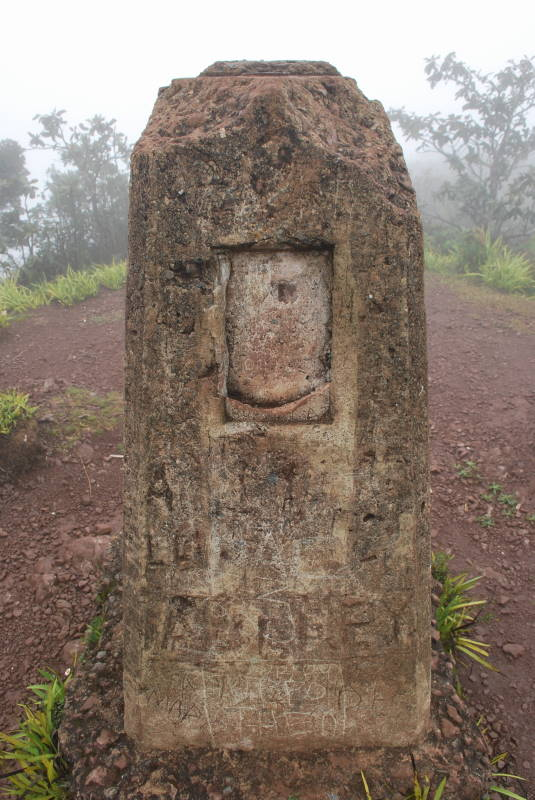
