= Cudjoe =

Jamaican Maroon leader Monday d.c. 1764)

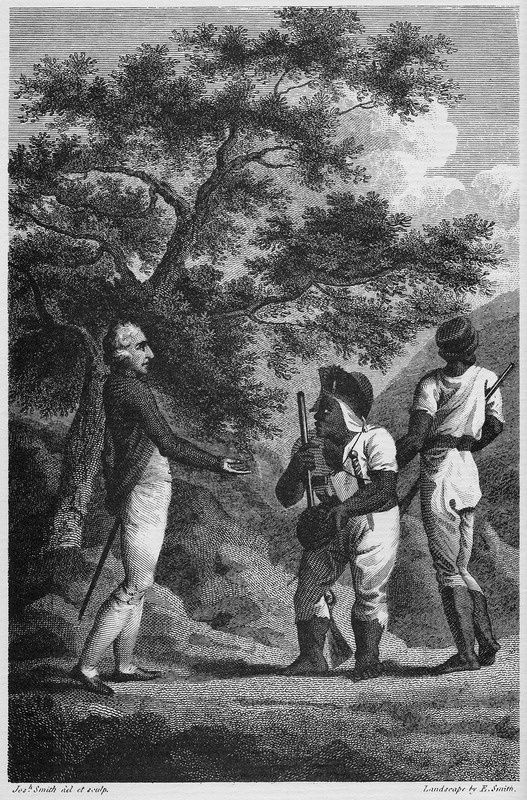
The Leeward Maroon leader Cudjoe parleying with the planter John Guthrie

Cudjoe, Codjoe or Captain Cudjoe (d. c. 1764), sometimes spelled Cudjo – corresponding to the Akan day name Kojo, Codjoe or Kwadwo – was a Maroon leader in Jamaica during the time of Nanny of the Maroons. In Akan, Cudjoe or Kojo is the name given to a boy born on a Monday. He has been described as "the greatest of the Maroon leaders."

The Jamaican Maroons are descended from Africans who moved outside the realm of slavery either by force or physical movement and established communities of African people in the mountains of the Colony of Jamaica during the era of slavery on the island. Enslaved Africans imported during the Spanish period may have been the first self-liberated Africans ("runaways"), possibly mixing with the Indigenous peoples. Some more slaves may have gained liberty when the English attacked Jamaica and took it in 1655, and subsequently. Cudjoe was the leader of a community of self-liberated Africans known as Cudjoe's Town (Trelawny Town). For about half a century, until the 1739 and 1740 peace treaties with the British rulers of the island, the Maroons operated outside the sphere of direct British control.

== Origins of Cudjoe ==
Enslaved Africans in western Jamaica ran away into the Cockpit Country and established the first community of Leeward Maroons in the mountainous interior of the island. The self-liberated Africans were called Maroons, after the Spanish word cimarrón, meaning “runaway slave”.

The Leeward Maroons most likely emerged in 1690 when there was a Coromantee rebellion on Sutton's estate in western Jamaica, and most of these enslaved Africans ran away to form the Leeward Maroons. Cudjoe was probably the son of one of the leaders of this revolt.

Milton McFarlane explains that his family's Accompong Town Maroon oral history states that Cudjoe was the freeborn son of Naquan, who was the leader of the self-liberated Africans who fled from Sutton's estate. According to contemporary white enslavers, Cudjoe challenged a Madagascan self-liberated African for the leadership of the Leeward Maroons in 1720, and when he defeated and killed his challenger, Cudjoe became the undisputed leader of these western Maroons.

== Description ==
White colonial physician R. C. Dallas, who wrote his account half a century after Cudjoe lived, claimed the Maroon leader was short and stout, with a "wildness in his manners". He also described Cudjoe as having "a very large lump of flesh upon his back, which was partly covered by the tattered remains of an old blue coat, of which the skirts and the sleeves below the elbow were wanting." Slaver Thomas Thistlewood, who actually met Cudjoe in 1750, noted in his diary that "he had on a feather’d hat, Sword at his Side, gun upon his Shoulder...Bare foot and Bare legg’d, somewhat a Majestic look".

== Treaty with the British ==
During the First Maroon War of the 1730s, the English colonial forces failed to secure any significant victories against Cudjoe's Leeward Maroons.

In 1739, Cudjoe reached an agreement with the British that recognized the Leeward Maroons as a semi-autonomous entity. The Maroons also received a large tract of land and would not have to pay any taxes on it. However, Cudjoe, in return for this recognition of autonomy, promised to return self-liberated Africans and help put down future liberation movements ("slave rebellions"). In the 1740s, some Leeward Maroons who opposed the 1739 treaty rose in revolt, but Cudjoe crushed those rebellions.

Although there is a source that claims Cudjoe died in 1744 Jamaican writers Edward Long and Thomas Thistlewood wrote of personal encounters with Cudjoe in the 1750s and 1760s. In the last written reference, Long described how Cudjoe led his Leeward Maroons in a martial performance at Montego Bay for Governor Sir William Lyttleton in 1764. That same year, Thistlewood reported receiving news that "Colonel Cudjoe is dead some time ago".

== Legacy ==
The treaty of 1739 named Accompong as Cudjoe's successor, and Accompong tried to take control of Trelawny Town when Cudjoe died in 1764. However, the governor, Roger Hope Elletson, asserted his new authority over the Leeward Maroons. Elletson instructed Superintendent John James to take the Trelawny Town badge of authority away from Accompong, and to give it to a Trelawny Town Maroon officer named Lewis. James instructed Accompong that he was to only have authority over Accompong Town.

Cudjoe Day is celebrated in Jamaica on the first Monday in January.
