= Samuel Oughton =

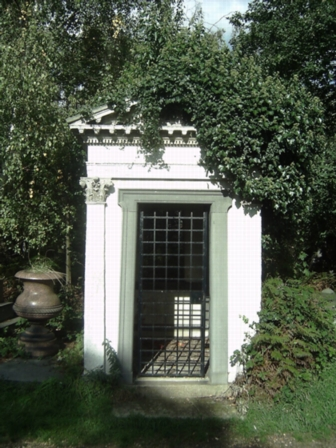
Memorial Plaques to Rev Samuel Oughton and Sarah Oughton, lie inside the Rogers Family Mausoleum at Abney Park Cemetery

The Rev. Samuel Oughton (1803 – December 1881), Baptist missionary to Jamaica 1836–1866, and colleague of William Knibb, was an abolitionist who became an outspoken advocate of black labour rights in Jamaica during the gradual abolition of slavery in the late 1830s and thereafter. He was briefly imprisoned in Jamaica during 1840. Originally associated with James Sherman's Independent Congregational Surrey Chapel, Southwark, and from time to time invited back by Sherman, he was closely associated with the Baptists in Jamaica, who were largely organised along Congregational lines and among the predominantly African-Caribbean population, following their founding by George Lisle, a former slave from America.

== Early life in Jamaica ==
Samuel Oughton's work for the Baptist Missionary Society in Jamaica soon became well known. Arriving in 1836 from the Surrey Chapel in London, his posting was initially to help Thomas Burchell, a relative by marriage. However, by 1839 he was invited by the largely African congregation in Kingston to be their pastor at the prominent East Queen Street chapel.

This was a key time in the emancipation of Jamaican slaves. After "legal abolition" began in Jamaica with the home government's Slavery Abolition Act 1833, conditions were little better for many Africans in Jamaica for some decades; particularly under the dreaded "indentured apprenticeship" system of forced labour, which was taken to extremes by the Planters, some masters and their overseers compelling the use of treadmills.

The abuses of indentured apprenticeship were finally abolished on 1 August 1838, following a campaign led by Joseph Sturge, with support from the Baptists, the Society for the Mitigation and Gradual Abolition of Slavery Throughout the British Dominions (Anti-Slavery Society 1823–1838), and longstanding abolitionists such as William Allen. Even so, emancipation was no paradise; the planters frequently harassed tenants (see Free Villages) and sought to drive down wages when they could. Oughton once famously remarked to his flock in the parish of Hanover:

"Rather than work for less than 2s and 6d a day,

let the canes rot in the fields,

and the ships go home in ballast!"

For a time (during 1840) he was imprisoned by the Jamaican authorities for his outspoken views against liberties being taken by magistrates against African women. Back in Britain, Joseph Sturge of the British and Foreign Anti-Slavery Society (Anti-Slavery Society founded 1839) passed on Oughton's descriptions of the horrendous labour practices suffered by Africans in Jamaica, which Oughton continued to communicate whilst in prison. Joseph Sturge made representations to the Colonial Office on his behalf and Samuel Oughton was eventually discharged after a period released on bail. He records "simple but ardent expressions of delight and affection" from "our poor dear people", who welcomed him back to East Queen Street chapel with renewed hope. In 1841 Oughton was able to write: "my affection for the people, and theirs for me, seems to grow stronger by the day".

The Baptist returns at about this date show Samuel Oughton, assisted by George Rowse, to be responsible for three "sub stations", two "day schools", two "Sunday schools", and, besides Rowse, two further teachers – Miss Simpson and W. Spraggs.

== Oughton's moral code ==
In the 1844 elections Oughton was active in promoting African candidates, and most of his congregation were of African origin. He stayed at East Queen Street chapel as pastor for the next twenty years, although not without incident since he promoted a form of moral code that he applied to everyone, including the emancipated citizens whose status he had been invited to improve.

The legal status of one Baptist chapel was often slightly different from another since they had grown up in many ways. At one time George Lisle's chapel was his personal responsibility, and he was imprisoned for an outstanding debt on its construction. The more appropriate scheme of ownership was through some form of trust deed. Whilst Oughton supported the congregation's right to appoint trustees at one Chapel where this issue arose, the wish of his own congregation to do likewise at the East Queen Street Chapel became a cause of controversy since it had a different constitution. Oughton also faced a problem because all its trustees but one had died before dutifully appointing others, and so it became inquorate. Just as he had exposed wrongdoing by the magistrates, and been prepared to suffer imprisonment for a time, he would not be party to illegal ownership arrangements at his chapel whatever the price. A number of his congregation would have been happy with this, however, and put pressure on the remaining trustee to exceed his legal authority. Oughton's firm moral standards upset them; he again had to pay the price of unpopularity, just as when he had upset sections of the white population earlier.

In the 1860s Oughton departed from religion and education slightly, though in his inimitable moralistic way. He wrote two books in which he tried to promote a theory, originally popular with some French and English thinkers in the Age of Enlightenment, that a population must 'want' artificial things to create drive and hard work, and therefore increasing wealth. In such a seductively warm and fertile island as Jamaica, Oughton contended, this might not happen; people might content themselves after reaching a certain standard of living.

== The Jamaican Baptists and emancipation ==
The Baptist missions on Jamaica were closely involved in emancipation and reform. The mission was founded by the African George Lisle, a former slave from America. Their churches on Jamaica promoted the slave Samuel Sharpe (1801–32) to Deacon at the Burchell Baptist Church in Montego Bay, and later the African Paul Bogle (1822–1865), believed to have been born free, to Deacon in Stony Gut, north of Morant Bay.

There was progress, too, in encouraging political and social involvement of women. Positions of responsibility such as "assistant class leader", "class leader" and above were open to all who had the necessary reading and writing skills; men and women. One of the Baptists' cherished principles was of church self-government in which everyone was entitled to vote in elections and petitioning, which provided the first opportunity for many in the community to have their voice heard. This was one of the earliest routes through which the labouring poor began to have political influence. Progress was sometimes painfully slow, however, particularly for those who sought immediate self-government. At Samuel Oughton's chapel, Eleanor Vickars, an African assistant class-leader whose father is believed to have been a deacon, successfully stood for election as class-leader but did not meet the literacy requirement necessary for confirmation of her appointment. Samuel Oughton had to decide between the Baptists' cherished principles of self-government or upholding the literacy entry requirements arising from the hope that education would be "the great leveller". In the event, he avoided setting a precedent and called for both beliefs to be upheld equally, a route that did successfully lead to self-determination by African congregations.

It has been noted that female literacy was strongly encouraged by the Baptist Missionary Society. In 1841 the Baptist Herald and Friend of Africa was able to report thirty-six female teachers and over 2,000 girls in day schools. Back in Britain a training school for female teachers was also established; at Kettering.

== Family ==
Samuel's first wife was Hannah, a niece of Hester Burchell, who was the wife of Thomas Burchell. Samuel Oughton's second wife, Sarah (1819–1882), was sister of the wealthy British doctor and baptist Nathaniel Rogers MD. Samuel Oughton died in London in December 1881 and is buried along with Sarah, each with a memorial plaque, in the Rogers' Family Mausoleum at Abney Park Cemetery in Stoke Newington.

- A daughter, Lavinia Oughton, married Nonconformist author E. Paxton Hood.
- His youngest son, George Oughton (1842–1898), is remembered in South Australia as a bandleader and organist.
- His oldest son, Thomas S. Oughton (1825–1894), is remembered in Jamaica as a solicitor in Kingston, Jamaica. His life's work was mentioned upon his death in the Baptist Missionary Society, The Missionary Herald, 1 September 1894, p. 368.

== Books ==
- Oughton, Samuel (1845). The Church's Lamentation over Departed Greatness: A sermon, preached at East Queen Street Chapel, Kingston, Jamaica, on occasion of the death of the Rev. William Knibb, who departed this life, Nov. 15, 1845.

== See also ==
- History of Jamaica
- Slavery in the British and French Caribbean
