= Christianity in Jamaica =

Jamaican Christians
Total population
- approx. 1,960,000

Religions
- Baptist, Seventh-day Adventist, Roman Catholic, Anglican

Languages
- Main languages spoken are English and Jamaican Patois.

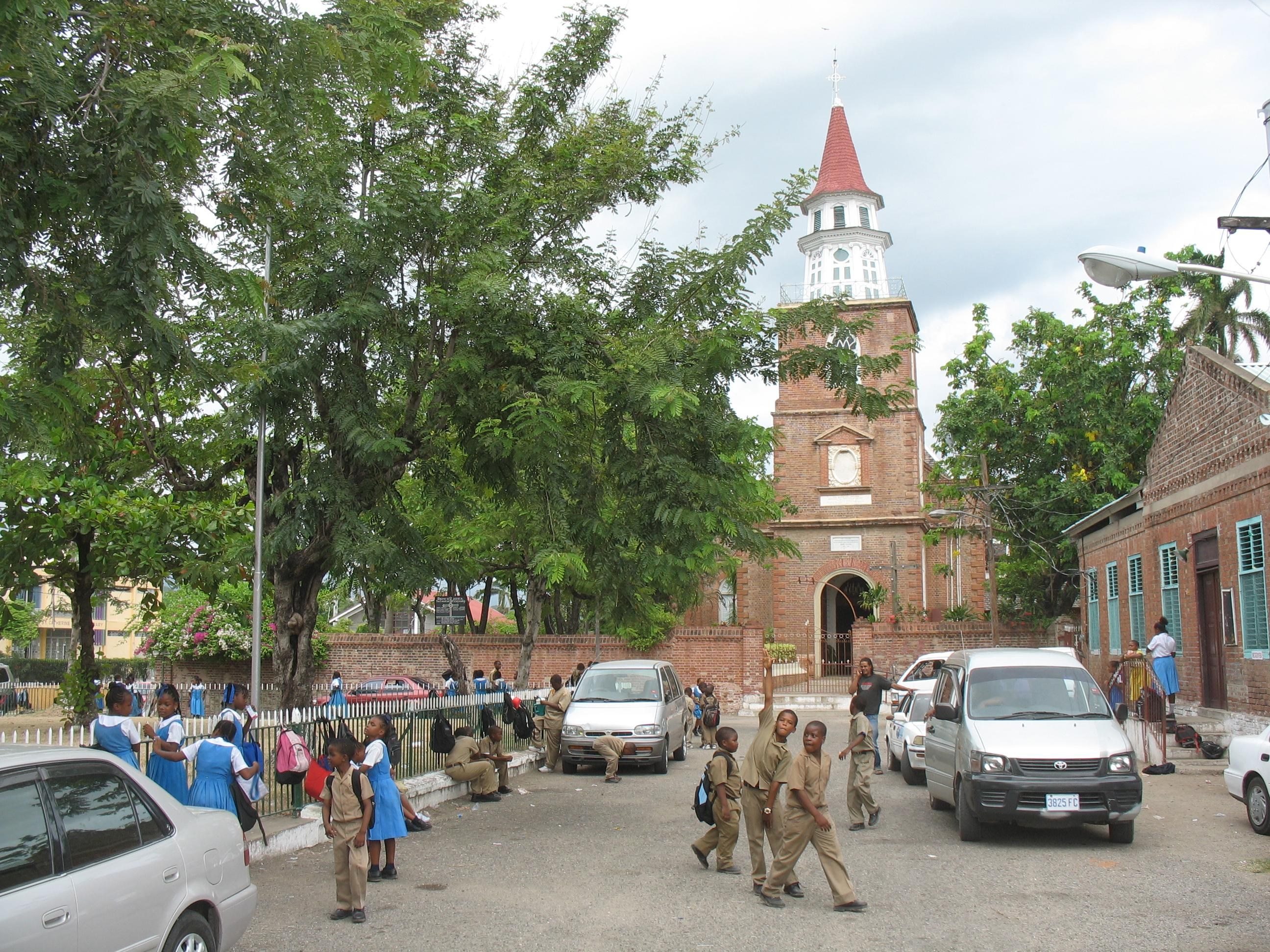
The Anglican St. Jago de la Vega Cathedral, Spanish Town, Jamaica.

Christianity was introduced by Spanish settlers who arrived in Jamaica in 1509. Thus, Roman Catholicism was the first Christian denomination to be established. Later, Protestant missions were very active, especially the Baptists, and played a key role in the abolition of slavery.

== Denominations ==
Christian denomination in Jamaica (2011 census)
Denomination	Population	%
All Church of God	689.868	25.71
Seventh day-Adventist	322.228	12.01
Pentecostal	295.195	11.00
Baptist	180.640	6.73
Anglican	74.891	2.79
Roman Catholic	57.946	2.16
United Church in Jamaica	55.360	2.06
Jehovah's Witnesses	50.849	1.90
Methodist	43.336	1.62
Brethren	23.647	0.88
Moravian	18.351	0.68
Total Christian	1.812.311	67.54

=== Anglicanism ===
Anglicanism was introduced by the British in 1664. The first church was built on the spot of the Spanish Church of the Red Cross in Spanish Town, and is the oldest Anglican cathedral outside the British Isles and the oldest place of continuous worship in the western hemisphere. By the early nineteenth century, abolitionism had propelled other denominations to the forefront, and threatened the established Anglican church. Thus, in 1824, the Diocese of Jamaica, which also included Belize and the Bahamas, was established. In 1861, the Bahamas became a separate diocese, and, in 1891, the same happened to Belize. During the 1960s, the Cayman Islands were added, and, in 2001, the diocese was renamed the Diocese of Jamaica & the Cayman Islands. Today, the diocese is part of the Church in the Province of the West Indies.

=== Baptist ===
In 1783 George Liele, a freed African who was once enslaved in America, introduced the Baptist denomination to Jamaica. Liele, born in Virginia became a Christian in Georgia, and then became the first African American to be ordained within the Baptist Church, at First Baptist Church Savannah. He later pastored both black and white Christians in the American South. On gaining his freedom he travelled to Jamaica and became the first 'unofficial' missionary - before Carey and before Judson. In Jamaica he first preached at the Race Course in Kingston, where people of all races came to hear him. He pioneered Baptist tradition in Jamaica, establishing the first Baptist Church - the Ethiopian Baptist Church. Despite having a church membership of over 450 enslaved Africans in 1791 and 3,000 by 1806, he together with his colleague George Baker began to correspond with the Baptist Missionary Society in England, as a means of developing the work in Jamaica, as it was under constant persecution from the Colonial Government and the established Anglican Church. At the forefront of standing up for the truth of the Gospel in pre-emancipation Jamaica, he died in 1828, but not before he had influenced many, such as the revolutionary Sam Sharpe and other Baptists involved in the 1831 'Baptist Wars' which proved to be the final death-knell for slavery. He also passed on the baton to Baptist missionaries from the UK - particularly his colleagues William Knibb and Thomas Burchell, who not only learned from him, but continued his work, and lived to see what he could only have hoped for - the abolition of slavery, the freeing of the enslaved, and the establishing of the then-largest mainline Christian denomination in Jamaica - the Baptist Church.

=== Methodists and Presbyterians ===
The Presbyterians and Methodists have made significant contributions to education.

=== Moravians ===
The Moravian Church was the first denomination that seriously undertook the teaching of Christianity to the slaves. In 1754 two wealthy plantation owners living in England invited the Moravians to send missionaries to their estates in Jamaica. They are still active today especially in the parishes of Manchester, Saint Elizabeth, and Westmoreland.

=== Roman Catholicism ===
Introduced by Spanish settlers in 1509, Peter Matyr ordered the building of the first church in Sevilla Nueva {now known as Saint Ann's Bay and was completed in 1526 a monastery was set up by the request of the Spanish king in an effort to convert Indigenous people. The effort to convert to the Indigenous people failed as they rapidly died from disease. In 1655, a Protestant English force captured Jamaica and Roman Catholicism was removed until 1837.

Today Jamaica is organized as the Archdiocese of Kingston in Jamaica, which also includes Belize and the Cayman Islands. Of the four suffragan dioceses, two, the dioceses of Mandeville and Montego Bay cover parts of Jamaica.

=== Seventh day Adventists ===
The story of the Seventh-day Adventists in Jamaica, is one of rapid growth and development over more than a century. In 1891, at the request of James Palmer of Kingston, the Tract Society (Seventh-day Adventist) in the United States of America mailed literature to Jamaica. He gave one to Mrs. Margaret Harrison who is said to be the first Adventist in Jamaica. Her plea to a General Conference session in Battle Creek, Michigan, resulted in the arrival of the first missionaries to the island, Pastor A J. Haysmer and his wife, on 26 May 1893.

The church was able to host a meeting of all workers in the West Indies from 5 to 15 November 1898 at Text Lane, in Kingston, Jamaica. By February 1899, there were six organized churches and 15 other congregations, with a total of 502 members and about 100 other Sabbath-keepers. The records show that by May 1902, this number had grown to 18 churches and 13 other congregations. At its 35th meeting in Oakland, California, in March 1903, the General Conference of Seventh-day Adventists voted to receive the Jamaica Conference into the fellowship. Rapid church growth followed although ordained ministers were few, but the lay members shouldered much of the work.

In the building of the Seventh-day Adventist denomination, education and health were essential planks. With the work growing in Jamaica, the need for an Adventist school to train new converts as ministers and church workers for the region became apparent. In 1906, suitable land was acquired at Bog walk and then Riversdale, St. Catherine, for this venture, and the West Indian Training School was established. Its policy of work-study helped students to work while studying in order to assist with the cost of their education. In 1919, the school was relocated to its present home in Mandeville and later became the West Indies College, now Northern Caribbean University (NCU), with enrollment averaging over 5,000. The Union has grown to cover evangelistic, health, education and youth programs, involving 10 high schools, 22 elementary schools and numerous basic schools, in addition to the ever-expanding NCU.

In 1912, the Adventists opened the “Massage and Hydropathic Treatment Rooms” in Kingston. As demand for its services grew, there were calls for a hospital, and in 1945, the “Andrews Memorial Hospital and Missionary Clinic” was established. Along with the facility, a nursing school was started. Throughout its history the expansive of the work of the Jamaica Union Conference has been underpinned by the publishing ministry, with its army of faithful 'colporteur' door to door book selling evangelists.

At the 1936 Adventist worldwide General Conference session, Elder A.C. Stockhousen was moved to report: "Jamaica is one of the largest conferences of Seventh-day Adventists in the world.... Today there are 5,335 baptized believers...A more loyal and serious band of believers it would be hard to find anywhere."

Today, this continues to be true, and there are currently 5 local conference organizations in Jamaica, but now with 324,747 members (as of 30 June 2020).

== Percentage of Jamaicans by religious affiliation ==
Religion in Jamaica (1991 and 2011 census)
Affiliation	1991	2001	2011
All Church of God	21.22	23.77	25.71
Seventh-day Adventist	9.05	10.84	12.01
Pentecostal	7.62	9.53	11.00
Baptist	8.83	7.27	6.73
Anglican	5.54	3.61	2.79
Roman Catholic	4.06	2.59	2.16
United Church	2.78	2.47	2.06
Methodism	2.71	1.93	1.62
Jehovah's Witnesses	1.67	1.70	1.90
Brethren	1.14	0.93	0.88
Moravian	1.20	0.81	0.68
Christian total	65.82	65.28	67.54
Revivalist			1.35
Rastafarianism		0.93	1.08
Hinduism		0.06	0.07
Islam		0.04	0.06
Judaism		0.01	0.02
Baha'ism		0.01	0.01
Other religion	8.60	9.77	6.30
Not religious	24.11	20.95	21.32
Not stated	1.47	2.78	2.25
TOTAL	100.00	100.00	100.00

== See also ==
- Protestantism in Jamaica
- United Church in Jamaica and the Cayman Islands
- United Sabbath-Day Adventist Church
