= Free Villages =

Free Village is the term used for Caribbean settlements, particularly in Jamaica, founded in the 1830s and 1840s with land for freedmen with independence of the control of plantation owners and other major estates. The concept was initiated by English Baptist missionaries in Jamaica, who raised funds in Great Britain to buy land to be granted to freedmen after emancipation. The planters had vowed not to sell any land to freedmen after slavery was finally abolished in the Empire in 1838; they wanted to retain freedmen as agricultural workers. The Free Villages were often founded around a Baptist church, and missionaries worked to found schools as well in these settlements.

== Pioneering the concept ==
Starting in the 1830s, in anticipation of emancipation from slavery, the Jamaican Baptist congregations, deacons and ministers pioneered the Caribbean concept of Free Villages with the English Quaker abolitionist Joseph Sturge. Many plantation owners and others in the landowning class made it clear they would never sell land to freed slaves, but provide only tied accommodation at the rents they chose. The aim of the estate owners was to prevent free labour choice such as movement between employers, and to keep labour costs low or negligible upon abolition of slavery. To circumvent this, the leaders of predominantly African-Caribbean Baptist chapels worked with their Baptist and Quaker contacts in England to arrange to buy land through land agents in London, in order to avoid detection. They would hold Jamaican land in order to establish Free Villages independent of estate owners.

For example, in 1835, using land agents and Baptist financiers in England, the African-Caribbean congregation of the Rev. James Phillippo (a British Baptist pastor and abolitionist in Jamaica) were able to discreetly purchase land, unbeknown to the plantation owners, in the hills of Saint Catherine parish. Under the scheme, the land became available to the freed slaves upon emancipation, by division into lots at not-for-profit rents, or for full ownership and title, where they could live free from their former masters' control. Phillippo's success in St. Catherine emboldened him; he founded a Free Village in Oracabessa later that same year.

== Jamaica's first Free Village ==
Henry Lunan, formerly an enslaved headman at Hampstead Estate, purchased the first plot in the very first Free Village or Baptist Free Village at Sligoville (in Saint Catherine parish and named after the Howe Browne, 2nd Marquess of Sligo, the Jamaican Governor at the time of abolition), ten miles north of Spanish Town. In 2007, a plaque was erected at Witter Park, Sligoville on 23 May, as a Labour Day event - to commemorate Jamaica's first Free Village.

Sturge Town was founded in 1838 as a Free Village and still survives. It is a small rural village about 10 miles from Brown's Town, Saint Ann Parish. The village is located on the northeast coast on the island of Jamaica. It is arguably the first free village in the Western Hemisphere but was registered second.

This village was named after Joseph Sturge (1793-May 1859), an English Quaker and abolitionist from Birmingham, England, who founded the British and Foreign Anti-Slavery Society (now Anti-Slavery International). He worked throughout his life in Radical political actions supporting pacifism, working-class rights, and the universal emancipation of slaves. He sponsored the purchase and settlement of Mt. Abyla, which was divided into village lots and sold to 100 families. One of those families was the Nugents, believed to be descendants of Gov. George Nugent and Lady Maria Nugent. Clarence Nugent married Lucetta Campbell, and they had five children, four girls and one son: Minetta, Cindella, Jean, Enid, and Oscar.

Clarence Nugent may be one of Governor George Nugent's grandsons. George Nugent, the 1st Baronet, became governor of Jamaica in April 1801. In 1797 he had married Maria Skinner, a daughter of Cortlandt Skinner, the Attorney-General of New Jersey, United States and a descendant of the Schuyler and Van Cortlandt families of British North America. Nugent and Maria had three sons and two daughters together. Lady Nugent wrote a journal of her experiences in Jamaica, which was first published in 1907.

After the enslaved Africans were emancipated in 1834, they helped established two churches in Sturge Town: Phillippo Baptist Church and New Testament Church of God.

== Other examples of Free Villages ==
There are many similar Free Villages in the Caribbean established through the work of Nonconformist chapels. In Jamaica, these include:

- Buxton (named after the abolitionist Englishman Sir Thomas Fowell Buxton) finance being raised through the process pioneered by Rev. John Clark's Baptist chapel, with the support of Joseph Sturge.
- Clarksonville (named after the abolitionist Englishman Thomas Clarkson); also arranged through the process pioneered by Rev. John Clark's Baptist chapel.
- Goodwill, on the border of Saint James parish, arranged through Rev. George Blyth, a minister of the Scottish Missionary Society and funded by his congregation. Unusual, in being established subject to a raft of local rules and regulations devised by Blyth, or established with his approval.
- Granville (named after the abolitionist Englishman Granville Sharp), in Trelawny, arranged through Rev. William Knibb's Baptist chapel.
- Kettering, (named after the birthplace of William Knibb).
- Maidstone, arranged through Moravian missionaries where, to this day, some of the inhabitants still bear the family names of the original settlers.
- Sandy Bay, a little seaside village on the way from Lucea to Montego Bay. Founded as a Free Village for emancipated slaves, it was a mid-1830s initiative of the congregation of the Baptist pastor Rev. Thomas Burchell, whose deacon was Sam Sharpe, executed in 1832 after the Baptist War slave rebellion until he died for the cause of abolition and freedom. Today the Free Village's playing field is named 'Burchell Field' after the missionary.
- Sligoville, the first free village in Jamaica
- Sturgeville or Sturge Town, eight miles from Brown's Town and named after the abolitionist Englishman, Joseph Sturge; also arranged as above.
- Trysee (the name is believed to derive from 'try and see'), an early Free Village in the Brown's Town area.

In the Bahamas:

- Adelaide
- Carmichael
- Gambier, settled by Elijah Morris

Although many of the Free Villages were named after a British man of widely accepted influence or importance, perhaps to help raise funds in England, the Jamaican Baptists and Joseph Sturge were Moral Radicals and Nonconformists rather than in the political mainstream.

One village was named after Anne Knight, a female Quaker abolitionist. Pickering and Tyrell said that naming was "a brave initiative that honoured women in an active, albeit gendered role as reformers at a time when custom frowned on their participation in the public world".

No Free Villages were named after the emerging African-Caribbean local leaders, although free Jamaicans became ordained as deacons in many of the Baptist chapels. They also conducted the schools and public services in chapels where there was no fully English-trained minister available. (For example, Henry Beckford served in this way at Staceyville before and after his visit to London in 1840).

== Conditions after abolition for freedmen estate workers ==
Although the concept of Free Villages proved an immediate success, and many were set up, their establishment depended partly upon success in raising money in England through the Baptists, the Quaker Joseph Sturge, and other Christian or abolitionist circles. For freedmen who continued to work on the plantation estates, conditions could sometimes be harsh. Some escaped to live as best they could in historically Maroon communities in the hills.

An English Baptist minister, arriving in Jamaica for the first time in 1841, described his surprise at the bleakness of the situation after emancipation:

Another circumstance, my dear sir, which has occasioned much surprise, is the frequency with which the most flagrant acts of oppression are practiced by the overseers. Within the last few days the tales of cruelty to which I have listened, have been numerous indeed; for the people, knowing how much advantage is taken of their ignorance, are sure to repair to their ministers for sympathy and advice. In some cases, where the wages have been withheld for months, the people are summoned for the rent of their dwellings which are upon the very property where they have been labouring. Last week from the mere caprice of the overseer, a family on one estate were ejected from their dwelling at a moment's notice, although their rent had been paid.

== Further reading and sources ==
- The Baptist Magazine, London: 1841
- Contested Sites: Commemoration, Memorial and Popular Politics in Nineteenth Century Britain, Paul A. Pickering & Alex Tyrell (editors), Ashgate Publishing: 2004, ISBN 0-7546-3229-6
