= Granville, Jamaica =

Granville
- Village
- Location within Jamaica
- Coordinates: 18°26′39″N 77°53′35″W
- Country: Jamaica
- Parish: St James
- First settled: 1845
- Founder: Rev. William Knibb

Granville is a small community in the parish of St. James on the island of Jamaica.

== History ==
Granville is named after Granville Sharp in 1845. Sligoville was said to be the first ‘free village’ to be established, and this was done by Rev. James Mursell Phillippo. William Knibb bought 90 acres here to create somewhere that ex-slaves could live if they were thrown off their previous owners land. The 90 acres had been a farm known as Grumble Pen. Knibb also hoped to grow the congregation of Falmouth Baptist Church.

What became known as ‘The Free Village System’ resulted from the first named Sligoville, and similar villages were established throughout the island, most of them by ministers of religion, who supplied land to the ex-slaves.

Knibb died in 1845 and became a Jamaican hero. The village of Granville was looked after by his widow Mary Knibb and a Sargeant Wallace. Some of the people still living there have deeds signed by Mary Knibb which show that they have a legal entitlement to their land. However this is not always the case. The village has a primary and infant school, a church, and a postal agency. The school was rebuilt in 1953 after the previous one was lost in a hurricane in 1951.
