= Kettering (disambiguation) =

Kettering is a town in Northamptonshire, England.

Kettering may also refer to:

== Places ==
- Kettering, Tasmania, a coastal town in Australia
- Kettering, Jamaica, a former Free Village
- Kettering, Maryland, an incorporated area in Maryland, United States
- Kettering, Ohio, a city in Montgomery County, Ohio, United States
- Borough of Kettering, a former district of Northamptonshire, England that contained the town
  - Kettering (UK Parliament constituency)

== Other uses ==
- Kettering College in Kettering, Ohio
- Kettering University in Flint, Michigan
- Kettering Tower, a high-rise building in Dayton, Ohio
- Kettering Town F.C.
- Kettering Rugby Football Club
- "Kettering", a 2009 song by the Antlers from Hospice

== People with the surname ==
- Charles F. Kettering, American inventor
- Steve Kettering, American politician

== See also ==
- Kettering Medical Center, Kettering, Ohio
- Memorial Sloan-Kettering Cancer Center, New York City
- Catering
