= Nathaniel Rogers (physician) =

British physician

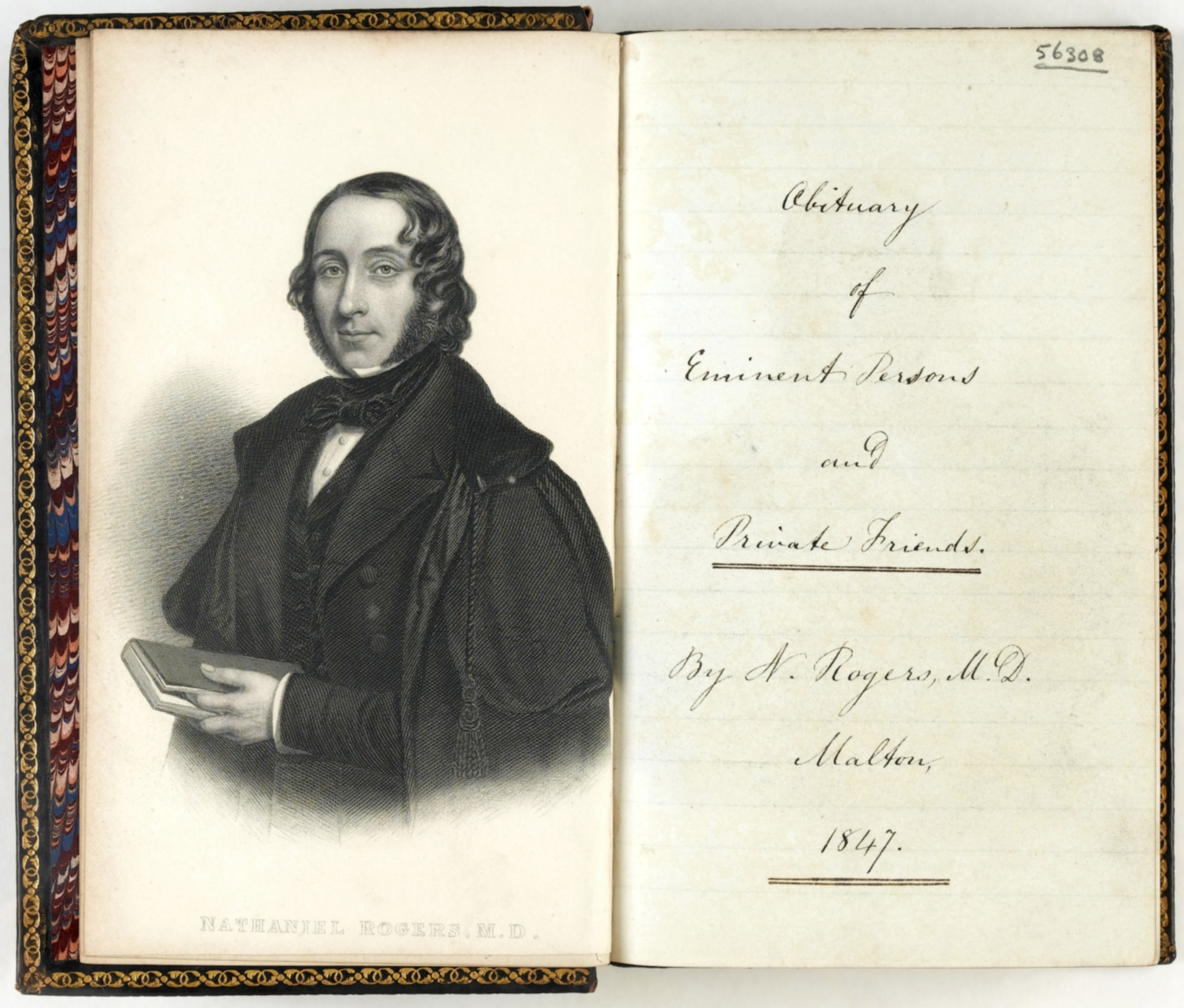
Portrait of Nathaniel Rogers in volume 2 (1847) of his book Obituary of eminent persons and private friends

Nathaniel Rogers M.D. (1808 – 27 October 1884) was a doctor of medicine who qualified at Edinburgh University in 1832 and practiced in Malton, Yorkshire in his early career, later moving to London and then, during semi-retirement spent his winter seasons at Exeter. He is known more widely as the donor of stained glass windows to both Anglican churches and nonconformist chapels. He edited several medical books, authored poems and letters to newspapers, chaired baptist and related meetings, and gave lectures to Mechanics' Institutes and similar educational institutes in London and North Yorkshire.

One of Dr Rogers' most sought-after public lectures in the late 1830s was a two-evening lecture on Mythology of the Ancients. This was given at the Southwark Literary Society, the Finsbury Institution for Sunday School Teachers and Senior Scholars, the Croydon Literary and Scientific Institution, the Scarborough Mechanics Institute, and the Stepney Meeting Sabbath Sunday School Institute.

Nathaniel Rogers' first wife was Alice Dixon, daughter of the wealthy Charles Dixon; he married again in 1856 to Alice Casterton, widow of Henry Burnstead and daughter of William Casterton of Dalston.

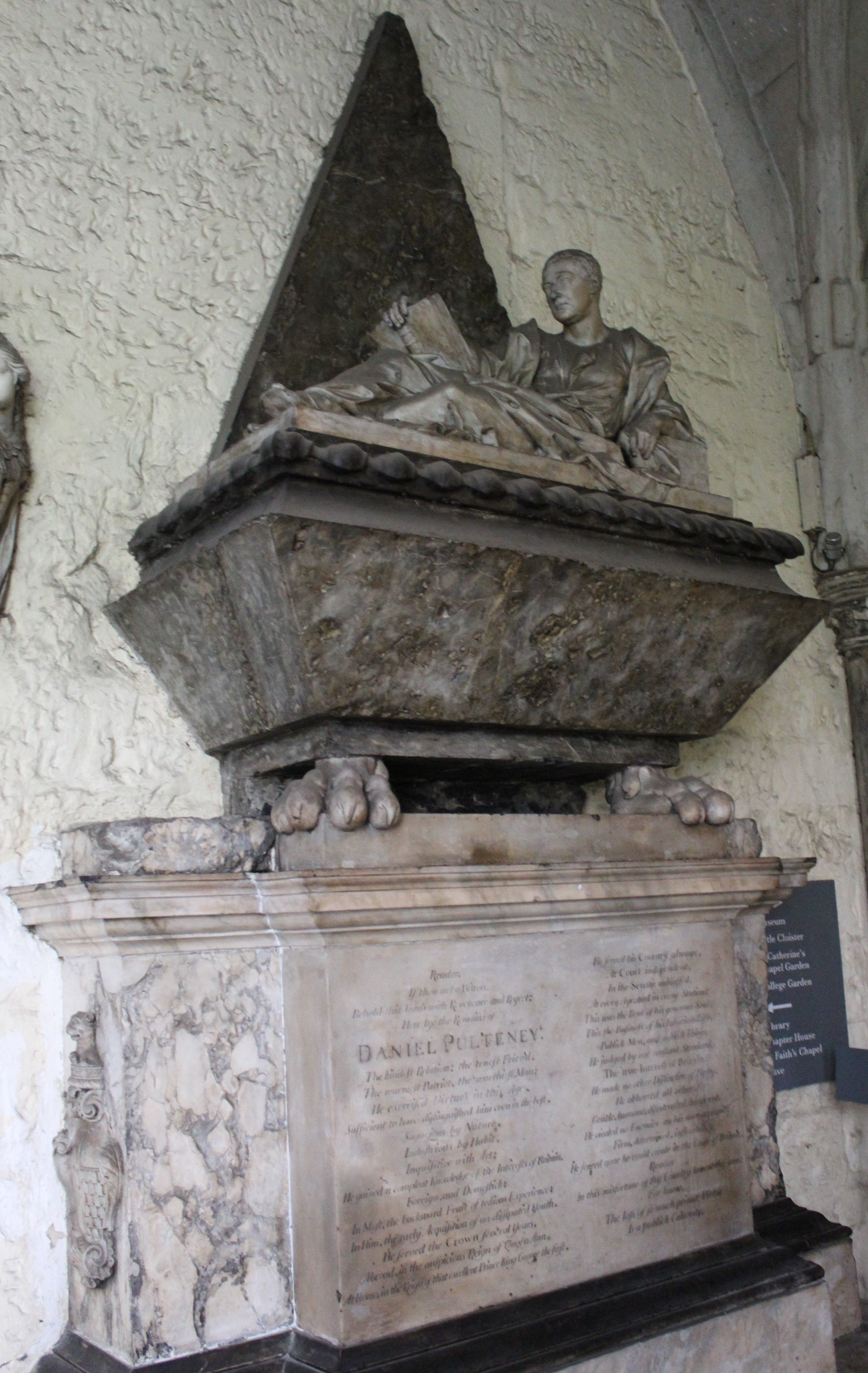
Monument to Daniel Pulteney at Westminster Abbey, completed and unveiled in 1732, a year after Pulteney's death. Later repaired through donations made by Rogers sometime between the years 1858 and 1866—the time which he resided in Westminster.

Amongst his philanthropic works were donations made to restore the Pulteney Monument at Westminster Abbey, an ornate effigy consisting of varied styles of marble, honoring politician Daniel Pulteney, as well as the donations of several stained glass windows at St. Paul's Cathedral, Abney Park Chapel, Union Chapel, Islington, and Acton Parish church, London.

One of the Canons at St. Paul's described Rogers' donated window with considerable praise: there is a glorious light, as if shining in from the heavens. The two angels are standing as if midway between heaven and earth; and the disciples are standing in different attitudes below, gazing upwards. To my mind it surpasses all that have yet been taken up. The stained glass window, given by Dr Rogers, was made by a Munich firm. It was placed at the east end of St. Paul's Cathedral. Nathaniel Rogers' window at Acton Parish Church was also well received, being described at the time as a beautiful stained glass window... in the south side of the parish church. Unlike the window at St. Paul's, this was, however, a family tribute. It was donated in memory of his father and mother who had married in the church. The window represented 'Charity', its text reading Charity believeth all things, hopeth all things, and endureth all things.

Rogers was, by faith, a Baptist, supporting their meetings and involvement in the non-denominational London Missionary Society. As missionaries, the Baptists were particularly strong in Jamaica. Shortly after the death of William Knibb he was invited to chair a meeting of the Malton Sunday School Baptists, when his support for Knibb and his Anti-slavery work became plain: We sympathise especially with our sable brethren in Jamaica; for great has been the loss in losing Knibb. To say that he was perfect would be to flatter humanity at the expense of truth... for perfection belongs not on earth but in heaven.

Throughout his life, Nathaniel Rogers was interested in his family history, believing himself to be descended in some way from the Protestant martyr of the same name, John Rogers. Though he claimed such descent, it is unclear whether he uncovered any evidence. However, he funded the restoration of more recent ancestral memorials, such as to James Rogers of Dagenham, born in 1741.

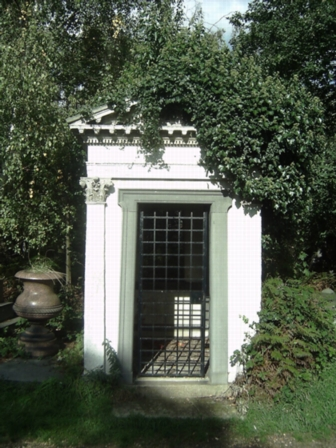
Listed Mausoleum to the Rogers Family at Abney Park Cemetery, London

Rogers died in 1884 in Exmouth, aged 76. Twenty years before his death, he designed a small white marble temple of the Corinthian order with pedimented stone roof, at Abney Park Cemetery in Stoke Newington. Dr Rogers's Family Tomb it proclaimed, in an inscription over the iron grilled entrance gate. This was the only mausoleum ever permitted by the largely Congregational Board of the non-denominational cemetery, given their distinctly Puritan leanings against any such grandeur in death in their garden cemetery and stood on the principal axis between the Abney Park Chapel and historic gated entrance to Abney Park. Its paired windows were carefully positioned to permit the original axial vista to co-exist with the mausoleum, by way of a small north-south 'through-view'. The Rogers' mausoleum is now grade II listed by English Heritage. It is the resting place of Rev. Samuel Oughton and his wife, the Baptist pastor, missionary and reformer, as well as a number of other Rogers' family members.

== Publications ==
- Nathaniel Rogers (1826–1869) Obituary of eminent persons and private friends, Vol. 1 (1826), Vol.2 (1847)
