= Silver Bluff Baptist Church =

Historical place

Coordinates: 33.4101398°N 81.8926142°W

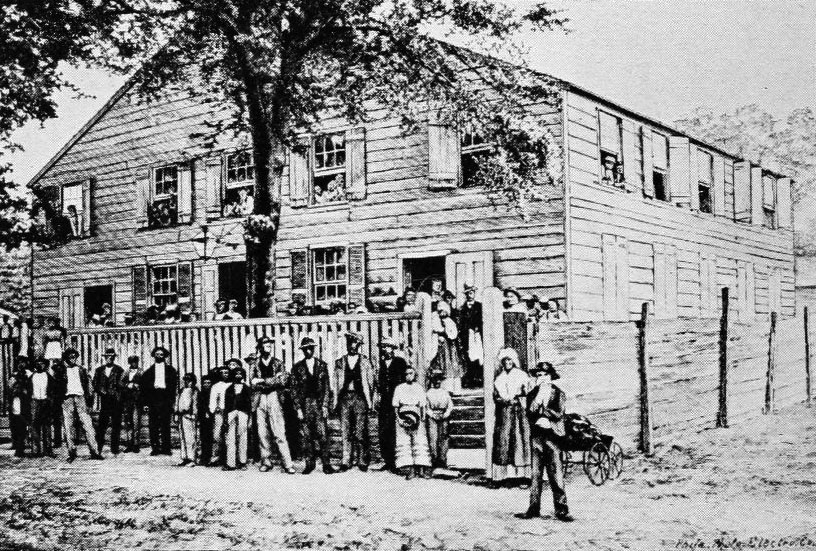
Silver Bluff Baptist Church was founded in the 1770s and is one of the first black churches in America.

The Silver Bluff Baptist Church was founded between 1773 and 1775 in Beech Island, South Carolina, by several enslaved African Americans who organized under elder David George.

The historian Albert Raboteau has identified it as the first separate black congregation in the nation, although others contend for that distinction, including the First Baptist Church in Petersburg, Virginia. After the British captured Savannah in 1778 during the American Revolutionary War, George and his congregation of 30 slaves went to that city, seeking freedom, which the British had promised to slaves who escaped from rebel masters. Those church members who stayed in Savannah after the end of the American Revolutionary War evolved as the First African Baptist Church.

George was highly influential in the early black Baptist movement. Resettling by the British with his family and other Black Loyalists in Nova Scotia, he founded a congregation there. George and his family chose to migrate to Freetown, Sierra Leone in 1792, when the British founded this new colony in West Africa. He founded a congregation and Baptist church there as well.

== History ==
In the Great Awakening, northern Baptist and Methodist preachers traveled around the South, converting whites and enslaved and free blacks. The Baptists especially offered roles in congregations and churches to blacks, and some men were licensed as preachers and elders.

The founders of Silver Bluff Baptist Church were enslaved African Americans who were converted by the preaching of a white Baptist minister named Wait Palmer, and perhaps a slave preacher named George Leile. There were eight founders: David George and his wife; Jesse Peter (also known as Jesse Galphin); and five others. Palmer was so impressed by George's preaching that he appointed him as elder of the group. They brought in other members and started meeting about 1774–1775 at Galphin's Mill, owned by George's master George Galphin.

When the British in 1778 occupied Savannah across the river, the church was disrupted. George Galphin was a Patriot and moved away from his plantation. David George and the 30 enslaved members of Silver Bluff Baptist Church went to Savannah to seek promised freedom behind the British lines. They joined with preacher George Leile and his group there.

Along with thousands of other freed slaves, David George and his family evacuated with the British in 1782 after the end of the war. The Crown fulfilled its promise and transported them to freedom in Nova Scotia. George preached in Shelburne and planted another Baptist congregation. George Leile went to Jamaica with the British, where he founded a Baptist church in Kingston.

In 1792 the George family migrated from Nova Scotia to the new colony of Sierra Leone, assisted by British abolitionists. David George was one of the founders of Freetown and its first Baptist church.

Andrew Bryan, converted in 1782, was the only one of the three earliest black Baptist preachers in Georgia to stay in Savannah. He later purchased his freedom and that of his wife. He continued preaching and converting, and in 1788 organized the First African Baptist Church of Savannah. In 1793 he bought land for a structure, which the congregation built in 1794. The church grew to have more than 400 members before Bryan's death.

After the war in 1783, Jesse Peter Galphin (the name he took after he gained his freedom) led other Baptist congregants from the Silver Bluff congregation to Augusta, Georgia. They founded the first African Baptist church of that city. It later was known as Springfield Baptist Church. Because Jesse Peter Galphin was linked to the original Silver Bluff congregation, in 1922 the historian Walter Brooks identified Springfield Baptist Church (as they were then known in Augusta) as the oldest black Baptist church in the nation.

== See also ==
- List of African-American firsts
