= George Oughton =

South Australian musician

George Oughton (20 February 1842 – 12 September 1898) was a musician and bandleader in South Australia, remembered as the Adelaide Town Hall's first organist.

== History ==
Oughton was born in Jamaica, the youngest son of Rev. Samuel Oughton, whose daughter Lavinia married E. Paxton Hood. When young he returned with his parents to England, where he went to school conducted by Professor Newth in Oundle, Northamptonshire, and in addition to the usual subjects he studied music, for which he had shown an early aptitude. For some time he was studied with Ebenezer Prout, to whom he was distantly related. In 1859 he sailed for Melbourne, where he received special instruction in band work from bandmaster Johnson, of the 40th Regiment, and sailed with the regiment to New Zealand, where he served for five years, and was present at several battles in what was then known as the Maori Wars. He then went into business in Auckland, and entered into the musical life of that city.

In August 1870 he left New Zealand for Adelaide, South Australia, and was soon appointed organist and choirmaster at St. Paul's Church, Pulteney Street, Adelaide, at that time the principal Anglican place of worship. He opened the new organ at Christ Church, Kapunda in 1873.

He became associated with the Unitarian congregation at a social meeting at White's Rooms in July 1875, and in December 1876 was appointed their organist while it was being constructed. He opened the new Wolff organ on 13 April 1877, nearly 20 years after the first sermon by the Rev. J. C. Woods in the new church. He remained with the church until 1881.

He founded the Adelaide Amateur Musical Union as an orchestra in 1872 and was its conductor until 1879, succeeded by W. R. Pybus. The group disbanded in 1881 when the Philharmonic Society was revived under Pybus.

He was, as Lieutenant Oughton, bandmaster of Adelaide's Volunteer Militia/ Adelaide Military Band, which made its first public appearance with him as conductor, at the Town Hall in July 1878, and regularly played at the rotunda (still standing) in Elder Park. He brought the band to such a level of competence that when he took the band to Melbourne in November 1886 it was recognised as possibly the best in Australia.

He served, in a voluntary capacity, in charge of the Town Hall organ as City Organist from 1879 to 1885, succeeded by T. H. Jones.

For much of the time in South Australia he was employed by the Public Service, perhaps as a statistician.

Around December 1886 he resigned from the Militia Band, and left South Australia for New South Wales, where he was employed by their Public Service. He returned to Adelaide suffering ill health and paralysed in 1895, and lived bed-bound with his daughter and son-in-law in Flinders Street, where he died.

== Family ==
George Oughton was married to Jane Amelia Oughton (c. 1843 – 22 August 1903), perhaps née Dove. She was a niece of Judge Conroy.

- George Oughton ( – c. 28 April 1935) moved to Fremantle, Western Australia. He was involved with the Block 45 gold mining syndicate.
- (Neta) Hannah Stanley Oughton (c. 1872 – 13 June 1933) also spent her adult life in Western Australia. She married the "clever artist" (Fosse) Bolton Hackett (c. 1865 – 21 October 1891) on 27 February 1886 then prospector Patrick Robert Whalan (c. 1858 – 16 January 1909) in 1895. She married one more time, to the WA Labor politician George Taylor (1861 – 24 September 1935) on 12 December 1910. She was made Justice of the Peace in 1920.
- Lavinia "Lavie" Oughton (c. 1867 – ) married ventriloquist and sharebroker Edward D. Davies (c. 1821 – 20 April 1896) on 14 November 1894, lived at Flinders Street, Adelaide. She was 27; he was a 63 year old widower, killed himself at Esperance, Western Australia.
