= William Knibb Memorial High School =

School in Trelawny Parish, Jamaica

Coordinates: 18.4745°N 77.6627°W

William Knibb Memorial High School is a high school in Trelawny Parish, Jamaica. It is named after William Knibb, a 19th-century English missionary.

== History ==
The school was founded in 1961.

== Notable alumni ==
- Marvin Anderson, sprinter
- Usain Bolt, widely considered to be the greatest sprinter of all time
- Lerone Clarke, sprinter
- Michael Green, sprinter
