= George Liele =

African American baptist minister and missionary

George Liele (also spelled Lisle or Leile, c. 1750–1820) was an African American and emancipated slave who became the founding pastor of First Bryan Baptist Church and First African Baptist Church, in Savannah, Georgia (USA). He later would become a missionary to Jamaica.

Liele was born into slavery in Virginia in 1752, but was taken to Georgia. As an adult he was converted by Rev. Matthew Moore of Burke County, Georgia, in 1773, and continued to worship in this white church for four years until Savannah was evacuated by forces loyal to Britain. His master Henry Sharp was a deacon in Rev. Moore's church and encouraged him in his preaching to other slaves. Liele was freed by Sharp, also a Baptist and loyalist, before the American Revolution began. Sharp died in battle as a Tory major on March 1, 1779. Liele then went to Savannah, Georgia, where he helped organize an early Baptist congregation. He later would become one of the first Baptist Missionaries, serving in Jamaica, and founding the Ethiopian Baptist Church of Jamaica. He is known for writing the Church covenant of the Ethiopian Baptists, which became internationally recognized by Baptists for its importance.

== First African Baptist Church Founding ==
Liele was licensed to preach by Baptists in Georgia in 1773, the first African American to be so. Two hundred and twenty two years later his great great granddaughter The Reverend Dr. A. Louise Bonaparte become a licensed Baptist Minister and become the seventh generation in their family to do so.

He played a major role in the founding of the church by converting its first members. After being freed by Sharp, Liele converted and baptized many slaves outside the Savannah area. One of the converts was David George, who was one of the eight original members of Silver Bluff Baptist Church in Aiken, South Carolina. During the Revolutionary War, Leile traveled to Savannah, where escaped slaves were given protection by the British Army who were occupying the city. Liele's preaching helped to convert many believers there, including Andrew Bryan, who became a leader of the congregation and sometimes preached as well. In 1782, the British evacuated the slaves, mostly to Nova Scotia. However, Liele traveled to Jamaica. Later, Bryan would help found and pastor the First African Baptist Church, originally largely made up of converts that Liele helped lead to Christ.

== Evacuation ==
Liele chose to leave with the British to ensure his freedom rather than risk reenslavement in the American South. He migrated to Jamaica, then a British colony and slave society, with his wife Hannah and their four children. He preached at the racecourse at Kingston, the capital, where the novelty of a black itinerant ex-slave preacher attracted considerable attention. Liele was soon able to gather a congregation and purchase a piece of land about a mile from Kingston, where he gradually built a chapel.

== Ministry in Jamaica ==
To support his work, and expand it, Liele sought support from London. He was helped in this endeavour by Moses Baker, an Afro-European barber who arrived in Jamaica from the United States in 1783. He converted to Christianity and was baptised by Liele. A Quaker invited Baker to live on his estate and instruct the slaves in 'religious and moral principles'. To expand this educational work, Moses Baker approached benefactors in Britain. He made contact with the Baptist John Ryland, who became interested in securing funds from British donors to meet such demand for missionary work. He was moved to help instigate the non-denominational London Missionary Society to help provide for this.

Ryland's first missionary was funded by the Baptists rather than the London Missionary Society. His achievements were limited since he died early. Later, in the early 19th century, a trio of Baptist missionaries from Britain, Thomas Burchell, James Phillippo and William Knibb, and slightly later still others such as Samuel Oughton, were more successful in supporting local African Baptist congregations and helping them develop their international links. They met fierce resistance from the White Jamaican planter class and slave owners who had great influence in the House of Assembly of Jamaica and had provided adequately for their own spiritual needs with the Anglican Church. They opposed both education and the congregational governance ideas of the Baptists from being introduced among their slaves.

In 1792 Liele penned the church covenant, which served a dual purpose for the Ethiopian Baptists of Jamaica. First, it was a shared teaching tool, to instruct Baptists about commonly shared principles from the Scriptures; secondly, it gave great comfort to slave-holders; ensuring that their slaves would be law abiding. The church covenant was shown to members of the legislature, the magistrates and justices to secure their approval that they might give their slaves permission to become members of the congregation.
