= Shirley Anne Tate =

Jamaican sociologist, scholar and professor

- Born: 1956 (age 69–70); Spanish Town, Saint Catherine Parish, Jamaica
- Education: University of York, Lancaster University
- Known for: Sociologist, scholar, professor, author, researcher

Shirley Anne Tate (born March 1956) is a Jamaican sociologist, scholar, researcher, educator, and author. She is known for her work in studying racism, the Black diaspora and the intersection with feminism; specifically within institutional racism, mixed race studies, and Black identity.

Tate holds the Canada Research Chair in Feminism and Intersectionality in the Sociology Department of the University of Alberta, starting in 2019. She has additionally taught at Leeds Beckett University, from 2017 to 2019, and at the University of Leeds, from 2012 to 2017.

== Biography ==
Tate was born in March 1956 in Spanish Town and was raised in Sligoville, Saint Catherine Parish, Jamaica. She received a PhD in sociology from Lancaster University in 2000; and had studied at University of York where she received a M.A. degree in linguistics and M.Phil. degree in communication studies.

Tate is an Honorary Professor, chair in Critical Studies in Higher Education Transformation at Nelson Mandela University.

== Publications ==
This list is of select publications by Tate.

=== Articles ===
- Tate, Shirley (2 February 2007). "Black Beauty: Shade, Hair and Anti-Racist Aesthetics – Feminism and Postcolonialism". Ethnic and Racial Studies (2): 300–319. doi:10.1080/01419870601143992. S2CID 143438593 – via Taylor and Francis Online.
- Tate, Shirley Anne; Bagguley, Paul (26 December 2016). "Building The Anti-Racist University: Next Steps". Race Ethnicity and Education. 20 (3): 289–299. doi:10.1080/13613324.2016.1260227. S2CID 152110928.
- Tate, Shirley Anne; Page, Damien (1 February 2018). "Whiteliness and Institutional Racism: Hiding Behind (Un)conscious Bias – Critical Philosophy of Race and Education". Ethics and Education (1): 141–155. doi:10.1080/17449642.2018.1428718. hdl:2436/624335. S2CID 149361100 – via Taylor and Francis Online.

=== Books ===
- Tate, Shirley Anne (2009). Black Beauty: Aesthetics, Stylization, Politics. Surrey, UK: Ashgate Publishing. ISBN 9780754671459.
- Tate, Shirley Anne (2015). Black Women's Bodies and The Nation, Race, Gender and Culture. Genders and Sexualities in the Social Sciences. London, UK: Palgrave Macmillan. doi:10.1057/9781137355287 (inactive 12 July 2025). ISBN 978-1-137-35527-0.
- Tate, Shirley Anne (2017). Black Skins, Black Masks: Hybridity, Dialogism, Performativity. New York City: Routledge, Taylor & Francis. ISBN 9781351955256.
- Gabriel, Deborah; Tate, Shirley Anne (2017). Inside the Ivory Tower: Narratives of Women of Colour Surviving and Thriving in British Academia. London, UK: Trentham Books. ISBN 978-1-8585-6848-5.
