= Phillippo Baptist Church =

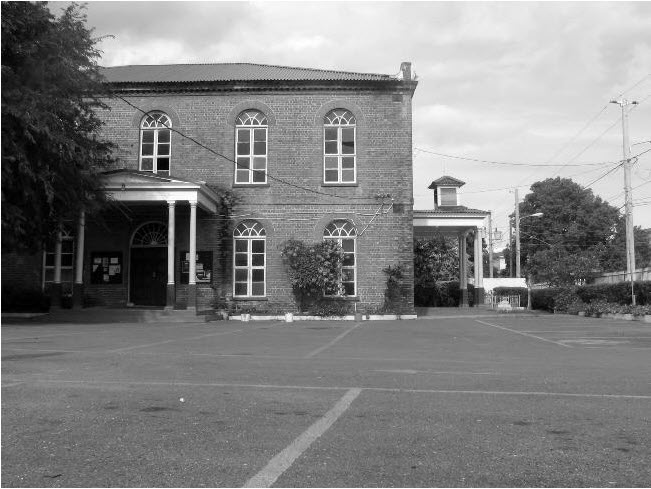
- Phillippo Baptist Church

- Location within Jamaica
- 17.9980°N 76.9584°W
- Location: Spanish Town
- Country: Jamaica
- Denomination: Baptist

History
- Status: Church
- Founded: 1827
- Founder: James Phillippo

Architecture
- Functional status: Active

Phillippo Baptist Church is a Baptist church in Spanish Town, Jamaica.

== History ==
Rev. Phllippo built the church in 1827 to replace an earlier one which he had built which was burned to the ground by plantation owners (planters), who were vehemently opposed to the preaching of religion to slaves. It is named after its founder and first minister, Reverend James Phillippo, a Baptist missionary who arrived in Jamaica in 1823. He campaigned for the abolition of slavery and for the establishment of "Free Villages" for emancipated slaves.

Also located on the church grounds, is a stone slab which marks where some of the shackles of slavery are buried. The slab is inscribed to commemorate the 150th anniversary of the church.

The church was damaged during Hurricane Dean in 2007, which ripped the roof off the building, and required $25m ($300,000 USD) in repairs. The church was closed for 20 months and underwent significant restoration and renovations, and was reopened in June, 2009. At the official reopening ceremonies of the church, Prime Minister Bruce Golding's representative (Olivia Grange, then culture minister) said that "Phillippo Baptist Church represents a great part of the nation's history, therefore, we need for all to be aware of the pride and joy it gives to see the restoration done. James Phillippo was even denied permission to preach to slaves several times, but this did not stop him from setting up the church". Golding's representative also noted that the church played a major role in the fight for and the abolition of slavery, and that even by today's standards is still an impressive architectural creation.
