= First African Baptist Church (Savannah, Georgia) =

Historic church in Georgia, United States

- First Colored Church (formerly)
- Front view
- First African Baptist Church
- Location: 23 Montgomery Street; Franklin Square; Savannah, Georgia
- Country: United States
- Denomination: Baptist
- Website: www.theoldestblackchurch.org

History
- Founded: 1777
- Founder: George Leile

Architecture
- Years built: 1859

Administration
- Division: National Baptist Convention, U. S. A. Inc.

Clergy
- Pastor: Thurmond Neill Tillman
- First African Baptist Church
- U.S. National Historic Landmark District – Contributing property
- Part of: Savannah Historic District (ID66000277)
- Added to NRHP: November 13, 1966

First African Baptist Church, located in Savannah, Georgia, claims to be derived from the first black Baptist congregation in North America. While it was not officially organized until 1788, it grew from members who founded a congregation in 1773. Its claim of "first" is contested by the Silver Bluff Baptist Church, Aiken County, South Carolina (1773), and the First Baptist Church of Petersburg, Virginia, whose congregation officially organized in 1774.

First African Baptist Church operates a museum which displays memorabilia dating back to the 18th century.

== History ==
George Leile, a slave who in 1773 was the first African American licensed by the Baptists to preach in Georgia, played a part in the founding of the Savannah church by converting some of its early members. His initial licensing as a Baptist was to preach to slaves on plantations along the Savannah River, in Georgia and South Carolina.

Leile's master, a Baptist deacon, had freed him before the American Revolutionary War. Over the next few years, Leile converted and baptized slaves in the area. These included David George, one of eight slaves who were baptized and formed a congregation called the Silver Bluff Baptist Church in Aiken County, South Carolina, across the river from Augusta. George was appointed an elder and preacher, and attracted nearly 30 members over the next few years.

After the Revolutionary War started, in 1778 Leile made his way to the British-occupied city of Savannah, to ensure his security behind British lines. The British had offered freedom to slaves who escaped their rebel masters. After the British occupied Savannah, the Patriot master of David George and his followers fled to another area. All the members of the Silver Bluff church went to the city to go behind British lines for freedom. They joined with some of Leile's group. Others were converted by Leile's preaching, including Andrew Bryan and his wife Hannah in 1782. Bryan became a preacher and leader in the congregation.

In 1782 hundreds of blacks were evacuated from Savannah by the British, who transported many to Nova Scotia and other colonies, and some to London. Leile and his family sailed with the British for freedom to Jamaica. David George and his family went with Loyalists to Nova Scotia. Both founded Baptist congregations in their new locations. Later George and his family migrated to Sierra Leone, where he planted another Baptist church.

Bryan, who had purchased his and his wife's freedom, was the only one of the three early black Baptist preachers in the colonies to stay in Savannah and the new United States. He continued to preach and organize other slaves in the Savannah area despite persecution from local Episcopal authorities. He called people together as the church's first pastor.

Bryan led the First African Baptist Church to official recognition with 67 members on January 20, 1788, at their regular meeting place of Brampton's barn, approximately three miles west of Savannah. They were recognized by Rev. Abraham Marshall (a European-American minister) and his free black assistant Jesse Peter (who took the name Jesse Galphin). Galphin was also one of the founders of the Silver Bluff Baptist Church. Marshall examined and baptized members that day.

In 1794 the congregation built a frame structure on land Bryan had purchased the year before. They called the church Bryan Street African Baptist Church. Bryan lived to see the church grow to over 400 members. His brother Sampson, who assisted him, remained a slave. In 1800 the congregation had grown to 700. By 1802, Bryan Street renamed itself First African Baptist Church, and two other black congregations were founded: Second African Baptist Church and the Ogeechee (Third) Baptist Church.

In 1815, Andrew C. Marshall, Bryan's nephew, became pastor of First African Baptist. In 1822, the First Colored Baptist Church and the Second Colored Baptist Church recombined and became the First African Baptist Church. The church organized the first Sunday School for African Americans (endorsed by the Independent Presbyterian Church) on July 26, 1826.

By 1830 under Marshall, the congregation of First African Baptist Church had grown to 2,417 members. In 1832, the congregation had a serious split over doctrinal issues that took years to resolve. Some members felt that Marshall was too taken by the new ideas of Rev. Alexander Campbell. Marshall and more than 2,600 members left to found a congregation that kept the name of First African Baptist. They purchased a building to use a Franklin Square that had belonged to the First Baptist Church.

In the 1850s, they constructed a new sanctuary facility across from Franklin Square. It has since been continuously occupied by First African Baptist.

The congregation at Bryan Street, numbering fewer than 200, kept the facility built under Andrew Bryan and took the name Third Baptist Church. Later they renamed it First Bryan Baptist Church.

As the Georgia Baptist association grew, there was competition among congregations to claim lines to founding core members and be declared the first church in the state. In 1888 at the Georgia Convention, claims were examined as to primacy of First African Baptist of Savannah and the First Bryan Baptist Church. The convention declared that First African Baptist of Savannah was the banner church, due largely to Marshall's leadership during the difficult years of the 1830s, which held his congregation together under the name of the original church.

=== The Civil War and the Underground Railroad ===
The holes in the sanctuary flooring form a design meant to look like a tribal symbol. These were air holes for escaped slaves who would hide in the church, interpreted as in the pattern of a Kongo cosmogram, which served as a stop on the Underground Railroad (UGR). During the Civil War, the church housed runaway slaves in a 4-foot (1.2 m) space beneath the sanctuary floorboards. The 9-squared ceiling showed that the church was part of the UGR.

=== Civil Rights Movement ===
Participants in the early Civil Rights Movement in Savannah held weekly meetings at the church.

=== Pastors ===
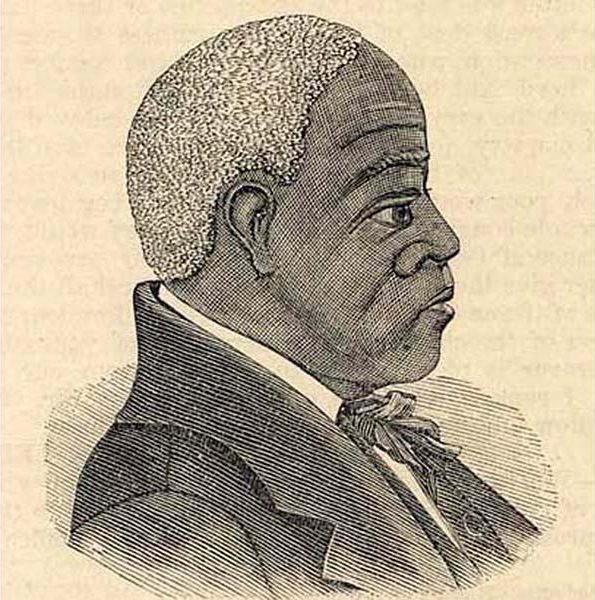
Andrew Bryan Pastor of First African from 1788-1812

- George Leile (1778–1787)
- Andrew Bryan (1788–1812)
- Andrew Cox Marshall (1812–1856)
- William J. Campbell (1857–1877)
- George Gibbons (1878–1884)
- Emanuel King Love (1885–1900)
- Sennica J. Thornton (1901–1907)
- Lamonta M. Williams (1909–1913)
- Malachi J. Williams (1915–1922)
- Edgar Garfield Thomas (1924–1928)
- Mack T. Walton(1929–1931)
- J. Alfred Wilson (1931–1939)
- Ralph Mark Gilbert (1939–1956)
- Curtis J. Jackson (1957–1961)
- William F. Stokes II (1963–1973)
- Lawrence McKinney (1973–1980)
- Thurmond N. Tillman (1982–present)

== The facility ==
The current sanctuary is located in the historic area of Savannah at the corner of West Bryan and Montgomery streets, across from Franklin Square. It was built in the 1850s (completed in 1859) by both free African Americans and slaves. The builders made the bricks and built the church after the slaves had labored in the fields. The church was the first building constructed of brick to be owned by African Americans in the state of Georgia. It is listed in the National Register of Historic Places as a contributing property of the Savannah Historic District.

The upstairs balcony contains some of the original pews were made by the slaves. The pews are carved with West African Arabic script. The stained-glass windows in the building date to 1885 and depict African-American subjects.

The original bell tower of the church was destroyed by a hurricane in the early 20th century.

== The museum ==
The church museum contains archives and memorabilia that date back to the 18th century, including memorabilia dating to the congregation's beginning in 1773. It also houses pictures of the church's seventeen pastors, written records (from the 1800s to present), communion sets dating to 1814, and newspaper articles (from 1861 showing the dedication of the facility). Handmade quilts are also on display, with the history behind the designs.

The museum is open to visitors daily during normal hours of operation (10:00 a.m. - 4:00 p.m. Monday through Friday) and by appointment at other times. Guests are given guided tours through the church facility and the museum. The church began offering tours to the public in the early 1970s. An estimated 20,000 to 25,000 visitors tour the facility each year.

== Affiliations ==
The church is affiliated with the National Baptist Convention, USA, Inc. (the second-largest Baptist organization in the world, after the Southern Baptist Convention), and the General Missionary Baptist Convention of Georgia, Inc.

== See also ==
- No Better Than This, partially recorded in this church.

== Sources ==
- Raboteau, Albert J. (2004). Slave religion: the "invisible institution" in the antebellum South (Updated ed.). Oxford; New York: Oxford University Press. ISBN 978-0-19-517413-7.
