= Sligoville =

- Village
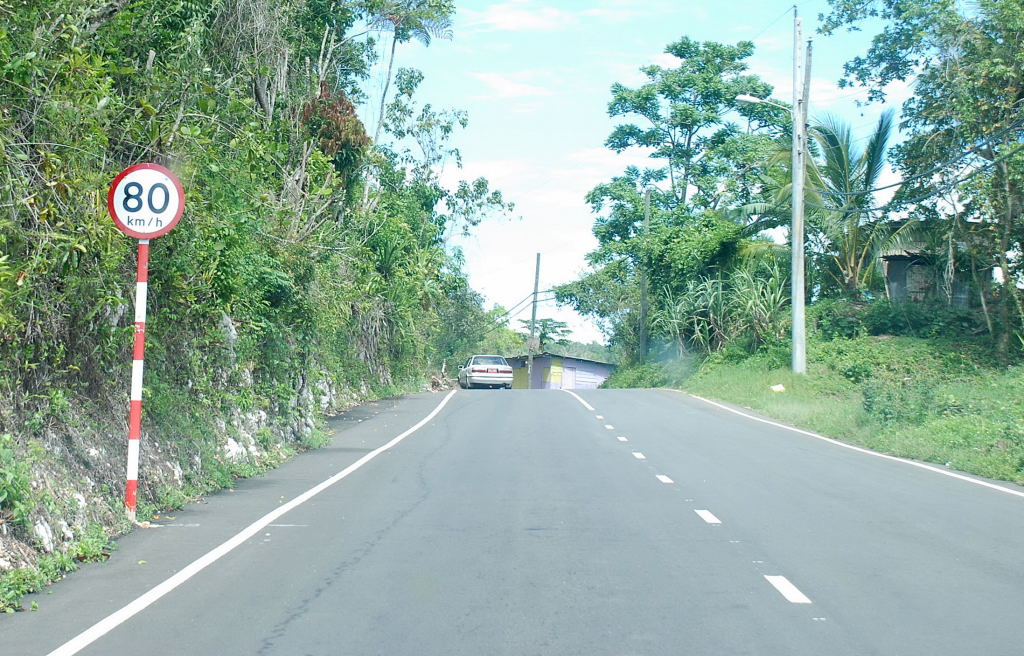
- A view of a road outside of Sligoville

- Location within Jamaica
- Coordinates: 18°06′N 76°57′W
- Country: Jamaica
- Parish: St. Catherine
- First settled: 1835
- Founder: Rev. James Mursell Phillippo

Sligoville (formerly known as Highgate) is a small community approximately 10 miles from Spanish Town in the parish of St. Catherine on the island of Jamaica.

== History ==
On 10 July 1835, Reverend James Phillippo, an English Baptist minister and anti-slavery activist stationed in Spanish Town, purchased 25 acres (10 ha) of land for £100 and established the first "free village" in the West Indies. The land was subsequently divided into quarter-acre lots which the freed slaves could purchase for £3 each. The first former slave to purchase land in Sligoville was former Hampstead Estate headman Henry Lunan. What became known as the "Free Village" system resulted from this first settlement, and similar villages were established throughout the island, most of them by ministers of religion, who supplied land to the ex-slaves who had never owned land before.

Originally named Highgate, the village was renamed as Sligoville (after Howe Browne, Marquess of Sligo and Governor of Jamaica in 1834, the year that freedom came to the enslaved people of Jamaica) on 12 June 1840. Phillippo later established a church and school in Sligoville. The ruins of the Highgate House, which was the residence of several British governors, can still be viewed in Sligoville today, along with the private chapel St. John's Anglican Church that John Augustus O'Sullivan founded in 1840 and the Sligoville Great House, also built by O'Sullivan. The Sligoville Heritage Foundation Benevolent Society, founded by direct descendants of Jamaican slaves, co-organises the annual Sligoville Emanci-Fest with the Jamaica Cultural Development Commission.

Site of Pinnacle, the first Rastafarian village in Jamaica (founded 1940, demolished 1958), see Leonard Howell for details.

== Notable people ==
- Shirley Anne Tate (born March 1956) Jamaican sociologist, scholar, researcher, educator, and author; raised in Sligoville.
