= Thomas Burchell =

Baptist missionary and slavery abolitionist (1799–1846)

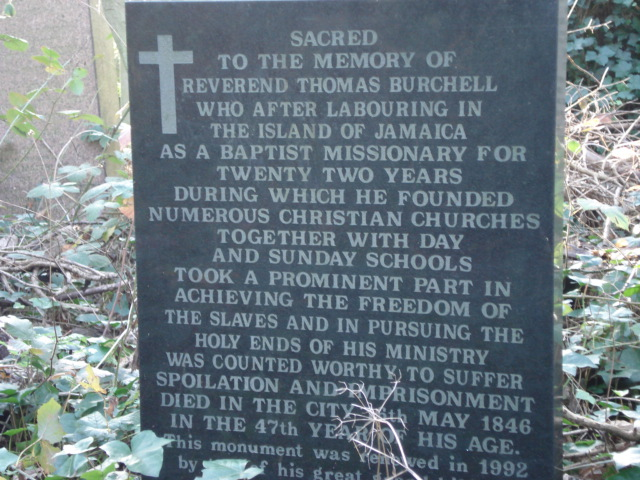
Thomas Burchell's memorial at Abney Park Cemetery

Thomas Burchell (1799–1846) was a leading Baptist missionary and slavery abolitionist in Montego Bay, Jamaica in the early nineteenth century. He was among an early group of missionaries who went out from London in response to a request from African Baptists on the island. He established churches and schools to aid the slaves. Burchell is credited with the concept of Free Villages and encouraging their development by Baptist colleagues such as William Knibb, as well as by other denominations. Anticipating abolition of slavery, he helped raise funds in Great Britain to acquire land for freedmen after they were emancipated, and to develop Free Villages.

Burchell established the Burchell Baptist Church, where he was assisted by deacon and preacher Samuel Sharpe. Active in organizing a strike of workers that resulted in the Baptist War (1831-1832), Sharpe was executed by the government in May 1832. Burchell had evaded such retaliation, but returned to Jamaica to continue as a missionary after conditions had calmed down. He continued to preach to people all over his parish, and to set up schools and churches. He died in London of the fever, when he had a relapse after returning for a short visit.

His first church was renamed as Burchell Memorial Church in his honor. Many Jamaican parents name their children 'Burchell'; it is almost as popular a given or Christian name as Manley.

== Early life and education ==
Thomas Burchell was born on Christmas Day, 25 December 1799, in Tetbury, Gloucestershire. He had a brother William, who supported his later missionary efforts. Their paternal grandfather was the Baptist minister in the town. Among his ancestors was reportedly Sir Isaac Newton.

Burchell initially trained to go into cloth manufacturing in Nailsworth. While there, he was influenced by the Shortwood Baptist Church and determined to prepare as a missionary. He attended Bristol Academy for more education. Before leaving England, he married Hester Crocker (née Lusty). Burchell was 23 when they traveled to Jamaica for him to begin work as a Baptist missionary. In the early 1820s, missionaries were instructed by their society to stay out of issues related to the institution of slavery.

== Missionary career ==
He worked from his base in Montego Bay, Jamaica for twenty-two years, from 1824–46. During these years, the abolition movement developed in the colony, which he supported. He wrote letters to family, friends and the missionary society in England about the harsh conditions of slavery. He and his wife lived to see the abolition of slavery in the British Empire, in the period from 1834, when children of slave mothers were considered free at birth and adults were subject to multi-year "apprenticeships," to 1838, when all chattel slavery was ended.

Burchell established what was called Burchell Baptist Church, built in 1824 in Montego Bay, the year of his arrival in Jamaica. He appointed as deacon Samuel Sharpe, a man who was born into slavery in Jamaica but had gained an education. Sharpe became a recognized leader and preacher in the Baptist Church.

In November 1827, Thomas' brother William Burchell published one of his letters in The Particular Baptist in England, in which Burchell criticised the plantocracy, especially its efforts to limit the religious life of slaves. Excerpts made the rounds in Jamaica, and Burchell encountered criticism from the planters. After the Christmas Rebellion or "Baptist War" of 1831, a massive slave rebellion of an estimated 60,000 slaves across the island, planters suspected that Burchell and other Baptist missionaries had encouraged it. Burchell had been away from the island during the events, but was investigated when he returned. Avoiding detention, he left with his family in March 1832 for their safety.

The Jamaican government and planters conducted massive reprisals against suspected slaves and allies after using troops to suppress the rebellion in December and January 1832. During the two weeks of troop activity, forces killed more than 200 slaves outright. Afterward, the government executed from 310 to 340 slaves through the judicial process, including many for minor offenses. Sometimes three or four slaves were hanged at the same time, as an example.

Burchell's deacon Samuel Sharpe, who had organized a general strike of slaves to protest working conditions, was captured in the roundup of hundreds of suspects. He was convicted of having a major role in the rebellion and executed by hanging in May 1832.

Following the rebellion, numerous Baptist chapels were destroyed, as whites thought they had encouraged the slave revolt. A white mob burned down the Burchell Baptist Church and Manse. The church and Manse were not rebuilt until 1834, but Burchell had returned before that to continue his preaching and teaching. In the 20th century, The Manse has been adapted for use and renamed as the Burchell Memorial Church; it is preserved and managed by the Jamaica National Heritage Trust, founded in 1958. The church is located in Montego Bay at number one King Street, at the corner of Market Street.

Starting in the 1830s, in anticipation of the emancipation under discussion in Parliament, the Jamaican Baptist congregations, deacons, and ministers proposed the Caribbean concept of "free villages": to grant freedpeople plots of land for their own to cultivate as the basis of independent villages, to be organized around a Baptist church. Burchell developed this idea especially with fellow English Baptist missionaries William Knibb and James Phillippo.

Leaders of missionary Baptist chapels approached their financiers in England, who could instruct land agents in London to buy Jamaican land and hold it for establishment of free villages, for freedmen to gain independence of the planters. Many plantation owners and others in the landowning class had made it clear they would never sell any land to freed slaves, but provide only "tied accommodation" at the rents they chose. Their goal for labour after emancipation was to prevent free labour choice and movement of workers among employers, and keep costs low or negligible.

Due to Burchell's initiative, Sandy Bay, Jamaica, was founded as a Baptist Free Village for freedmen. Today its playing field is named Burchell Field in his honor. Several other free villages, including the very first, were founded through the work of Rev. James Phillippo, one of Burchell's Baptist associates. Knibb also founded some Free Villages. Other denominations quickly adopted this concept.

The missionaries were not able to provide for the mass of freedmen, but their several Free Villages allowed more families to build independent lives in the post-emancipation years. As the Baptists on the island were making headway and the economy was strong, Burchell urged that the Jamaica Baptist Church become independent of the Baptist Missionary Society, which it did in the 1840s. Later there were more financial problems, especially after Britain imposed a tariff in 1846.

Many of the missionaries provided health care to the freedmen. Burchell moved for his own health to Mount Carey, in the hills above Montego Bay. He established a dispensary, administering to thousands of freedmen annually. He trained local people to assist in dressing of wounds and other procedures. He began to mix his own preparations, based on studies of chemistry in college, in order to be able to care for his people, as he could not afford to import all supplies.

== Legacy ==
Thomas Burchell's passion for educating the youth of Jamaica still thrives through The Burchell Youth Development Foundation, created in his honor to continue his work. The Foundation's primary mission as a Caribbean nonprofit is to help uplift and sustain the youth of Jamaica, empowering them to build better lives for themselves through spiritual and educational support. The Foundation was established as a tax exempt 501(c)3 nonprofit in March 2015. It partners with local Jamaican Baptist and Roman Catholic Churches (including the Burchell Memorial Baptist Church, established by Thomas Burchell in 1824) to identify, select and monitor deserving students in the civic parishes of Westmoreland, St. James, Trelawny, Hanover and St.Ann.

== Personal life ==
Burchell and his wife Hester Crocker Lusty (d. 1856, Mt. Carey, Jamaica) had one daughter, Esthrana Louisa Burchell (b. Falmouth, Jamaica 1827, d. 1903 Kingston). She became the second wife of widower Rev. Edward Hewett (b. 1819, Norfolk, England-d. 1883, Mt. Carey, Jamaica), with whom she had twelve children.

In 1846 Burchell caught "the fever" from his friend Knibb, whom he helped care for before Knibb's death in 1845. Burchell still felt weakened in the new year and returned to England in April, visiting with friends. There he suffered a relapse and died on 16 May 1846. His wife, who was still in Jamaica expecting his return, arranged his burial in London.

== Burial ==
Burchell is buried at the non-denominational Abney Park Cemetery in Stoke Newington, London. In 1992 his great-grandchildren erected a memorial at his gravesite.

== Bibliography ==
- "Death of the Rev. Thomas Burchell, of Jamaica", in The Church, p. 93, January 1846.
- Gardner, W. J. A History of Jamaica from its Discovery by Christopher Columbus to the Present Time... Elliot Stock (London, 1878).
- Papers Relative to the West Indies, 1840, Part I, Jamaica. Clowes and Sons, p. 58 (1840).
- Morrison, Doreen. 2014. Slavery's Heroes: George Liele and the Ethiopian Baptists of Jamaica 1783 - 1865. CreateSpace. ISBN 978-1500657574
