= Edwin Paxton Hood =

English nonconformist, writer, biographer and author

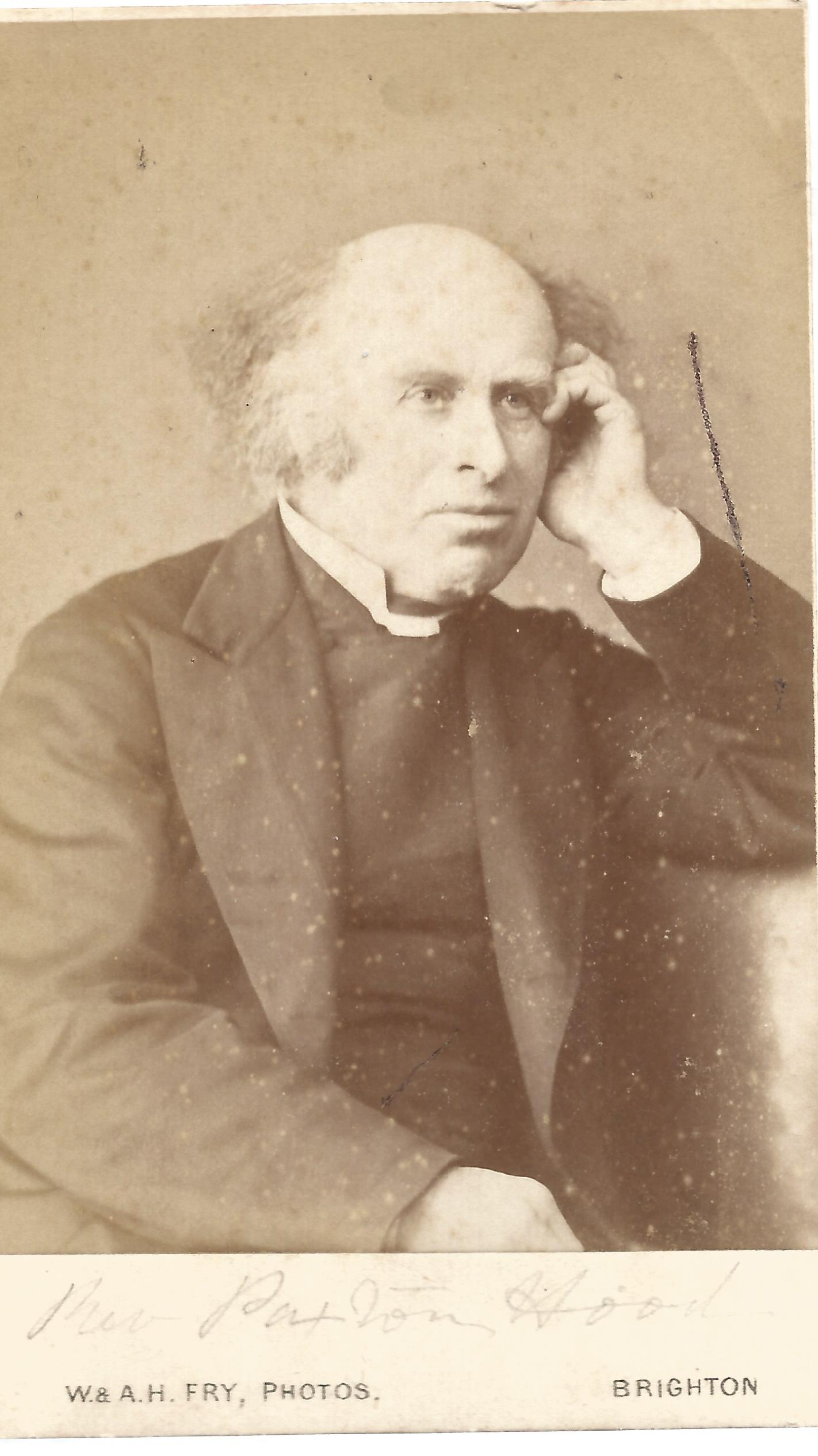
- Edwin Paxton Hood, carte de visite circa 1870
- Born: 24 October 1820; Piccadilly, London, England
- Died: 12 June 1885 (aged 64); Paris, France
- Occupations: writer, Nonconformist minister

Edwin Paxton Hood (1820–1885) was an English nonconformist, writer, biographer and author.

== Life ==
Hood was born in Half Moon Street, Piccadilly, Westminster, London, on 24 October 1820, and baptised 6 May 1821 at St. George's Church, Hanover Square, the son of Thomas Hood, a servant, and Martha his wife. His father had been a seaman in the Royal Navy serving under Nelson in HMS Temeraire. Losing both parents before he was seven years old, he was brought up at Deptford by a heraldic painter named Simpson.

Hood began to lecture on temperance and peace about 1840, and in 1852 entered the congregational ministry. His first charge was at North Nibley in Gloucestershire. In 1857 he moved to Offord Road, Islington. From 1862 to 1873 he officiated at Queen Street, Brighton. He then returned to Offord Road, and later moved to Cavendish Street, Manchester, but resigned his charge in 1880 after political differences with his congregation: he was a strong liberal. After a brief visit to America, he became the pastor of Falcon Square Church, Aldersgate Street in London.

He married firstly 5 Oct 1847 at the Salem Chapel, York, Yorkshire, Jane (died 1 Aug 1851 at Fulford, near York, aged 26, and buried 5 Aug at York Cemetery), the daughter of William Wagstaff of the Bleach Works, Heslingdon, near York. He married secondly 3 Feb 1853 at St. Stephen's Church, Hammersmith, Elizabeth Atkin (died 14 May 1855), daughter of Samuel Bishop Barnby of Hull, Yorkshire, jeweller. In 1857 he married his third wife, Lavinia, the daughter of the Rev. Samuel Oughton of Kingston, Jamaica.

Hook took his last services at Falcon Square Chapel on 7 June 1885 and then departed on a tour of Italy; he had reached only Paris when he died on 12 June 1885. He was buried in Abney Park Cemetery, Stoke Newington.

== Legacy ==
Hood took much interest in the Royal Hospital for Incurables, for which he raised £2,000 by a pamphlet entitled The Palace of Pain, London, 1885. After his death a further sum of £525 was raised by public subscription, and given by his widow to the hospital, one of the wards of which was named after Hood.

== Works ==
Hood became editor of the Eclectic and Congregational Review in 1861 until its final issue in 1868, and later of The Argonaut. He was throughout life a prolific writer of popular books, among them biographies of the nonconformists Thomas Binney, Christmas Evans, and Robert Hall. His main works were:

- ‘The Age and its Architects: ten chapters on the English People in relation to the Times,’ London, 1850; 2nd edit. 1852.
- ‘Self-Education: twelve chapters for Young Thinkers,’ London, 1851, reissued as ‘Self-Formation,’ 3rd edit. 1858, new ed. 1865.
- ‘Old England: Historic Pictures of Life in Old Castles, Forests, Abbeys, and Cities,’ &c., London, 1851.
- ‘Dream Land and Ghost Land: Visits and Wanderings there in the Nineteenth Century,’ London, 1852.
- ‘John Milton: the Patriot and Poet,’ London, 1852.
- ‘The Uses of Biography,’ London, 1852.
- ‘Andrew Marvell: the Wit, Statesman, and Poet: his Life and Writings,’ London, 1853.
- ‘Swedenborg: a Biography and an Exposition,’ London, 1854.
- ‘The Last of the Saxons: Light and Fire from the Writings of William Cobbett,’ London, 1854 (a volume of selections).
- ‘William Wordsworth: a Biography,’ London, 1856.
- ‘The Peerage of Poverty; or Learners and Workers in Fields, Farms, and Factories,’ 1st ser. 3rd edit. London, 1859; 2nd ser. 1861, 5th edit. enlarged, 1870.
- ‘Thomas Binney: his Mind, Life, and Opinions,’ London, 1874.
- ‘Isaac Watts: his Life and Writings, his Homes and Friends,’ London, 1875.
- ‘Thomas Carlyle: Philosophic Thinker, Theologian, Historian, and Poet,’ London, 1875.
- ‘Vignettes of the Great Revival of the Eighteenth Century’ (reprinted from Sunday at Home), London, 1880; 2nd edit. 1887.
- ‘Christmas Evans, the Preacher of Wild Wales: his Country, his Times, and his Contemporaries,’ London, 1881; 3rd edit. 1888.
- ‘Robert Hall,’ London, 1881.
- ‘Oliver Cromwell: his Life, Times, Battlefields, and Contemporaries,’ London, 1882; 2nd edit. 1884.
- ‘Scottish Characteristics,’ London, 1883.
- ‘The Throne of Eloquence: great Preachers, Ancient and Modern,’ London, 1885.
- ‘The Vocation of the Preacher,’ London, 1886.
