= Baptist War =

1831 failed slave rebellion in British-ruled Jamaica

- Part of North American slave revolts
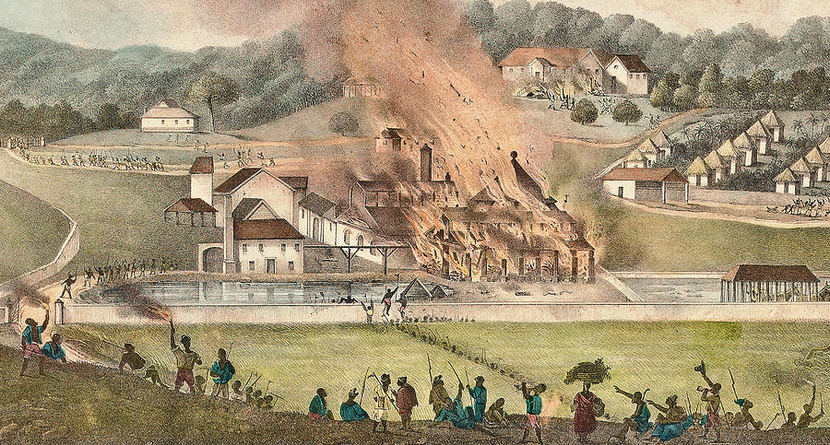
- Destruction of the Roehampton Estate, January 1832, during the Baptist War, by Adolphe Duperly
Date	25 December 1831 – 5 January 1832
Location	Colony of Jamaica
Result	Rebellion suppressed

Belligerents
Colony of Jamaica	Slave rebels

Commanders and leaders
Willoughby Cotton	Samuel Sharpe (executed)

Casualties and losses
14	At least 307

The Baptist War was an eleven-day rebellion that started on 25 December 1831 and involved up to 60,000 of the 300,000 slaves in the Colony of Jamaica. The uprising was led by a black Baptist deacon, Samuel Sharpe, and waged largely by his followers. The revolt, though militarily unsuccessful, played a major part in the abolition of slavery throughout the British Empire. It is also known as the Sam Sharp Rebellion, the Christmas Rebellion, the Christmas Uprising and the Great Jamaican Slave Revolt of 1831–32.

== Ideology ==
The missionary-educated rebels had been following progress of the abolitionist movement in London; their original intention was to call a peaceful general strike. Compared with their Presbyterian, Wesleyan, and Moravian counterparts, Baptist slaves seemed more ready to take action. This may have reflected a higher level of absenteeism among white Baptist missionaries. The relative independence of Black deacons facilitated slaves taking greater ownership over their religious life, including reinterpretations of Baptist theology in terms of their experience (for example, they placed a greater emphasis on the role of John the Baptist, sometimes at the expense of Jesus).

Thomas Burchell, a missionary in Montego Bay, returned from a Christmas vacation in England in late 1831. Rumours circulated among the local Baptist ministry that he was carrying documents signed by William IV that would grant full emancipation. Discontent quickly escalated among slaves when the Jamaican governor announced that the rumours were false and that no emancipation had been granted.

== The strike and the uprising ==
Led by Baptist preacher Samuel Sharpe, enslaved black workers initiated their strike, demanding more freedom and a working wage of "half the going wage rate"; they took an oath to stay away from work until their demands were met. The enslaved labourers, following the example of their ministers, were convinced that the Jamaican government and the plantation owners would capitulate quickly – they were prepared to use force, however, if military action was taken against them.

Sharpe was the inspiration for the rebellion and was nicknamed "Daddy" by his followers. His officers were literate slaves, like him, and they included Johnson, a carpenter called Campbell from the York estate, a waggoner from the Greenwich estate named Robert Gardner, Thomas Dove from the Belvedere estate, John Tharp from the Hazlelymph estate, and George Taylor, who, like Sharpe, was a deacon in Burchell's chapel.

It became the largest slave uprising in the British West Indies, mobilising as many as 60,000 of Jamaica's 300,000 slaves. During the rebellion, fourteen white people and over 307 rebels were killed.

Violence exploded on 27 December when a group of slaves burned down the Kensington estate, in the hills above Montego Bay. The governor appointed Colonel William Grignon, a prominent St. James lawyer and militia commander, to suppress the strike and force the slaves back to work. Grignon was also a powerful landowner with several working estates, including one at Salt Spring, where a series of incidents in December were the sparks for the uprising.

Grignon led his militia against the slaves, expecting them to scatter easily, but strong resistance from rebels armed with stockpiled guns and ammunition forced a retreat. This early victory put Sharpe and his forces in control of the rural areas of the Parish of St James.

On 31 December, the colonial authorities instituted martial law. Sir Willoughby Cotton of the British Army assumed responsibility for dealing with the rebels and enlisted the Jamaican Maroons of Accompong Town to confront Sharpe's followers in the second week of January 1832. Though the Maroons were themselves descended from escaped slaves, they formed a loose alliance with the colonial government to protect their vulnerable community.

Accompong Maroons attacked the rebels at Catadupa, but they too chose to retreat because the rebels were "too strong". They soon gained the upper hand, however, and quickly defeated the rebels in a second skirmish; Sharpe's deputy Campbell was slain. When Cotton's regulars were besieged in their camp by a large rebel army at Maroon Town, the Accompong Maroons relieved them, killing more rebels and capturing scores of them, including another of Sharpe's deputies, Dehany.

When news came that the Windward Maroons from Charles Town, Jamaica and Moore Town had also pledged to fight for Cotton, the rebel cause collapsed. A final battle ended with the capture of rebel leader Gillespie. The remaining slaves, led by Robert Gardner, surrendered when they learned that the Windward Maroons had been sent to finish them off.

== Suppression and death toll ==
The rebellion was quickly suppressed by the colonial authorities. The reaction of the colonial government and reprisals of the plantocracy were far more brutal than any actions undertaken by the rebels; approximately 500 rebels were killed, with 207 killed outright during the revolt. After the rebellion, an estimated 310 to 340 enslaved Jamaicans, including Sharpe, Gardner, and the other captured slave leaders, were killed through "various forms of judicial executions".

Judicial records show that many of the death sentences were ordered for minor offenses (one recorded execution was for the theft of a pig; another, a cow). An 1853 account by missionary Henry Bleby described how the courts commonly executed three or four persons simultaneously; bodies were then piled up and taken by Black labourers to be dumped in mass graves on the outskirts of town.

Total property damage was estimated in the Jamaican Assembly's summary report, issued in March 1832, at £1,154,589 (roughly £124,000,000 in 2021). Thousands of rebels had set fire to more than 100 properties, destroying over 40 sugar works and the homes and estates of nearly 100 white Jamaicans.

White Baptist missionaries were suspected of having encouraged and supplied the rebellion. Some, such as William Knibb and Bleby, were arrested and subjected to tar and feathers but were later released. Churches that had been built for the use of Black congregations were vandalised and destroyed by white mobs.

== Aftermath ==
As result of the Baptist War, hundreds of slaves ran away into the Cockpit Country in order to avoid being forced back into slavery. The Maroons were dispatched to track them down, but only a handful of slaves were captured and sent back to their plantations. Many runaways were still at large when the British government formally abolished slavery in 1833.

Historians argue that the brutality of the Jamaican plantocracy during the revolt accelerated the passage of full emancipation. When Burchell and Knibb gave their accounts before the House of Commons, the representatives were outraged that white Englishmen had been abused for merely associating with rebellious slaves. Parliament passed the Slavery Abolition Act 1833, beginning initial measures late that year, followed by partial emancipation (outright for children six or under, six years' apprenticeship for the rest) in 1834 and then unconditional emancipation of chattel slavery in 1838.

== In literature ==
- Andrea Levy's 2010 novel The Long Song recounts, through a fictional narrative, the events of the Baptist War.
- The 1929 novel The White Witch of Rosehall, by Herbert G. de Lisser, has a climax set in Rose Hall at the time of the Baptist War.
