= James Phillippo =

English Baptist missionary and slavery abolitionist

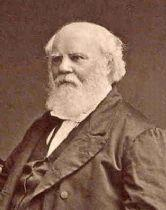
Rev. James Phillippo

James Phillippo (1798 in Norfolk, England – 11 May 1879, in Spanish Town, Jamaica) was an English Baptist missionary in Jamaica who campaigned for the abolition of slavery. He served in Jamaica from 1823 to his death, with some periods lobbying in England for funds to support his work on the island. He led the founding of several Free Villages, having gained funds to grant freedmen and their families plots of land for farming in villages independent of planter control. He also wrote and published three books about Jamaica.

== Early years as a missionary ==
Phillippo was among a small group of Baptist missionaries assigned by the Baptist Missionary Society to Jamaica in the 1820s. They were directed to stay away from commenting on the institution of slavery, which planters depended on for their lucrative sugar cane production. The island population was overwhelmingly ethnic African, with some free people of color and the minority whites.

Philippo sailed from England for Jamaica in 1823 and arrived at a time of great transition: Britain had banned the Atlantic slave trade in 1807, and in 1823 propositions to abolish slavery itself were brought in the House of Commons of the United Kingdom. They were initially rejected with little hope of success. Despite Parliament's failure to pass the legislation, British mission workers in Jamaica, especially Baptists, were criticized by planters and the white population, the press, and the colonial government for being in league with the anti-slavery camp, with the "intention of effecting our ruin." The plantation owners were strongly against missionaries preaching the gospel to the slaves. They were upset that the nonconformist missionaries (chiefly Baptist, Wesleyan and Methodist) were educating slaves and teaching them the Bible, believing that this made the slaves discontented with their station. Some opponents reacted by burning down missionary churches and schools for slaves.

In 1807 there were 350,000 slaves in Jamaica. By 1823, there were still more than 300,000 slaves remaining on the island; the law prohibited them from practicing any form of religion. When Phillippo arrived in Jamaica in 1823, he nonetheless set out to build places of worship and to preach Christianity to the slaves.

He was denied permission to preach to slaves several times, but this did not stop him. Although authorities regularly threatened him with imprisonment and he received death threats from planters, he continued to set up new chapels, schools, Sunday schools and Bible classes. He preached to slaves in villages where his preaching ban was not common knowledge. The slaves reacted enthusiastically to his preaching and crowds of them came to church. In 1825, the British Missionary Society granted Phillippo permission to preach to the slaves. In 1827 he founded a church in Spanish Town, then the capital. It has survived to the 21st century and is known as the Phillippo Baptist Church.

In 1831 Phillippo was unwell and needed to return to England. He learned in February 1832 of the news of a slave insurrection that had broken out in December 1831, which became known as the Christmas Rebellion. As the government in Jamaica. Houses had been burnt, the militia called out, and several missionaries had been arrested, including the Baptist missionaries William Knibb, Whitehorn and Abbott. The enraged planters and white mobs destroyed ten Baptist chapels and mission houses. The government used troops to suppress the uprising, which they did within two weeks, with more than 200 slaves killed outright. Afterward the government prosecuted suspects such as Samuel Sharpe, a black Baptist deacon, and others, quickly convicting them and executing them by hanging.

== Advocate against slavery ==
Phillippo's first role in England as an advocate for the slaves came in June 1832 at the BMS World Mission 40th-anniversary meeting. He and William Knibb described the nature of slavery, the insurrection, the great response to the gospel both from the slaves and free blacks which the missionaries had seen, and how the missionaries had suffered persecution on the island from authorities.

Phillippo returned to Jamaica in 1834, joining with missionaries William Knibb and Thomas Burchell. Together they worked to further the establishment of a free Negro peasantry at the end of the Apprenticeship period. They worried that the planters intended to use coercion against the freedmen as the basic means of control.

== Free Villages and emancipation ==
A unique and highly successful innovation of Burchell and Phillippo was the system of Free Villages. He acquired land (usually via agents, as the owners would not have knowingly sold to him) for settlements where emancipated slaves could live and build houses free from the threat of eviction from their former Estate hovels. He personally stood surety for all monies borrowed, but he conveyed the land to the mission. He founded new chapels at each Village and both Sunday (for religious study) and day schools to educate the young, also organising the training and appointment of teachers. Sligoville, a hilly farming community in Saint Catherine Parish about 10 miles from Spanish Town, was the location of the first Free Village. It was established by Phillipo in 1835, in anticipation of the emancipation of slaves three years later. After the success of Sligoville, several other Free Villages were started by Phillippo, including Oracabessa and Sandy Bay.

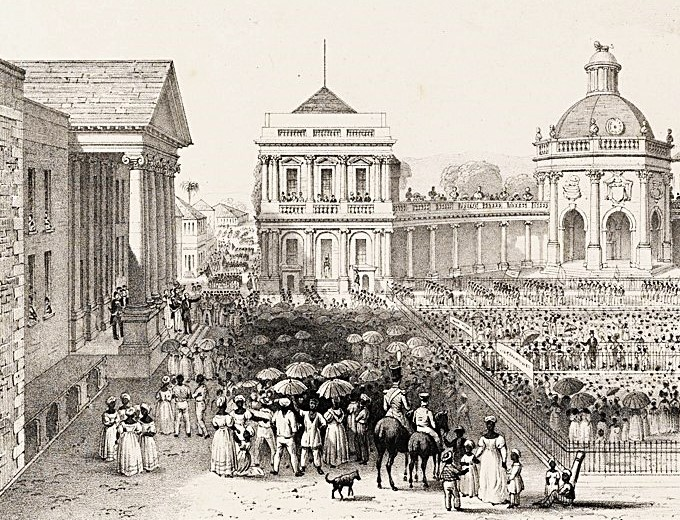
Governor Sir Lionel Smith, accompanied by James Phillippo, proclaiming the abolition of slavery in the colony of Jamaica, on 1 August 1838, from the King's House in Spanish Town

While slavery was officially ended on 1 August 1834, with the Slavery Abolition Act 1833, it was not until the end of apprenticeship in 1838 that all slaves were finally free. The celebration of Emancipation on 1 August 1838 was a joyous time in Spanish Town, with a large turnout of freed slaves. Phillipo was asked by Governor Sir Lionel Smith to lead the procession of the Baptist Church and Congregation of Spanish Town, along with about 2,000 school children and their teachers to Government House, where the Proclamation of Freedom was read to a crowd of more than 8,000 people.

In June 1842, Phillippo his wife Hannah and their younger son Edwin, set sail for England. They claimed the trip for health but Philippo also used it to the Missionary Society for permission and funding for a new school and college, known as Calabar College, a type of seminary which he had built with Knibb and Burchell. Calabar College changed its name to Calabar High School in 1912 and still operates today. While in England, Phillippo travelled extensively, lectured to raise funds for the college, and completed the manuscript for his first book. The Phillippos returned to Jamaica in December 1843.

== Final years ==
The trip in 1843 was Philippo's last major voyage abroad. Other than a few trips to the United States, Phillippo remained in Jamaica for the next 35 years. He never stopped preaching and constantly travelled all over Jamaica to bring the "Word of God" to those who needed it. When his beloved wife, Hannah, died in 1874, he moved to a small cottage outside Kingston. He continued his missionary work until he retired on Sunday, 7 July 1878. Worn out by a long, difficult life in an unfriendly climate, he died on 11 May 1879 in Spanish Town at the age of 81.

Phillippo was buried, along with his wife and daughter, across the street from his church in Spanish Town. The funeral was a grand occasion, attracting thousands of former slaves as well as politicians, clergy, and businessmen.

== Legacy ==
In addition to Phillippo's work as a minister and champion of human rights, he wrote three books about Jamaica, the most notable being Jamaica: Its Past and Present State (1842), published while he was recuperating in England.

Phillippo and his wife had nine children together, five of whom died in childhood. Son George Phillippo had a long and distinguished career as a lawyer, politician, and statesman, being knighted for his service.

Many of James Phillippo's descendants live in Jamaica. Among them is a great-great-grandson, noted author Colin Simpson. He owns the historic Golden Clouds villa in Oracabessa.
