= Kettering, Jamaica =

Kettering
- Location within Jamaica
- Coordinates: 18.4685°N 77.5336°W
- Country: Jamaica
- Parish: Trelawny
- Founder: William Knibb

Kettering was a Free Village in Trelawny, Jamaica. It is now part of Duncans. It was named after Kettering in England, the birthplace of William Knibb, its founder.

== Amenities ==
- Kettering Baptist Church, founded 1844
