= William Knibb =

Baptist missionary and slavery abolitionist

The Honourable William Knibb OM
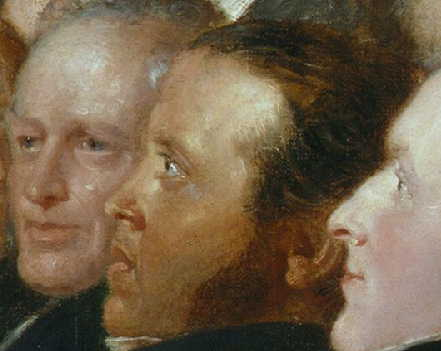
- Knibb in the centre, to the left is John Burnet and to the right is John Scoble - 1840
- Born: 7 September 1803; Kettering, England
- Died: 15 November 1845 (aged 42); Kettering, Jamaica
- Spouse: Mary Watki(n)s

William Knibb, OM (7 September 1803 in Kettering – 15 November 1845) was an English Baptist minister and missionary to Jamaica. He is chiefly known today for his work to free enslaved Africans.

In 1988, on the 150th anniversary of the abolition of slavery in the British Empire, Knibb was posthumously awarded the Jamaican Order of Merit. He was the first white male to receive the country's highest civil honour.

== Early life ==
William was born in Kettering, Northamptonshire. His father was a tradesman, Thomas Knibb, and his mother, Mary (née Dexter) was active in the local independent church. His parents had eight children, the eldest, also named Thomas being born on 11 October 1799. William was their fifth child, along with his sister, Ann.

Knibb's elder brother Thomas was a missionary-schoolmaster in Jamaica. When Thomas died at 24, William volunteered to replace him. A dedication service was held in Bristol on 7 October 1824, two days after he had married Mary Watkins (or Watkis). The newly-weds sailed to Jamaica on 5 November 1824, when William was aged only 21.

Knibb found six English Baptist missionaries, African-Caribbean Baptist deacons, and thriving congregations already in Jamaica when he arrived. Together they were following the pioneering work of the African preacher George Lisle, a former slave from Virginia who had arrived in 1782 and founded a Baptist church in Kingston. Knibb began work as the schoolmaster of the Baptist mission school in Kingston and worked closely with fellow missionaries Thomas Burchell and James Phillippo, who formed a trio. In 1828 he moved to Savanna-la-Mar. In 1830 he became the minister responsible for the Baptist church at Falmouth, which had regular congregations of 600 when he arrived. He remained there as minister until he died.

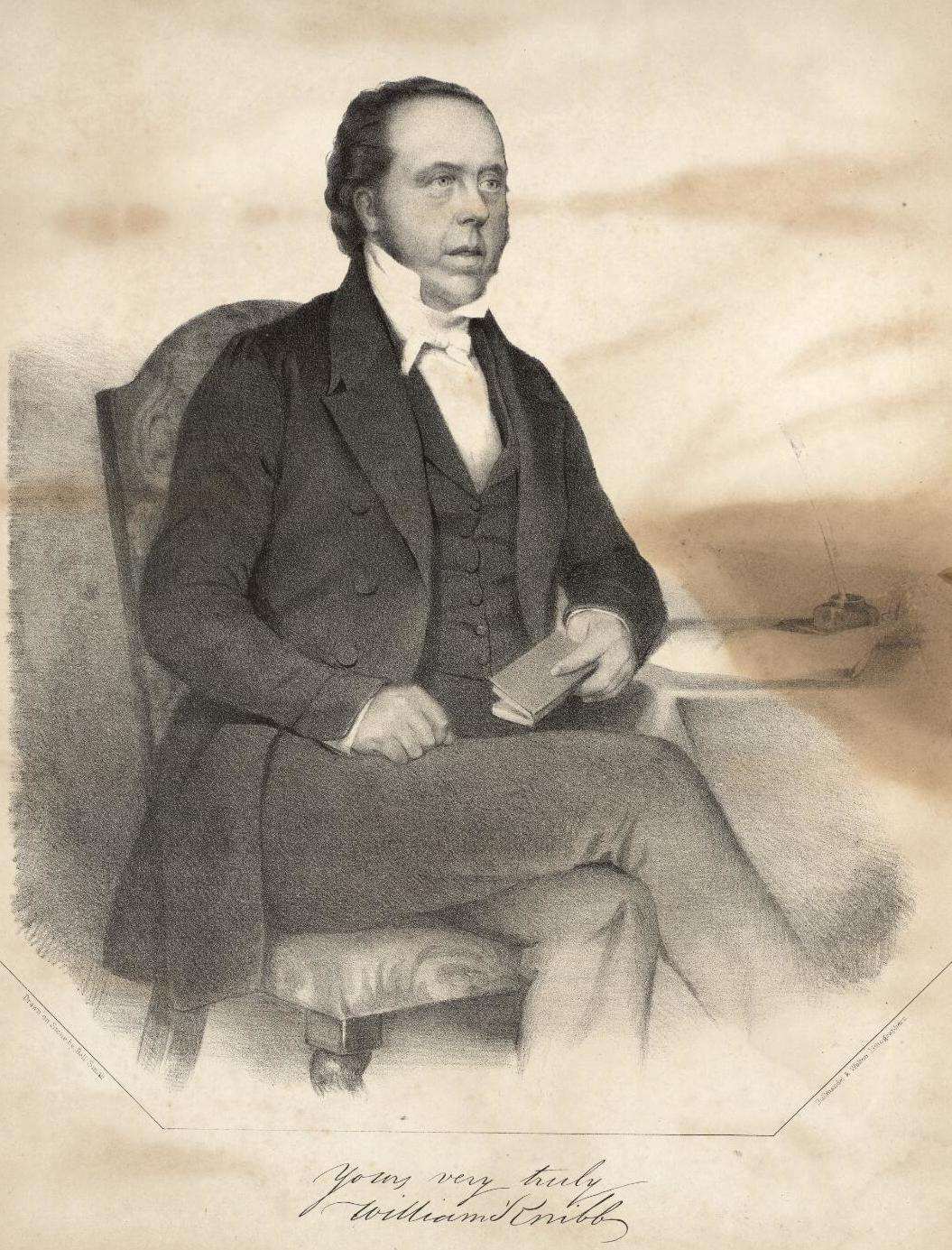
Portrait and signature of William Knibb, 1845

== Attitude to slavery ==
The Baptists in Jamaica were founded by freed slaves, notably George Lisle, who sought support and finance for schools and chapels from nonconformists abroad, particularly from the English Baptist movement, which William Knibb contributed to. Jamaica had become a major sugar exporter, relying on slavery. Knibb sided with the slaves and the cause of emancipation.

The cursed blast of slavery has, like a pestilence, withered almost every moral bloom. I know not how any person can feel a union with such a monster, such a child of hell. I feel a burning hatred against it and look upon it as one of the most odious monsters that ever disgraced the earth. The iron hand of oppression daily endeavours to keep the slaves in the ignorance to which it has reduced them.

— William Knibb

Knibb made his feelings clear. When Sam Swiney, a black slave, was unjustly accused of a minor offence, Knibb spoke for him in court. In a gross miscarriage of justice, the colonial authorities convicted Swiney and had him flogged. But Knibb refused to let the matter drop, and published details in an island newspaper, for which he was threatened with a prosecution for libel. His account reached the Secretary of State in London, who eventually dismissed from office the two responsible magistrates.

Knibb and his Baptist colleagues were instrumental in opposing the repeated attempts by the House of Assembly to enact draconian legislation in Jamaica during the 1820s, the Consolidated Slave Law, and in persuading the British parliament to forbid the passage of the law.

Not surprisingly, Knibb was highly popular with the slaves. Not long afterwards the church in Falmouth needed a minister and Knibb's name was put forward. The missionary who chaired the meeting recorded that when he proposed Knibb should be their new minister and asked for a show of hands, the entire membership stood up, held up both hands, and wept.

== Violence ==
At this time pressure was growing in Britain for the abolition of slavery in the British colonies. The colonial authorities exerted all their political influence to halt this movement, while the slaves' excitement and anticipation grew. Eventually this unstable mix resulted in the Baptist War, led by Samuel Sharpe. The colonial authorities enacted harsh measures to suppress the revolt, treating the missionaries with great suspicion. Knibb himself was placed under armed guard and only obtained bail through the intervention of two prominent colonialists.

In the mayhem George Bridges, an Anglican clergyman, formed an association of white Jamaicans to oppose the anti-slavery movement by all necessary means. This Colonial Church Union used the cover of martial law to attack numerous abolitionist clergymen. White planters burned down a dozen Baptist chapels, including Knibb's at Falmouth. They forced many missionaries to leave Jamaica, but not Knibb. The planters plotted to murder him, but the plot became known and Knibb's family found refuge with one of the leading islanders. After his release, for three successive nights a group of 50 white planters stoned his lodging.

== Jamaica's advocate ==
In 1832 the Baptist slaves of Jamaica decided to send Knibb back to England to plead their cause. Once home he toured England and Scotland, speaking at public meetings. He told the truth about the good work being done by the nonconformist churches in Jamaica, and about the treatment of the enslaved population.

Knibb's public addresses had a power altogether overwhelming. Sceptics were convinced, waverers became decided, apathetic people were roused, and great numbers of hearts everywhere kindled to irrepressible support.

— Peter Masters

Knibb himself later recalled his efforts.

I was forced from the den of infamy and from a gloomy prison, with my congregation scattered, many of the members of my church murdered, and multitudes of the faithful lashed. I came home and I shall never forget the three years of struggle, and the incessant anxiety upon my spirit as I passed through the length and breadth of the country detailing the slaves' wrongs.

— William Knibb

Knibb was summoned to appear before committees of both Houses of Parliament that had been convened to investigate the state of the West Indian colonies.

Knibb's evidence...was so authentic and unassailable that it contributed more than that of any other witness to the conviction of all, that slavery must be speedily abolished.

— Peter Masters

== Abolition ==
At last in May 1833 a Bill for the Abolition of Slavery in the Colonies was introduced. This was enacted later that year. The date for the termination of slavery was 1 August 1834, but slaves had to endure a further six-year 'apprenticeship' before they were granted full freedom. The planters ruthlessly abused this provision. A new law was passed by the Jamaican House of Assembly to thwart the intention behind the Act. This Jamaican legislation prevented emancipation by compelling former slaves to work in an apprenticeship scheme under which the proceeds of their work were to be used to buy out inflated apprenticeship values of £60, £80, or £90 or higher, as set by their former owners. Knibb and others opposed these abuses, so that Parliament brought forward the date for full emancipation from 1840 to 1838.

== Education and social care ==
With emancipation came great social changes. At a stroke thousands of slave children also became free, for whom there was no education provided. Knibb did what he could, but was hampered by a lack of teachers. Upon emancipation, the adult slaves were released into a world without any education or institutions to support them. The church ministers were often the only people to whom the freed slaves could go for legal advice. Knibb remarked that "Often I have had persons come to me for advice who have walked twenty miles to ask for it."

Knibb helped to raise money to purchase thousands of acres of land, to enable 19,000 former slaves to own their own property.

== Religious revival ==
Knibb is on the right of centre at the front in this painting which is of the 1840 World Anti-Slavery Convention. Henry Beckford is the central figure with his back to the observer. Move your cursor to identify him or click icon to enlarge

With emancipation also came great religious changes. During 1838-45 came the religious revival known as the Jamaican Awakening. Many thousands of former slaves joined the nonconformist churches. Knibb recalled that "in those seven years, through the labour of about twenty [Baptist] missionaries, 22,000 people were baptised upon their profession of faith in Jesus Christ". Knibb personally baptised 6,000 converts, and translated the Bible into Creole, the native language of the slaves.

In 1839 the Birmingham Anti-Slavery Society became the Birmingham Branch of the British and Foreign Anti-Slavery Society. This society was planning a major convention in 1840 with Joseph Sturge taking the lead. Knibb as invited. Thomas Swan, who led Birmingham's Cannon Street Baptist chapel, was able to meet Knibb who he and Joseph Sturge had worked hard to support. Knibb had already encouraged his congregation in Jamaica to take unilateral action and free any of their unpaid staff. Knibb had brought with him to England two deacons from Jamaica named Edward Barrett and Henry Beckford. These two men spoke to 5,000 people at Birmingham Town Hall and Beckford became the central figure in Haydon's painting that commemorated the World Anti-Slavery Convention.

By 1845, the Baptists in Jamaica had built 47 new chapels to replace those burned down by the Colonial Church Union. Many of the churches, almost entirely made up of former slaves, were financially independent. Knibb's own church at Falmouth had grown over the previous ten years from 650 to 1,280 members. Over 3,000 adults had been baptised, two thirds of whom had been sent out to form new churches. Six daughter churches were planted by the Falmouth church alone. Knibb was personally associated with the founding of 35 churches, 24 missions, and 16 schools. Knibb bought land in 1845 which he used to create the village of Granville, Jamaica that was named after Granville Sharp.

== Death and legacy ==
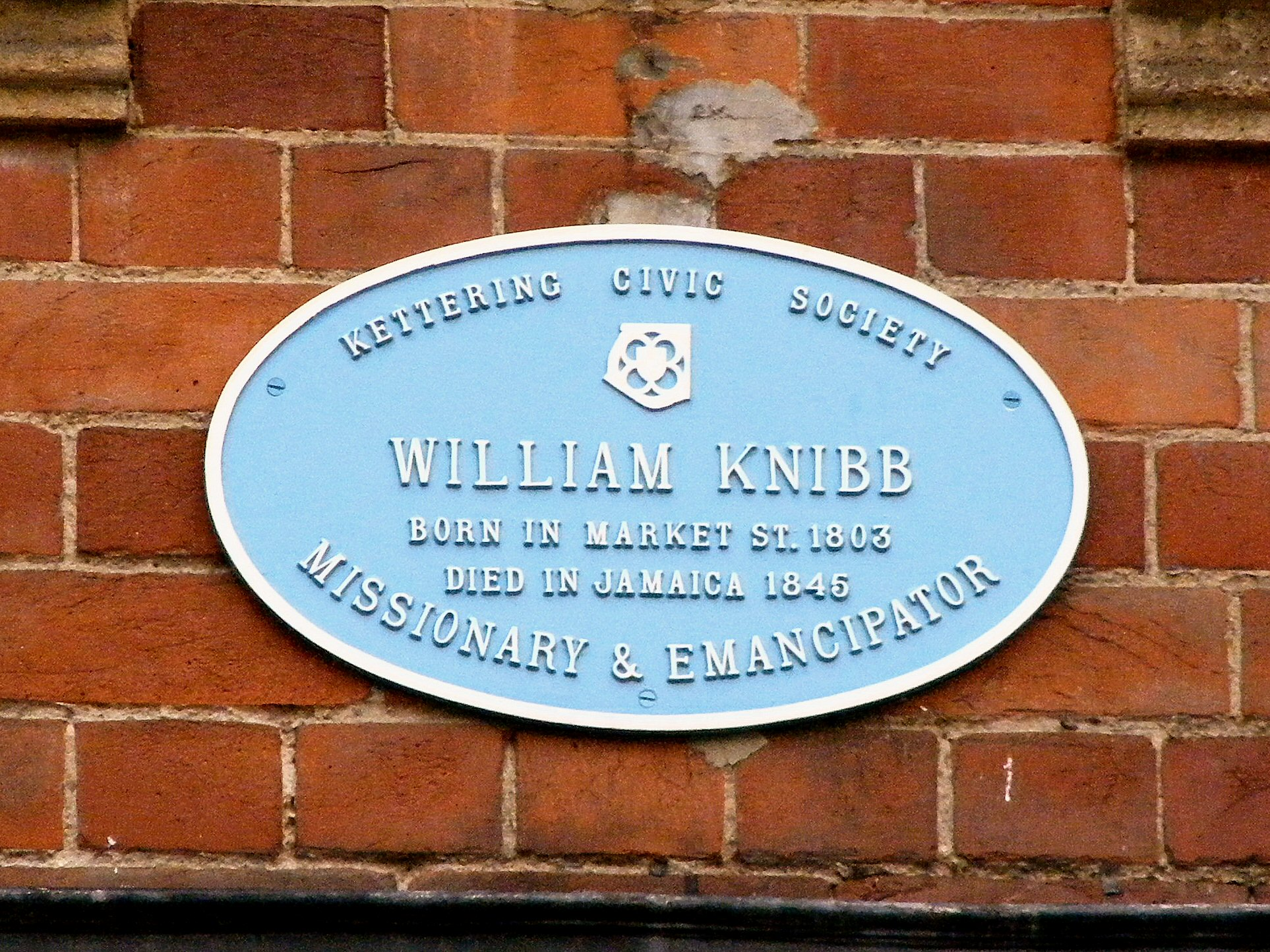
Blue plaque at Knibb's birthplace in Market Street, Kettering, England

Knibb died of fever in Jamaica on 15 November 1845, aged 42, and was buried at his Baptist Falmouth Chapel, the service attracting eight thousand African islanders. His funeral sermon by pastor Samuel Oughton was taken from Zechariah, xi, 2 "Howl, fir tree, for the mighty cedar is fallen".

In 1988, the 150th anniversary of the abolition of slavery in the British Empire, Knibb was posthumously awarded the Jamaican Order of Merit; the first white man to receive the country's highest civil honour.

This monument was erected by the emancipated slaves to whose enfranchisement and elevation his indefatigable exertions so largely contributed; by his fellow labourers who admired and loved him, and deeply deplore his early removal; and by friends of various creeds and parties, as an expression of their esteem for one whose praise as a man, a philanthropist, and a Christian minister, is in all the churches, and who, being dead, yet speaketh.

— The inscription on the tomb of William Knibb at Kettering Baptist Church, Trelawny, Jamaica

William Knibb Memorial High School in Trelawny, Jamaica is named for him.

== Other sources ==
- The official archive for Knibb, formerly held by the Baptist Missionary Society, is held by the Regents Park College Library, Oxford.
- The classic biography, by a contemporary and published within two years of the subject's death, is J. H. Hinton's Life of William Knibb, London, 1847. The work by Peter Masters (Masters, P., 2006: Missionary triumph Over Slavery: William Knibb and Jamaican Emancipation, Wakeman Trust, London. ISBN 978-1-870855-53-2) is mostly an abridged and updated version of Hinton.
- E. Wyn James, "Welsh Ballads and American Slavery", Welsh Journal of Religious History, 2 (2007), pp. 59–86. ISSN 0967-3938. Includes references to Knibb and his Welsh-speaking wife, and to a Welsh translation of his address in Exeter Hall, London in 1832.
- Morrison, Doreen. 2014. Slavery's Heroes: George Liele and the Ethiopian Baptists of Jamaica 1783 - 1865. CreateSpace. ISBN 978-1500657574. A section of the book tells of how William Knibb as a part of the Baptist Missionary Society took over the reins of leadership of Baptists in Jamaica, and his increasing sympathy for their cause (Emancipation) following the death and execution of African Baptist leaders prior to and following the Baptist War 1831 - 1832.
