= Samuel Sharpe =

Jamaican slave-rebellion leader (1801–1832)

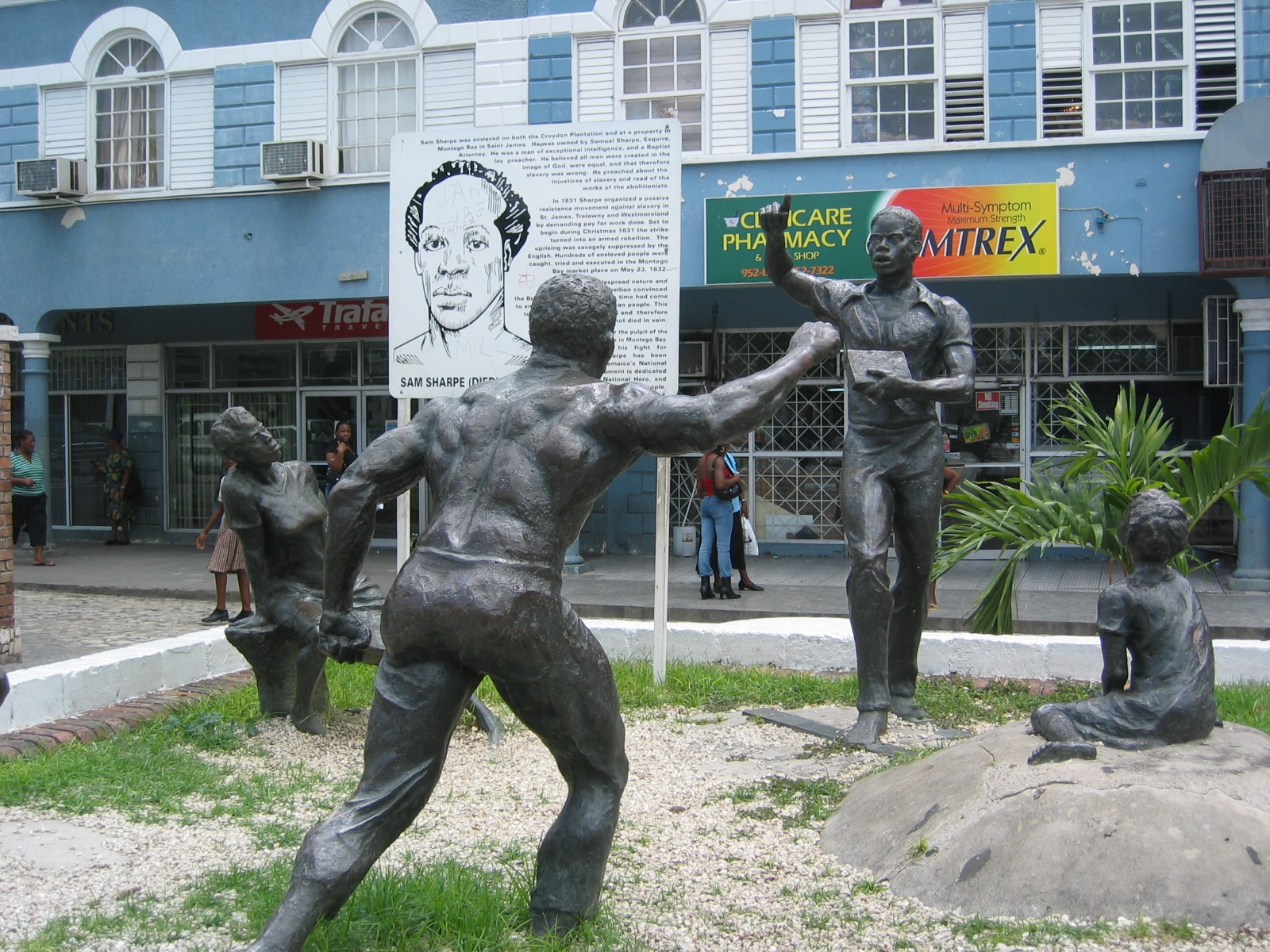
Sam Sharpe Square

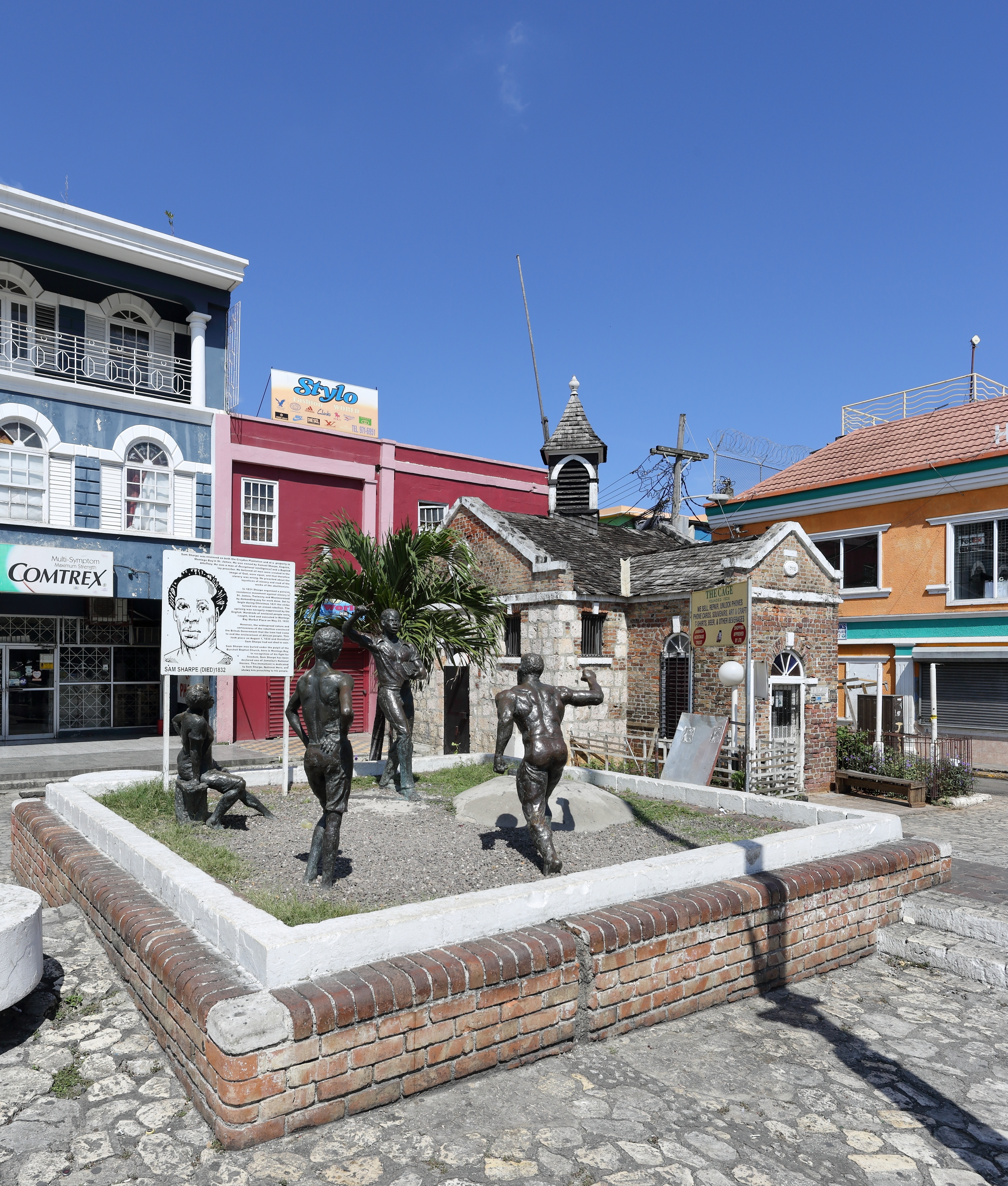
Sam Sharpe Memorial, Montego Bay

Samuel Sharpe, or Sharp (1801 – 23 May 1832), also known as Sam Sharpe, was an enslaved Jamaican who was the leader of the widespread 1831–32 Baptist War slave rebellion (also known as the Christmas Rebellion) in Jamaica.

He was proclaimed a National Hero of Jamaica on 31 March 1982 and his image is on the $50 Jamaican banknote.

== Biography ==
Samuel Sharpe was born into slavery in the parish of St James, Jamaica, on a plantation owned by Samuel and Batty Sharpe. The Slave Return of 1832 announcing his death gave his name as Archer aka Samuel Sharpe, the son of Eve, and he was only 31 years old when he died. The Slave Return of Samuel and Jane Sharpe in 1817 showed a young 12-year-old Archer on the plantation with his mother Juda Bligom and siblings Joe (two years old) and Eliza (20 years old). He was allowed to become educated, for which he was well respected by his enslaved peers.

Sharpe became a well-known preacher, leader and missionary in the Baptist Church, which had long welcomed the enslaved as members and recognized them as preachers. He was a deacon at the Burchell Baptist Church in Montego Bay, whose pastor was Rev. Thomas Burchell, a missionary from England. Sharpe spent most of his time travelling to different parishes in Jamaica, educating the enslaved about Christianity, which he believed promised freedom.

== Baptist War ==
Where possible, the enslaved closely followed the British Parliament's discussions surrounding the abolition of slavery. In the mistaken belief that emancipation had already been granted by the Queen of India, Sharpe organised a peaceful general strike across many estates in western Jamaica to protest working conditions. This took place during the harvest of sugar cane, a critical time for the plantation owners: generally the workforce had to work overtime to process the cane quickly at its peak. The Christmas Rebellion (Baptist War) began on 27 December 1831 at the Kensington Estate. Reprisals by the plantation owners led to the rebels' burning the crops.

Sharpe's originally peaceful protest turned into Jamaica's largest slave rebellion. The uprising lasted for 10 days and spread throughout the entire island, mobilizing as many as 60,000 of Jamaica's enslaved population. The colonial government used the armed Jamaican military forces and warriors from the towns of the Jamaican Maroons to put down the rebellion, suppressing it within two weeks. Some 14 whites were killed by armed slave battalions, but more than 200 slaves were killed by troops. Afterwards, more reprisals followed. The government tried, convicted, and hanged many of the leaders, including Sharpe, in 1832. A total of 310 to 340 were executed through the judicial process, including many for purely property offences such as theft of livestock.

In the months leading up to his execution, while in jail, Sharpe had several meetings with Rev. Henry Bleby, a missionary, who reported that Sharpe told him: "I would rather die upon yonder gallows than live my life in slavery." The rebellion and government response provoked two detailed Parliamentary Inquiries. The Jamaican government's severe reprisals in the aftermath of the rebellion are believed to have contributed to passage by Parliament of the Slavery Abolition Act 1833 and final abolition of slavery across the British Empire in 1838.

== Legacy ==
- In 1982, the government of independent Jamaica proclaimed Sharpe a National Hero, with the posthumous title of Rt. Excellent Samuel Sharpe.
- Also in 1975, Sam Sharpe Teachers' College was founded and named in his honour in Granville, a suburb of Montego Bay.
- Sharpe's image is used on the modern Jamaican $50 bill pre-2023. In 2023 this was changed to the new $500 bill.
- The British jazz saxophonist Courtney Pine (of Jamaican parentage) included an instrumental composition "Samuel Sharpe" as a tribute on his 2012 album House of Legends.
- Sam Sharpe is referenced by Vybz Kartel in his 2019 song "Stand Strong".
- Daddy Sharpe: A Narrative of the Life and Adventures of Samuel Sharpe, West Indian Slave – Written by Himself, 1832, a fictionalized account of Sharpe's life, by Fred W. Kennedy, was published in 2008.

== See also ==
- History of Jamaica
- Slavery in the British and French Caribbean
- Thomas Burchell

== Sources ==
- Bleby, Henry (1853). Death Struggles of Slavery: Being a Narrative of Facts and Incidents Which Occurred in a British Colony, During the Two Years Immediately Preceding Negro Emancipation.
- Craton, Michael (1983). Testing the Chains: Resistance to Slavery in the British West Indies. Cornell University Press.
