= Poma (disambiguation) =

Poma is a French company which manufactures cable-driven lift systems.

Poma may also refer to:

== People ==
- Poma (surname)
- Saint Poma, late 3rd century Roman saint

== Places ==
- La Poma Department, Argentina, a department in Salta Province
  - La Poma, a village and rural municipality, capital of the department

== Other uses ==
- Grupo Poma, an El Salvadoran company
- PomA, a protein
- Tinetti test or Performance Oriented Mobility Assessment (POMA), a test for assessing a person's balance abilities

== See also ==
- Pomas, a commune in France
