= El Cobre =

El Cobre or Cobre may refer to:

- El Cobre, Cuba
- Rio Cobre, Jamaica
- Cobre (Vegadeo), a village of Vegadeo, Asturias, Spain
- El Cobre, Táchira, Venezuela
- Cobre, Nevada, United States
- Cobre, New Mexico, United States

== See also ==
- Cobre mine (disambiguation)
- Cobres, a municipality of Salta Province, Argentina
- San Antonio de los Cobres, a municipality of Salta Province, Argentina
