= Cobre mine =

Cobre mine (copper mine) may refer to:

- Cobre mine, Cuba, a defunct copper mine in Cuba
- Cobre mine, Panama, a recently opened copper mine in Panama
