= Cobre mine, Cuba =

Copper mine in El Cobre, Santiago de Cuba, Cuba

Cobre Mine
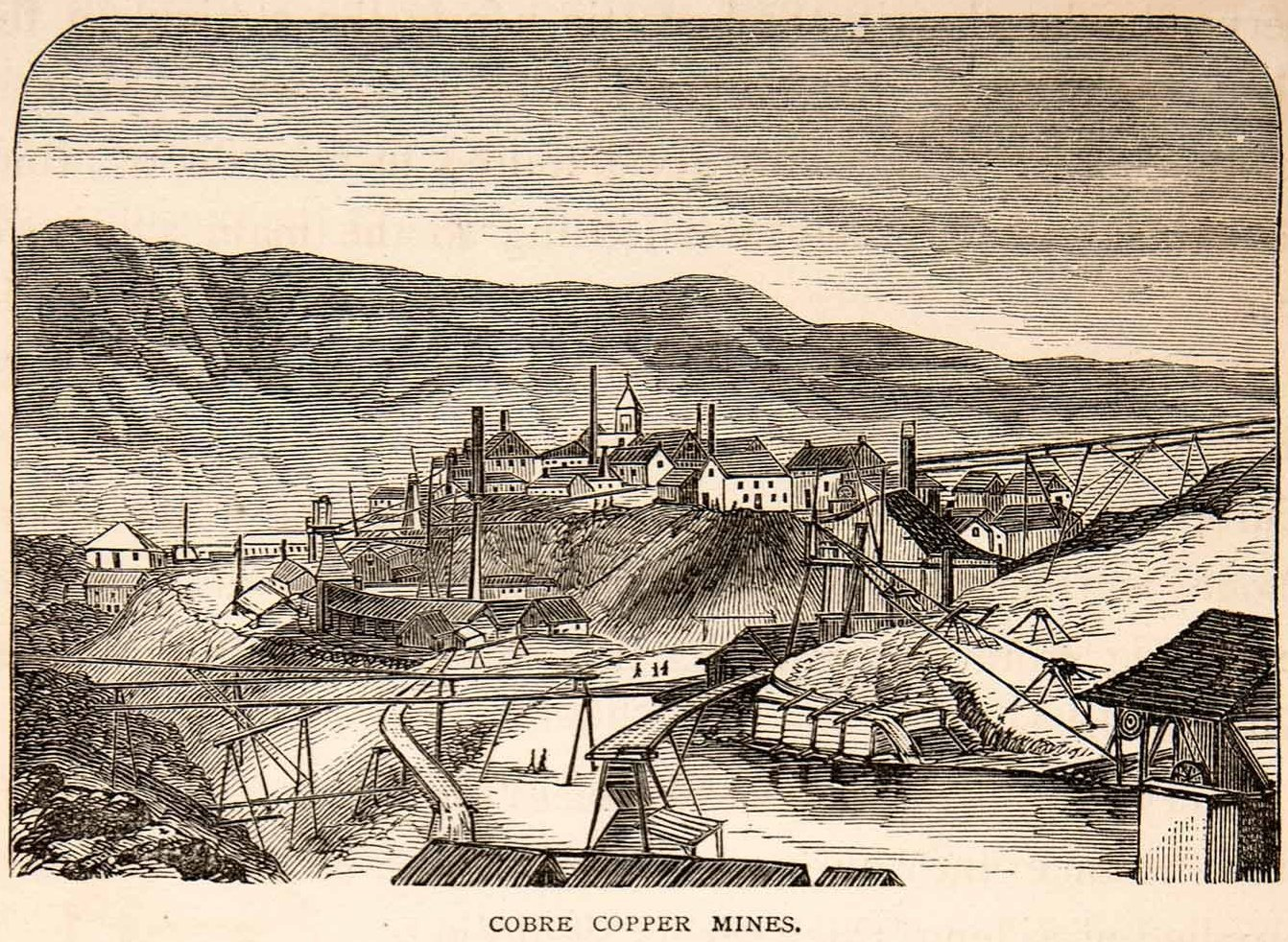
- The mine in 1871

- Location within Cuba

Location
- Location: El Cobre, Cuba, Santiago de Cuba, Cuba; 20°2′44.5″N 75°56′37.5″W

Production
- Products: Copper

The Cobre mine was a copper mine in Cuba, the oldest in the new world. The open pit mine was operated from 1544 to 1998. The Spanish used slave labour and free coloured labour to work the mine. After it had been abandoned, in the 19th century a British company acquired the mine and reopened it, again using slaves and free coloured labourers, but also using skilled Cornish miners and steam engines from Cornwall to operate pumps. The mine was abandoned again, then reopened by an American company at the start of the 20th century. After the Cuban Revolution it was taken over by the state. After being finally abandoned the pit is now filled with a mineral-rich lake.

== Location ==
The El Cobre sulphide deposits occur in the Paleogene volcanic arc along the southeastern coast of Cuba, and are one of the few such deposits in Cuba to have been mined successfully. Almost all the mined ore comes from a central system of cross-cutting veins of pyrite and chalcopyrite. The Cobre Mine is about 12 miles (19 km) north west of Santiago Bay in the Sierra Maestra. It is on a ridge at the top of a valley that runs down to Santiago de Cuba. A range of mountains lies to the south, rising to the 1,940 feet (590 m) Monte Real. The town of El Cobre is on the west slope of the ridge. The town grew up around the mine. The mine was reached by mule train from Punta de Sol until the early 1860s, when a small railway was opened.

== Spanish operations ==
Metal-bearing ores were discovered by the Spanish colonists in Cuba, who thought at first that they had found gold. El Cobre was the first copper mine to be opened by the Spanish colonists, starting operations in 1544. This was the first open pit copper mine in the Americas. The Spanish forced the local indigenous people to work the mine, and imported slaves from Africa. During the first decades of the 17th century copper from the mine, worked by slaves of African origin, was a major source of export revenue. However, the Spanish crown confiscated the mines in 1670 after the private contractor had failed to comply with the terms of his contract and had neglected them for years. 270 private slaves became the property of the king, and the town of El Cobre became a pueblo of king's slaves and free coloured people, a unique type of settlement in Cuba.

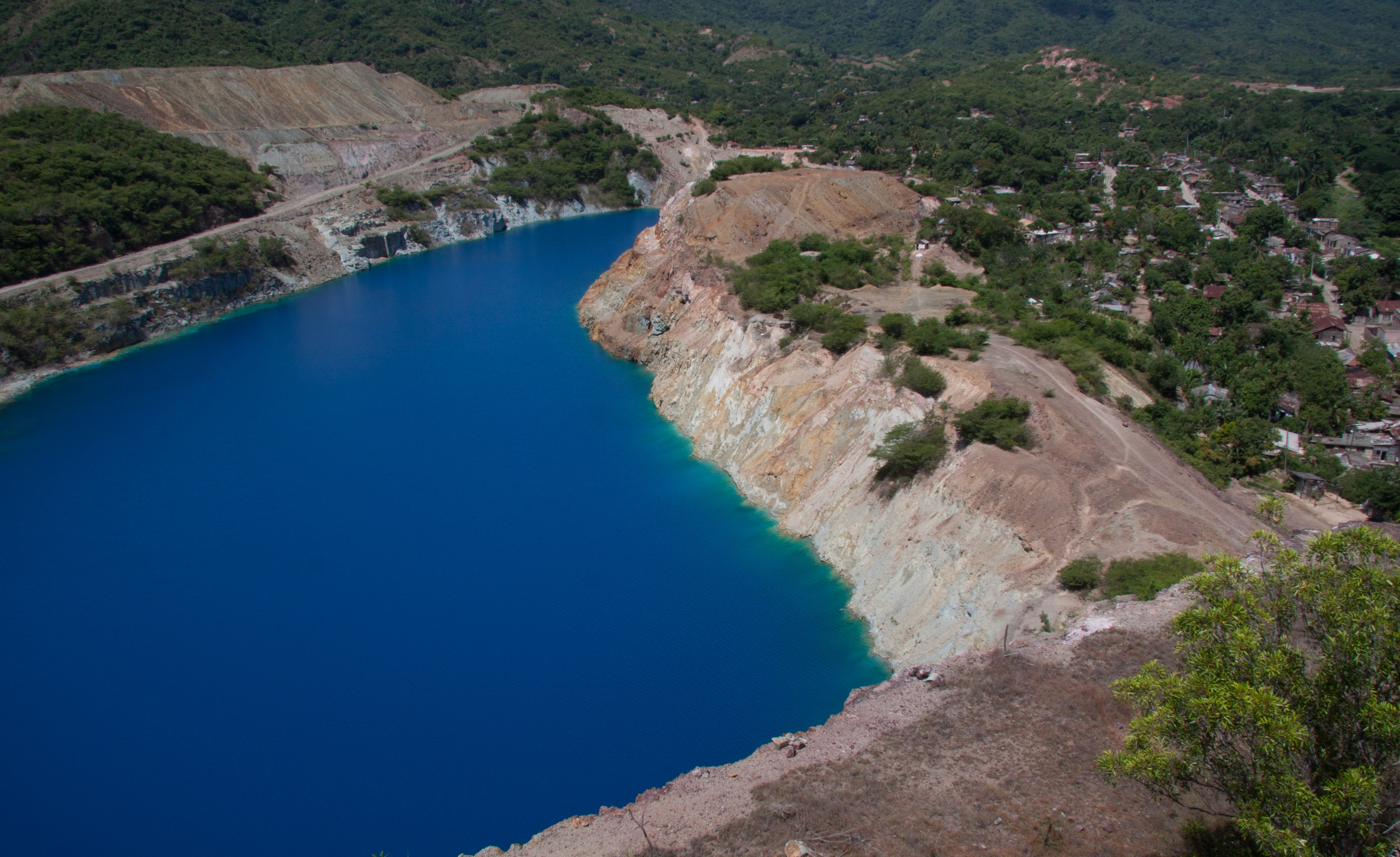
Mining lake of Cobre mine

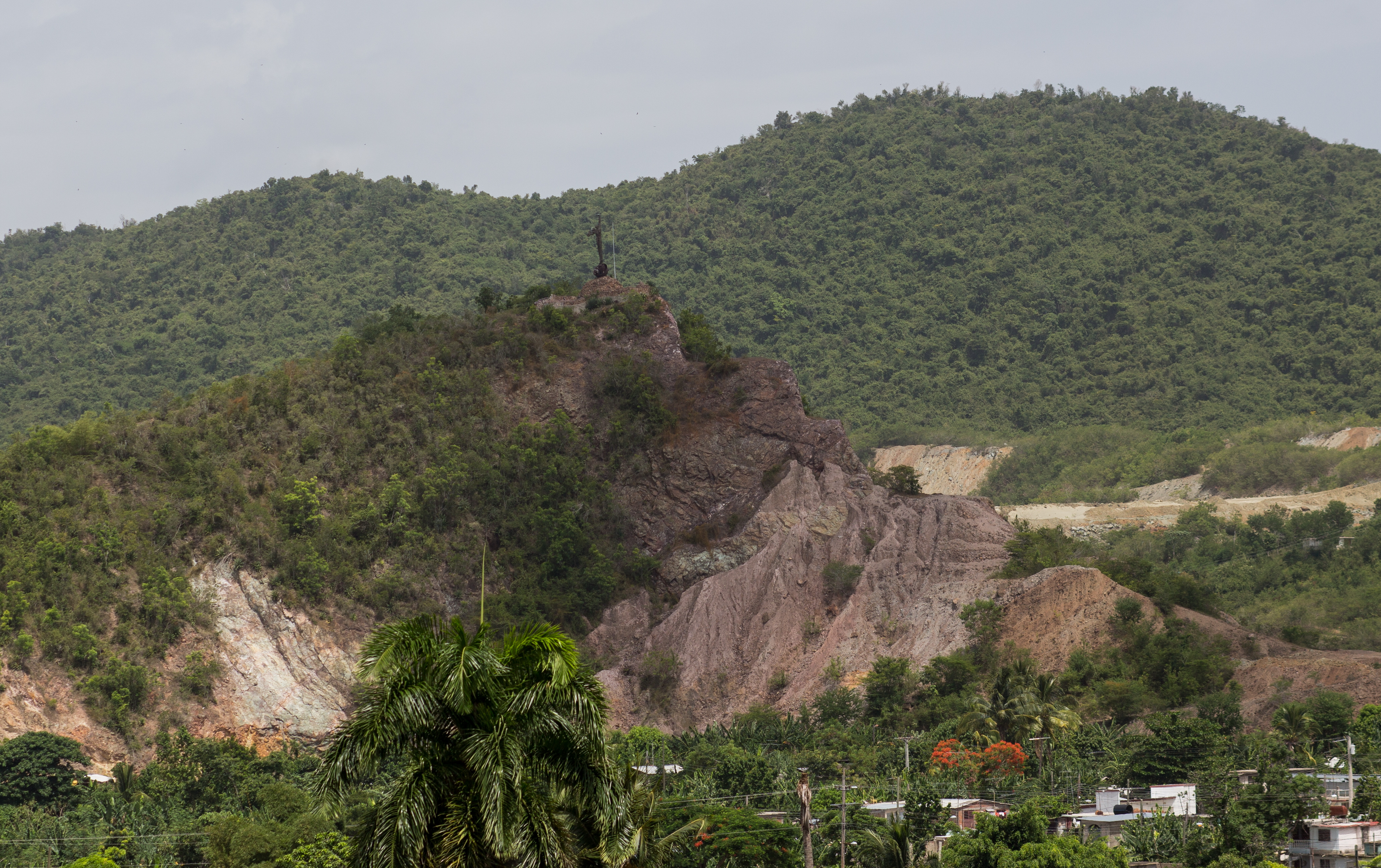
Monumento al Cimarron above the mine

In 1780 an attempt was made to return the mine to private hands and increase production. By that time El Cobre had 1,320 inhabitants, including 64% royal slaves and 34% free coloured people, mostly manumitted descendants of slaves. 2% were the private slaves of the free coloured people. The men were mostly engaged in subsistence agriculture, while mining was mainly undertaken by the women. For much of this period the Cobre mine was the only source of copper on the island, supplying Cuba and sometimes other places in the Caribbean.

== British operations ==
The mines had been abandoned by 1830. Early in the 1830s a British visitor to the region assayed some of the mine's waste and found it rich in copper. The British El Compañía Consolidada de Minas del Cobre (Cobre Mining Company) acquired the mine and reopened it in the early 1830s. An adjacent concession was acquired and opened by the British El Real de Santiago (Royal Santiago Mining Company). Both companies turned to Cornwall for skilled labour and for steam engines to pump out the mines.

Cuba, and the Cobre Mine in particular, was an attractive destination. The pay was good and the handbills circulated in Cornwall hinted that Cuba was a land of opportunity. Between August 1836 and April 1838 Alfred Jenkin, their agent in Cornwall, recruited 136 Cornish miners and mechanics, and also arranged for mining machinery, safety fuses and other material to be shipped from Cornwall to Cuba. He shipped clothes for the West African slaves working in the Cuban mines. Jenkin offered £100 per year plus free lodging, to young, fit, sober and single men, mostly from the mining areas around Camborne, Illogan and Redruth.

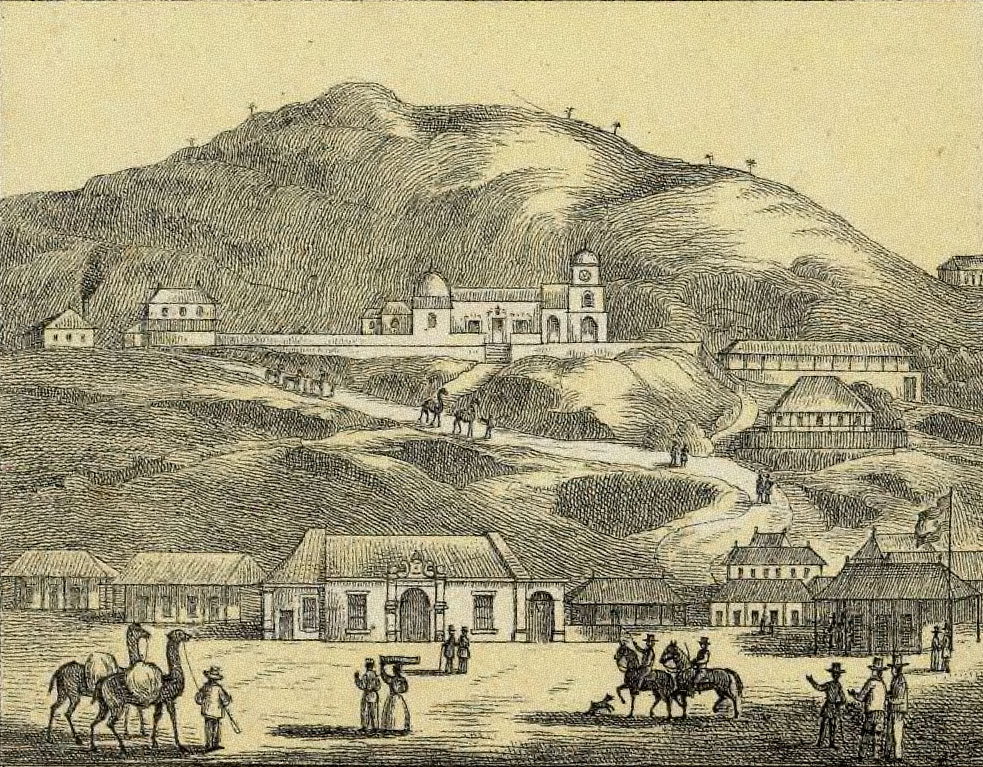
Santuario de El Cobre in 1953

The Cornish miners were sent by sea to Swansea in Wales, from where they took ship to Cuba. They found a hot and humid climate where yellow fever, typhoid fever, smallpox, malaria and other diseases were common. The Cornish workers lived in one-storey adobe wattle houses on the edge of the town near the mines. Insects could enter the houses freely, bringing tropical diseases to which the Cornish had no immunity, particularly yellow fever. Out of one batch of 24 miners who sailed from Cornwall in June 1837, nine had died within six months and others, discharged for sickness, died on the return journey. The range to the south included the 970 feet (300 m) high Hardy's Top, named after John Hardy junior, the British Consul and a director of the Cobre Mining Company. Hardy had a large house built on the top of the mountain that the company later used as a sanatorium.

There was friction with the local authorities. With little to do in their free time, some of the miners turned to drink. Most of the Cornish were Wesleyan Methodists, and wanted to hold services and meetings according to their traditions, but anything other than the Catholic faith was illegal in Cuba. The bibles the company had given to each miner were viewed with suspicion, and the Cornish had to worship in secret. A Protestant burial ground was opened since the Cornish, considered heretics, could not be buried in the Catholic cemetery. After news reached Cornwall about the deaths from fever and higher wages at other mines the number of Cornish recruits dropped. The mine owners brought in hardier workers from the Canary Islands.

At its peak in the first half of the 19th century the mine produced 67,000 tons of copper. John Harvey of Redruth moved with his family to El Cobre in 1855, where he was Mines Engineer and Resident Agent of Mines for 30 years. It appears that the family became Catholic in Cuba. Mining operations were suspended in 1869 when the quality of the ore began to decline, a river dried up that was an essential source of water for the steam engines and for dressing the ore, and rebels damaged the railway during the Ten Years' War between 1868 and 1878. The mine was closed during the Cuban War of Independence (1895–1898).

== Later operations ==
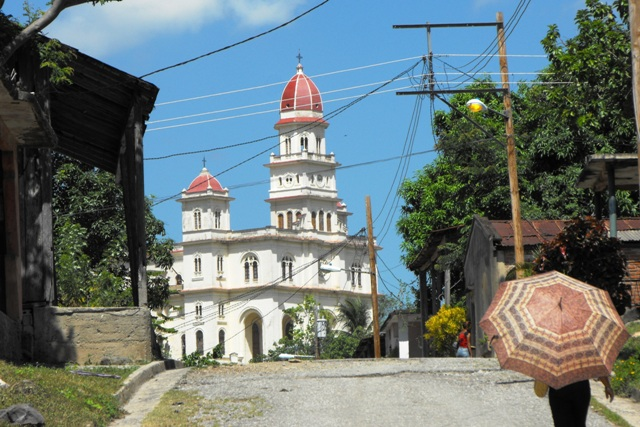
The modern Basílica Santuario Nacional de Nuestra Señora de la Caridad del Cobre

In 1902, the mine was purchased by William A. Chanler, a wealthy New York businessman and a veteran of the Spanish–American War. Profits were initially robust enough that Chanler was able to loan $35 million to the Cuban government. The company used some Cornish labour, and managed to drain much of the pit. However, the water-saturated land around the pit was not secured and the mine collapsed. The church of Señora de la Caridad was destroyed in the landslide.

In the period up to the end of World War I (1914–18) the copper was mostly extracted by labourers from Spain and shipped to the United States. Companies active in the mines were La San José Copper Mines and Ferrocarril del Cobre, The Copper Mines, Copper Company and the Cuba Leasing Company. After the war, operations were greatly reduced. From 1920 to 1940 operations revived slightly. In the 1940s a processing plant was built. Investors included Roberto Gómez Cabrera, owner of Rogoca Minera. S. A., which continued extracting ore until the end of the Cuban Revolution (1953–59).

After the revolution the mines were nationalised. A school was established to train mining technicians, more mechanisation was introduced in the extraction process, a geological survey was undertaken and a new processing plant installed. The copper was mainly sold to socialist countries. In the 1980s the mine employed over 200 people and produced 1,500 tons annually. The peak production was 1,513 tons in 1986. Depletion of the ore forced deeper and more expensive extraction, and this combined with falling copper prices led to the decision to close the mine in 2001.

From the time mining began in 1544 to the end of operations in 1998 over 3 million tonnes of ore were extracted, with grades of 2% to 20% copper. Nickel and cobalt were also extracted from El Cobre.

== Recent years ==
The mine was formally closed in 2001, laying off 325 workers. The quarry filled with water, which is high in minerals, particularly sulphur. The lake has over 4,000,000 cubic metres (5,200,000 yd^{3}) water, and is about 1,000 by 800 metres (3,300 by 2,600 ft) and 60 metres (200 ft) deep. A large number of galleries and tunnels of considerable lengths and depths remain. A draft plan for environmental rehabilitation was issued on 6 July 2002. It covered stabilisation of the quarry, studies of water quality, covering industrial waste with topsoil, planting grasses and reforestation, for a total cost of US$243,000. Today the town is mainly known for the Basílica Santuario Nacional de Nuestra Señora de la Caridad del Cobre, the Sanctuary of the Virgin of Charity.

== Sources ==
- Castillo, Guillermo Perez del (January 2006), "The Harvey Family in El Cobre" (PDF), Revista, vol. 15, Salt Lake City, Utah: Cuban Genealogical Society
- "Cobre", The Cornish in Latin America, University of Exeter
- Díaz, María Elena (2006), "Mining Women, Royal Slaves: Copper Mining in Colonial Cuba, 1670–1780", Mining Women: Gender in the Development of a Global Industry, 1670 to 2005, Palgrave Macmillan US, pp. 21–39, doi:10.1007/978-1-349-73399-6_2, ISBN 978-1-349-73399-6
- "El Cobre mine might become Santiago de Cuba tourist attraction", Havana Journal, archived from the original on September 30, 2006
- Payton, Philip (2005), The Cornish Overseas: A History of Cornwall's 'great Emigration', Dundurn, ISBN 978-1-904880-04-2
- Russell, Norman; Moreira, Jesús; Sánchez, Roberto, Volcanogenic massive sulphide deposits of cuba. (PDF), Inst. de geología y paleontología, Havana, Cuba
- Solomon, Daniel F. (2011-02-08), Breaking Up with Cuba: The Dissolution of Friendly Relations Between Washington and Havana, 1956–1961, McFarland, ISBN 978-0-7864-8013-5
- Thomas, Lately (1971), The Astor Orphans: A Pride of Lions, W. Morrow, ISBN 978-1881324034
- "Town and Mine of El Cobre", Slavery and Remembrance, The Colonial Williamsburg Foundation
