= Santiago de Cuba =

- Municipality
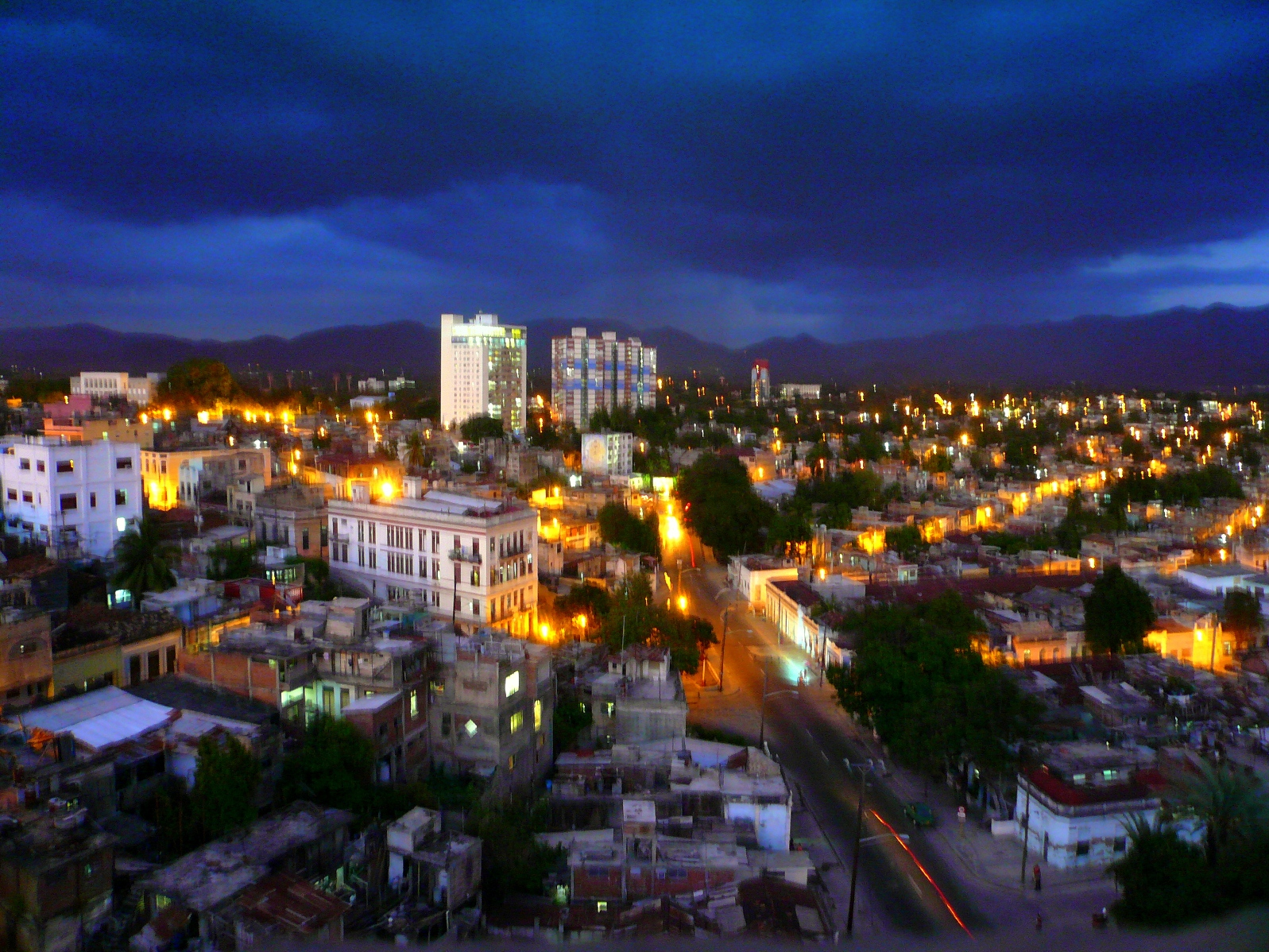
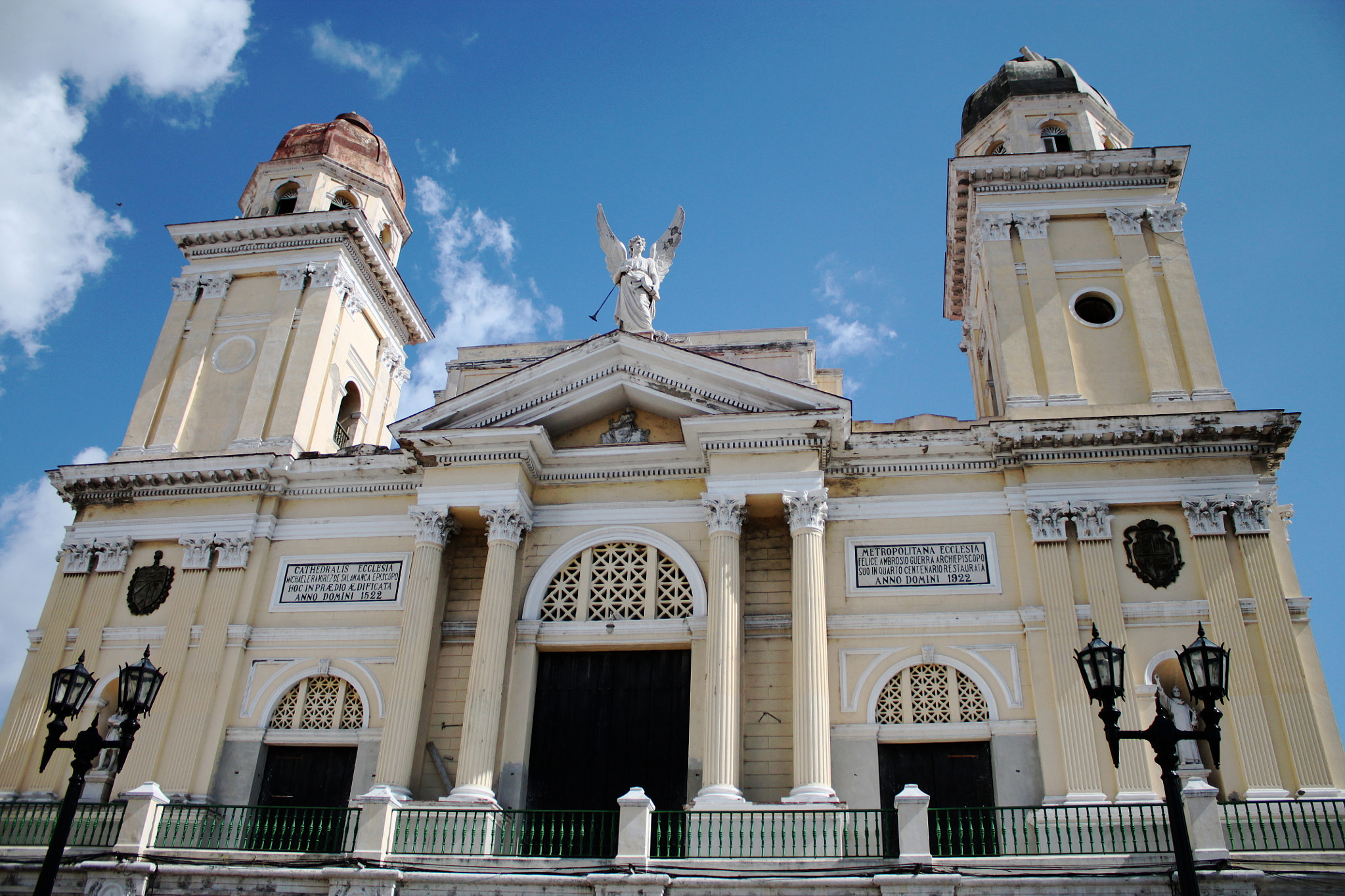
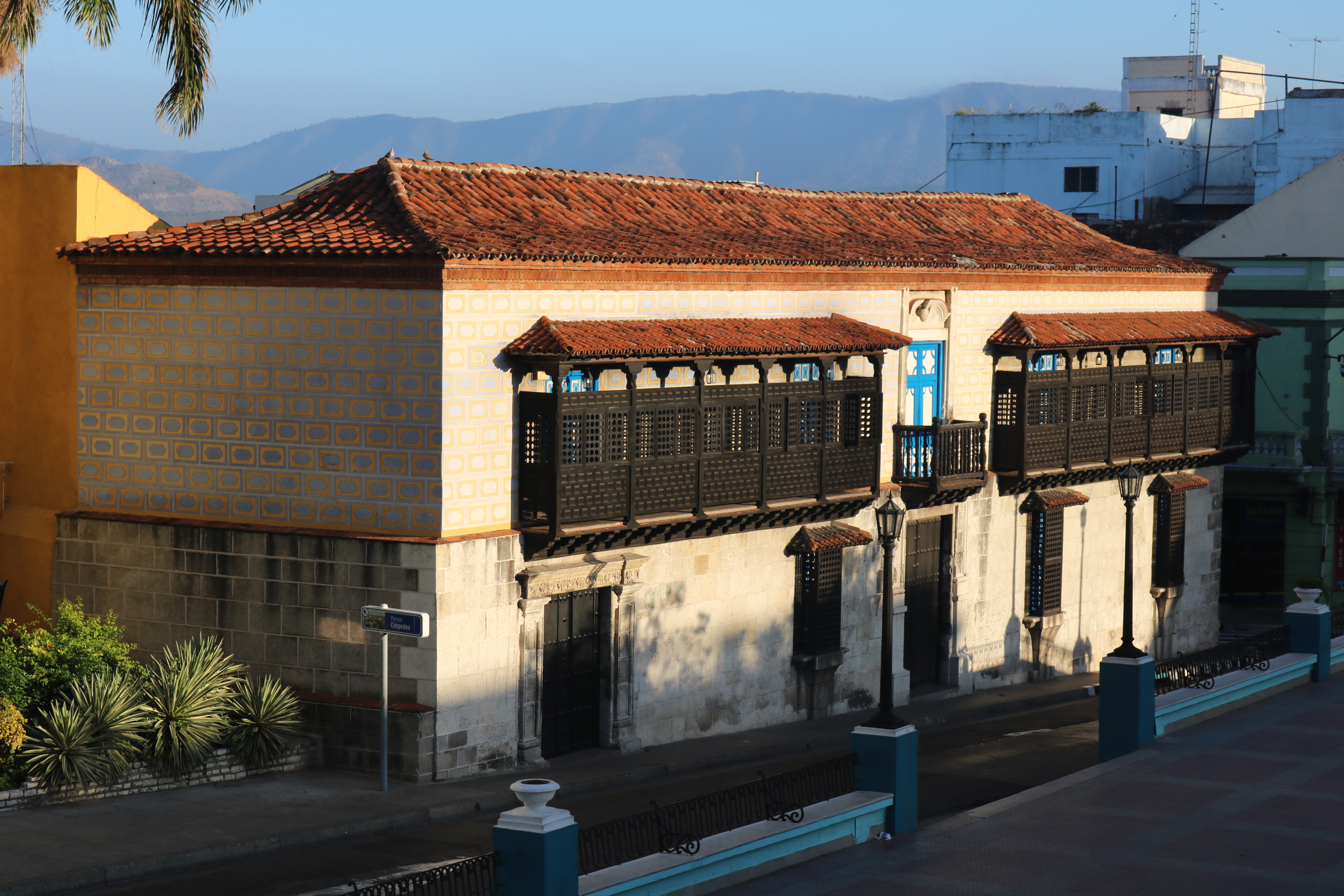
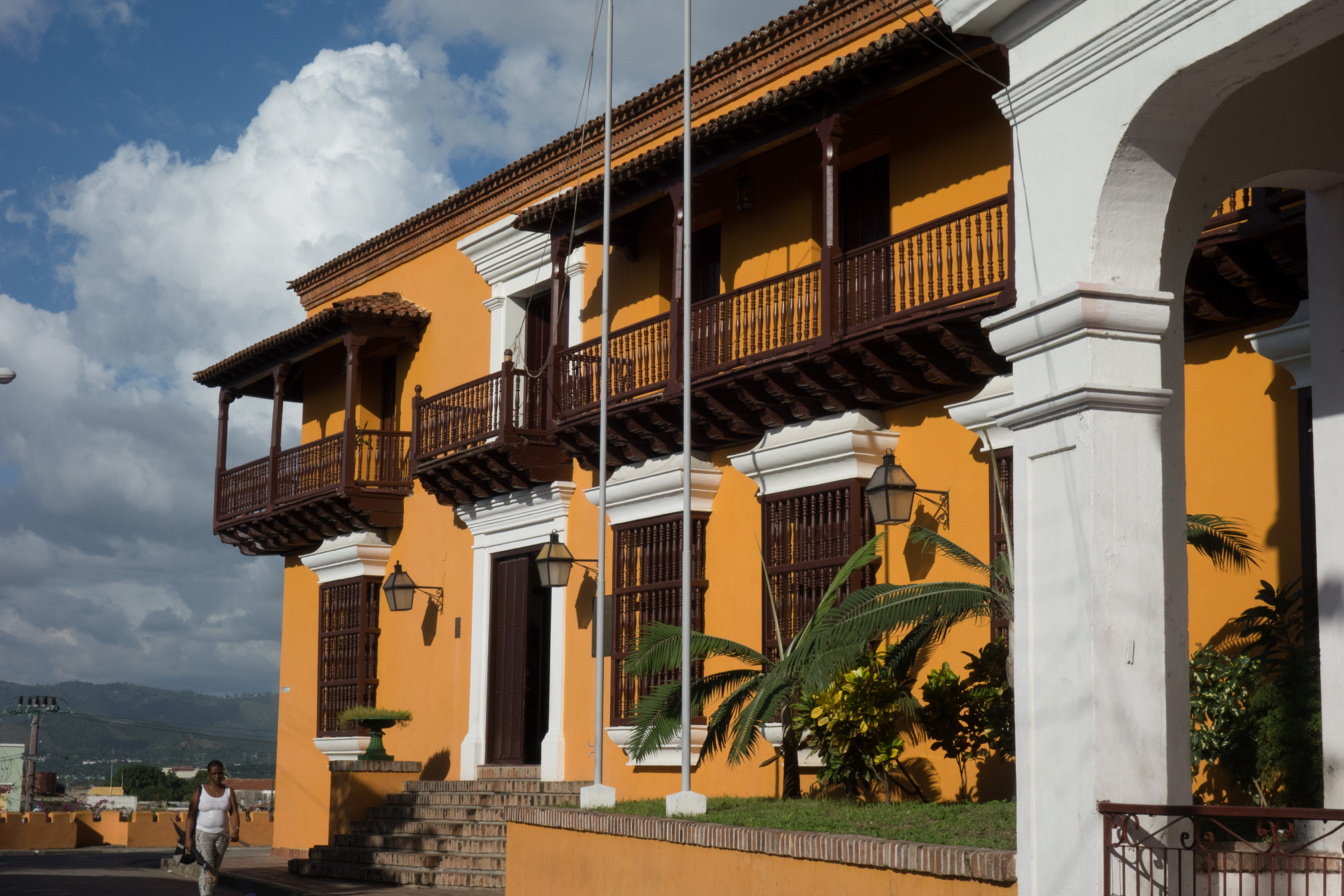
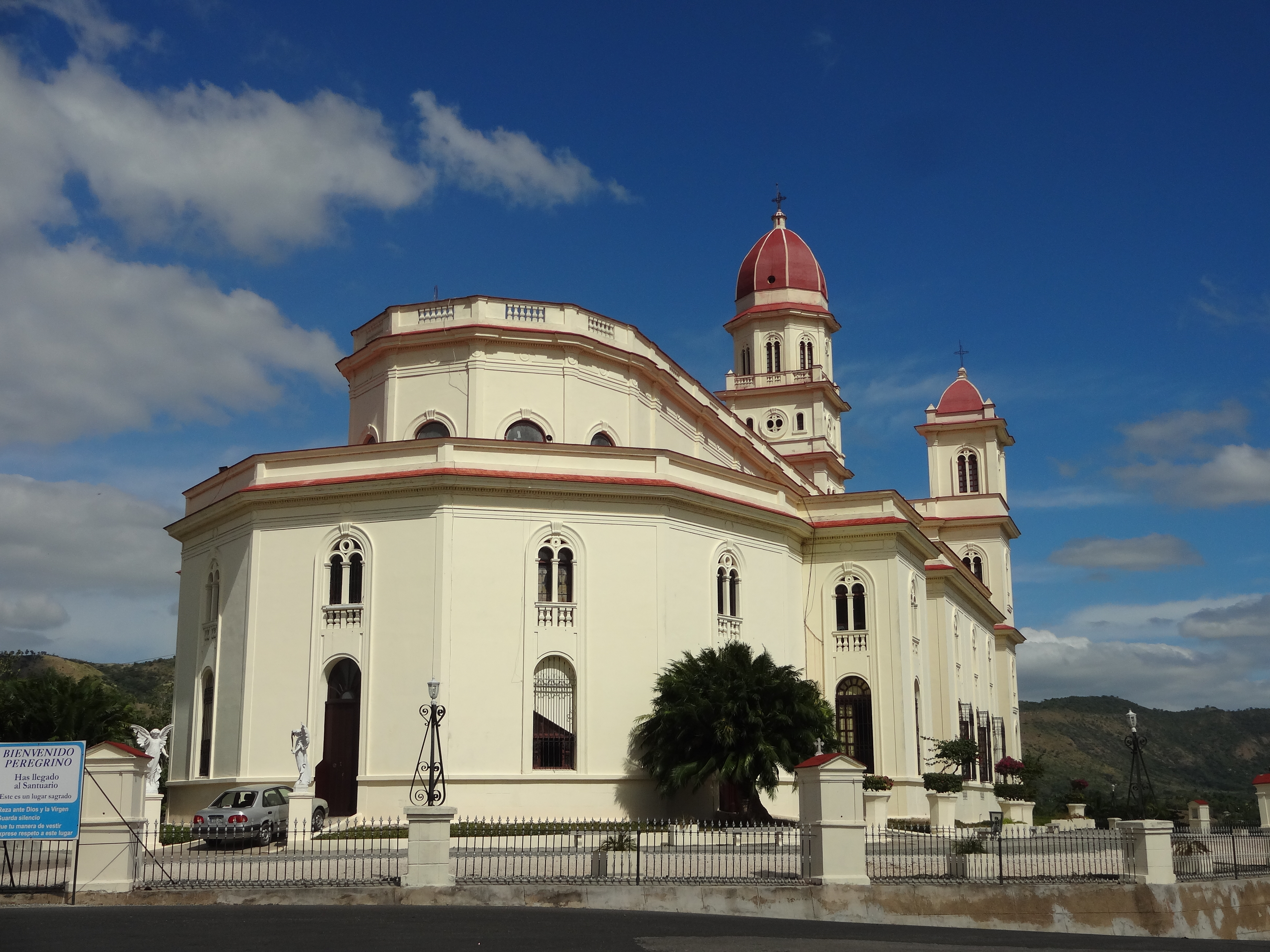
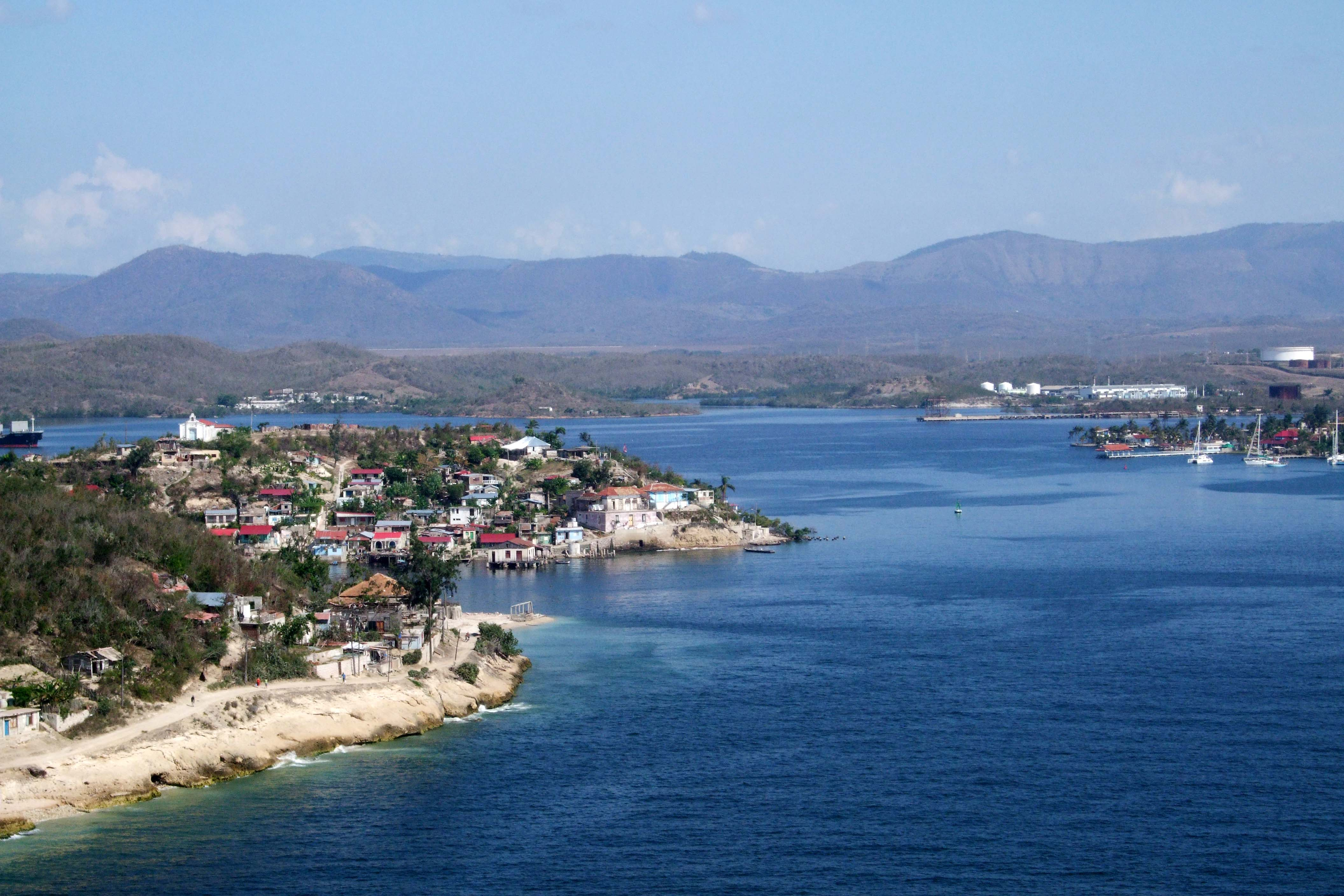
- Night skyline Cathedral Basilica of Santiago de Cuba Casa de Diego Velázquez Museo de la Lucha Clandestina Basílica del Cobre Cayo Granma

- Flag Seal
- Motto: Rebelde ayer, hospitalaria hoy, heroica siempre (Spanish) ("Rebellious yesterday, hospitable today, always heroic")
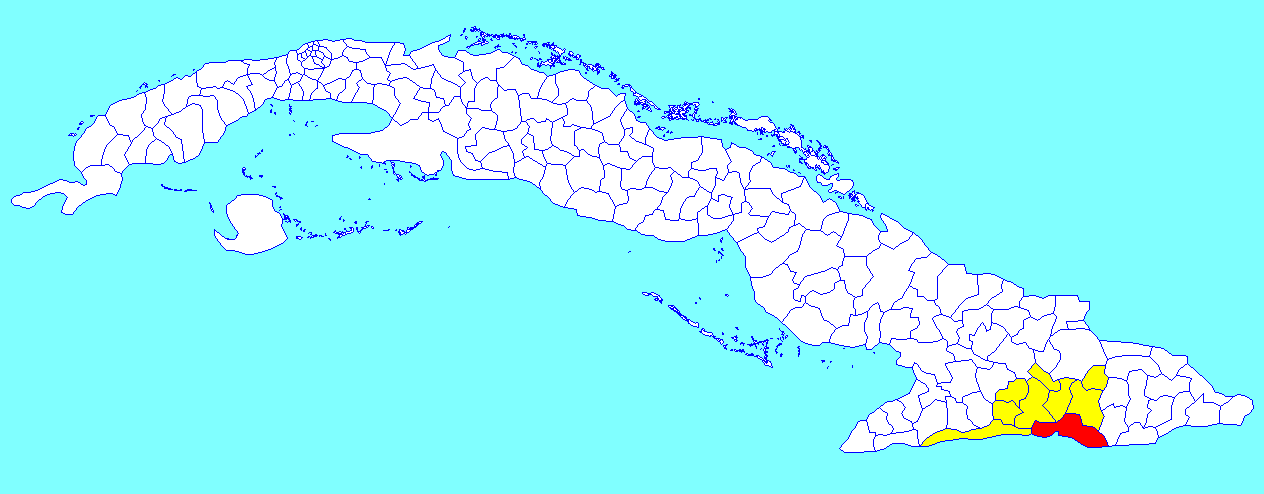
- Santiago municipality (red) within Santiago Province (yellow) and Cuba
- Coordinates: 20°01′18″N 75°49′46″W
- Country: Cuba
- Province: Santiago de Cuba
- Established: 1515
- Founder: Diego Velázquez de Cuéllar

Government
  - Mayor: Yaneydis Batista Hechavarría

Area
  - Municipality: 1,023 km^{2} (395 sq mi)
  - Urban: 65.79 km^{2} (25.40 sq mi)
- Elevation: 82 m (269 ft)

Population (2022)
  - Municipality: 507,167
  - Rank: 2nd in Cuba
  - Urban: 451,528
  - Urban density: 6,863/km^{2} (17,780/sq mi)
  - Rural: 55,639
  - Seat: 443,006
- Demonym: santiaguero/a

GDP (PPP, constant 2015 values)
  - Year: 2023
  - Total: $6.2 billion
  - Per capita: $14,000
- Area code: +53 22
- Website: santiaguero.gob.cu

Santiago de Cuba (Spanish pronunciation: [sanˈtjaɣo ðe ˈkuβa]) is the second-largest city in Cuba and the capital city of Santiago de Cuba Province. It lies in the southeastern part of the island, some 870 km (540 mi) southeast of the Cuban capital of Havana.

The municipality covers an area of 1,023.8 km^{2} (395.3 sq mi), some communities in it include 26 de Julio, Abel Santamaría, Antonio Maceo, Bravo, Castillo Duany, Daiquirí, El Caney, El Cobre, El Cristo, Guilera, Leyte Vidal, Moncada and Siboney.

Historically, Santiago de Cuba has been the second-most important city on the island after Havana, and remains the second-largest. It lies on a bay connected to the Caribbean Sea and is an important sea port. In 2022, the city of Santiago de Cuba recorded a population of 507,167 people.

== History ==
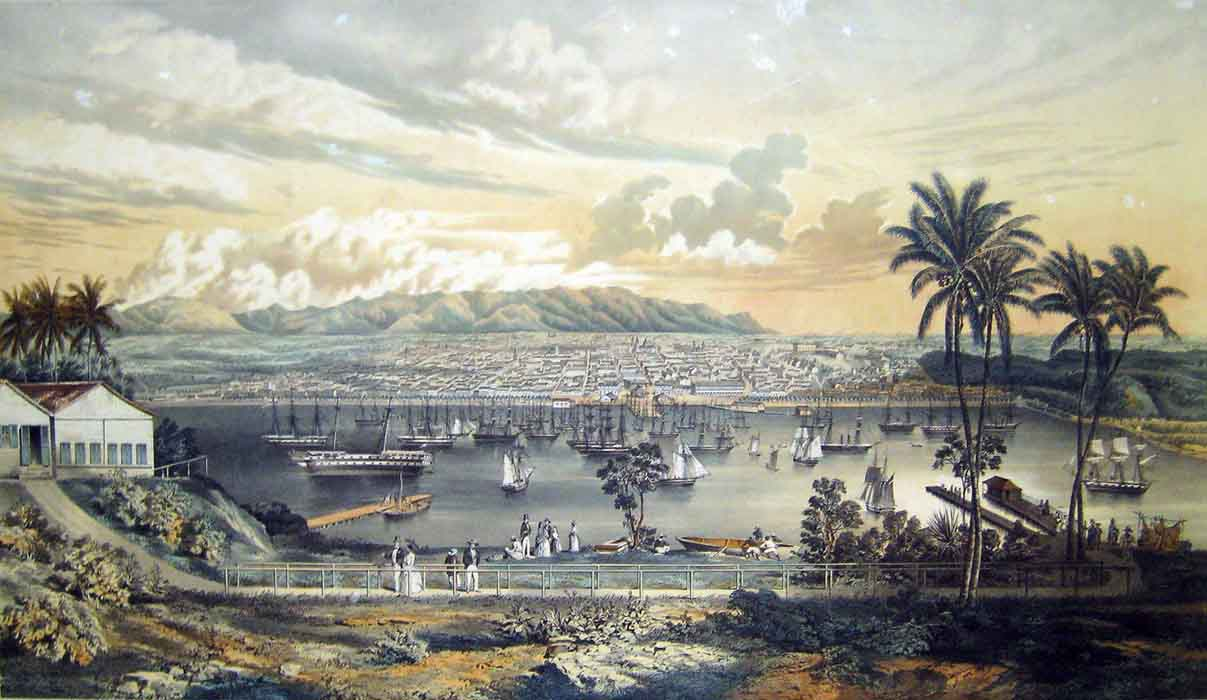
Santiago de Cuba in 1856 by Edouard Laplante and Leonardo Barañano. Firestone Library, Princeton University.

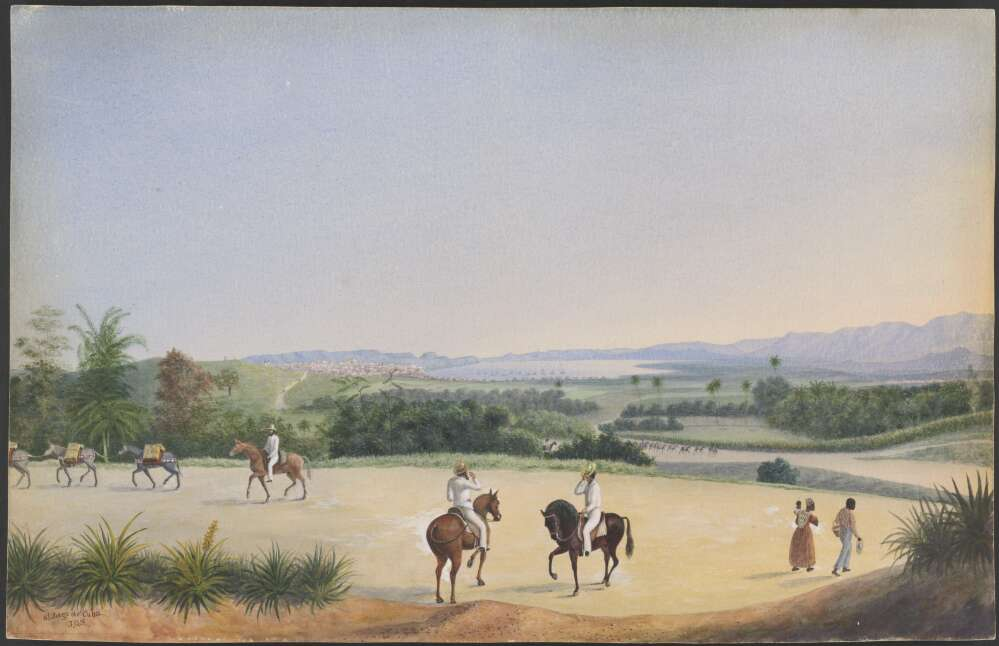
1859 watercolor of Santiago de Cuba's plains by British geologist James Gay Sawkins

Santiago de Cuba was the seventh village founded by Spanish conquistador Diego Velázquez de Cuéllar on 25 July 1515. The settlement was destroyed by fire in 1516, and was immediately rebuilt. This was the starting point of the expeditions led by Juan de Grijalba and Hernán Cortés to the coasts of Mexico in 1518, and in 1538 by Hernando de Soto's expedition to Florida. The first cathedral was built in the city in 1528. From 1522 until 1589, Santiago was the capital of the Spanish colony of Cuba.

The city was plundered by French forces in 1553, and by English forces in 1603. More than 50 years later the English raided again in 1662 under Christopher Myngs.

The city had a huge influx of French and British immigrants in the late-18th and early-19th centuries. Some eighteen thousand Saint Dominican refugees, both ethnic French whites and free people of color, and African freedmen, came from Saint-Domingue in the summer of 1803 during the last days of the Haitian slave revolt, which had started in 1791. Other refugees had emigrated from Saint-Domingue earlier in the revolution. Haiti declared its independence as a republic in 1804.

The French were withdrawing surviving troops after suffering heavy losses from warfare and yellow fever. The immigrants, who included freedmen as France had abolished slavery on Saint-Domingue, struggled to maintain their freedom in Cuba, which was still a slave society. Cuba initially allowed only white refugees, women of color, children, and loyal "domestics" to land; French troops and all men of color over the age of thirteen were held off shore, to be rapidly deported to the mainland, as they were considered a revolutionary threat. Some French soldiers joined other refugees in Charleston, South Carolina, or New York City; others went to New Orleans.

The refugees who stayed added to the city's eclectic cultural mix, already rich with Spanish and African culture. Some of the women and children were impressed into slavery again, although they had been free. In 1809, after Napoleon Bonaparte's forces invaded Spain, French citizens were ordered out of Cuba. Most went to the United States, and thousands settled in New Orleans, with the freedmen increasing its African culture, as most had been born in Africa. The ethnic French whites and free people of color, generally with longer ties to French culture, added their flavor to the culture of the city as well.

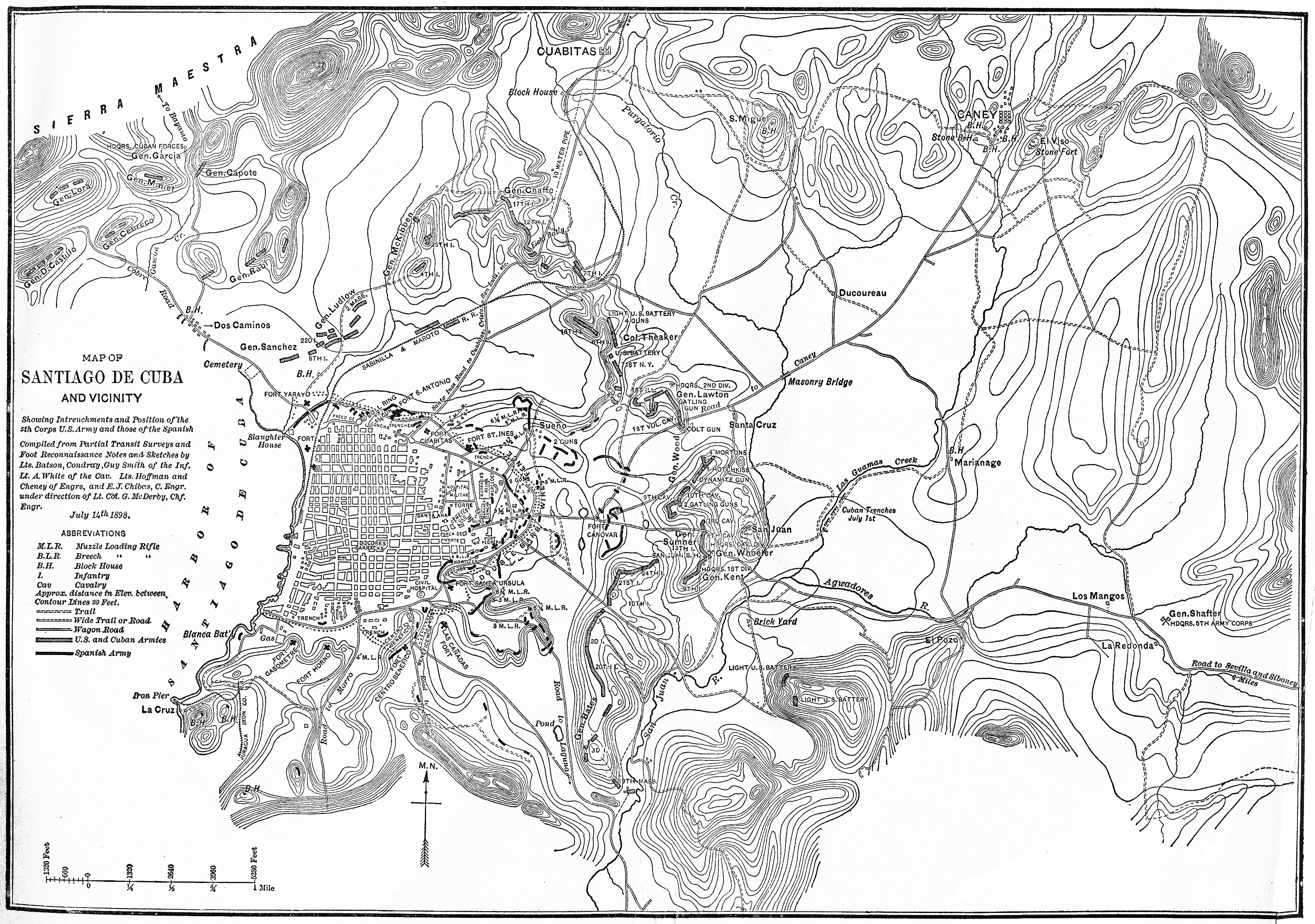
Map of Santiago de Cuba, 1898

Near the end of the century, during the Spanish–American War, Santiago was the site of the major defeat of Spanish troops at San Juan Hill on 1 July 1898. After capturing the surrounding hills, United States General William Rufus Shafter laid siege to the city. Spain later surrendered to the United States after Admiral William T. Sampson destroyed the Spanish Atlantic fleet just outside Santiago's harbor on 3 July 1898. Cuba had declared independence from Spain but was occupied by US troops for several years. Historians suggest they were there to ensure the sugar economy continued to be productive.

José Martí, a Cuban poet, writer, and national hero, is buried in Santa Ifigenia Cemetery in this city.

=== Role in the Cuban Revolution ===
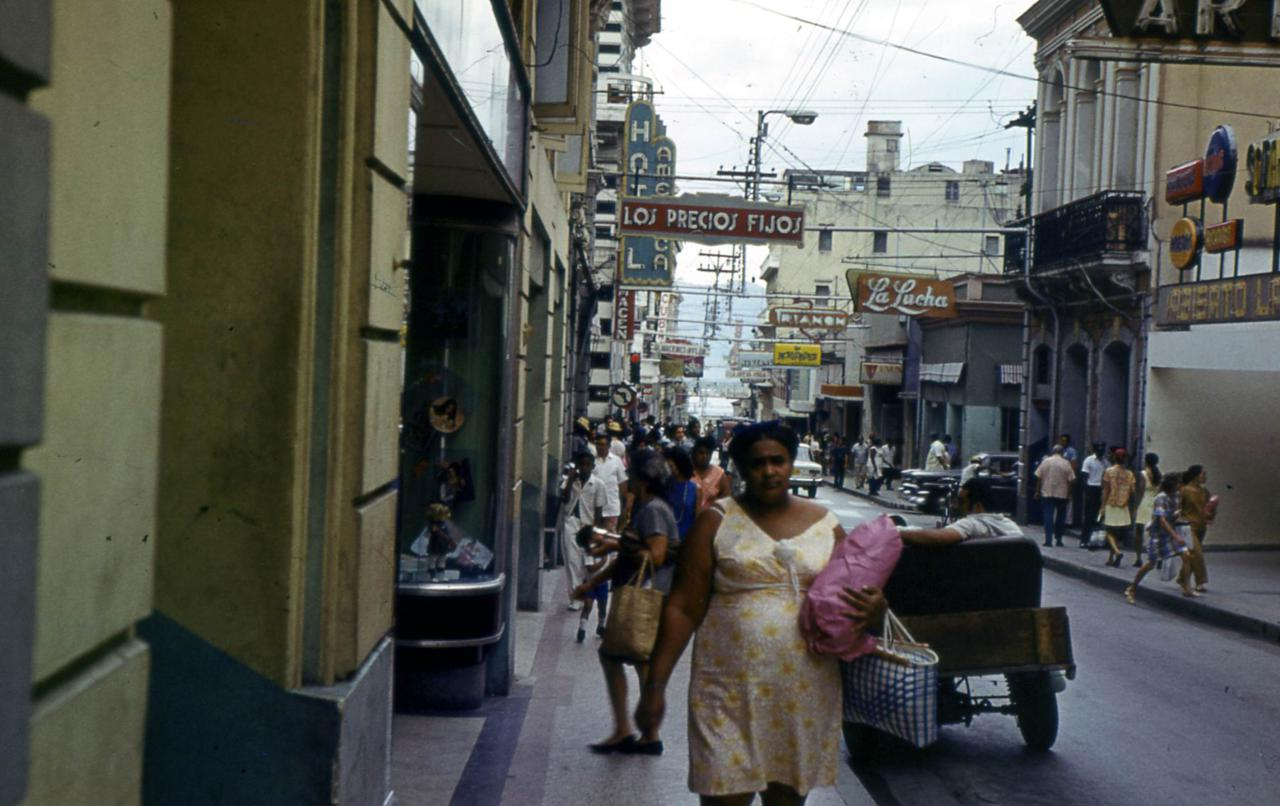
Street in central Santiago in 1974

Santiago was the home of the 20th-century revolutionary hero Frank País. On 26 July 1953, the Cuban Revolution began with an ill-prepared armed attack on the Moncada Barracks by a small contingent of rebels led by Fidel Castro. Shortly after this disastrous incident, País began talking with students and young working people informally, drawing around him what became an extremely effective urban revolutionary alliance. He and his followers developed highly organized cells, coordinating a large-scale urban resistance that became instrumental in the success of the Cuban Revolution.

País' group prepared carefully, accruing weapons, collecting money and medical supplies. They published a cheap newsletter that reported news critical of the government, attempting to counter Batista's censorship of the mainline press.

In the summer of 1955, País's organization merged with Castro's 26 July Movement. País became the leader of the new organization in Oriente province. Two years later he was betrayed to the police and was fatally shot after his capture.

On 1 January 1959, Fidel Castro proclaimed the victory of the Cuban Revolution from a balcony on Santiago de Cuba's city hall. The ashes of País were interred in Santa Ifigenia Cemetery, where Marti had been buried.

== Culture ==
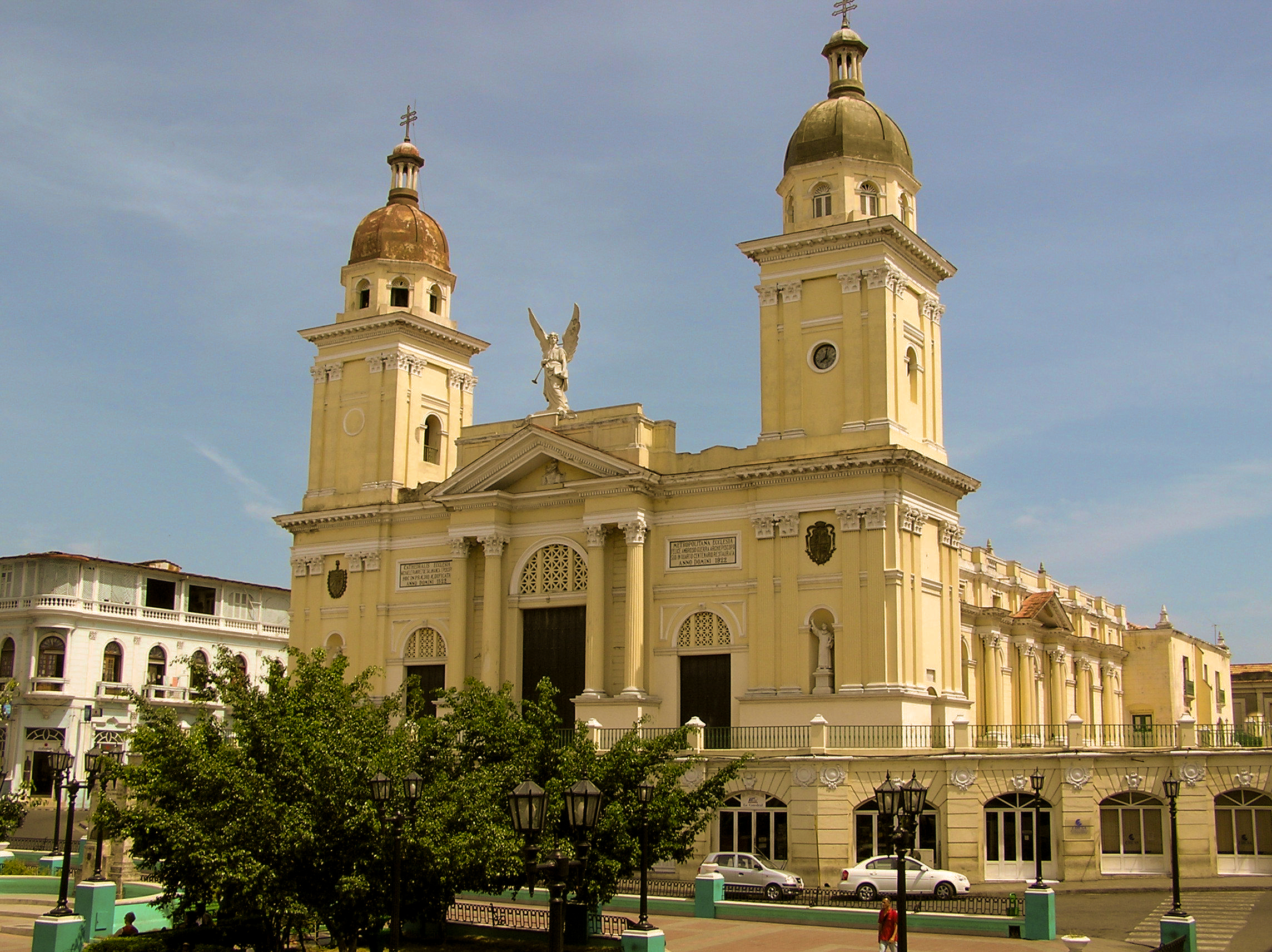
Cathedral Basilica of Santiago de Cuba

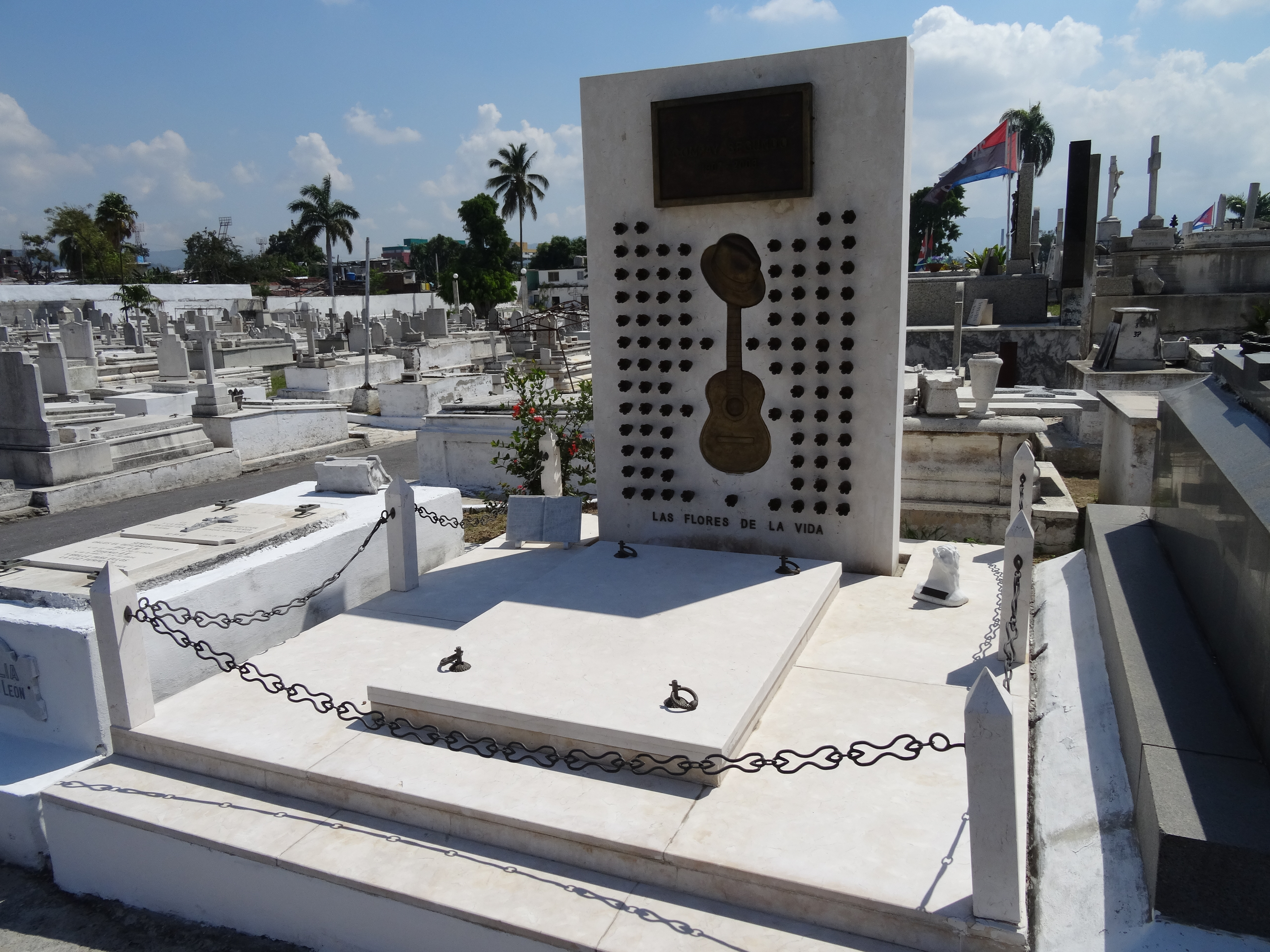
The tomb of Compay Segundo

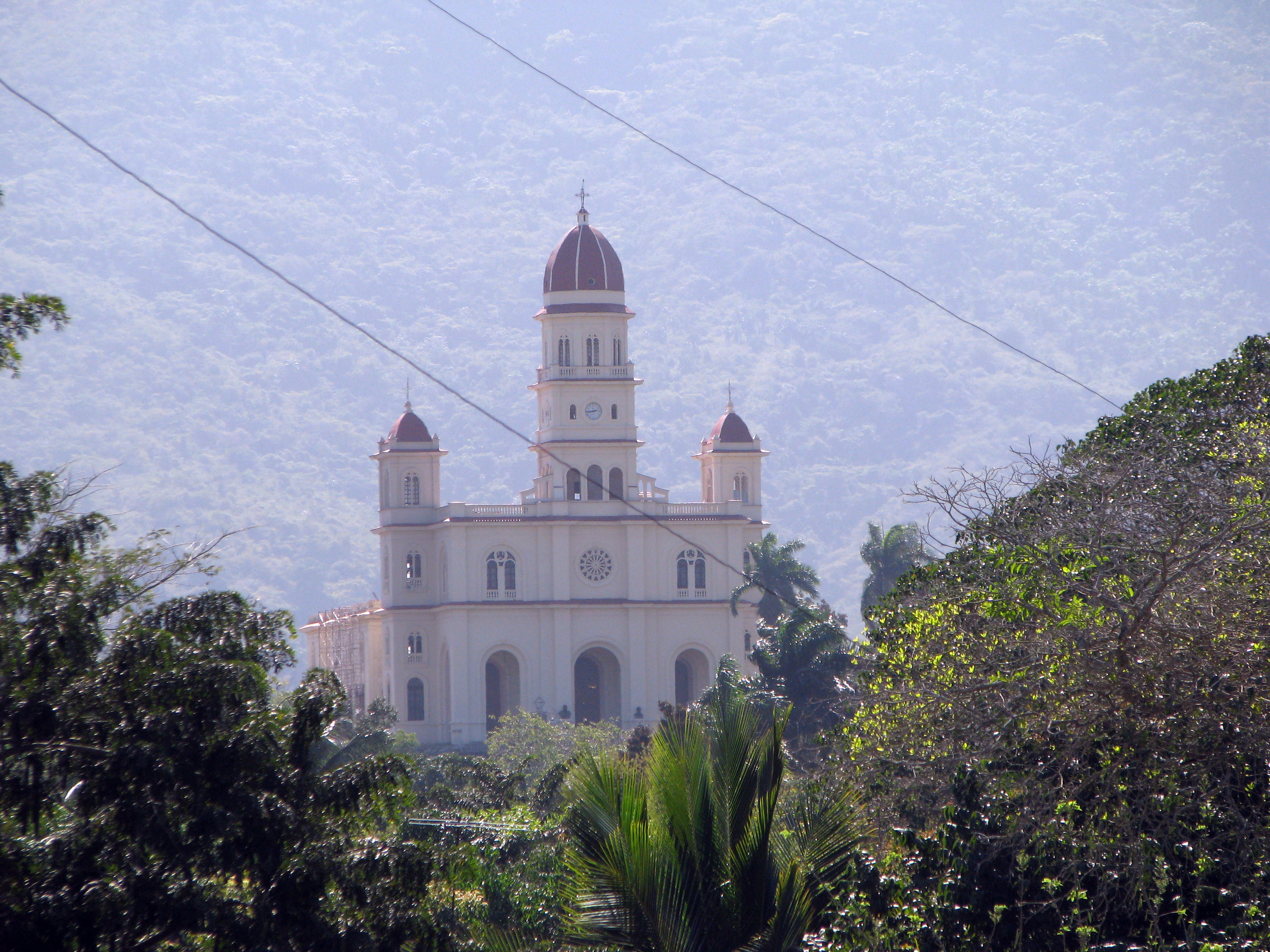
The National Sanctuary of the Charity del Cobre houses the Virgin of Charity del Cobre which is the Catholic Patroness of the island of Cuba.

Santiago de Cuba was the hometown of poet José María Heredia. The Teatro Heredia, which hosts theater and cultural events, is named in his honor. The mural relief portrait on the building façade depicts Juan Almeida Bosque, a commander of insurgent forces in the Cuban Revolution.

It is the birthplace of the world-famous Bacardi brand, which was started by Facundo Bacardi Masso in 1862. It now houses a museum that displays the extensive art collection of the Bacardí family.

Santiago de Cuba is well known for its cultural life. Some of Cuba's most famous musicians, including Compay Segundo, Ibrahim Ferrer and Eliades Ochoa (all of whom participated in the film Buena Vista Social Club) and trova composer Ñico Saquito (Benito Antonio Fernández Ortiz) were born in the city or in one of the villages surrounding it. They have contributed to the typical, country-like music of the city.

Santiago de Cuba is well known for its traditional music, most notably son, from which salsa has been derived. The city celebrates Carnival in July, although it typically precedes Lent. With the city preoccupied with the holiday, Castro chose 26 July to enter undetected into the city to assault the Moncada Barracks. During Carnival, traditional conga music is played in the streets on a traditional pentatonic trumpet, called the trompeta china.

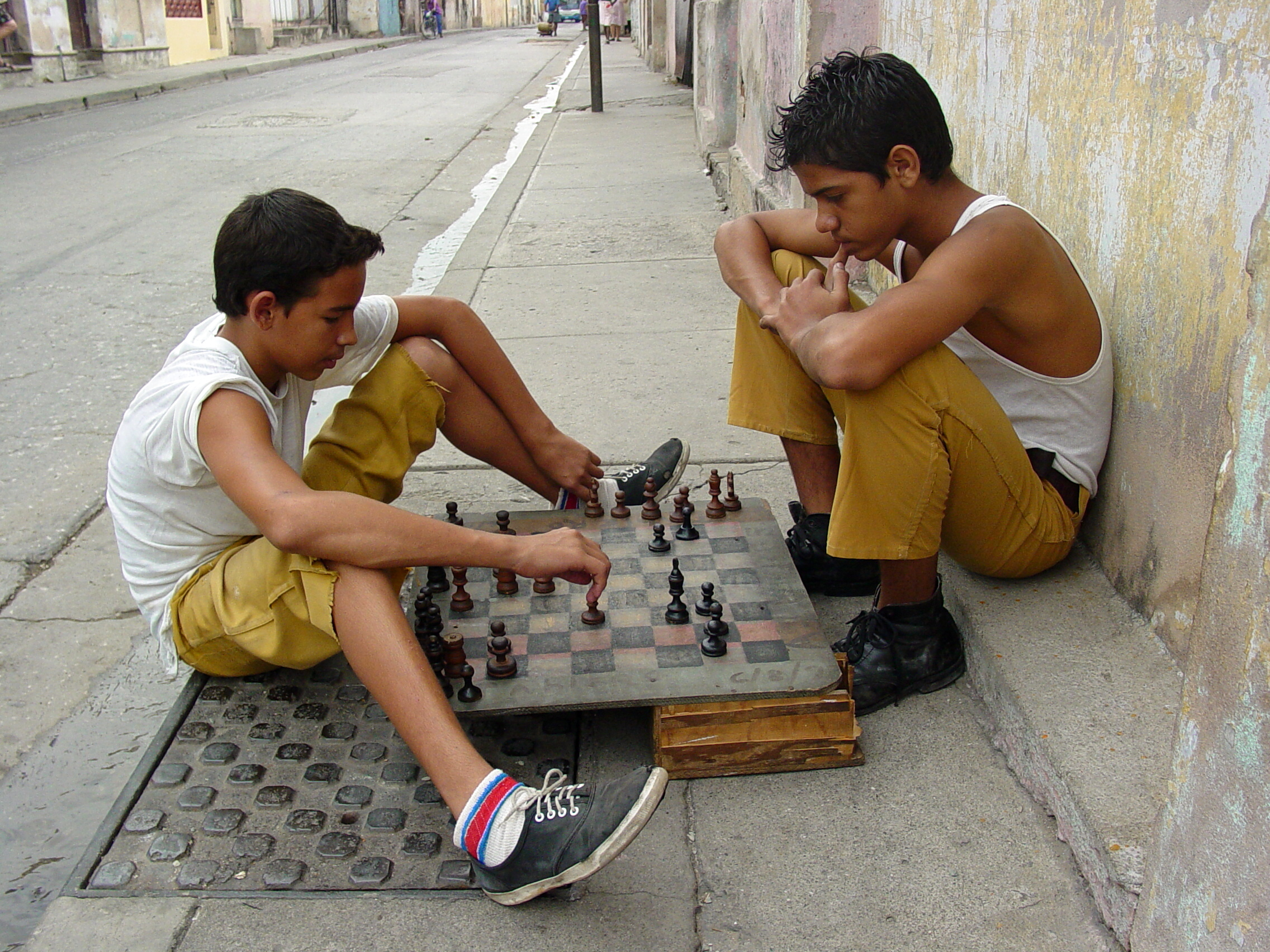
Boys playing chess

A relatively high number of residents of the city adhere to Afro-Cuban religions, most notably santería. The city hosts an important community of descendants of immigrants from the early 19th century from what is now Haiti. Some aspects of the religious "vodún" heritage of the city can be traced back to this community.

The city features several historic architectural styles, from Baroque to neoclassical. Many colonial buildings have huge windows and balconies, where people can enjoy views of the steep streets and wooded hills. Preserved historical treasures include the first Spanish dwelling in the Americas, the first cathedral in Cuba, Cobre mine, the first copper mine opened in the Americas; and the first Cuban museum.

=== World Heritage Site ===
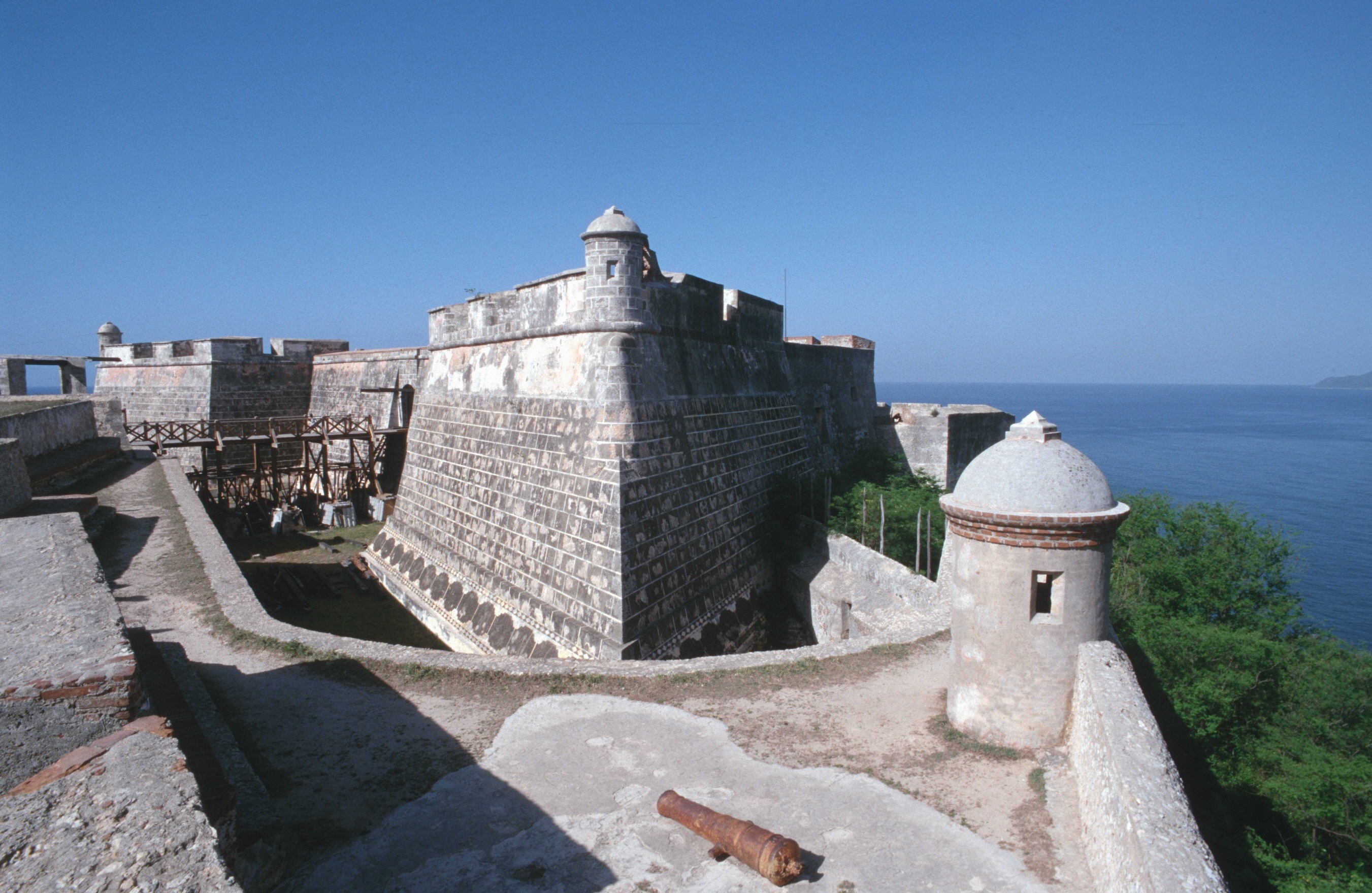
Castillo de San Pedro de la Roca in Santiago, a UNESCO World Heritage Site

The local citadel of San Pedro de la Roca is inscribed on the UNESCO World Heritage List as "the most complete, best-preserved example of Spanish-American military architecture, based on Italian and Renaissance design principles".

=== World Heritage Biosphere Reserve ===
The Baconao Park was inscribed on the UNESCO World Heritage Biosphere Reserve List in 1987.

== Geography ==
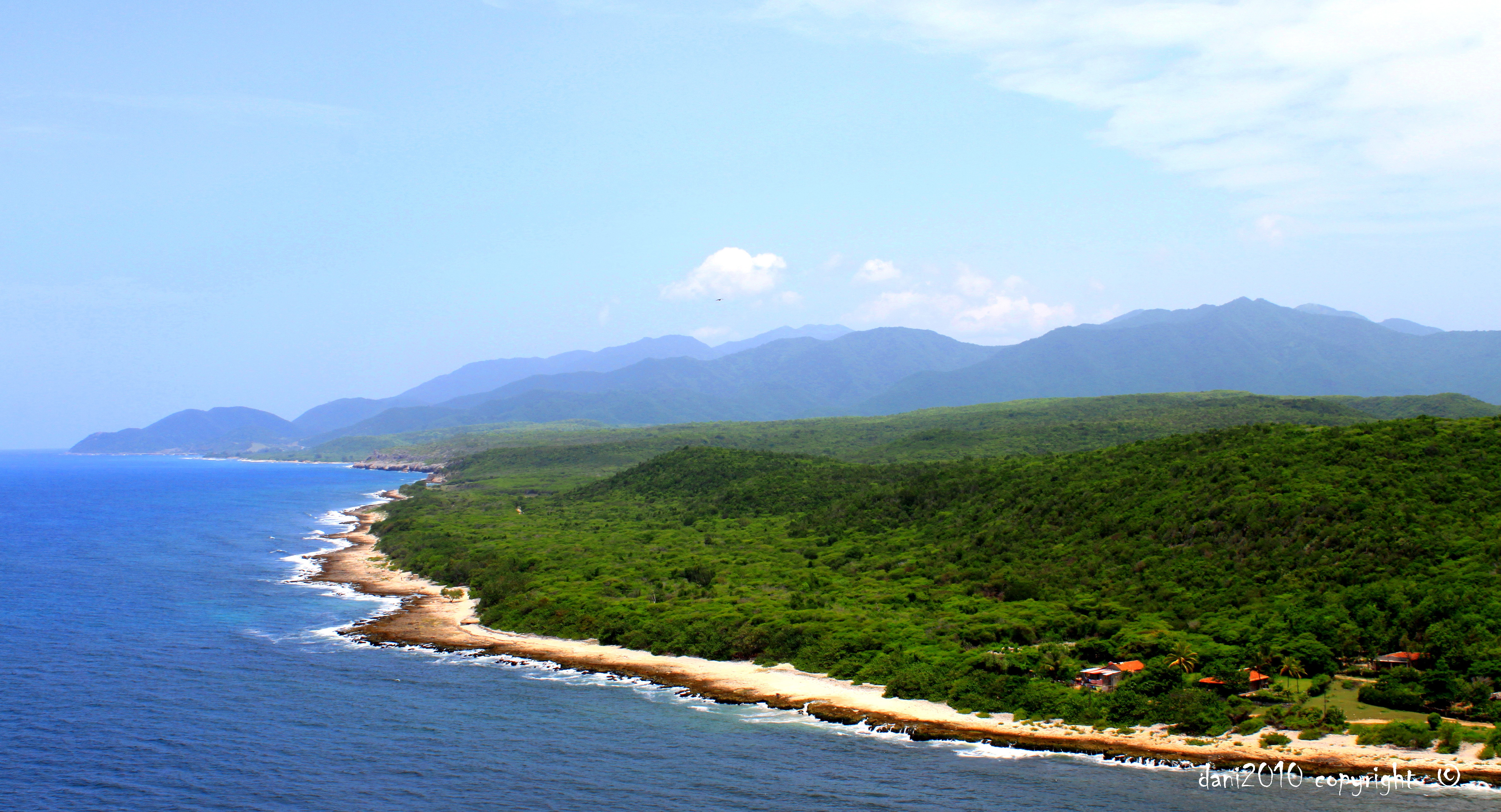
Costa de Morro

Santiago de Cuba is located in the southeast of the island at coordinates 20° 01' 17.42" N 75° 49' 45.75" W, some 870 km (540 mi) of the capital, Havana. Historically Santiago de Cuba has been the second-largest city in Cuba, behind Havana. It features a bay connected to the Caribbean Sea and is a major port. The municipality of Santiago de Cuba, its capital city, is the most populated municipality of Cuba.

The city has developed at the foot of the bay and is surrounded on land by the Sierra Maestra. It has a hot and humid climate. The landscapes includes the complexity of urban elements, and natural greenery and marine settings, all at the same time. It has an irregular offset to the bay, which contributed to the development of an urban setting where the avenues and streets are steep or descend.

=== Climate ===
Under the Köppen climate classification, Santiago de Cuba has a tropical savanna climate with no significant wet and dry periods through the year.

Climate data for Santiago de Cuba
Month	Jan	Feb	Mar	Apr	May	Jun	Jul	Aug	Sep	Oct	Nov	Dec	Year
Mean daily maximum °C (°F)	28 (82)	28 (82)	28 (82)	28 (82)	28 (82)	29 (84)	31 (88)	31 (88)	31 (88)	30 (86)	30 (86)	30 (86)	29 (85)
Mean daily minimum °C (°F)	21 (70)	21 (70)	22 (72)	23 (73)	23 (73)	24 (75)	25 (77)	25 (77)	24 (75)	24 (75)	23 (73)	22 (72)	23 (74)
Average precipitation mm (inches)	73.7 (2.90)	43.2 (1.70)	53.3 (2.10)	58.4 (2.30)	139.7 (5.50)	101.6 (4.00)	68.6 (2.70)	94 (3.7)	106.7 (4.20)	193 (7.6)	94 (3.7)	81.3 (3.20)	1,107.5 (43.6)
Source: weather.com

== Demographics ==
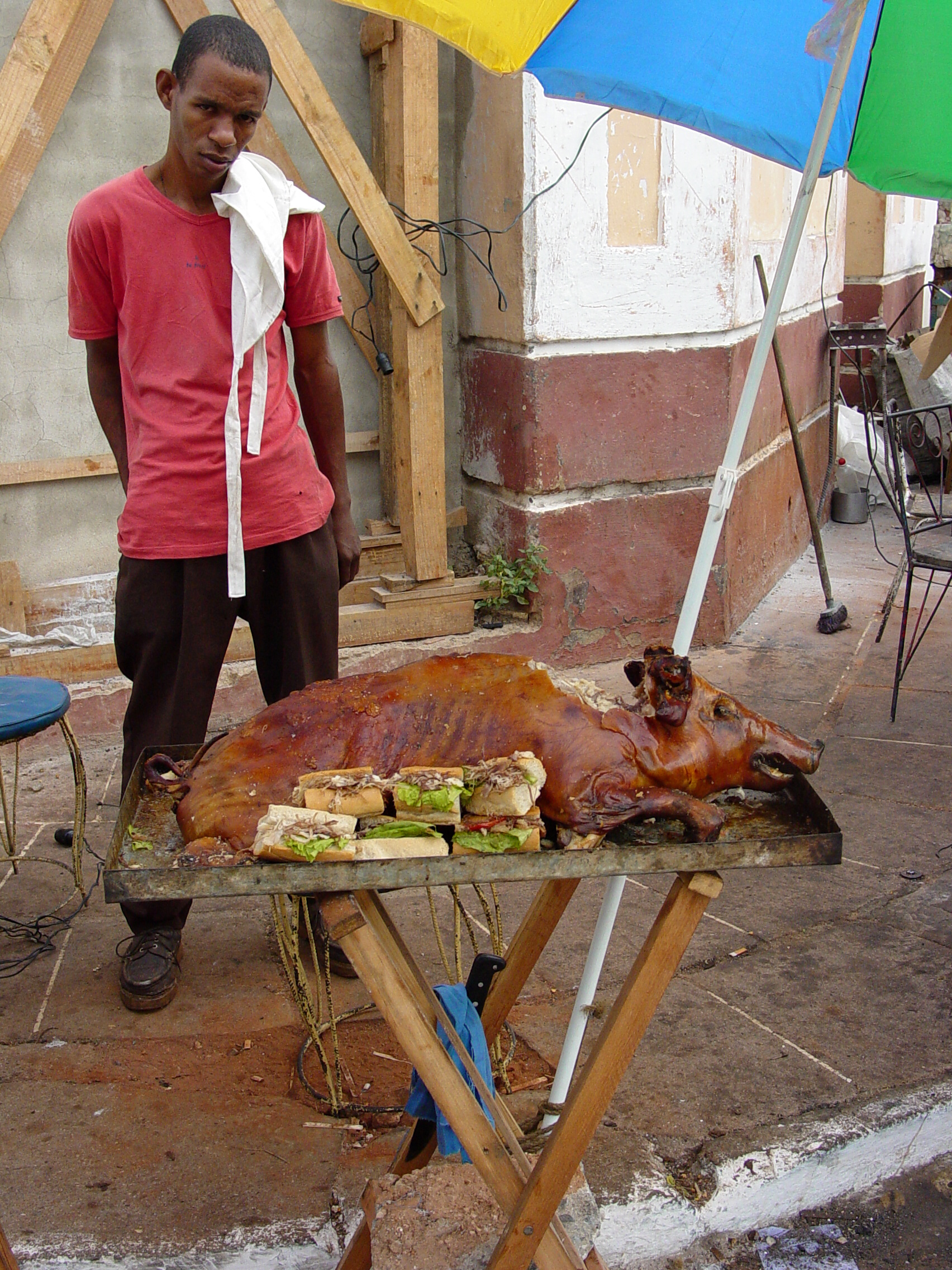
Street vendor in the Santiago slums

In the 2012 population census the city of Santiago de Cuba recorded a population of 431,272 people.

Historical population of Santiago de Cuba
1861	1899	1907	1919	1931	1943	1953
36,752	43,090	45,470	62,083	101,508	118,266	163,237
1970	1981	2002	2012	2021	2022	
277,600	347,279	423,392	431,272	508,105	507,167	
All figures are census figures.

== Transportation ==
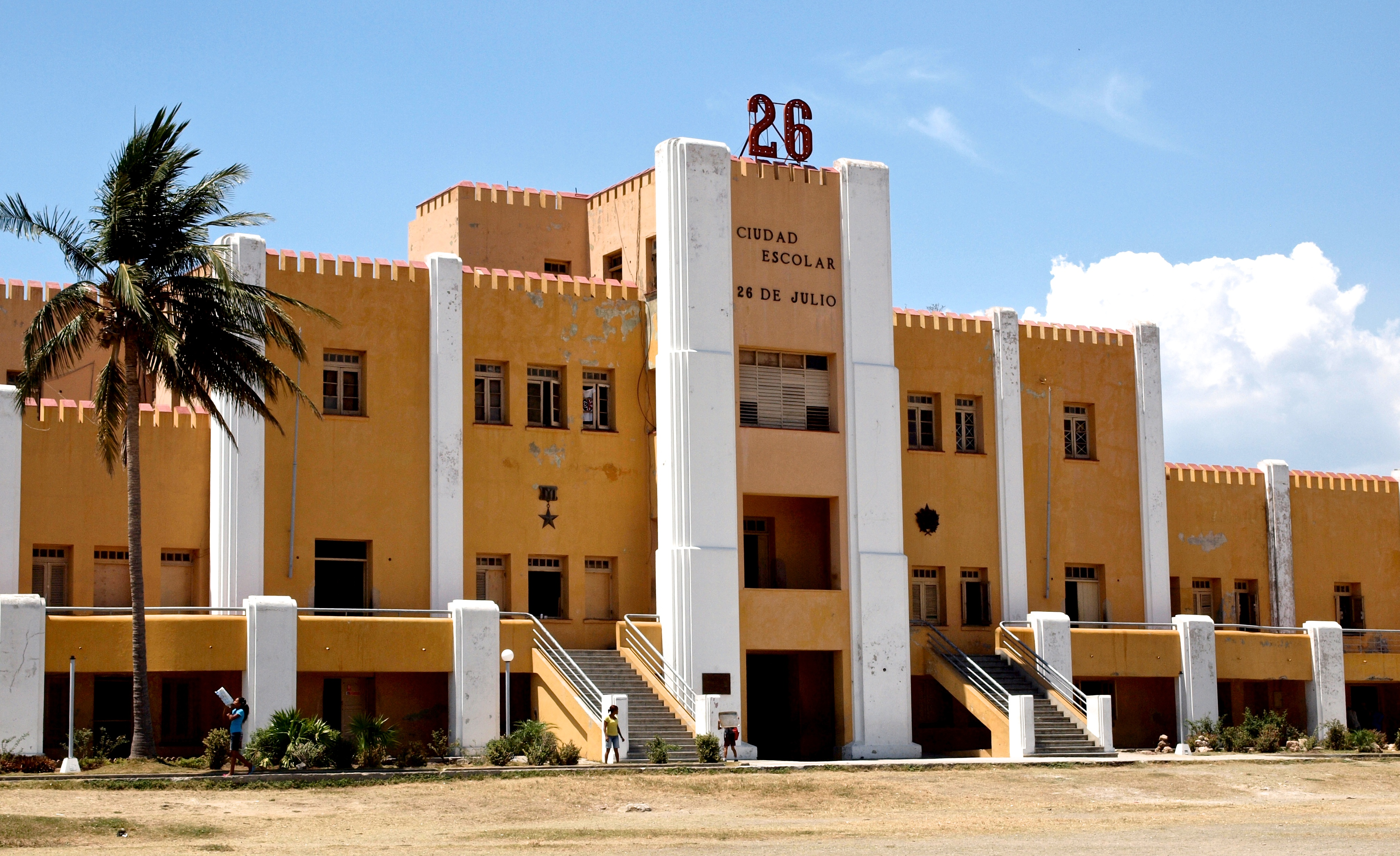
Moncada Barracks

Santiago is served by Antonio Maceo Airport. Cubana de Aviación connects the city with Havana, Port Au Prince, and Santo Domingo, with other airlines connecting to other cities in the Caribbean and North America.

The public transport in the city, as in Havana, is carried out by two divisions, Omnibus Metropolitanos (OM) and Metrobus. The Metrobus serves the inner-city urban area, with a maximum distance of 20 km (12 mi). Omnibus Metropolitanos (OM) connects the adjacent towns and municipalities in the metropolitan area with the city center, with a maximum distance of 40 km (25 mi).

Ferrocarriles de Cuba railways and ASTRO inter-city buses connect the city with Havana's Central Railway Station and with most other main cities of Cuba. The main railway station, also known as "General Senén Casas", is an important hub of the national railways. Located in the city centre, near the harbour, it was completely rebuilt in 1997.

The city of Santiago is also crossed by the Carretera Central highway and by the southern section of the A1 motorway, largely unbuilt, that will link it with Havana when it is completed.

== Schools ==
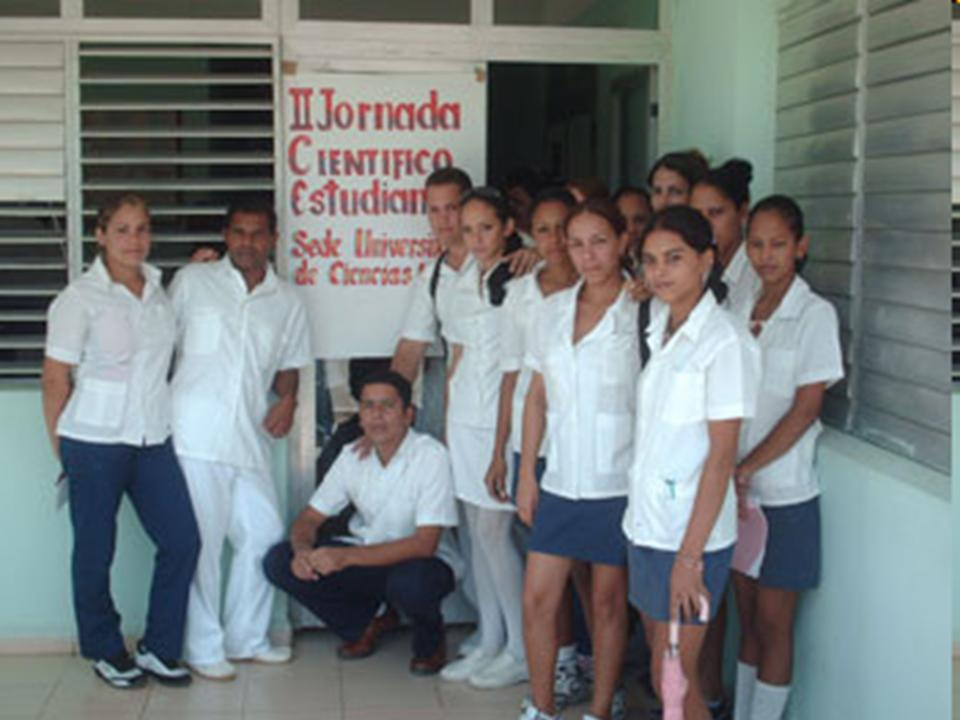
Medical students at the University of Santiago de Cuba, 2012

The main tertiary education institution is the University of Santiago de Cuba (Universidad de Oriente – Santiago de Cuba, UO).

== Natives and residents ==
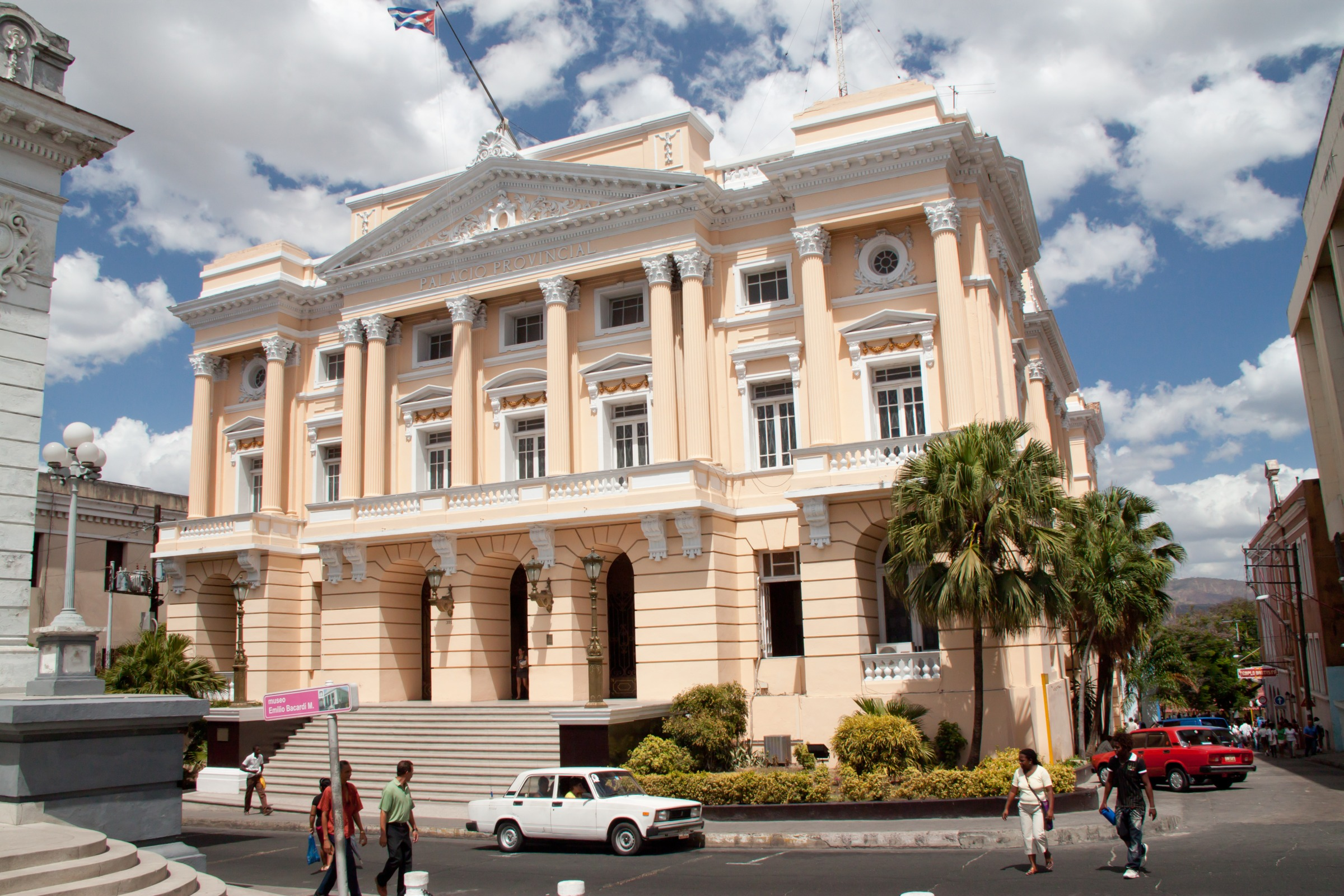
Provincial government building

- Yordenis Ugás – boxer
- Desi Arnaz – television/film actor, producer and bandleader
- Emilio Bacardí – industrialist and philanthropist
- Lili Estefan - show host
- Anyer Antonio Blanco – dissident
- Eusebia Cosme – declamdora negra, actress
- Orestes Destrade – professional baseball player
- Emilio Estefan – music producer and husband of singer Gloria Estefan
- Silvina Fabars – National Dance Award recipient of 2014 and principal dancer of the Conjunto Folclórico Nacional
- Ibrahim Ferrer – musician
- Sindo Garay – musician
- José María Heredia y Heredia – poet
- Pancho Herrera- professional baseball player
- Alberto Juantorena – Olympic gold medallist, 1976 Olympics
- Faizon Love – television/film actor, comedian
- Mary Stanley Low – British-Cuban political activist, surrealist poet and artist
- Konnan – professional wrestler
- Olga Guillot – singer
- Paul Lafargue – journalist, literary critic, political writer and activist
- La Lupe – salsa singer
- Antonio Maceo Grajales – independence hero
- Rita Marley – singer and wife of reggae singer Bob Marley
- José Martí – independence hero; interred in Santiago de Cuba
- Miguel Matamoros – musician
- Eliades Ochoa – musician
- Frank Pais – revolutionary and urban organizer for the 26th of July Movement
- Richard Pérez-Peña – New York Times reporter
- Carmen Quidiello – poet, playwright, First Lady of the Dominican Republic (1963)
- Jorge Reyes – author
- Franklin Reytor (born 1982), guitarist and producer
- Jorge Mas Canosa
- Marco Rizo – pianist, composer and arranger
- Mariblanca Sabas Alomá – feminist and journalist
- Esteban Salas y Castro – Baroque composer
- Asela de los Santos – revolutionary and First Minister of Education
- Ñico Saquito (Benito Antonio Fernández Ortiz) – musician and trova composer
- Compay Segundo – musician
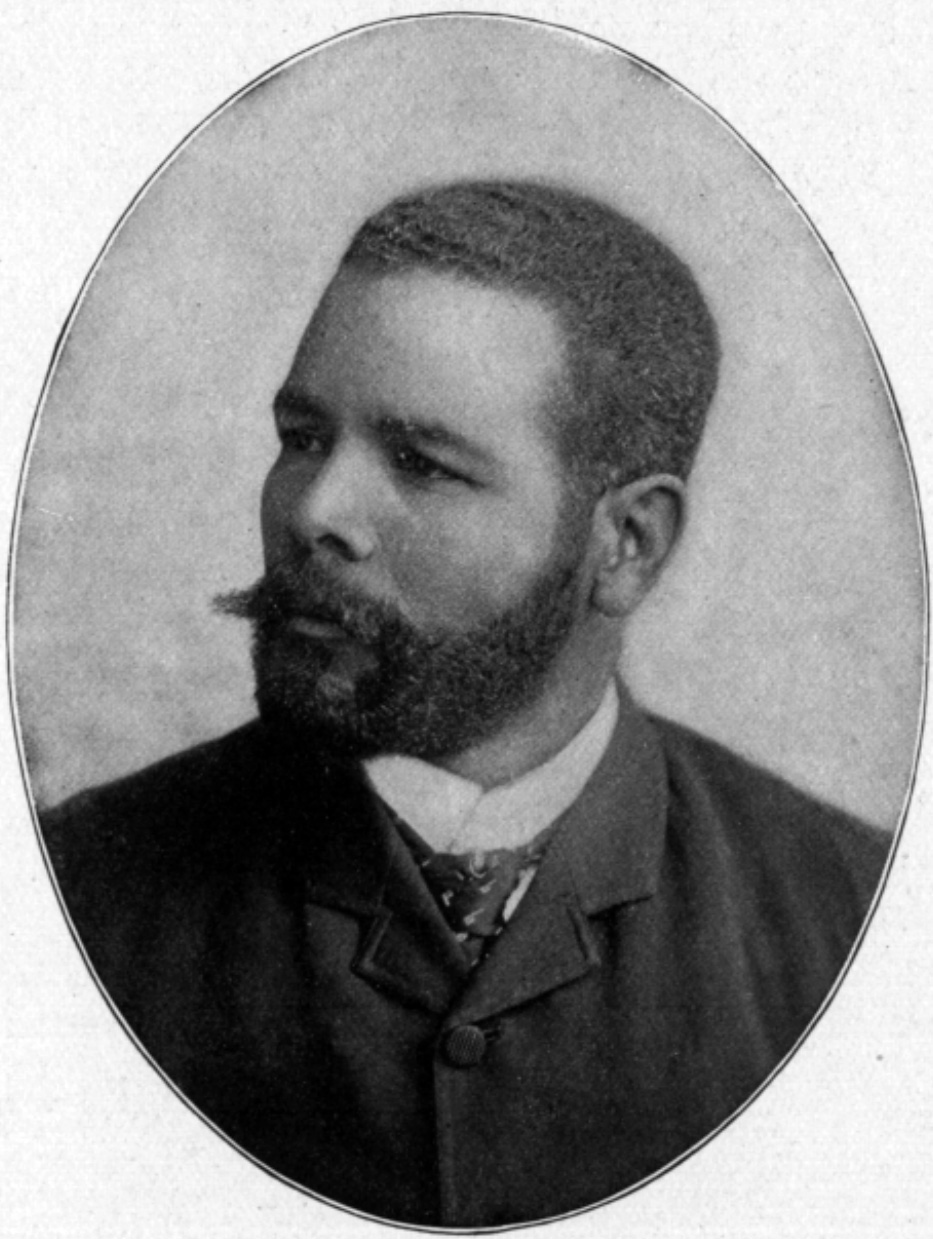
Antonio Maceo
Cuban Independence general
(1845–1896)

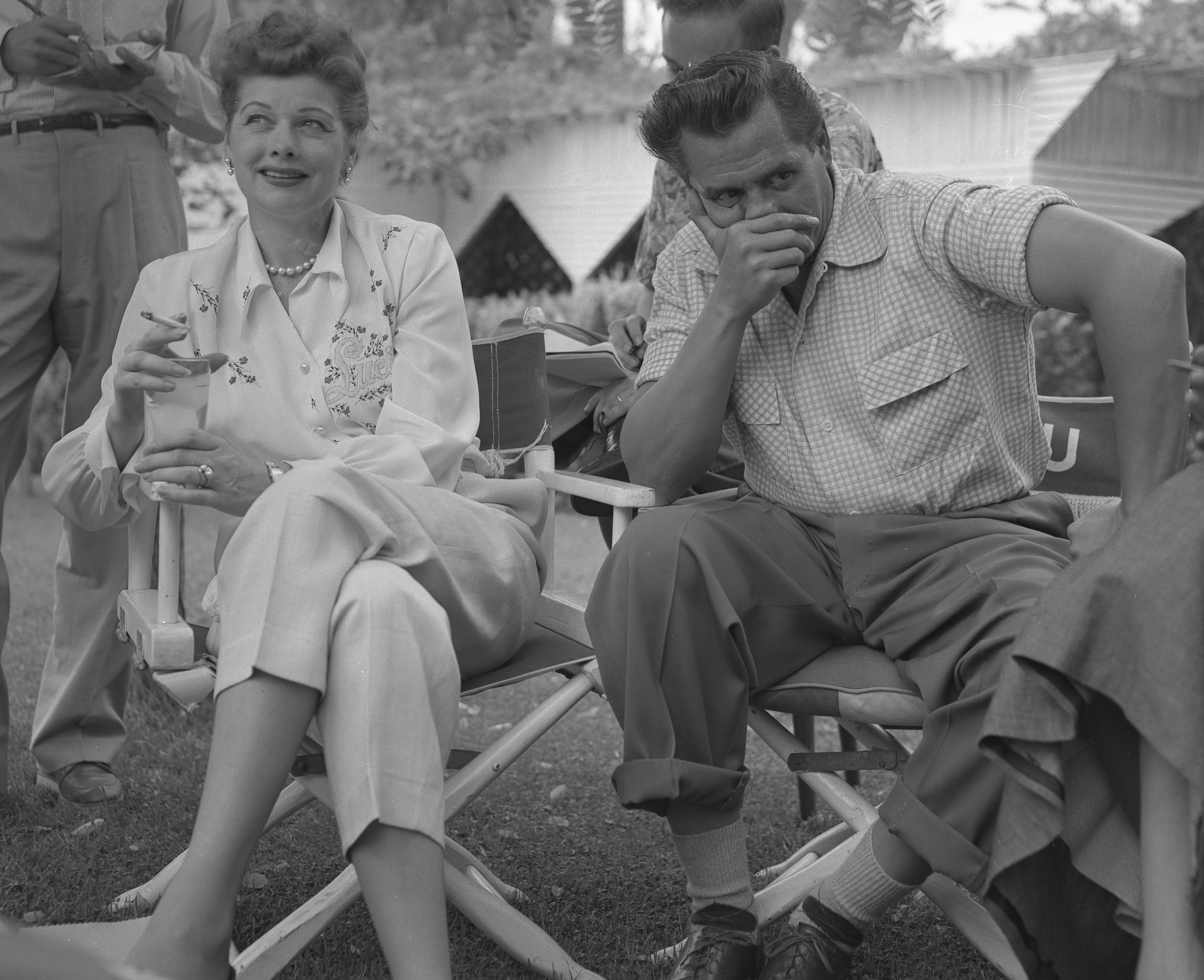
Desi Arnaz
Actor
(1917–1986)

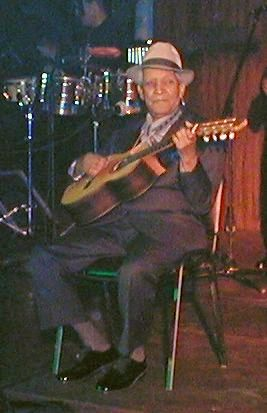
Compay Segundo
singer
(1907–2003)

== International relations ==
=== Twin towns – Sister cities ===
Santiago de Cuba is twinned with:

- Diadema, São Paulo, Brazil
- Naples, Italy
- Palermo, Italy
- Oakland, California, United States
- Rosario, Argentina

== See also ==
- 1766 Cuba earthquake
- Battle of Santiago de Cuba, 1898
- Carnaval of Santiago de Cuba
- Communidad Hebrea Hatikva
- List of cities in Cuba
- List of places in Cuba
- Oriente Province
- Santa Ifigenia Cemetery – burial place for many important figures of Santiago de Cuba
