= Poma (surname) =

Poma is a surname. Notable people with the surname include:

- Antonio Poma (1910–1985), Italian Catholic cardinal and archbishop
- Irma Poma Canchumani (born 1969), Peruvian artist and environmental defender
- Narendra Poma (born 1959), Nepalese boxer
- Pothin Poma (born 1997), New Caledonian footballer
- Ricardo Poma (1946–2025), Chief Executive Officer of the El Salvadoran conglomerate Grupo Poma
- Rodolphe Poma (1884–1954), also known as Rudolph Poma, Belgian Olympic rower
- Sebastiano Poma (born 1993), Italian professional baseball player
- Silvio Poma (1840–1932), Italian painter
