= Cobres =

Coordinates: 23°41′S 66°14′W

- Municipality and village
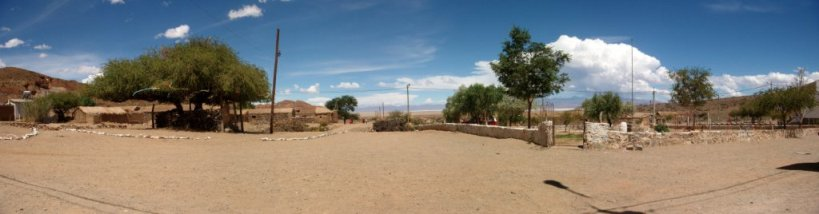
- Interactive map of Cobres
- Country: Argentina
- Province: Salta
- Department: La Poma
- Time zone: UTC−3 (ART)

Cobres is a village and rural municipality located in Salta Province in northwestern Argentina.

== Location ==
It is located just around the corner from home in a very isolated area of the Puna region of the province at almost 3,400 meters above sea level. It is accessed via National Route 40 and then Provincial Route 38, the same road that leads to the town of Susques in Jujuy province.
