= La Poma =

Coordinates: 24°43′S 66°13′W

- Municipality and village
- Interactive map of La Poma
- Country: Argentina
- Province: Salta
- Department: La Poma
- Time zone: UTC−3 (ART)
- Climate: BWk

La Poma is a village and rural municipality in Salta Province in northwestern Argentina.

== See also ==
- Cave Puente del diablo
