= El Cobre, Cuba =

El Cobre
- Town
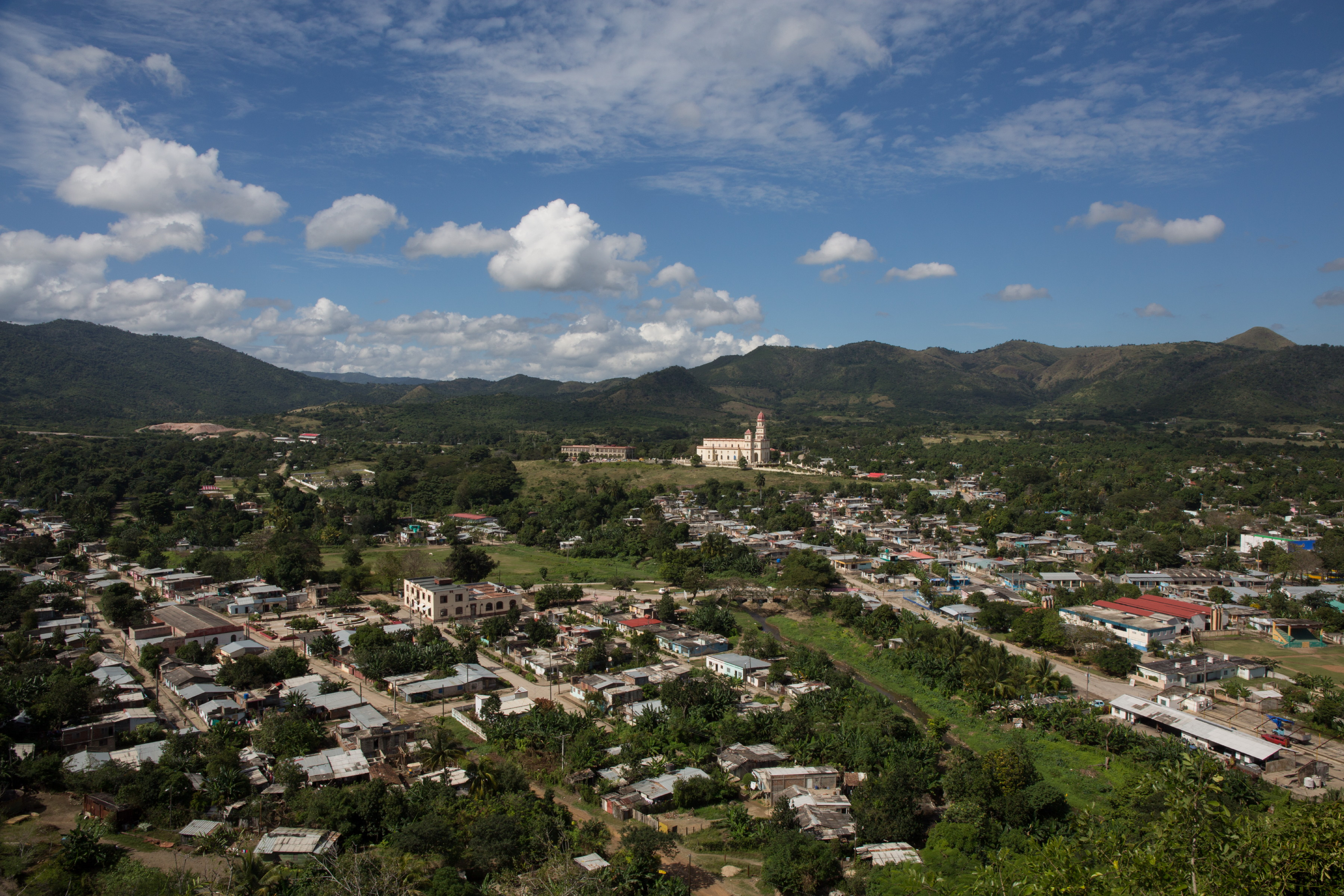
- Town's view with the Basilica in background

- Location of El Cobre in Cuba
- Coordinates: 20°02′52.8″N 75°56′42.0″W
- Country: Cuba
- Province: Santiago de Cuba
- Municipality: Santiago de Cuba

Area
  - Total: 169.5 km^{2} (65.4 sq mi)
- Elevation: 100 m (330 ft)

Population (2011)
  - Total: 7,000
- Time zone: UTC-5 (EST)
- Area code: +53-22

El Cobre is a Cuban town and consejo popular ("people's council", i.e. hamlet) of the municipality of Santiago de Cuba, capital of the homonym province, with a population of about 7,000. Mainly known for the Basilica in honour of Our Lady of Charity, Virgen de la Caridad del Cobre, the patron saint of Cuba, it was until recently the site of a large copper mine worked by slaves, free coloured people, and for a while by miners from Cornwall.

== History ==
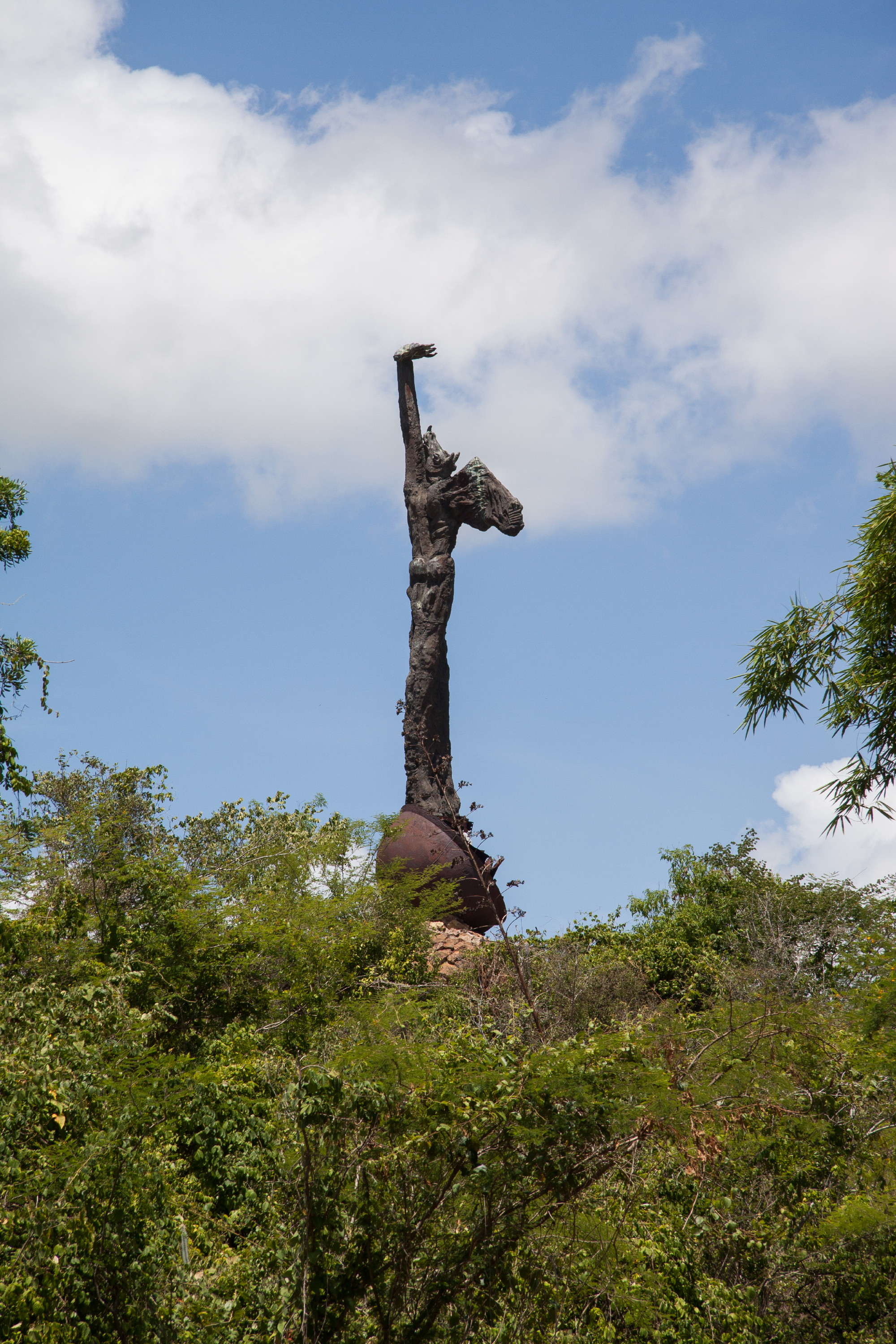
Monument to the cimarrón

=== Colonial era ===
The town of El Cobre grew up around the Cobre mine, the first open pit copper mine in Cuba. It is about 12 miles (19 km) north west of Santiago Bay in the Sierra Maestra mountains. Copper was first mined there in 1532. The Spanish crown confiscated the mines in 1670 after the private contractor had failed to comply with the terms of his contract and had neglected them for years. 270 private slaves became the property of the king, and the town of El Cobre became a pueblo of king's slaves and free coloured people, a unique type of settlement in Cuba. By 1730 El Cobre was one of just fourteen officially recognised settlements on Cuba, of which two or possibly three were Indian corporate pueblos.

In 1780 an attempt was made to return the mine to private hands and increase production. By that time El Cobre had 1,320 inhabitants, including 64% royal slaves and 34% free coloured people, mostly manumitted descendants of slaves. 2% were the private slaves of the free coloured people. The men were mostly engaged in subsistence agriculture, while mining was mainly undertaken by the women. For much of this period the Cobre mine was the only source of copper on the island, supplying Cuba and sometimes other places in the Caribbean.

The first great uprising of cimarrones, or escaped slaves, occurred in Cuba in the 18th century, and is commemorated by a large sculpture on a hill beside the town. The 6 metres (20 ft) Monumento al Cimarrón was designed by Alberto Lescay Merencio and completed in 1997 as part of the UNESCO initiative to make people more aware of slavery. The inconspicuous location on a hill above the mine, was chosen by a local babalao, or Santería spirit guide.

=== British mining ===
The mine had been abandoned by 1830. The British El Compañía Consolidada de Minas del Cobre (Cobre Mining Company) acquired the mine and reopened it in the early 1830s. An adjacent concession was acquired and opened by the British El Real de Santiago (Royal Santiago Mining Company). Both companies turned to Cornwall for skilled labour and for steam engines to pump out the mines. A Protestant burial ground was opened since the Cornish, considered heretics, could not be buried in the Catholic cemetery.

=== Post-independence ===
The town was the location of one of the first uprisings in the Cuban War of Independence, on 24 February 1895, led by Colonel Alfonso Goulet with Rafael Portuondo Tamayo, delegate of the Cuban Revolutionary Party of the East. In 1902, the mine was purchased by William A. Chanler, a wealthy New York businessman and a veteran of the Spanish–American War. Profits were initially robust enough that Chanler was able to loan $35 million to the Cuban government. The mine was closed in 2001, laying off 325 workers. The quarry filled with water, which is high in minerals, particularly sulphur. Today the town is mainly known for the Basílica Santuario Nacional de Nuestra Señora de la Caridad del Cobre, the Sanctuary of the Virgin of Charity.

== Geography ==
Located below the Sierra del Cobre, part of the Sierra Maestra mountain range, El Cobre lies 18 km west of Santiago de Cuba and 26 kn south of Palma Soriano. El Cobre River, also named Parada, flows south of it and forms a reservoir (Parada) few km east. The state highway "Carretera Central" (CC) crosses the northern side of the settlement.

== Notable people ==
- Luisa Pérez de Zambrana (1837-1922), writer and translator

== See also ==
- Basílica Santuario Nacional de Nuestra Señora de la Caridad del Cobre

== Sources ==
- "Cobre", The Cornish in Latin America, University of Exeter, archived from the original on 9 June 2021
- Díaz, María Elena (2000), The Virgin, the King and the Royal Slaves of El Cobre: Negotiating Freedom in Colonial Cuba, 1670-1780 (PDF), Leland Stanford Jr. University, archived from the original (PDF) on 2016-10-13
- Díaz, María Elena (2006), "Mining Women, Royal Slaves: Copper Mining in Colonial Cuba, 1670–1780", Mining Women: Gender in the Development of a Global Industry, 1670 to 2005, Palgrave Macmillan US, pp. 21–39, doi:10.1007/978-1-349-73399-6_2, ISBN 978-1-349-73399-6
- "El Cobre mine might become Santiago de Cuba tourist attraction", Havana Journal, archived from the original on September 30, 2006
- "El Cobre Mine, Sierra Maestra Mts, Santiago de Cuba Province, Cuba", Mindat, Hudson Institute of Mineralogy
- Guillermo Calleja Leal (15 February 1994), Una revisión histórica del 24 de Febrero de 1895 ante el primer centenario de la guerra de Cuba (PDF), CESEDEN
- Payton, Philip (2005), The Cornish Overseas: A History of Cornwall's 'great Emigration', Dundurn, ISBN 978-1-904880-04-2
- Thomas, Lately (1971), The Astor Orphans: A Pride of Lions, W. Morrow, ISBN 978-1881324034
- "Town and Mine of El Cobre", Slavery and Remembrance, The Colonial Williamsburg Foundation
- Twigg, Alan (2004), 101 Top Historical Sites of Cuba, Dundurn, ISBN 978-0-88878-440-7
