= La Poma Department =

La Poma
- Department
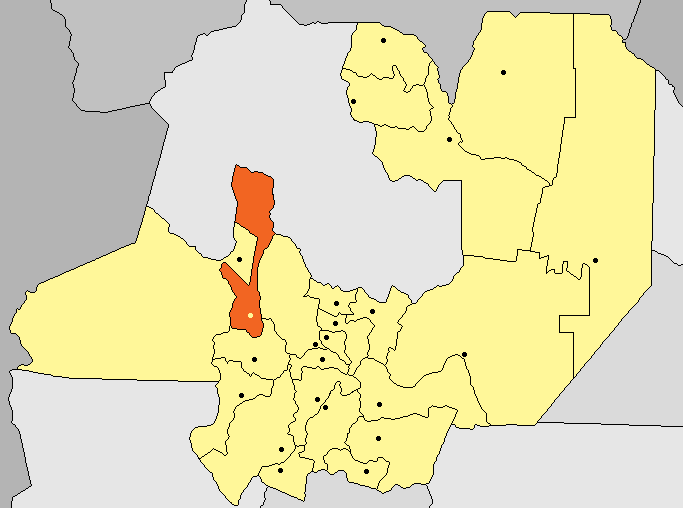
- Coordinates: 24°43′8″S 66°12′0″W
- Country: Argentina
- Province: Salta
- Capital: La Poma

Area
  - Total: 4,447 km^{2} (1,717 sq mi)

Population (2001)
  - Total: 1,735
  - Density: 0.3902/km^{2} (1.010/sq mi)

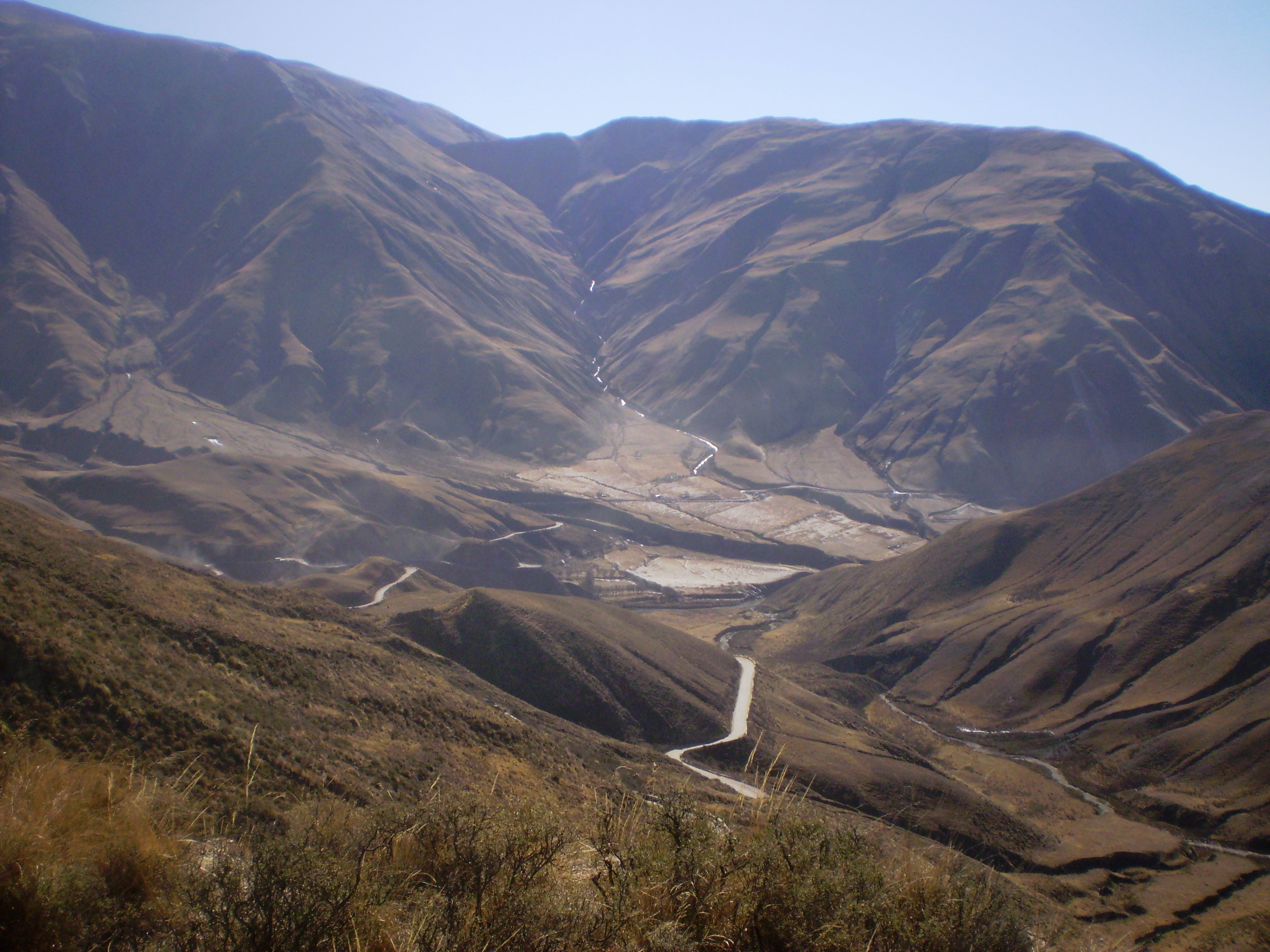
The Cuesta del Obispo, near La Poma, in Los Cardones National Park

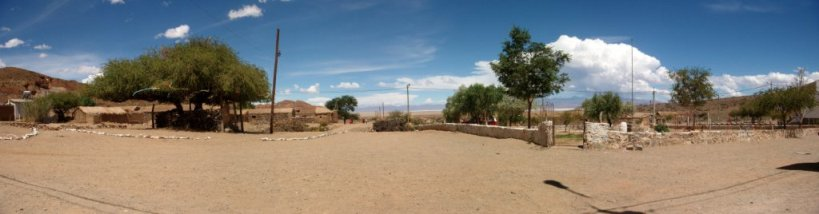
View of Cobres

La Poma is a department located in Salta Province, Argentina. It is the least populated department of the province and its capital is the town of La Poma.

== Geography ==
=== Overview ===
The department is located in the north-western area of the province, near the Andes, and includes the Puna de Atacama. It consists of 2 areas united by a territorial strip passing through the settlement of Muñano: in north the area of Cobres and in south the one of La Poma. It borders with Jujuy Province and the departments of Los Andes, Cachi and Rosario de Lerma.

=== Places ===
Towns and municipalities:

- La Poma (615 inh.)
- Cobres (112 inh.)

Other localities and places:

- Cerro Negro
- El Rodeo
- El Saladillo
- El Trigal
- El Volcán
- Muñano
- Potrerillos
- Tipán

== See also ==
- Tren a las Nubes
- Los Cardones National Park
- Salta–Antofagasta railway
