= National Basilica Sanctuary of the Charity del Cobre =

Nuestra Señora del Cobre
- Basílica Santuario Nacional de Nuestra Señora de la Caridad del Cobre
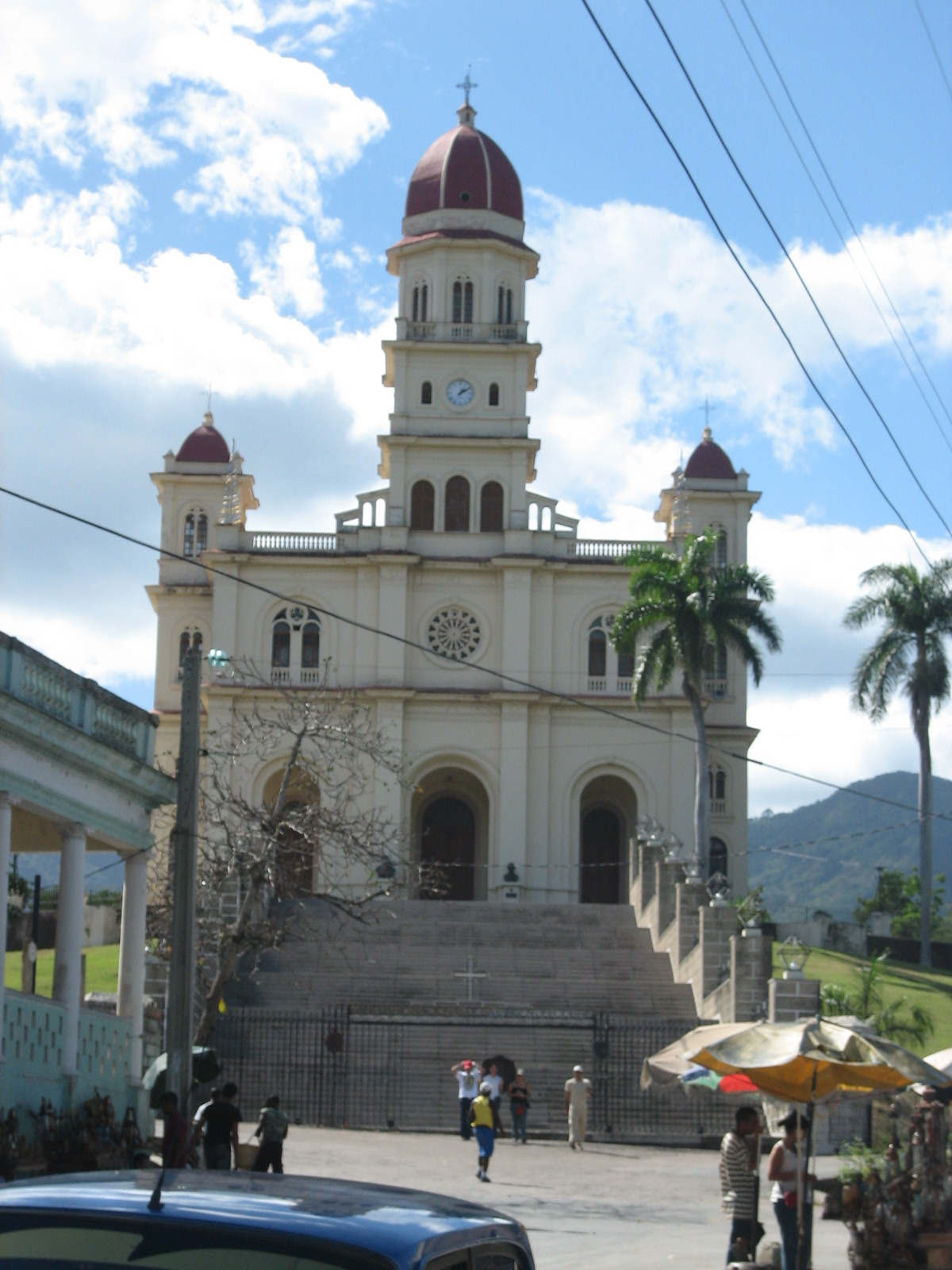
- Nuestra Señora del Cobre
- 20°3′2.9772″N 75°56′56.274″W
- Location: El Cobre, Santiago de Cuba
- Country: Cuba
- Denomination: Roman Catholic

History
- Dedication: Our Lady of Charity del Cobre
- Consecrated: 1926

Architecture
- Functional status: Active
- Architectural type: Church
- Completed: 1926

Administration
- Province: Santiago de Cuba
- Diocese: Santiago de Cuba

The Basílica Santuario Nacional de Nuestra Señora de la Caridad del Cobre (National Shrine Basilica of Our Lady of Charity del Cobre) is a Roman Catholic minor basilica dedicated to the Blessed Virgin Mary located in Santiago de Cuba, Cuba.

The church houses the Virgin of Charity del Cobre, a colonial era virgin which is a Catholic national icon, The Patroness of Cuba.

== History ==
It was built in 1926 in the village of El Cobre about 12 miles west of Santiago de Cuba. It is a 3 aisled church on the hill "Cerro de la Cantera" and is linked to the village by a flight of 254 steps. It has a central bell tower and two side towers crowned by red-brick domes.

The basilica is under the circumscription of the Roman Catholic Archdiocese of Santiago de Cuba. The basilica was decreed on December 22, 1977.

== Gallery ==
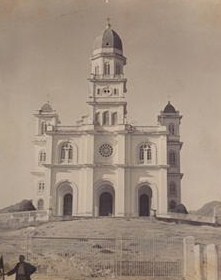
Basílica during its construction in 1926

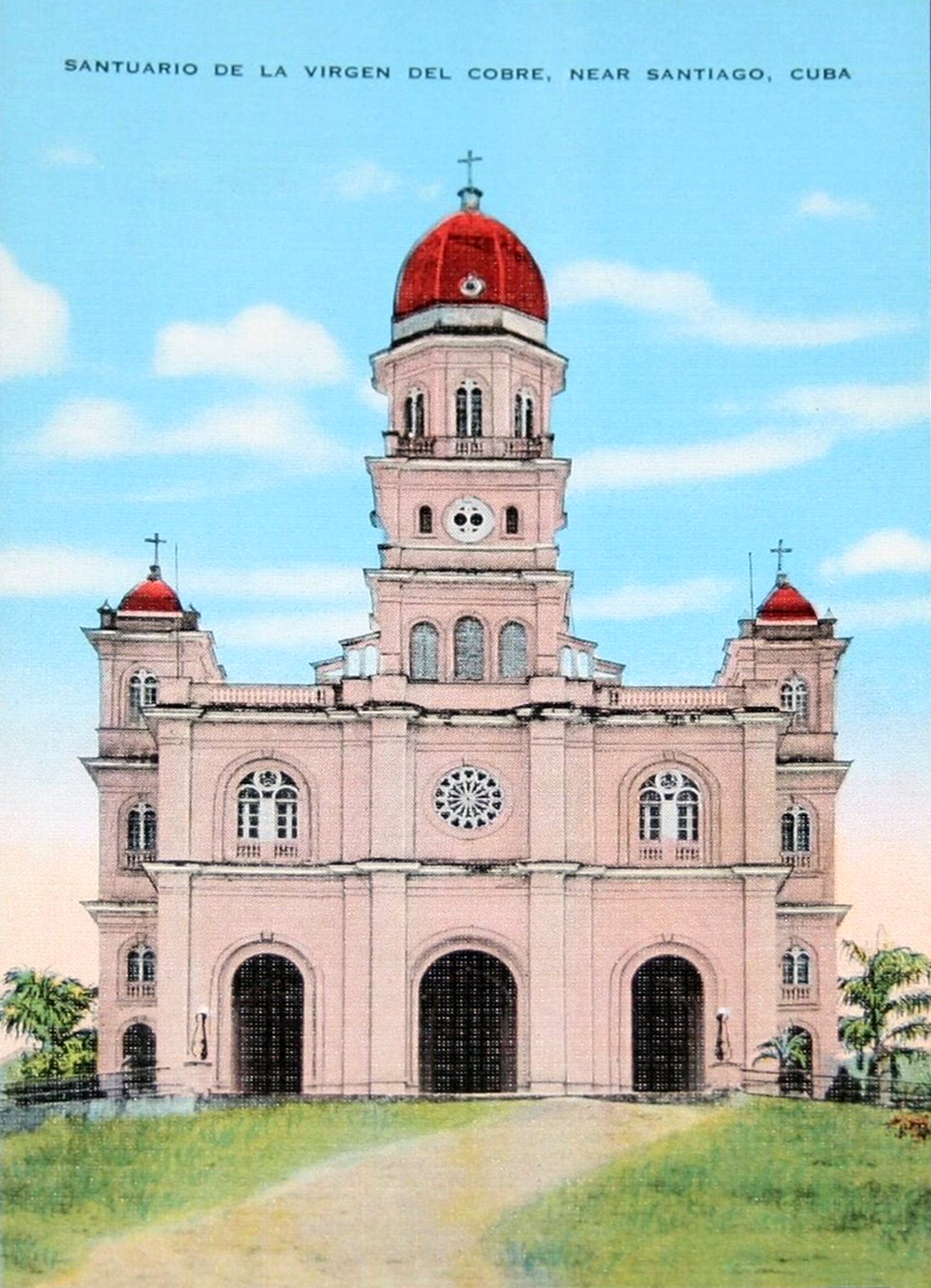
View from circa 1935

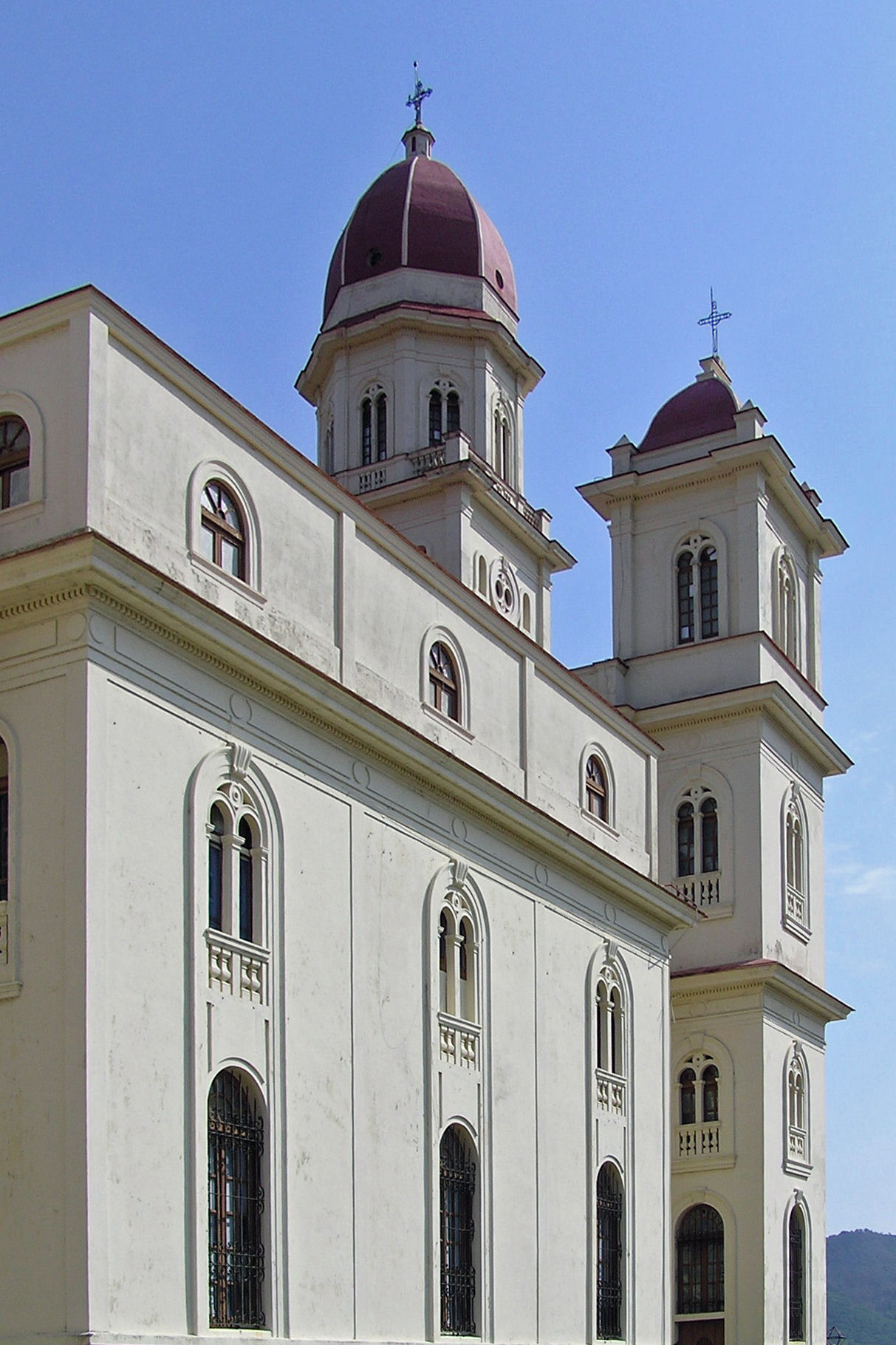
Lateral view

== See also ==
- Our Lady of Charity
