= Henry Morgan's Panama expedition =

Attack on Panama in 1670/1671

- Part of the Anglo-Spanish War (1654–1671)
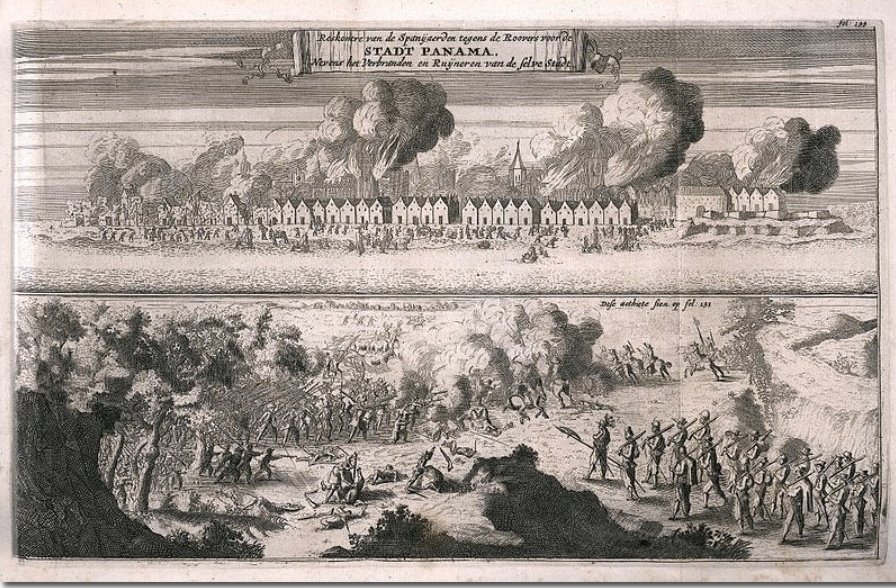
- Morgan at Panama 1671 - The top engraving shows the burning and sacking of Panama, the below shows the Battle of Mata Asnillos.
Date	December 16, 1670 – 5 March 1671
Location	Caribbean Sea and Isthmus of Panama 9°00′27″N 79°29′06″W
Result	English victory: Santa Catalina island captured; Fort San Lorenzo captured; Panama sacked and destroyed

Belligerents
(Spain) Spanish Empire	England: French and Dutch volunteers

Commanders and leaders
(Spain) Juan Pérez de Guzmán y Gonzaga (Spain) Pedro de Lisardo †	(Kingdom of England) Henry Morgan (Kingdom of England) Edward Collier (Kingdom of England) Joseph Bradley † (Kingdom of England) Lawrence Prince (Kingdom of England) John Morris

Strength
Total: 3,000 soldiers, militia and natives; Santa Catalina: 190; Fort San Lorenzo: 314; Panama: 1,200 militia 400 cavalry 600 Natives 28 canon	Total: 1,800 and 36 ships; Santa Catalina: 1,000; Fort San Lorenzo: 400 4 ships; Panama: 1,400 36 ships

Casualties and losses
Santa Catalina: all surrendered; Fort San Lorenzo: all killed or captured; Panama: 400–600 killed or wounded 600 captured.	Santa Catalina: minimal; Fort San Lorenzo: 30 killed 160 wounded; Panama: 15 killed 85 wounded

Henry Morgan's Panama expedition, also known as The Sack of Panama, was a military expedition in which English privateers commanded by Welsh Buccaneer Henry Morgan launched an attack with an army of 1,400 men (including French and Dutch volunteers) with the purpose of capturing the rich Spanish city of Panama off the Pacific coast between 16 December 1670 and 5 March 1671 during the later stage of the Anglo-Spanish War.

The expedition was set up in April 1670, and nine months later set off from Tortuga island off Hispaniola. The first port of call was Old Providence island which was captured from the Spanish after a ruse. After leaving a small garrison, a part of Morgan's force then sailed to the Panama Isthmus where Fort San Lorenzo stood on the mouth of the Río Chagres. The fort was captured after a bloody assault, following which Morgan and the rest of the force arrived a week later. Using the fort as a base of operation and communication, the Privateers set off across the Isthmus. After nearly a week's march across the jungle, with many starving, they managed to repel a number of Spanish ambushes and then arrived at the outskirts of Panama itself.

Outside the city, Morgan's privateer army routed a force of Spanish militia at the Battle of Mata Asnillos. They subsequently swept in capturing the city, which then led to it being sacked, plundered and burned. Morgan's privateer army subsequently raided the entire area including the offshore islands in the Gulf of Panama. Although the booty was high, with such a large force the net income for every privateer was lower than expected. The privateer army then set off on the return journey across the isthmus without incident, razing Fort San Lorenzo to the ground.

On his arrival in Jamaica, Morgan was informed of a peace treaty that had been signed by England and Spain in July 1670, ending the war. Morgan insisted he was unaware of the treaty, and was subsequently arrested and sent back to England. Nevertheless, he was hailed a hero and released, then knighted by King Charles II and eventually became governor of Jamaica.

== Background ==
In 1654, Oliver Cromwell had declared war on Spain, and executed the Western Design – an armada against Spain's colonies in the Caribbean. The attack on the main target – Santo Domingo on the island of Hispaniola, however, was an abject failure. The expedition then went on to Spanish Jamaica and succeeded in taking the island. Once the English had established themselves successfully, Spain then repeatedly attempted to recapture the island. Two large attempts were made but the Spanish were defeated in 1657 and the following year.

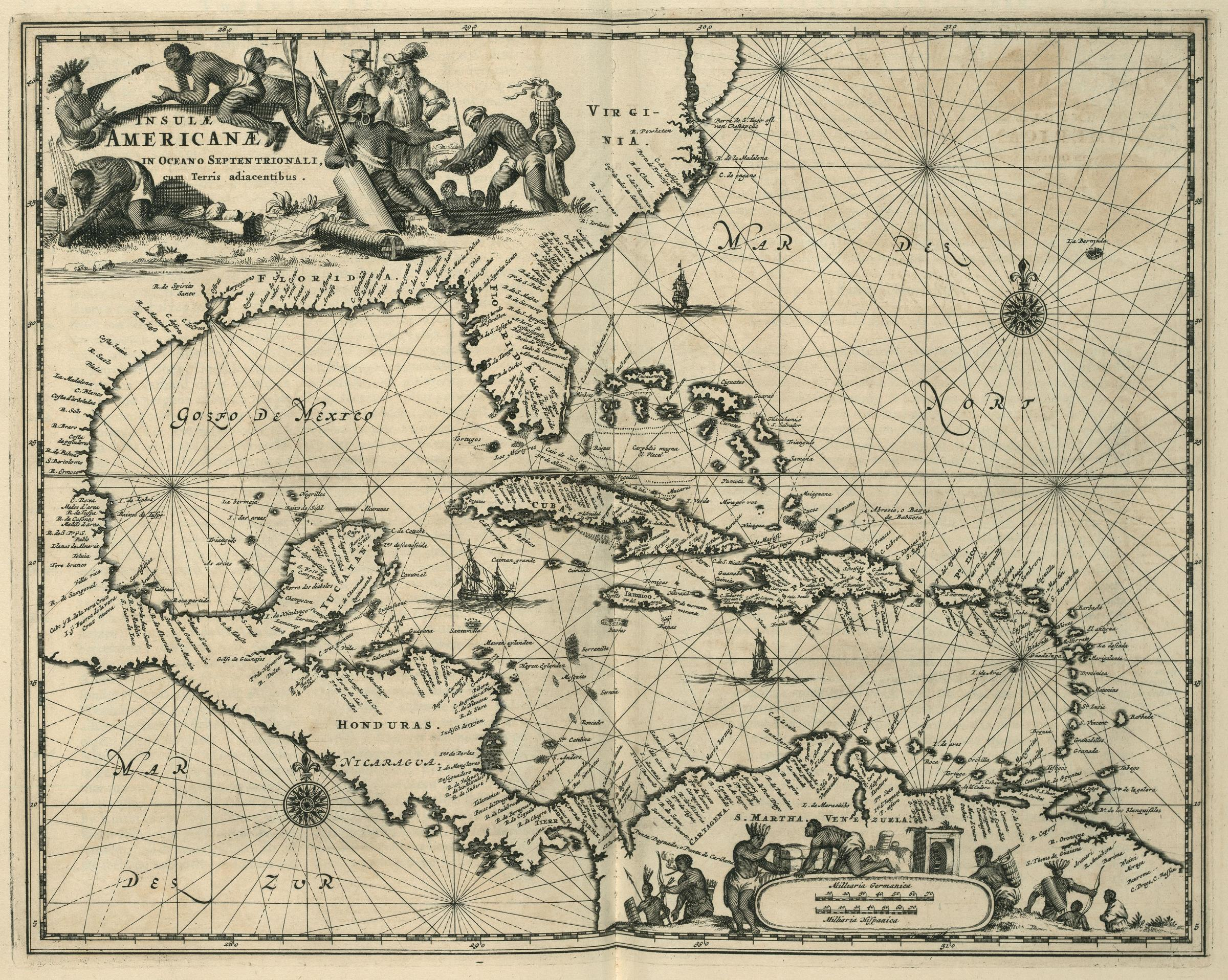
Seventeenth century map of the Caribbean

In 1660 King Charles II's restoration effectively ended England's war against Spain, but a treaty had not been signed between the two nations. The Caribbean in effect thus remained in a state of war, and as far as the governor of Jamaica, Thomas Modyford was concerned, Spain had to acknowledge England's possession of the island, and in a treaty.

At the behest of Modyford and subsequent Governors Edward D'Oyley and Thomas Hickman-Windsor Buccaneers were invited, firstly with Christopher Myngs and later Dutch corsair Edward Mansvelt to base themselves at Port Royal, to help defend against Spanish attacks. These men were mostly Protestant English, French and Dutch – also known as the Brethren of the Coast. Given Letters of Marque they went out on raids to preempt any Spanish invasion. Over the next several years they launched raids on the Spanish Main which resulted in the Sack of Campeche in 1663 and the seizure of Santa Catalina island in January 1666. The following year a peace treaty had been signed between England and Spain, but it left out any mention of the Caribbean. As far as England was concerned, no effort was made to enforce the treaty outside of Europe.

Mansvelt had died by the end of 1666, which meant that Henry Morgan, who had been in charge of the Port Royal militia and the defence of Jamaica, took over further privateering expeditions as Admiral in Chief of the Confederacy of Buccaneers. Modyford gave Morgan a letter of marque, and the 26 gun HMS Oxford as a gift from King Charles II in March 1667. Morgan subsequently conducted a successful and lucrative raid on Puerto Principe on Cuba which yielded a satisfactory profit of 50,000 pieces of eight. Another raid took place on Porto Bello (now Portobelo in modern Panama) which was more successful, garnering some 100,000 pieces of eight. In 1668, Morgan sailed for Maracaibo and Gibraltar, both on Lake Maracaibo (modern-day Venezuela); he raided both cities and stripped them of their wealth before destroying a large Spanish naval squadron and escaping successfully.

Mariana, the Queen Regent of Spain was outraged at the attacks, and in revenge ordered that all English shipping in the Caribbean was to be seized or sunk. The first actions took place in March 1670 when Spanish privateers, which included Manuel Ribeiro Pardal under a letter of marque, attacked English trade ships. In response Modyford commissioned Morgan "to do and perform all manner of exploits, which may tend to the preservation and quiet of this island".

=== Planning ===
Despite the accident, Morgan began planning for his next attack starting in April 1670, but this time he sought something bigger. He intended to seize an important Spanish port but had not decided where. Morgan realised he needed to raise a sizeable army for this achievement. He then launched a huge recruitment campaign; from the English of Jamaica, and to the French from Tortuga and Hispaniola. Morgan knew this was going to be his last voyage, given that peace with Spain was inevitable in the Americas.

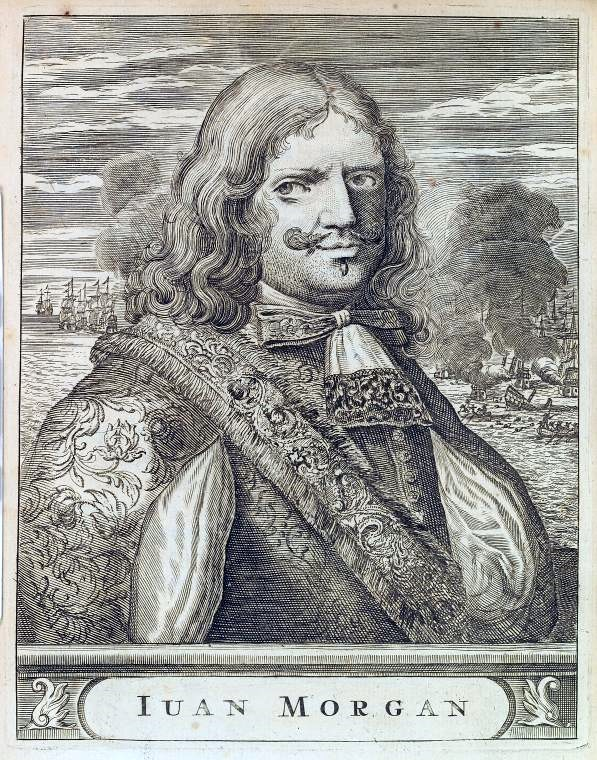
A 1681 sketch of Henry Morgan

As the expedition was being prepared and more privateers arrived, Collier was ordered to sail with six ships to Rio de la Hacha and obtain provisions and other supplies as well as to gather information from locals. He captured the recently reinforced Spanish stronghold, and acquired provisions and munitions from the local population.

On October 24, Morgan held a council of war with all the captains and other key officers to decide where they would strike. He proposed three: Panama, Cartagena de Indias and Veracruz, all in the Gulf of New Spain. All agreed that it should be Panama – it was held to be the one whose premium would be the most advantageous, because it was the richest of the three. Panama itself was the second largest city of the Western Hemisphere, a thriving mercantile community of more than 7,000 households. Every year the King of Spain's galleons loaded with silver arrived from the mines of Peru to Panama from where it was taken by land from this city to that of Portobello, on mules, to be loaded there for Spain as well as to be distributed to other parts of the Spanish empire. In order to achieve this Morgan needed a supply chain and to keep his communications open. He would need to take Providence Island, and the Fortress of San Lorenzo which lay on the Chagres. From there, guides would lead the army to Panama itself. Providence, which had previously been an English colony had been captured by Morgan before, and it was known to have banished Spanish bandits and criminals, who with a few coin were more than willing to help. Morgan planned to lead over 1,000 men along the Chagres River along part of the old 'Camino de Cruces' (Way of the Crosses), one of the Spanish routes used to transport heavy cargo on the isthmus of Panama that connected the Caribbean Sea with the Pacific Ocean. Morgan intended to follow in the footsteps of Francis Drake, who had succeeded along the route nearly a century earlier.

Morgan read out the self-governing articles to other captains and crews which were particularly generous, with captains receiving eight shares, disability compensation for all hands and even a bonus of fifty pieces of eight for conspicuous acts of bravery.

Vessels from as far as New England had joined, and by the end of October there were 30 to 36 English and French ships to carry a large number of privateers. Morgan had been given the captured fourteen gun French ship Satisfaction, formally the Le Cerf Volant, a prize from the Second Anglo-Dutch War. It was the largest ship and was able to hold eight boats. There were twelve other ships with ten or more guns carrying an average of seventy-five men apiece. The other 25 ships were smaller and some had no guns at all.

The size of Morgan's force differs between sources but there were at least 36 ships with as many as "2,000 fighting men, beside mariners and boys"; Most of the force were from the British Isles and her colonies; however, there was some 520 French along with eight vessels. In addition, there were also Dutch, free blacks, Natives, Portuguese and even a few renegade Spanish.

At the time the privateer army was the largest that had gathered in the Caribbean. The men were all well-armed and were determined to fight hard for the rich booty on offer – a mark of Morgan's renown.

The privateers included many famous men of the time:

- Edward Collier – appointed Vice Admiral of the expedition
- Joseph Bradley – a veteran buccaneer and captain.
- Robert Searle – a buccaneer who had just been released from prison in Jamaica after he had sacked the Spanish town of St. Augustine in Florida in May 1668.
- Lawrence Prince – a Dutchman who had just come back from a successful raid up the San Juan river and sacked Granada early in 1669. Appointed third in command.
- John Morris – a buccaneer who received a hero's welcome after he had a famous encounter with Manuel Ribeiro Pardal. Morris killed Pardal and seized his ship the San Pedro y La Fama while sailing off the northern coast of Cuba.
- Alexandre Exquemelin – French/Flemish writer.

Others included Francis Witherborn and Dutchmen Jan Erasmus Reyning and Jelles de Lecat.

Collier rejoined Morgan's fleet in early December, bringing back a number of prisoners. From their confessions they had declared they were preparing for an invasion of Jamaica – an incentive for Morgan to launch an attack.

Around this time, Morgan had received a letter from Modyford declaring that peace had been signed between England and Spain back in July but was awaiting ratification. Meanwhile, the Spanish had also received this news, and received reports of the privateer gathering at Île-à-Vache. The alarm was raised about an imminent attack on the Spanish Main. Most assumed that Cartagena de Indias was the target, and so the Governor Don Pedro de Ulloa put the city into a state of defence. In addition other parts of the Spanish Main were on the alert including the Chagres River defences organised by the Real Audiencia of Panama governor Don Juan Pérez de Guzmán y Gonzaga. With some 400 men, four strong points of high stockades were prepared by Francisco Gonzalez de Salado, Captain of the river, some twenty miles upriver, along with lookouts and canoe patrols.

== Expedition ==
After putting his fleet in order, Morgan left Hispaniola on December 16, and divided his fleet into two squadrons. Sailing now under regular commissions and as part of the naval power of Great Britain, Morgan thus remodelled his fleet under two different banners. The main one was led by Morgan under the English Red Ensign, which she carried on the mainmast. The other was under a White Flag with three little red squares in one of its corners which was led by Joseph Bradley. Each ship also carried the Royal standard at her bowsprit.

=== Old Providence and Santa Catalina ===

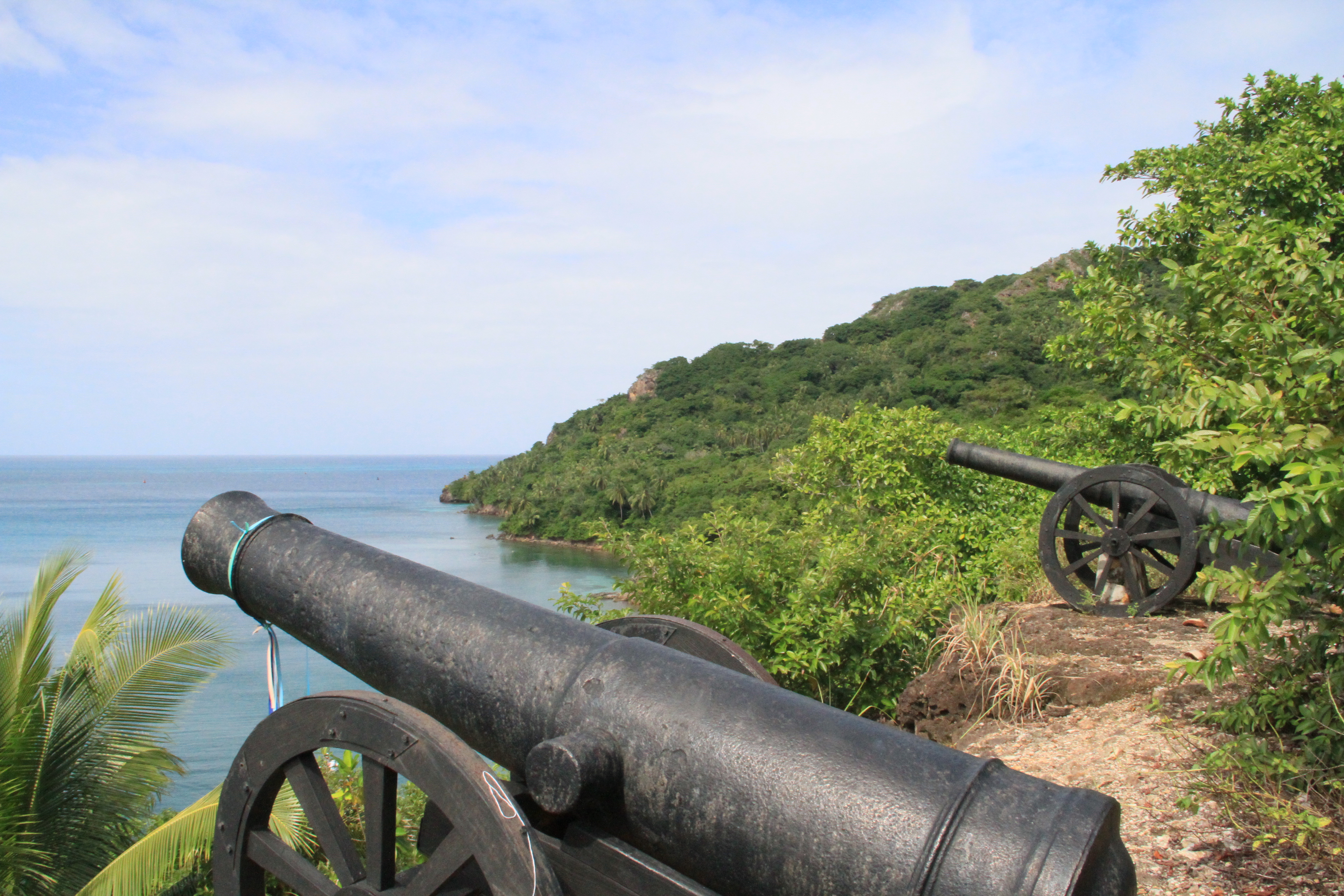
Cannon on the island of Santa Catalina at 'Morgan's Head'

Morgan's sailed to take the island of Old Providence and the smaller connected Santa Catalina in. He arrived at Providence on 20 December, landing a thousand men and then marched at their head through the woods. Resistance was light and the island was found to be deserted. Santa Catalina, however, was found to be bristled with defences and a total of eight fortifications – the largest being Fort San Jerome. Rain lashed the defenders as they advanced to the drawbridge, which connected Santa Catalina. Morgan hoped to take the island quickly so as not delay the advance on Panama. He therefore used a ruse on the Governor to surrender and threatened no quarter if he refused to do so. To Morgan's surprise the governor did so easily, but in return asked for a mock attack so that he could surrender with 'some honour'. Morgan agreed, making sure he preserved the lives of his men and the 450 inhabitants, of which 190 were soldiers. The booty gained was 48 cannons, 170 muskets, and more than 30,000 pounds of gunpowder. Morgan released the Spanish criminals, and three of them even agreed to guide him across the Panama Isthmus.

Morgan was joined by more privateers at the island including Colonel Bledry Morgan (no relative) who gave Henry a letter from Modyford approving of the expedition. Having taken the island, Morgan had left 130 men behind to garrison. They destroyed all the forts except for San Jerome. He then ordered four ships and a boat, with four hundred men under the command of Captain Joseph Bradley, to go and take Fort San Lorenzo on the Río Chagres. Morgan sent this force there, so that the Spaniards did not find out the real purpose he had in mind.

=== Assault on Fort San Lorenzo ===
Four days after their departure from the island of Santa Catalina, Bradley and the four ships arrived by within sight of Fort San Lorenzo. This fort located at the mouth of the Río Chagres was built on a tall, broad mountain, with a rock escarpment all around, and is only accessible from the land side. It was accessed via a drawbridge; there were casemates that prevented access to the moat and there were palisades. The Spaniards under the command of Don Pedro de Lisardo, having seen the ships, raised the royal flag and prepared the cannons. They had more than doubled the garrison to 314 men, improved their defences and increased its artillery to twenty guns.

The Privateers went to anchor a quarter of a league from the fort in the port of Naranjas, where they remained until the next morning. The following day a direct frontal attack on the fort was repelled with heavy loss, only going as far as the fort's ravine. Not giving up, Bradley ordered another attack at dusk, and as darkness set in, the privateers moved forward again receiving heavy fire and were unable to get any further. Nevertheless, they managed to throw a number of grenades, setting fire to several houses. One lucky shot landed on the fort's magazine and soon the resulting explosion caused confusion amongst the defenders which then allowed the English to breach the fort. Brutal hand-to-hand then took place and no quarter was given. The fort's guns were taken by the English, turned around – and fired at point-blank range into the defenders. In the fighting, Lisardo refused to surrender and was cut down and killed. The Spanish, now reduced to just a handful of men, surrendered and the English took control and doused the fires.

Of the 314 defenders, only fourteen remained to be prisoners, whilst the privateers had 30 killed and 160 wounded. Bradley having been injured during the assault died of his wounds, as did fifty of the wounded. Captain Richard Norman took over the garrison and awaited for Morgan's fleet. Four days later Morgan arrived at the fort and saw the English flag was flying. As they approached, however, four of the ships ran aground on the exposed reefs, three of them including the Satisfaction sunk with the loss of ten men. Morgan nevertheless managed to transfer what was left onto the remaining ships. He stayed for a week at the fort and repaired it using the prisoners from Santa Catalina. Morgan had to make sure it was strong enough in case of a Spanish counterattack. 150 men garrisoned the fort in addition to the 150 men in the ships, to protect his line of retreat. During this time an English scouting group captured several small Spanish vessels, each one armed with two guns. They had been used to carry cargo down the river, and were put to use to carry many of the men on the journey.

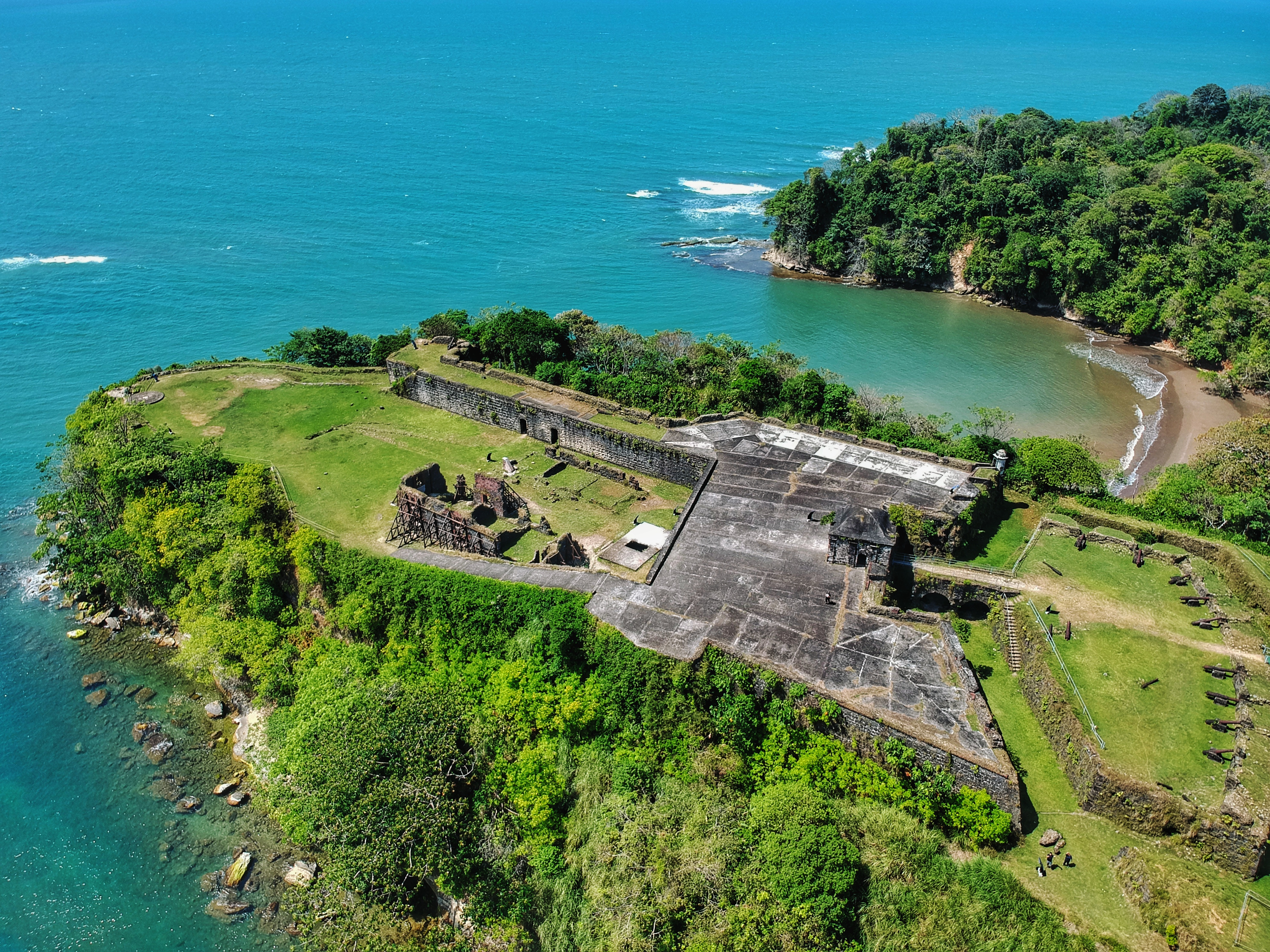
Present-day view of Fort San Lorenzo on the mouth of the Chagres River

Map of Fort San Lorenzo and the mouth of the Chagres River

=== Journey through the isthmus ===
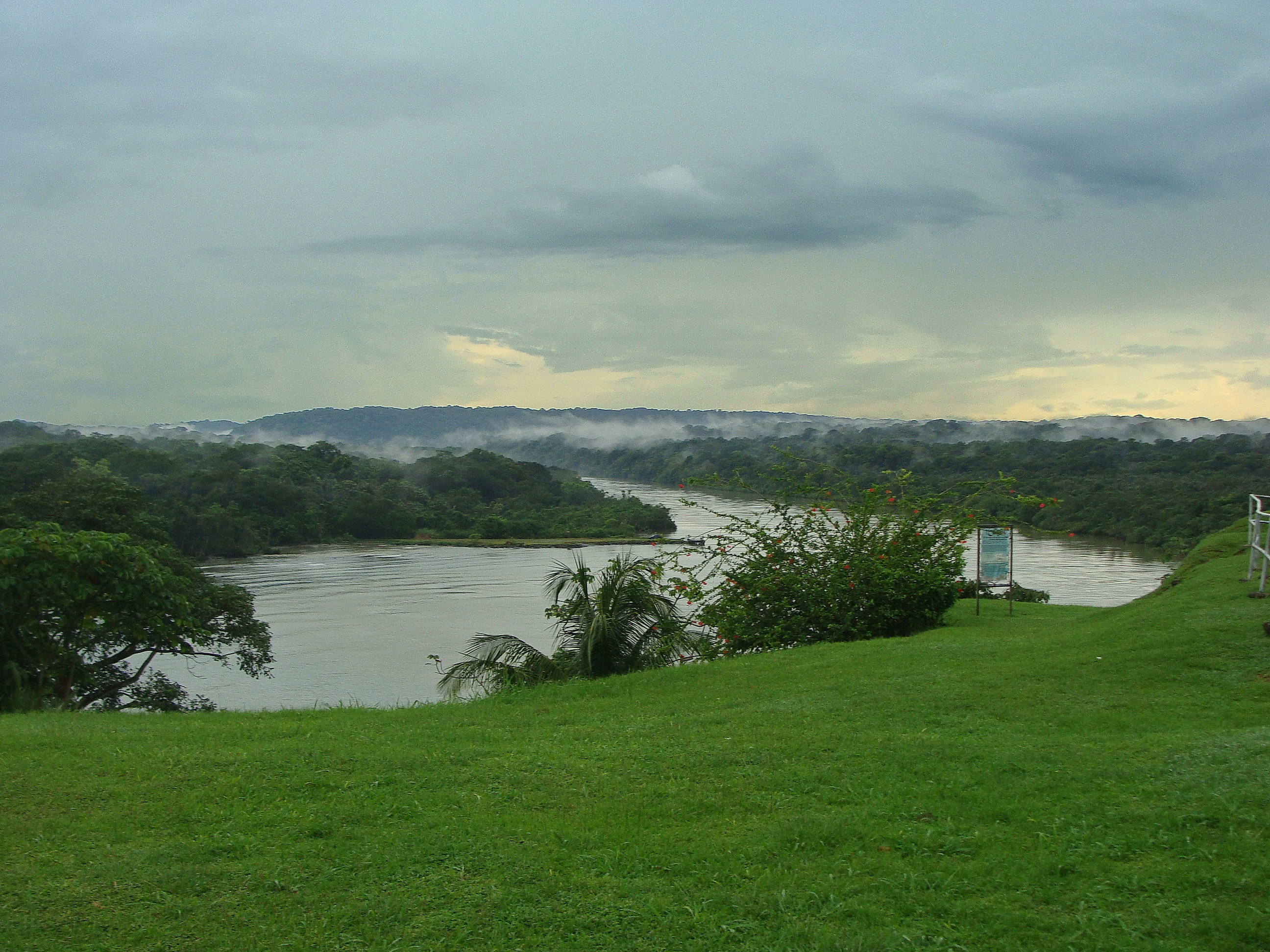
The Rio Chagres going into the isthmus as seen from Fort San Lorenzo

19 January

Early in the morning – Morgan with a force of some 1,400 men in seven small sailing vessels and thirty-six canoes ascended the Rio Chagres. The journey to Panama would be a total of some fifty miles, and much of it would be on foot, through dense rain forests and swamps.

As they journeyed nearly half the troops went along the river and the other half by canoe and boat, each with a guide. Progress on the first day was good and the privateers travelled some eighteen miles (six leagues from Fort San Lorenzo) before they arrived at their first port of call – Dos Brazos. Here Gonzalez Solado captain of the river was waiting for them. As they prepared an ambush it soon became apparent the huge numbers they were about to face. Realising they were heavily outnumbered, Solado ordered a retreat, and fled before them. The Spaniards nevertheless destroyed everything, and the privateers found nothing of value or to eat when they entered the area.

20 January

Having stayed the night at Dos Brazos, they set out again in the early morning; they soon noticed the river became more challenging. This time of year was the dry season and thus posed problems for Morgan and his men. They came to a place called Cruz du Juan Gallego and had to leave their boats as the Chagres river was low, and became more difficult to navigate in places where mangrove roots and rotting trees were exposed. With the jungle thinning out, Morgan landed his men and travelled overland across the remaining part of the isthmus with the rest dragging the canoes over land. Morgan left 160 men to guard the boats.

21 January

Guzman was kept informed of the advance and was hoping that not only Spanish troops would defeat the Privateers with continual ambushes, but also hunger and disease would. Guzman adopted scorched earth tactics for this reason, and the preparedness of the defences assured him that the English would not get through. Nevertheless, Morgan's guides proved very useful – they would walk with twenty to thirty men ahead or in flank to deter any further ambushes. Around noon they encountered swampland and could find no road, or even any way to get further. Nevertheless, they managed to create a passage to a place called Cedro Bueno. Progress was slow and it had been three or four days since most had eaten, and many began to grow weak. Some were reduced to eating the leaves off trees and other vegetation, with mixed results.

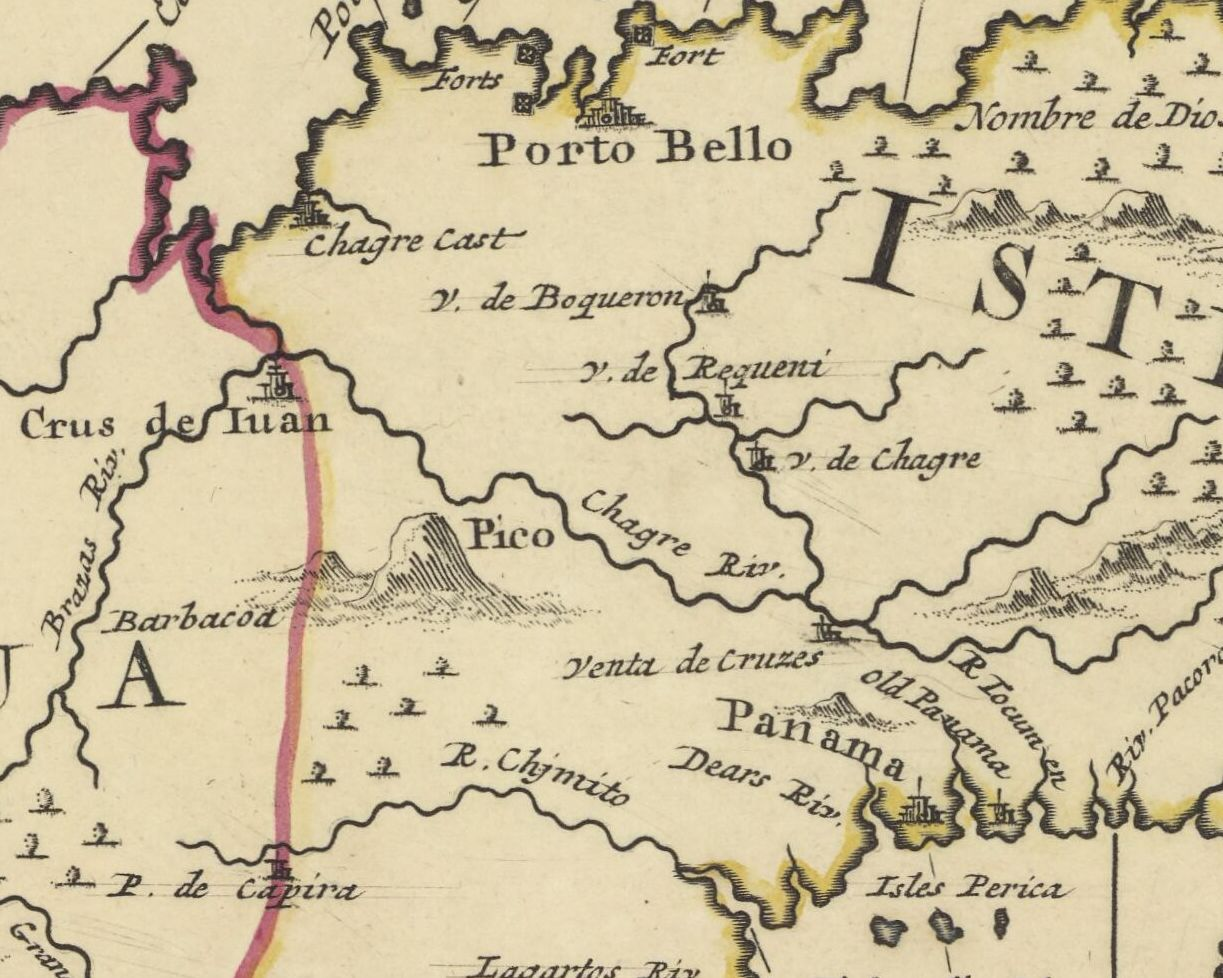
1702 map of the Isthmus of Panama – Morgan and his men went from top 'Chagre cast' along the River Chagres to 'Old Panama' (at bottom)

January 22

By morning they had reached Barro Colorado – two canoes which rowed ahead, turned back and reported that they had discovered an ambush. After getting ready, the privateers started making war cries and running – the tactic worked as soon found the ambush site abandoned. It consisted of a strong palisade in the shape of a crescent, the posts of which were trees. When they left the place, they took the provisions and burned what they could not take. Morgan seeing that he could not find food, advanced as long as possible. They walked the rest of the day hacking through the jungle and arrived in the evening at a place called Torna Munni, where they met another ambush, but the Spanish also abandoned this. By nightfall, they slept on the riverbanks in some discomfort – at this time of the year the nights were also cold.

January 23

The following day the expedition had arrived at Barbacoa, the first Spanish village they come across, and the first of the defensive stockades, which they also found burnt and abandoned. With just 216 men under Captain Castillo the Spanish feared being cut off and so abandoned the place. There were several dwellings, which the English searched everywhere and managed to find two sacks of flour buried in the ground with fruits called plantanos, but that was all, some were even reduced to eating leather bags the Spanish had left behind. By the end of day five they moved to another outpost called Torno Marcos. Again Morgan's men expected to be ambushed, but instead found nothing – they rested the night here.

January 24

They resumed their journey but weakness prevented many from going forward. About noon the privateers reached the village of Venta de Cruces and found an outlying house, which they found full of corn and a leather sack full of bread. Shortly after this discovery, they saw some natives walking ahead of them. They began to pursue them, believing they would meet a Spanish ambush; the natives crossed the river and eluded the privateers. A number of Spanish soldiers shouted at them from afar, 'To the plain, ye cuckolds, ye English dogs!'. The men settled in Venta de Cruces for the day.

January 25

The Chagres turned North East at the village so the privateers now crossed the river and continued on land. They left their boats and canoes at Venta de Cruces to be sent back down river, except one which was left in the village with a small group of men to protect Morgan's line of communication. Panama was now but 25 miles, and as they passed Gamboa the terrain became more difficult, with mountains starting to rise on each side. By noon they came to the village of Cruz which the inhabitants had left after setting fire to the houses except the king's shops and stables. Starving, the privateers killed all the dogs that were housed in the stables and then ate them. They rested before setting off the next morning. Jars of Peruvian wine were found and consumed with many getting drunk and sick – many thinking that the Spanish had poisoned it. Morgan wondered at this point with many still starving and many becoming more sick, if he could carry on to Panama.

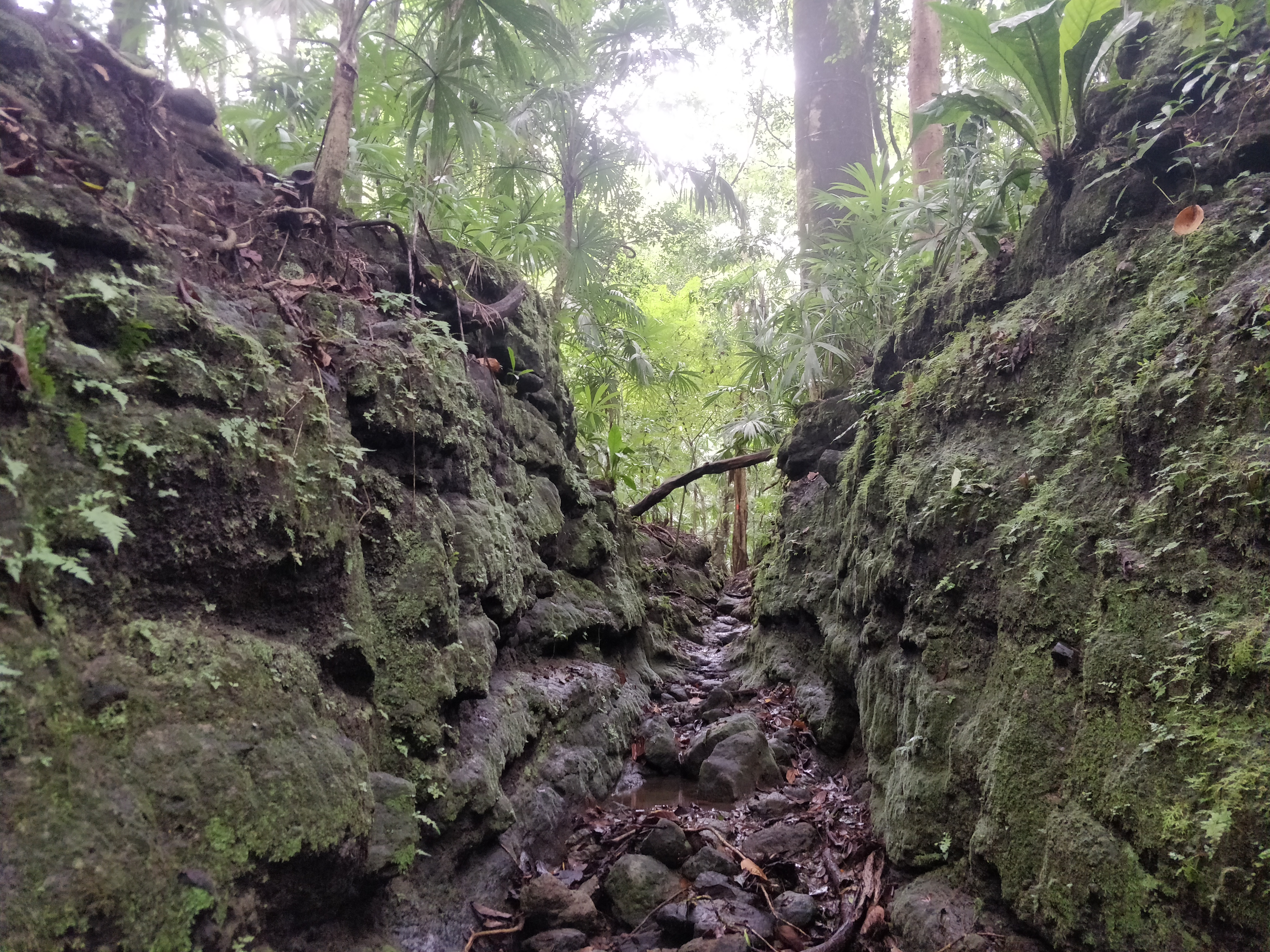
Section of the jungle track on the 'Camino Real de Cruces' – the Privateers would have used this on the way to Panama

January 26

In the morning, they set off with the road becoming narrower and steep-sided. Morgan chose two hundred men to serve as a forlorn hope further ahead behind the main column. They came across several narrow gorges which only allowed passage for two men side by side.

At noon they arrived at a place called Quebrada Obscural, and here Salado had set up his last ditch ambush point – he sent some 300 native archers and 100 Spanish musketeers under the command of a Black man named José de Prado, one of the few survivors from San Lorenzo fort. The privateers were surprised by a rain of arrows which killed eight to ten men, and wounded as many. Nevertheless, the privateers' tactics worked and the ambushers were driven off with some loss – one band of natives stood their ground and fought until their chief was severely wounded forcing them to withdraw. Despite this attack the privateers continued their advance, and by late evening the jungle and mountainous terrain started to become less. They soon approached grassland savannah where there was less danger of ambushes. In the evening they stopped in a group of houses to rest and sleep, to continue their advance.

January 27

In the morning, a scout party ascended Ancon Hill – when they reached the top they could the see the Pacific Ocean and observed a ship with five boats having left Panama. They saw their destination was a series of islands (most likely the islands of Taboga and Taboguilla). The scouting party descended and found themselves in a valley where there was a meadow full of cattle, which many Spaniards on horseback were herding. With the arrival of the Privateers the Spanish horseman abandoned these animals to save themselves. The cattle and horses were all slaughtered, and the hungry privateers sat down to a Barbecue feast. They rested for most of the afternoon before setting off again – soon they began to see the roofs and spires of Panama.

Morgan then encamped his 1,200 men for the night – the Spanish led by the governor Don Guzmán was alerted by the Privateer arrival and soon prepared for Panama's defence. Two squadrons of cavalry and four regiments of foot were brought up and stationed on the savannah. The Spanish outnumbered Morgan's men by nearly two to one, and in order to deter any attack by them Morgan had drums beating, trumpets blown, occasional volleys fired and flags displayed. The Spaniards meanwhile also did the same, and their morale was high – one militiaman claimed to have said, 'we have nothing to fear. There are no more than 600 drunkards'.

=== Battle of Mata Asnillos ===
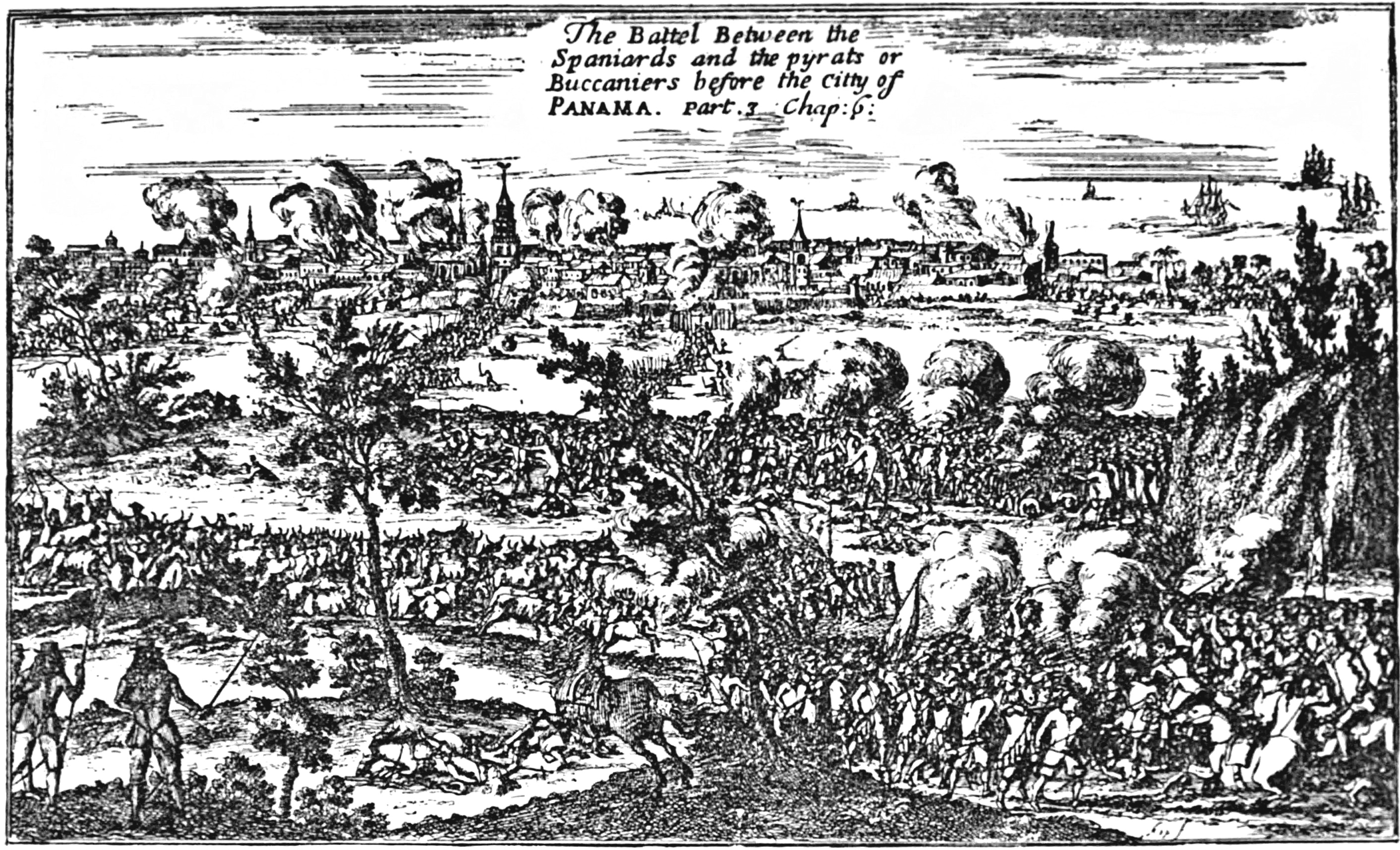
Battle of Mata Asnillos

On January 28 Morgan's force prepared for battle – they faced approximately 1,200 Spanish infantry and 400 cavalry. Although they outnumbered Morgan's force, most were inexperienced – only 600 had various firearms, while the rest were mainly armed with edged weapons, such as machetes, pikes and spears. Guzman drew up his infantry in a line, six men deep with two companies of the cavalry on either flank. Behind him were two herds of oxen, cattle and other livestock ready to be released by a number of drovers. Guzman hoped to allow the buccaneers to pass through his lines, setting the herds against the attackers to presumably disrupt and disorganize them just before the Spanish foot made contact with the privateers.

Morgan drew up his army in battle just outside of cannon range, on a plain that lay behind the Matasnillo River a mile outside the city with the Spanish on the other side. Laurence Prince and John Morris commanded the main force, around 600 men, with Morgan and Collier leading the right and left wings respectively, while the rearguard was commanded by Colonel Bledry Morgan.

At 7 pm the two sides then advanced against each other. The privateers advanced in four squadrons across a mile over the plain – Morgan sent one squadron, a 300-strong party led by Major John Morris down a ravine that led to the foot of a small hill on the Spanish right flank. As they disappeared from view, the Spanish front line assumed the privateers were retreating; this forced the Spanish defenders into committing to an attack, and the left wing broke rank and chased. Guzmen then ordered the remainder of the defending infantry forward. They were, however, met with a well-organised fire from Morgan's main force of troops – nearly 100 men were cut down with the first volley. When the left flank of the privateers under Laurence Prince came into view at the end of the ravine, they were charged by the Spanish cavalry led by Francisco Haro. The ground here, however, was boggy, and the cavalry could not manoeuvre well. The privateers were able to deliver accurate musket fire into them at thirty yards, dismounting many including Haro himself. The Spanish horse was compelled to retreat.

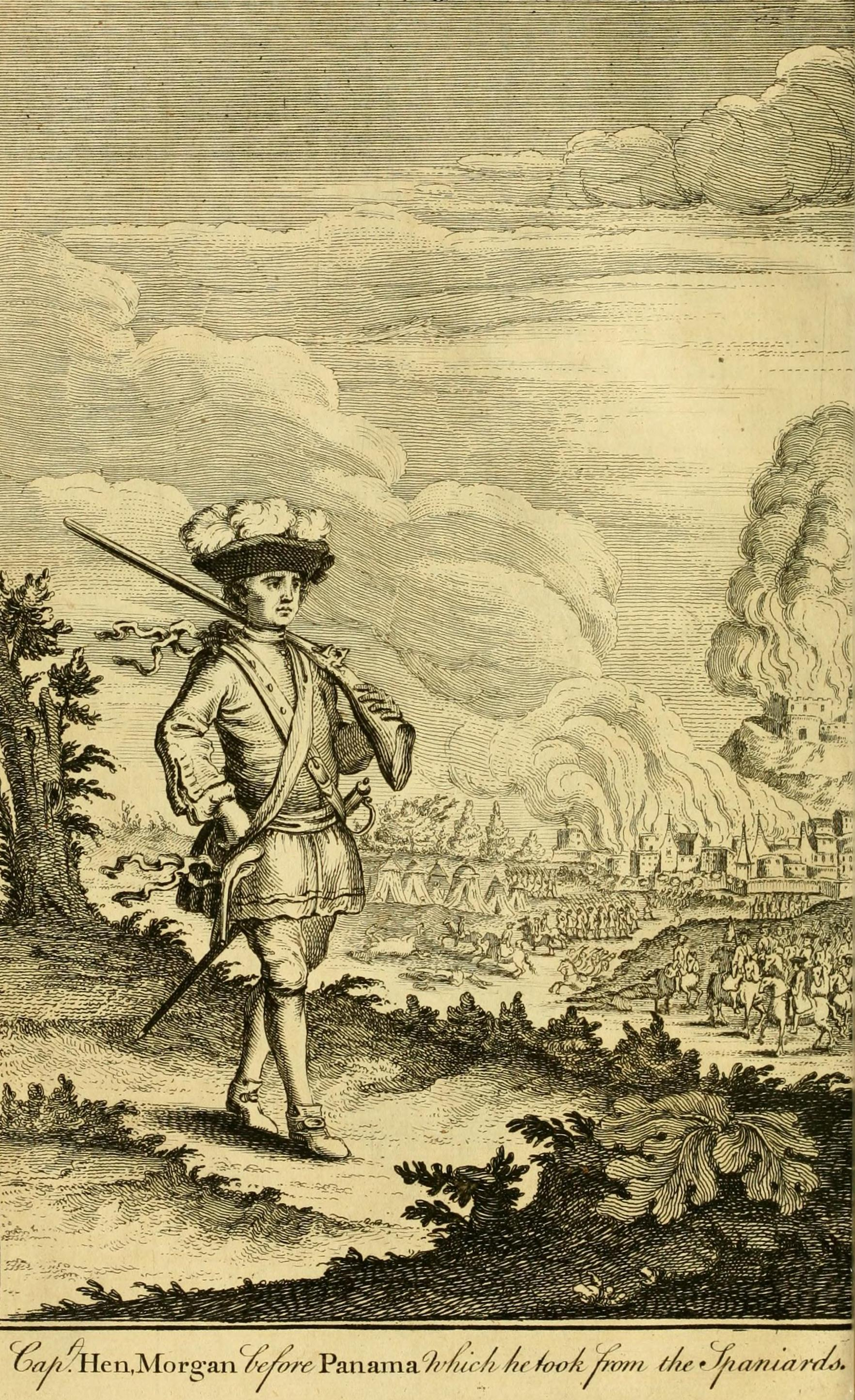
Captain Henry Morgan before Panama, 1671

The Spanish infantry attack meanwhile wavered and many began to flee the battle. This then forced the Spanish drovers to panic, which allowed the cattle to wander among the Spanish lines. Guzman ordered their release without realising that many already had been. Scared by the noise of the gunfire, the cattle turned and then stampeded over their keepers and then the Spanish troops. The few cattle that reached the privateer lines were shot by the still-hungry privateers. The Spanish line collapsed; Don Juan attempted in vain to stop the retreat leaving the field in the hands of the English.

The battle was a rout and had lasted two hours: Spanish casualties were heavy – this left between 400 and 600 dead and wounded.

=== Sack of Panama ===
Morgan's men pursued the retreating Spanish into the city itself. They swarmed over the bridge at the West end where there was some resistance in the three main streets. Barricades had been set up but these were overwhelmed and the looting began straight away.

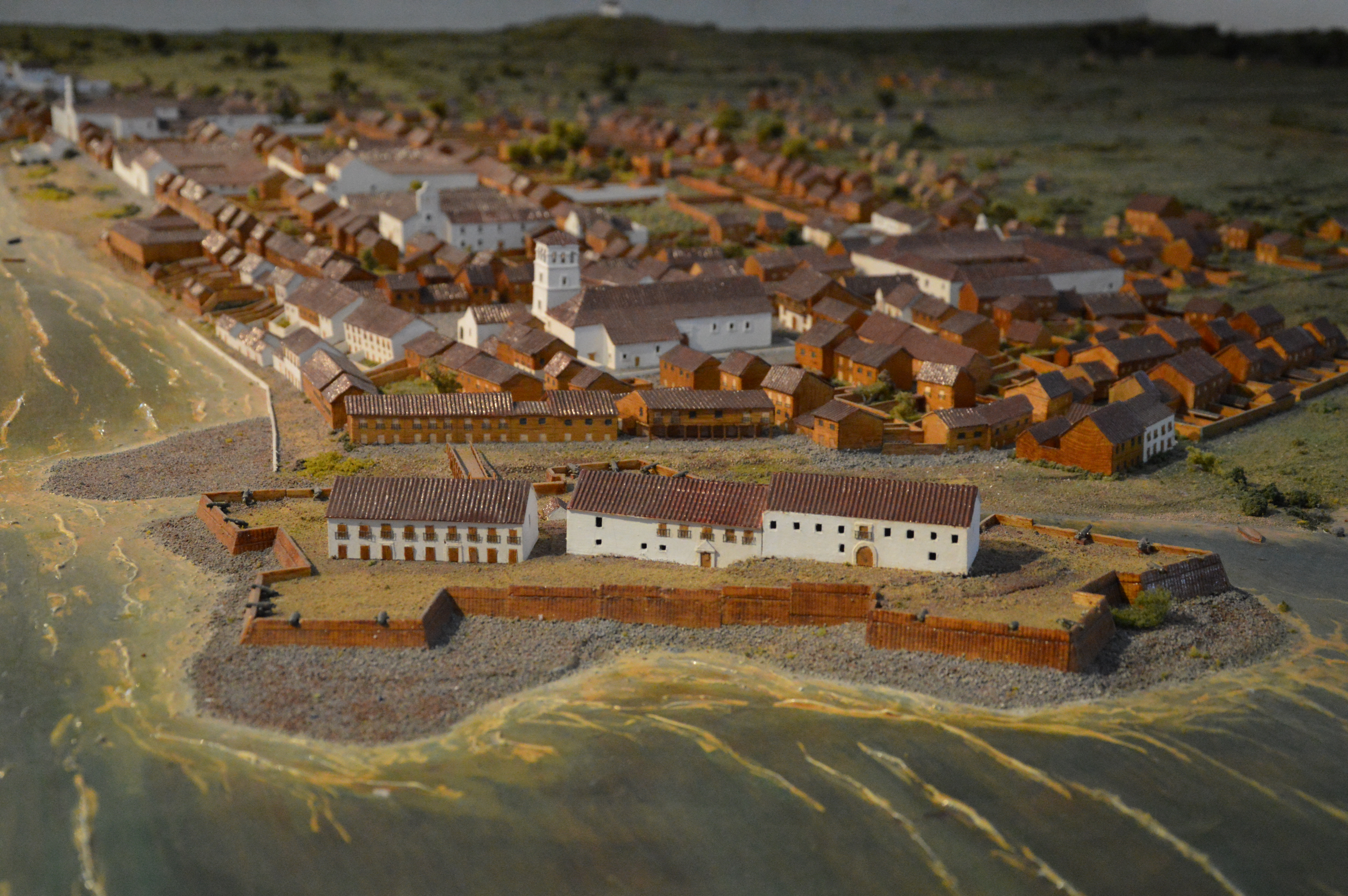
Diorama of Panama

Meanwhile, fires broke out in several quarters of the city, which was helped by the wind spreading it further. Don Juan had ordered the firing of buildings if the Privateers were victorious – the armoury was also blown up with the remains of the powder. The Privateers attempted to douse the fires with mixed success. In the confusion a warehouse of Peruvian wine was discovered but Morgan ordered his men not to drink any wine under the pretext that the inhabitants had poisoned it. It seems more likely that he was concerned that the Spaniards, who still greatly outnumbered his own force, might be encouraged to counterattack if the privateers degenerated into a drunken rabble. Guzman attempted to rally some men but no avail – many fled either to the islands or the hills to escape the privateers.

The next day, Morgan sent 180 men to announce the victory at Fort San Lorenzo. He also had trenches built, mainly around the Church of the Trinity Fathers in case of a Spanish counterattack. The men then consolidated the surrounding area – but were unable to prevent a number of boats leaving the nearby beach, but the privateers saw that they were headed for the nearby islands. As they ventured further down the coast, they captured a barque at La Tasca, which had just come from Paita, and had run aground the day before the battle. Her crew had tried to burn her but the English were quick to capture her intact. It was loaded mostly with maize but also had biscuits, sugar, soap, and linen but also twenty thousand dollars in silver in its hold.

Meanwhile, in the city itself, despite the fires the Privateers were managing to find places where there were hidden riches. Edward Collier, supervised the torture of some of the city's residents; Morgan's fleet surgeon, Richard Browne, later wrote that at Panama, Morgan "was noble enough to the vanquished enemy". Within time the Privateers lowered themselves down wells and rainwater cisterns finding gold and silver objects thrown in for safety. They dug up hastily buried objects in holes in the ground, opened up floorboards, and behind ceilings. They also found a number of shops full of goods, which the Spaniards had left behind. A number of shops were also discovered filled with flour, and iron tools, destined for Peru, such as hoes, axes, anvils, plowshares, and generally tools used in the mines of gold and silver. There was also an abundance of wine, olive oil, and spices. Morgan also formed several units specifically for the looting of the city and its environs. These search parties went as many as twenty miles into the mountains to the North and Northeast of the city. There was no resistance. Most returned two days later with more than one hundred mules loaded with loot and money, and more than two hundred prisoners.

=== Sweep of the Gulf of Panama ===
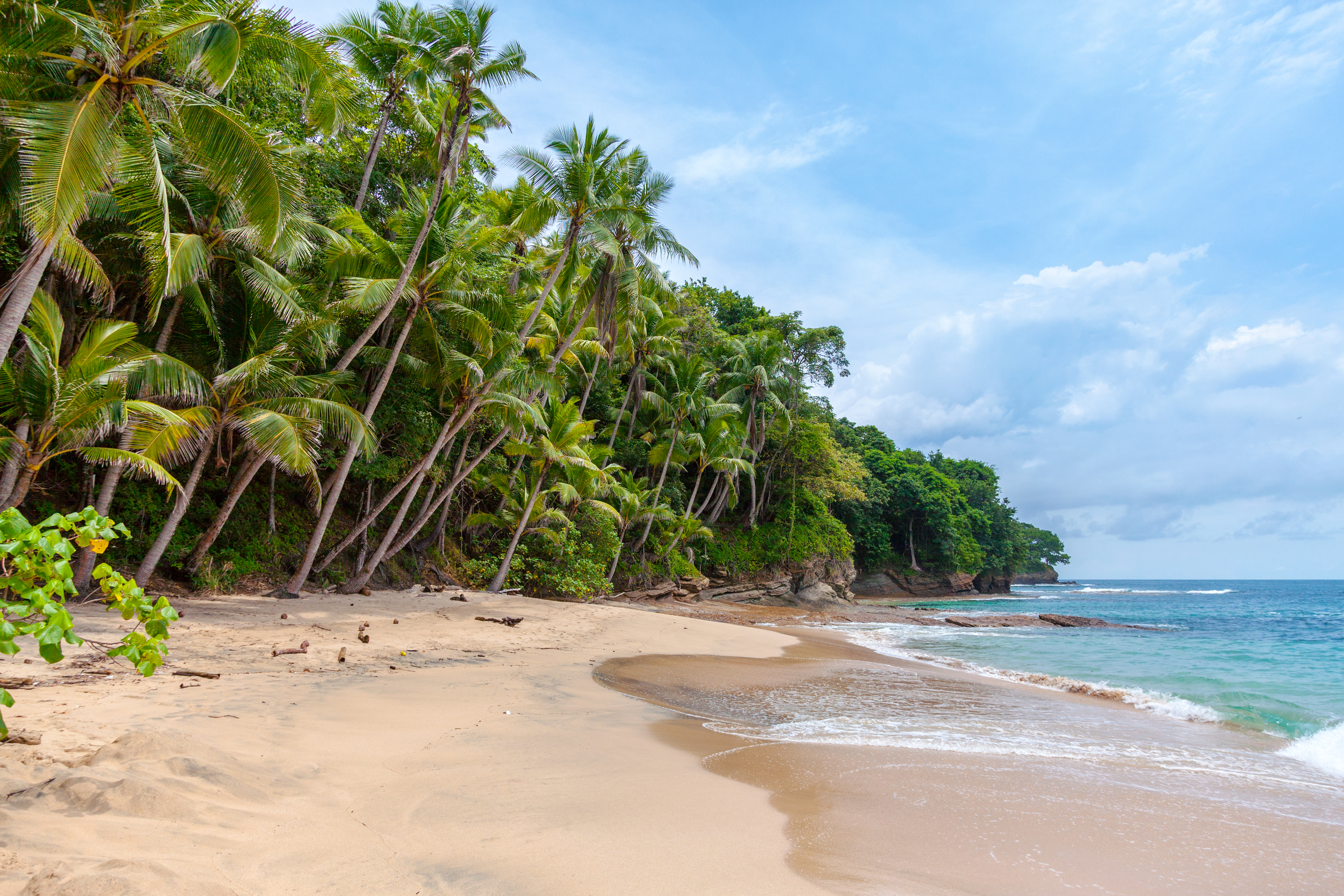
Beach on one of the Pearl Islands – the privateers swept through the islands searching for plunder, where many Spanish residents had hidden

Morgan learnt that the Spanish had sent most of the treasure on to the ships, the Santisima Trinidad under Captain Francisco de Peralta and the San Felipe Neri but it had already sailed off two days before. Morgan then ordered the sweep of nearby islands in Panama bay which he knew had become a haven for many of the Spanish citizens and soldiers having fled the city beforehand. The barque at La Tasca was re-floated and armed, and then put under the command of Robert Searle. Over the next few days, they seized and plundered the islands of Perico, Taboga, and Taboguila and other small inshore islands. At Taboga a number of other boats were seized and the privateers soon had a small flotilla of three armed Barques and a brigantine. They were then able to ravage the Pearl Islands as well as nearby coastal settlements. This venture overall brought in most of the silver during the expedition. Many citizens hiding out on the islands were taken prisoner along with their valuables.

Morgan claimed to have taken as many as 3,000 prisoners from the battle to end of the sacking. Each company was to bring a number of mules, to load the plunder, and take it to "Venta de Cruces", with the aim of returning on the Río Chagres. Much of Panama's wealth was destroyed in the conflagration, although some had been removed by ships, before the privateers arrived.

After nearly three weeks in Panama, Morgan was ready to return. They had collected all the loot they could and it took up a great deal of space. Meanwhile, news had reached the Viceroy of Peru, Pedro de Castro of Morgan's capture of Chagres and subsequent march to Panama. Having already prepared to meet a potential English attack, de Castro sent an expedition of eighteen ships and nearly 3,000 troops. De Castro, however, arrived in Panama too late, Morgan had already evacuated the city.

=== Return to Jamaica ===
On February 24, the privateers began the march back with 175 pack animals laden with treasure. Before doing so the English spiked the remaining guns and demolished the small fort facing seaward.

On their return journey to Venta de Cruces they also brought along 600 prisoners of all ages, most of whom were ransomed before they reached Chagres. This number increased by another 150 as they captured more stragglers by the time they were halfway across the isthmus. After a few days, Morgan arrived at Venta de Cruces without incident and waited for the ransom of the prisoners to be delivered – about 150 Pesos per head or Morgan threatened they be sent to Jamaica. The vast majority was paid and after nine days all were released. In that time the Privateers were able to gather supplies for the return journey which turned out to be far easier. As they set off they noticed that the Chagres was at a level suitable for boats to sail all the way to San Lorenzo. During this time Morgan ordered his entire army to be stripped and searched, himself included, in order to ensure that no one was concealing any valuables from the communal coffers.

The value of treasure Morgan collected during his expedition ranged from 140,000 ($7 million in modern dollars to 400,000 ($20 million) pesos, not counting the precious stones which were afterward sold. The loot was far larger than that taken at Portobello two years previous. Nevertheless, owing to the large army Morgan assembled, the prize-per-man was relatively low. After the deductions were made for the wounded, the surgeons, carpenters and officers, the ordinary privateer received 80 pieces eight ($4,000) which many complained was too low. This caused some discontent and there were accusations, particularly in Exquemelin's memoirs, that Morgan left with the majority of the plunder.

Morgan arrived at San Lorenzo after just two days of travel along the Chagres. On his return there he tried to extort a ransom for the fort as well but when it became clear that no money would be forthcoming, he ordered the town and its fortifications demolished. The French mined the walls, completing its demolition. Morgan then collected the fleet and headed back to Jamaica. The French with eight ships returned to Tortuga, while Morgan and four ships and some 500 men returned to Port Royal in early March to give the news – only to be told of the Madrid peace treaty had been signed and ratified.

== Aftermath ==
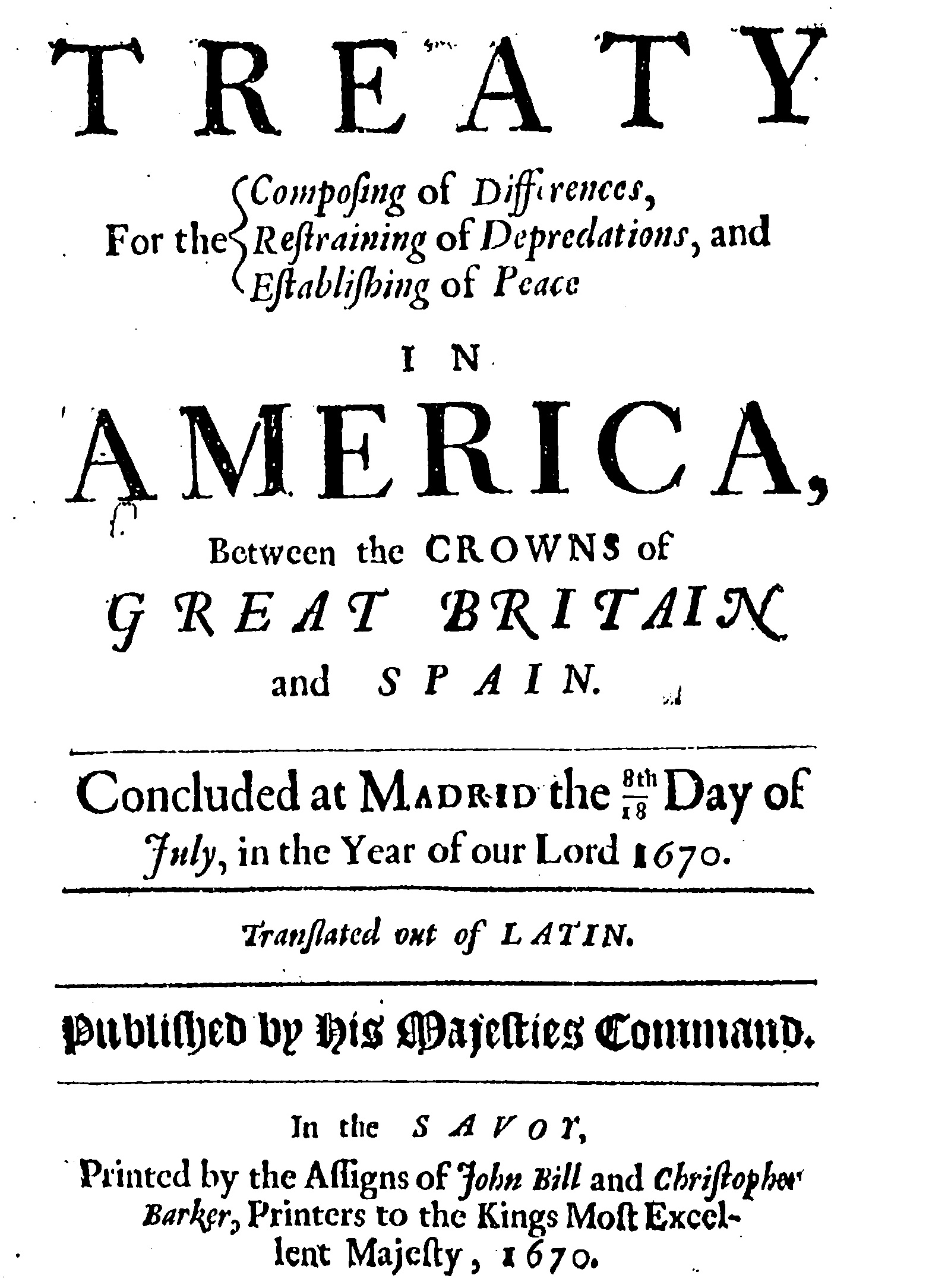
Treaty of Madrid document signed in 1670

The attack sent waves of shock across the Spanish empire and many settlements and towns remained on edge, despite the peace. Morgan's provocative actions helped force the Spanish to renounce their exclusive rights in the Americas. Morgan was not aware that England and Spain had signed a peace treaty in September the previous year; he only received news from the Governor of Cartagena. By the time news of the peace had arrived in Jamaica, Panama had already burnt. The sack of Panama marked the end of the policy of piracy sponsored as a matter of government policy. Nevertheless, the destruction so soon after the signing of the treaty thus led to a crisis in international affairs between England and Spain. In the treaty the Spanish recognised England's colonies in the Americas which was a major concession. In previous treaties, Spain had always insisted that the New World west of Brazil belonged to it alone. For this recognition Charles II agreed to suppress privateering in the Caribbean and cease further letters of Marque. In return, Spain agreed to permit English ships freedom of movement. The generous terms of the treaty given to England put Morgan in a serious position.

The Spanish ambassador delivered a violent protest to Lord Arlington. Charles II formally apologised, under the pretence of ignorance of the attack, but Spain demanded that Morgan be challenged. Charles also sent out a new Governor Thomas Lynch under orders to arrest both Modyford and Morgan who were to be sent in chains to London to be tried for piracy. Both were supposed to have been incarcerated in the Tower of London but instead, when Morgan arrived in London for trial he was hailed a hero by the public. Morgan was at liberty throughout his time in London, and the political mood changed in his favour. The Earl of Arlington asked him to write a memorandum for the King on how to improve Jamaica's defences. Morgan was never charged with an offence – he gave informal evidence to the Lords of Trade and Plantations and proved he had no knowledge of the Treaty of Madrid prior to his attack on Panama, and was found not guilty. He was 'released' and lived in London comfortably for three years, before returning to the Caribbean in 1675 as Deputy Governor of Jamaica. He was knighted the same year and then retired from privateering, and married the daughter of one of the island's leading officers.

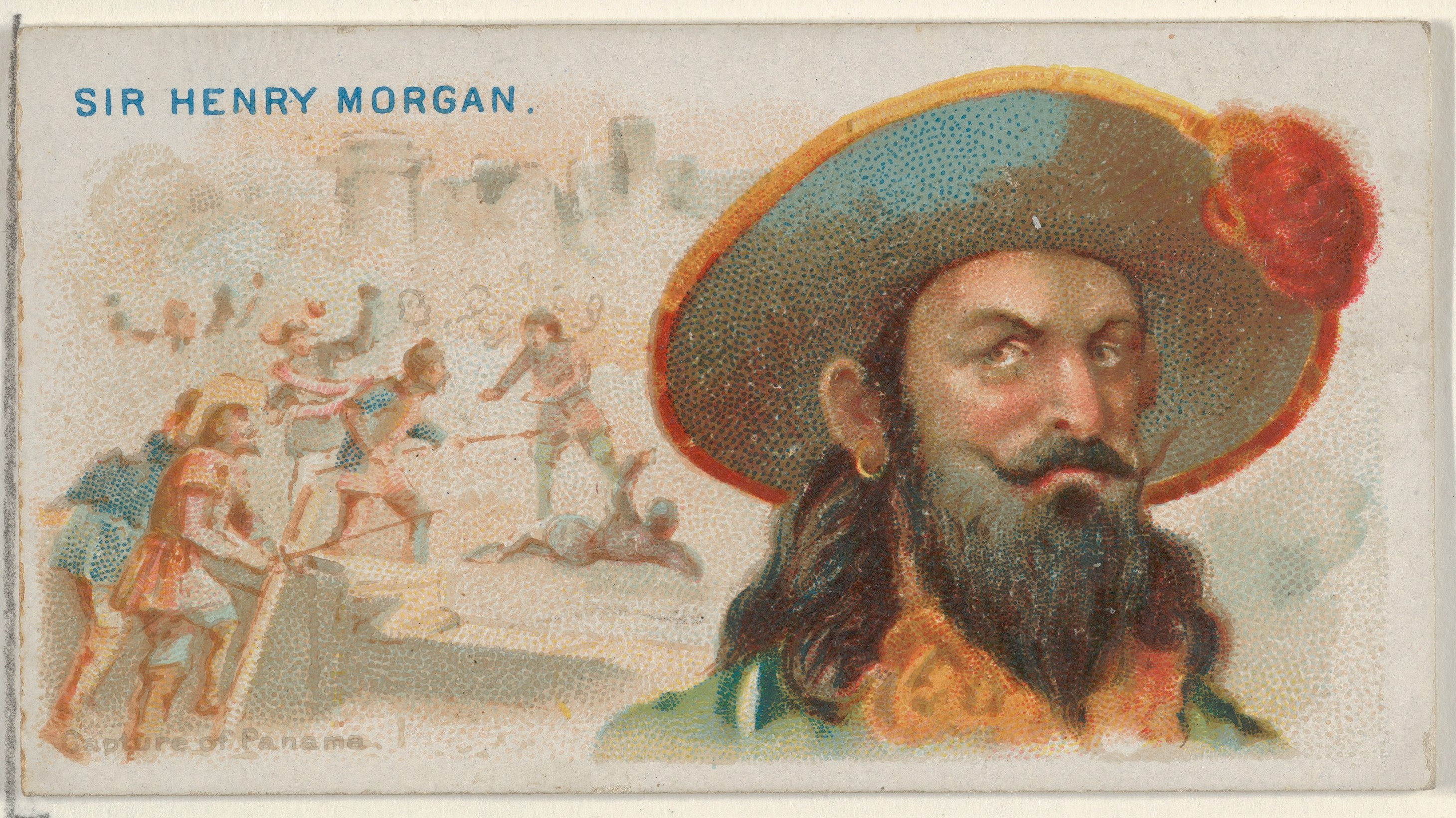
Sir Henry Morgan, Capture of Panama, from the Pirates of the Spanish Main series (N19) for Allen & Ginter Cigarettes MET DP835022

The Privateers themselves disappointed at the lack of a fair share went their own separate ways many not returning to Jamaica until July. Even then they did not stay long, the vast majority wanted to carry on their piratical lifestyle but instead ended up on the Mosquito Coast to take up the cutting of logwood for dye. This in itself would end up becoming a debate between England and Spain as to whether this was a legal occupation.

Later in 1670 rumours of a foreign invasion prompted the viceroy of Peru, De Castro to order all Pacific ports to be put in a thorough state of preparedness. Don Pérez de Guzmán would be dismissed for the second time by the viceroy and was imprisoned in Lima for the defeat as well as being held responsible for the destruction. He was held on a residencia – charges were made but Guzman was exonerated. He returned to Madrid but died a heartbroken man three years later.

The burning of Panama was costly to the Spanish – some 11 to 18 million pesos overall and the loss was a systematic failure on a huge scale. A portion of the costs in rebuilding the city would have to be borne by the Spanish Crown. When the Spanish citizens came back to a ruined Panama they only found the convent and a few shacks along its Northern fringe had escaped its destruction. Disease then spread amongst the inhabitants with 3,000 out of the 10,000 succumbing over the following months. Panama, however, was never rebuilt, so a new settlement instead was to be built under the supervision of new Governor Antonio Fernández de Córdoba, in a location approximately 5 miles (8 km) southwest of the original in 1673. It soon merged with the older city and the location is now known as the Casco Viejo (Old Quarter) of the city. The ruins are still visible, and it has been a World Heritage Site since 1997.

=== Ruins of Panama Viejo (old Panama) ===
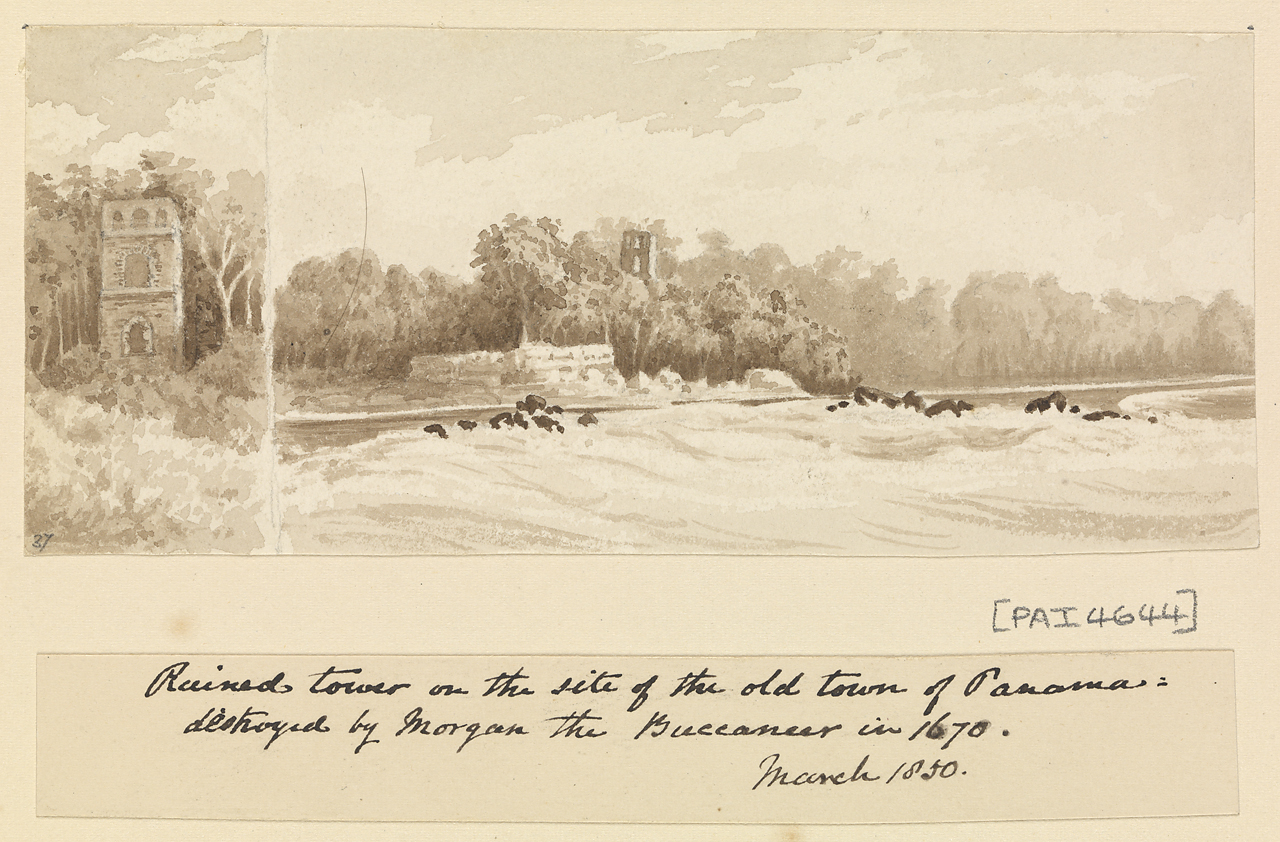
Edward Gennys Fanshawe 1850 sketch of the site of the old town of Panama

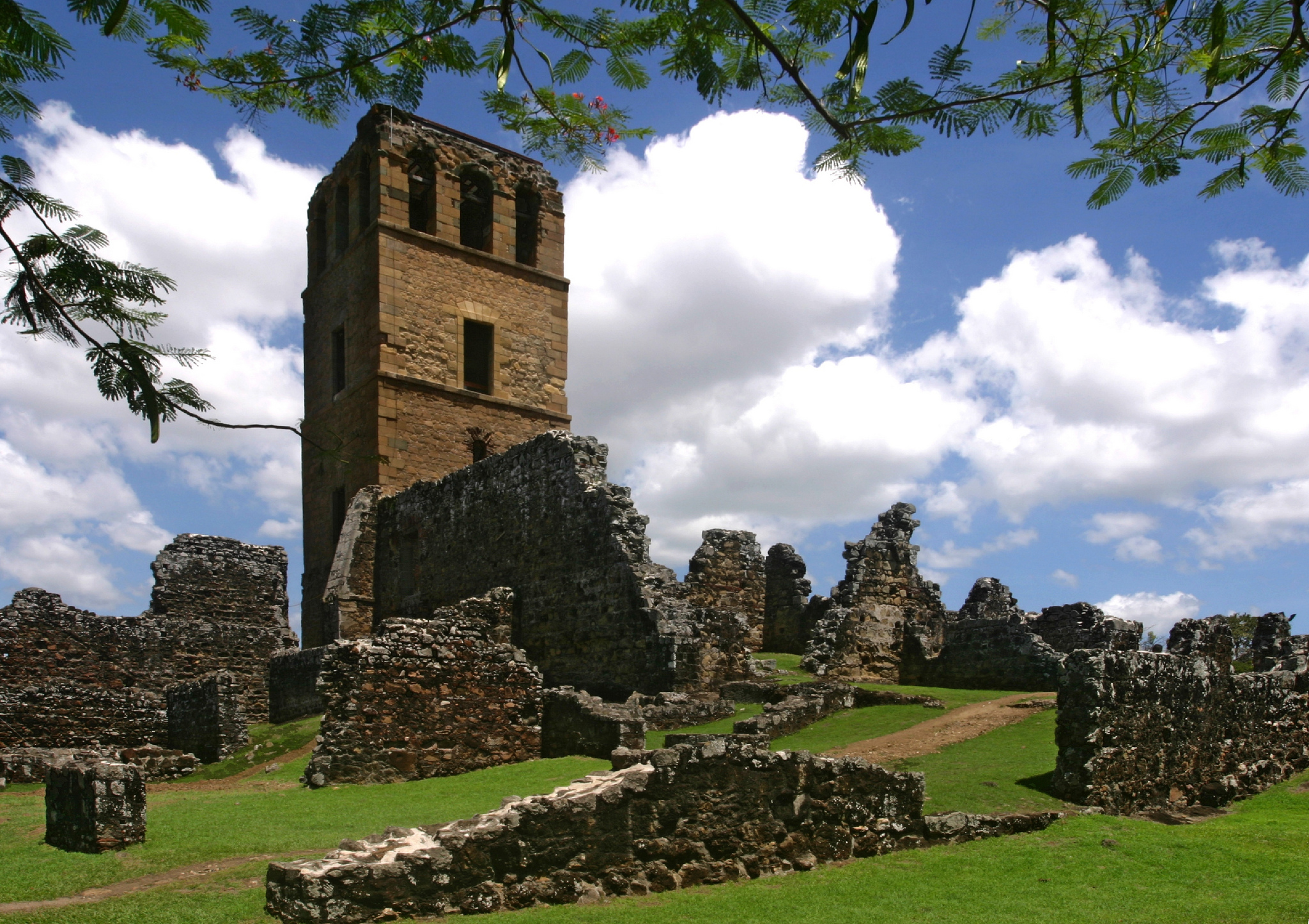
Catedral de Nuestra Senora de la Ascension

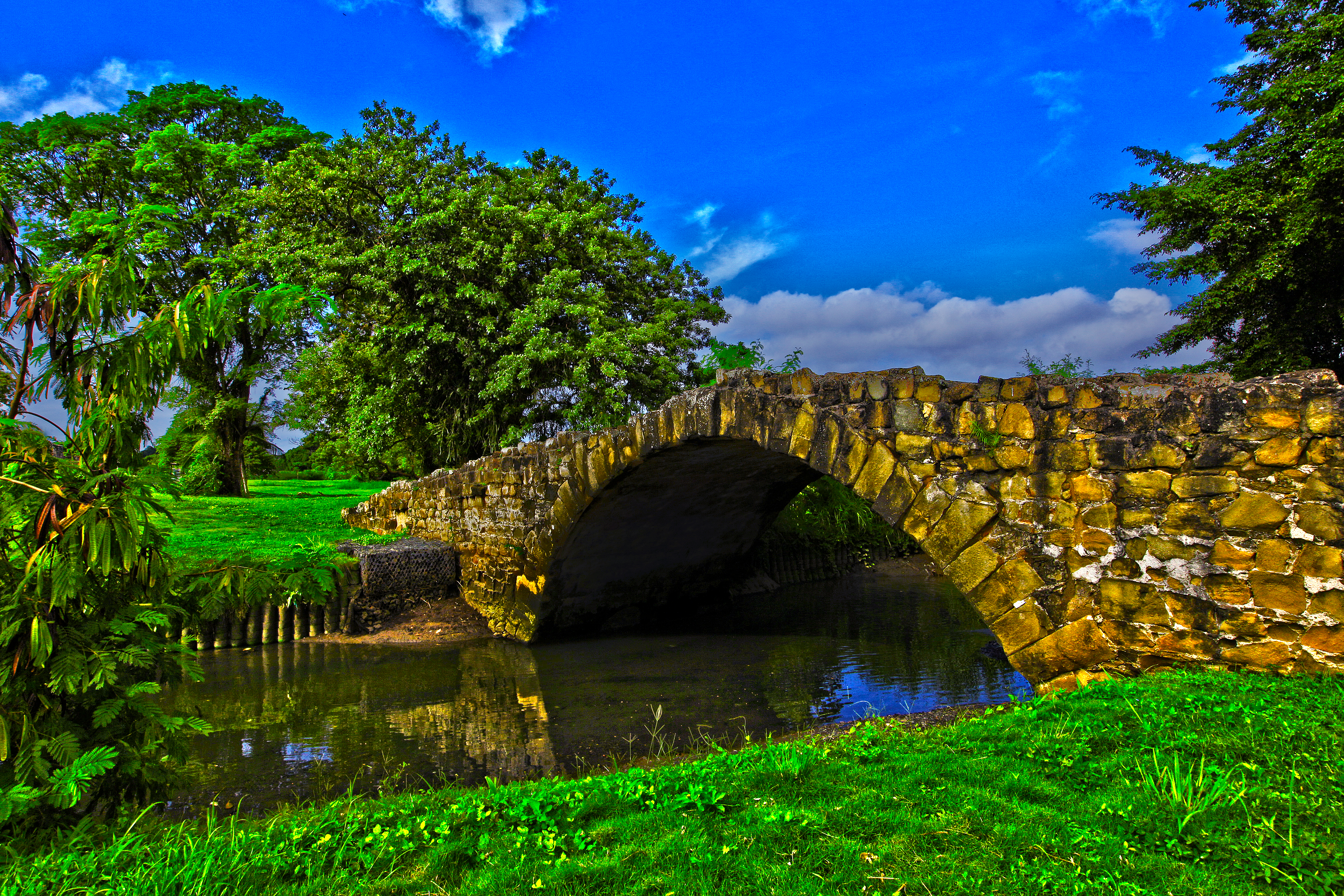
The Puente del Rey

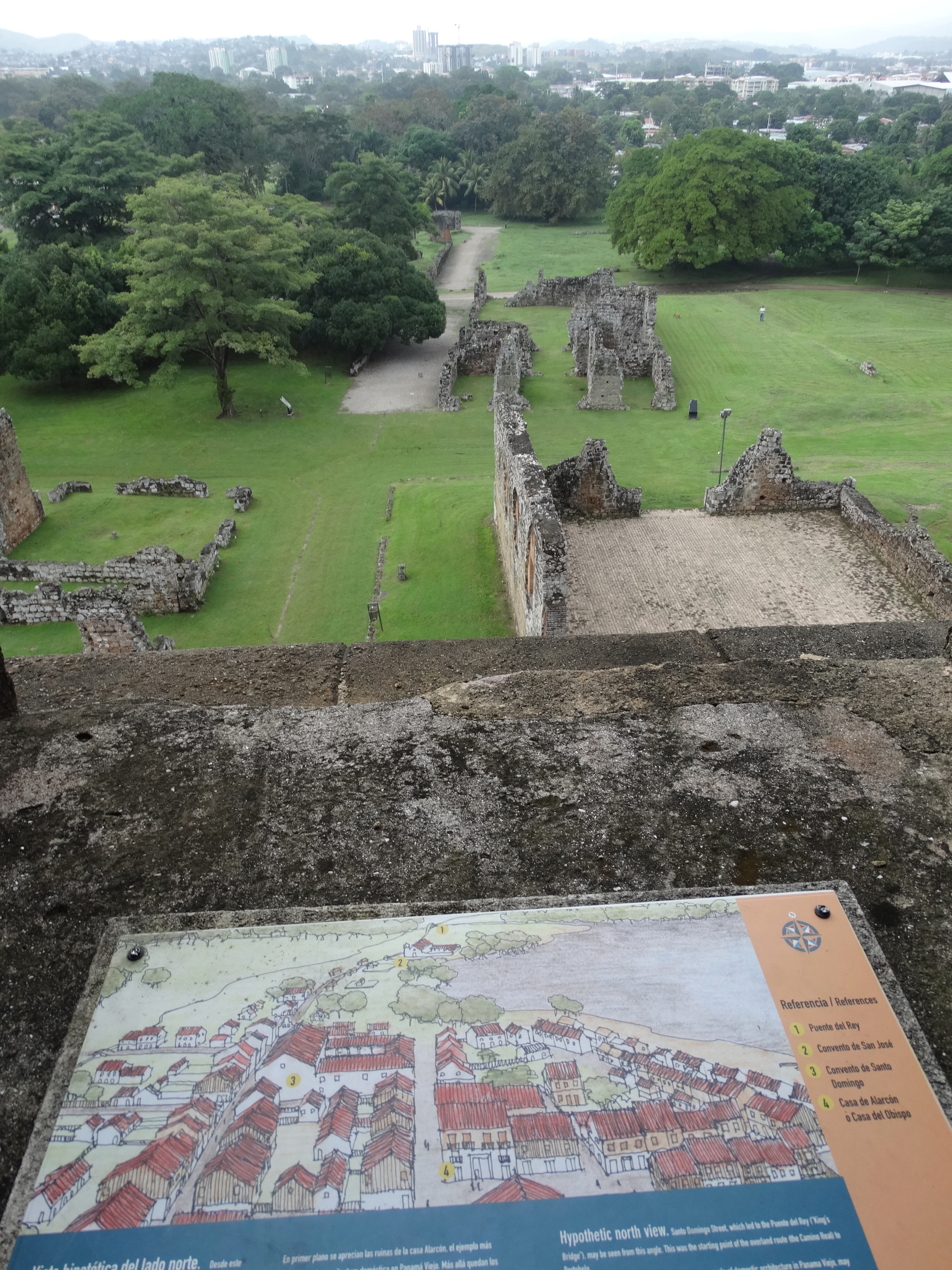
View of the ruins of Panama Viejo from the Cathedral

== Legacy ==
- Morgan's ship the Satisfaction lays just off Lajas reef where it sank. The wreck was discovered by a team from the Texas State University in July 2011.
- In 2014 the expedition was an inspiration for the drinks company Diageo who owned Captain Morgan rum to launch a limited edition 'Captain Morgan 1671'.

== See also ==
- Francis Drake's expedition of 1572–1573
- Drake's Assault on Panama

== Bibliography ==
- Allen, H. R. (1976). Buccaneer: Admiral Sir Henry Morgan. London: Arthur Baker. ISBN 978-0-213-16569-7.
- Breverton, Terry (2005). Admiral Sir Henry Morgan: The Greatest Buccaneer of them all. Pencader, Carmarthenshire: Glyndŵr Publishing. ISBN 978-1-903529-17-1.
- Cordingly, David (2006) [1996]. Under the Black Flag: The Romance and Reality of Life Among the Pirates. London: Random House. ISBN 978-0-8129-7722-6.
- Davenport, Frances Gardiner; Paullin, Charles Oscar, eds. (2004). European Treaties Bearing on the History of the United States and Its Dependencies: Issue 254. The Lawbook Exchange, Ltd. ISBN 9781584774228.
- Delgado, James P. (2019). A Shipwrecked History from Antiquity to the Cold War. Oxford University Press. ISBN 9780190888015.
- Earle, Peter (2007). The Sack of Panamá: Captain Morgan and the Battle for the Caribbean. New York: Thomas Dunne Books. ISBN 978-0-312-36142-6.
- Gerhard, Peter (1990). Pirates of the Pacific. University of Nebraska Press. ISBN 9780803270305.
- Gosse, Phillip (2007) [1932]. The History of Piracy. Mineola, NY: Dover Publications. ISBN 978-0-486-46183-0.
- Konstam, Angus (2008). Scourge of the Seas: Buccaneers, Pirates and Privateers. Osprey Publishing. ISBN 9781844061136.
- Lane, Kris E. (1999). Blood and Silver: A History of Piracy in the Caribbean and Central America. Signal Books. ISBN 9781902669014.
- Latimer, Jon (2009). Buccaneers of the Caribbean: How Piracy Forged an Empire. Harvard University Press. ISBN 978-0-674-03403-7.
- Little, Benerson (2007). The Buccaneer's Realm: Pirate Life on the Spanish Main, 1674–1688. Potomac Books, Inc. ISBN 9781612343617.
- Marley, David (2010). Pirates of the Americas, Volume 1. ABC-CLIO. ISBN 9781598842012.
- Mirza, Rocky M. (2007). The Rise and Fall of the American Empire: A Re-Interpretation of History, Economics and Philosophy: 1492-2006. Trafford Publishing. ISBN 9781425113834.
- Paxman, Jeremy (2011). Empire. London: Viking. ISBN 978-0-670-91957-4.
- Pestana, Carla Gardina (2017). The English Conquest of Jamaica: Oliver Cromwell's Bid for Empire. Harvard University Press. ISBN 9780674737310.
- Petrovich, Sandra Marie (2001). Henry Morgan's Raid on Panama Geopolitics and Colonial Ramifications, 1669-1674. Lewiston, N.Y.: E. Mellen Press. ISBN 9780773474222. OCLC 45835530.
- Pope, Dudley (1978). The Buccaneer King: The Biography of the Notorious Sir Henry Morgan 1635–1688x (in the UK, as Harry Morgan's Way). New York: Dodd, Mead & Co. ISBN 978-0-396-07566-0.
- Sullivan, Laura L. (2014). Sir Henry Morgan. Cavendish Square Publishing. ISBN 9781502602022.
- Talty, Stephan (2007). Empire of Blue Water: Henry Morgan and the Pirates Who Ruled the Caribbean Waves. London: Simon & Schuster. ISBN 978-1-4165-0293-7.
- Thomas, Graham (2014). The Buccaneer King: The Story of Captain Henry Morgan (Kindle ed.). Barnsley, South Yorkshire: Pen & Sword Maritime. ISBN 978-1-4738-3522-1.
- Walton, Timothy R. (2002). The Spanish Treasure Fleets. Pineapple Press Inc. ISBN 9781561642618.
