= William Beeston (disambiguation) =

William Beeston (1606?–1682) was an actor.

William Beeston may also refer to:

- William Beeston (MP) (died 1638), English politician
- William Beeston (colonial administrator) (1636–?), lieutenant-governor of Jamaica
