= James Lamb (orientalist) =

English orientalist

James Lamb (or Lambe; 1599 – 18 October 1664), was an English clergyman and orientalist.

Lamb was baptised on 2 February 1598/9 in the parish of All Saints' Church, Oxford, the son of Richard Lamb. He was educated at Magdalen College School, and entered Brasenose College, Oxford in 1613, graduating B.A. 1615, M.A. 1619 (incorporated M.A. at Cambridge 1628), D.D. (from St Mary Hall, Oxford) 1660.

He was chaplain to Thomas Wriothesley, 4th Earl of Southampton. In the church, he held the following livings:

- Rector of Botley, Hampshire, 1639–60
- Canon of Westminster Abbey, 1660–64
- Rector of Kings Worthy, Hampshire, 1661
- Rector of St Andrew's, Holborn, London, 1662–64

He died on 18 October 1664, and was buried on 20 October in Westminster Abbey.

He bequeathed many of his books to the library of Westminster Abbey; the Bodleian Library holds manuscripts by him, including a three-volume grammar of Arabic.

== Family ==
Lamb was married to Elizabeth Beeston (daughter of Arthur Bromfield MP and widow of William Beeston MP). They had no children, but he was step-father to Sir William Beeston, lieutenant-governor of Jamaica, and Henry Beeston, Headmaster of Winchester College and Warden of New College, Oxford.
