= Francis Witherborn =

English buccaneer, privateer and pirate

- Occupation: Pirate
- Years active: 1670–1672
- Known for: Association with Henry Morgan
- Piratical career
- Base of operations: Caribbean
- Commands: Charity

Francis Witherborn (Note: Last name also Weatherborn, Weatherbourne, or Witherborne; various relatives spelled the name Wedderburn.) (fl. 1670–1672) was an English buccaneer, privateer, and pirate active in the Caribbean. He is best known for his brief association with Henry Morgan.

== History ==
Witherborn initially sailed with Henry Morgan's fleet in attacks against Spanish cities in Central America. He was part of Morgan's flotilla during their 1670 assault on Panama along with a number of other prominent buccaneers. By 1671 new Jamaican Governor Thomas Lynch moved to curtail privateering against the Spanish, offering pardons to privateers who surrendered and hunting down those who refused.

After parting with Morgan, Witherborn took command of the barque Charity, formerly commanded by Dutch corsair David Marten. Witherborn sailed with Dutch pirate Jelles de Lecat ("Captain Yhallahs") for a time before partnering with French captain Dumangle (Note: First name unknown, last name also De Mangle or Du Mangles.)—also a veteran of Morgan's campaigns—and his ship Le Diable Volant (Flying Devil). The two signed articles of agreement confirming their intention to go privateering together. They raided Spanish shipping and attacked towns on the Cuban coast through 1671, committing "great violence against the Spaniards".

In early 1672 Lynch sent Major William Beeston (who would later succeed Lynch as Governor) in HMS Assistance to hunt down the remaining rogue privateers. Aided by former buccaneer John Morrice, Beeston chased Lecat (who had entered into Spanish service) but could not catch him. Instead he captured Witherborn and Dumangle. They were imprisoned, tried, and convicted. Witherborn protested that his first mate held the real power, and that Articles he signed with Dumangle were just a ruse, but Lynch, Beeston, and the other judges were not swayed: "Upon consideration of the whole matter all were of opinion that having committed piracy and broken the articles of peace, Captain Witherborn ought to suffer death according to the law."

Jamaican officials balked at executing them; when the Spanish too refused to execute Dumangle, he was released for fear of reprisals from French pirates in Santo Domingo and Tortuga. Witherborn was sent back to England as a prisoner alongside Henry Morgan. While Morgan was pardoned and released, and eventually became a Lieutenant Governor, Witherborn was instead pressed into Royal Navy service.

== See also ==
- Jan Erasmus Reyning – Another Dutch buccaneer who sailed with Lecat and who also evaded Beeston.
