= Jacob Fackman =

17th-century English pirate

Jacob Fackman (fl. 1662–1666) was an English buccaneer and pirate active in the Caribbean. (Note: His last name is often given as Jackman, rarely Rackman. At least one source claims he may have been Dutch-born as Jakob Fokman.) He is best known for attacking the Spanish alongside Henry Morgan, John Morris, and David Marteen.

== History ==
Fackman may have arrived in Jamaica with Cromwell's 1655 invasion force alongside fellow future buccaneer (and partner) Thomas Freeman. Before moving to Jamaica, Fackman was a resident of Barbados. He is recorded as employing several indentured English and Welsh servants there as early as 1655.

Fackman first took out a privateering commission against the Spanish from the Governor of Jamaica in late 1662. In his frigate Cagway (Note: This should not be confused with the ship Cagway captained by Robert Searle, which operated in the same area at the same time. "Cagway" was the original name of their hometown of Port Royal.) he joined Christopher Myngs and other buccaneers in sacking Santiago de Cuba, and was probably still with Myngs when he attacked Campeche in early 1663. With a renewed commission in late 1663 he sailed again for Spanish territory.

The next year he joined with John Morris, Henry Morgan, David Marteen, and Thomas Freeman to raid Tabasco, Mexico and sack Villahermosa. While they looted the town the Spanish seized their anchored ships. After repulsing a Spanish attack (“in which the Spaniards were beaten off without loss of a man”) they captured a few ships and proceeded through Central America. Moving through Honduras and Nicaragua, they enlisted the aid of local tribes to capture Granada, which had been looted by Edward Mansvelt only a year earlier. Approaching the garrison undetected thanks to the help of native guides, the buccaneers “fired a volley, overturned 18 great guns in the Parada Place, took the sergeant-major's house, wherein were all their arms and ammunition, secured in the Great Church 300 of the best men prisoners, [an] abundance of which were churchmen, plundered for 16 hours, discharged the prisoners, sunk all the boats, and so came away.”

The group returned to Port Royal (in their own ships, which they had recaptured) in summer 1665, minus Marteen, who was Dutch and wary of staying in an English port after learning that the Second Anglo-Dutch War had broken out. New Jamaican Governor Thomas Modyford was leery of the buccaneers – the English were trying to keep peace with Spain at the time – but they protested that “having been out 22 months and hearing nothing of the cessation betwixt the King and the Spaniard” they had not known that Spanish targets were now off-limits and had been operating under Windsor's now two-year-old commissions.

Fackman's further activities are not recorded. Modyford's eventual successor William Beeston wrote of them the following summer, “Captain Fackman and others arrived from the taking of the towns of Tabasco and Villahermosa, in the Bay of Mexico, and although there had been peace with the Spaniards not long since proclaimed, yet the privateers went out and in, as if there had been an actual war, without commission.”

== See also ==
- Laurens de Graaf, Nicholas van Hoorn, and Michiel Andrieszoon – three other Dutch buccaneers active in the same area shortly after Fackman.
