= David Marteen =

- Occupations: Privateer and pirate
- Years active: 1651–1672
- Known for: Joining Henry Morgan’s raids against Spanish strongholds in present-day Mexico and Nicaragua
- Piratical career
- Base of operations: Caribbean
- Commands: Charity

David Marteen (Note: Last name spelled variously Marteen, Martien, Martin, Marten, Martyn, or Marteens.) (fl. 1651–1672) was a Dutch privateer and pirate best known for joining Henry Morgan’s raids against Spanish strongholds in present-day Mexico and Nicaragua. He is also the subject of a popular buried treasure legend.

== History ==
Marteen had been active in the Caribbean as early as 1651, and by 1663 had accepted a commission from Jamaican Governor Thomas to sail against the Spanish. In his barque Charity he may have joined Christopher Myngs for raids on Campeche, ignoring the cessation of hostilities between England and Spain.

Although raids against the Spanish were prohibited under British law, he agreed in 1664 to join Henry Morgan's expedition and set sail from Port Royal along with John Morris and Captains Thomas Freeman and Jacob Fackman (or Jackman) under new letters of marque issued by Thomas’s successor Governor Thomas Modyford.

After reaching the Grijalva River, Marteen and the others led their men 50 miles overland and successfully looted Tabasco and Villa Hermosa in a surprise raid. Returning to the coast, they discovered a Spanish patrol had captured their ships; after a brief battle, they managed to retake their two barques. They raided up the Yucatan, through Honduras, and into Nicaragua where they sacked Granada. Jackman and the others made their way back to Jamaica, arriving in Port Royal in late 1665.

Marteen, however, did not. The Anglo-Dutch War was underway, and as the only Dutch commander in the expedition, Marteen feared he would be imprisoned if he stayed at Port Royal. After a brief visit he sailed to Tortuga by way of Guadeloupe and gave French officials information on Spanish defenses. He may have joined fellow Dutchman Edward Mansvelt to raid Costa Rica, and in 1666 again served under Modyford as a privateer. Modyford wrote, “lately David Marteen, the best man of Tortuga, that has two frigates at sea, had promised to bring in both.”

After 1668 he may have briefly joined Robert Searle to raid St. Augustine, though the Charity was busy hauling logwood. Modyford’s successor Thomas Lynch wrote in 1671 that “there are but three privateers out, one captain Diego, and Yhallahs and Martin.” The following year Charity was captured by John Morris and William Beeston, but by this time Francis Witherborn was in command: Charity had “been formerly Captain David Martyn’s man o’ war.” Marteen was still recorded as living in Port Royal as of 1672.

== Buried Treasure ==
Local legends in Connecticut hold that Marteen sailed up the Farmington River near Salmon Brook in 1655, setting up a small camp. When accosted by locals, he and his buccaneers sailed away after burying an enormous amount of treasure they had looted in the Caribbean from the captured Spanish galleon Neptune. Other versions of the legend claim Marteen's corsairs established a small settlement which was wiped out during King Philip’s War' in 1676. Twentieth century treasure hunters claimed to have found carved stones used by Marteen’s crew to mark the burial site but the treasure itself, if real, has not been located. (Note: Accounts of the legend – that after burying his treasure Marteen was killed at sea in 1656, that the Spanish galleon was named Neptune, that the treasure was worth over $20M - do not agree with known information about Marteen.)

== See also ==
- Laurens de Graaf, Nicholas van Hoorn, and Michiel Andrieszoon – three other Dutch buccaneers active in the same area shortly after Marteen.
