= Henry Beeston =

English educator

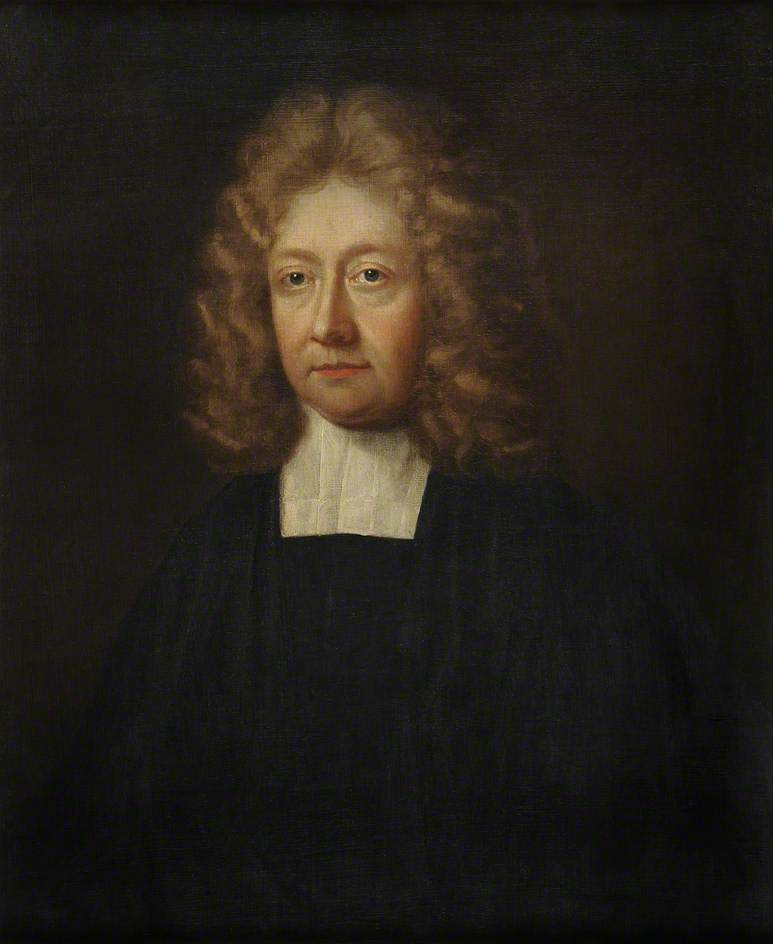
Henry Beeston

Henry Beeston (c. 1631 – 12 May 1701) was an English educator.

Beeston was the eldest son of William Beeston MP and his wife Elizabeth, daughter of Arthur Bromfield MP. William Beeston used the coat of arms of the Cheshire Beeston family but his connections are obscure. William Beeston died in 1638, and Elizabeth remarried the priest and Arabic scholar James Lamb. Henry Beeston's younger brother Sir William Beeston was lieutenant-governor of Jamaica.

Beeston was educated at Winchester College, where he gained a scholarship aged 13 in 1644, and New College, Oxford. In May 1648, he was among the members of New College who refused to submit to the parliamentary visitation. He became a Fellow in 1649, graduating BCL in 1653, DCL in 1660/1. He was admitted to Gray's Inn in 1651.

He was appointed headmaster of Lord Williams's School, Thame in 1655; served as headmaster of Winchester College from 1658 until 1679; and as Warden of New College, Oxford from 1679 until his death. In the church, he became rector of Over Wallop in 1662, and was a prebendary of Winchester Cathedral from 1664 to 1695.

While at Oxford, Beeston wrote a verse in English and Latin on Anne Greene, who survived execution by hanging in Oxford in 1650. On the Restoration in 1660, he wrote a poem in praise of Charles II. After the Glorious Revolution of 1689, despite having previously compared James II to Apollo, he wrote a Latin tribute to William III (calling him "the true Apollo of the world, not he who pretends to be"), and a long poem, The Queens Arrivall, celebrating Mary II.

Beeston married Elizabeth, daughter of William Burt, his predecessor as headmaster of Thame and Winchester.
