= William Beeston (MP) =

William Beeston (died December 1638) was an English politician who served as member of parliament for Yarmouth (Isle of Wight).

Beeston matriculated at St John's College, Cambridge as a sizar in 1605, graduating B.A. 1608/9, M.A. 1612, and becoming a Fellow of St John's in 1610.

While at St John's, Beeston served as tutor to James, Lord Wriothesley, heir of the 3rd Earl of Southampton, accompanying Wriothesley on a European tour in 1622–3. Southampton, as Captain of the Isle of Wight, nominated Beeston as MP for Yarmouth in 1624. There is no record of him in parliamentary proceedings. In September 1624, Beeston accompanied Southampton and Wriothesley to the Netherlands, where Southampton had been appointed a commander in the Eighty Years' War. Southampton and Wriothesley both died of fever in December. Beeston then became tutor to Southampton's younger son, who succeeded as the 4th Earl of Southampton, living on Southampton's estate at Titchfield. He died in December 1638, and was buried at Titchfield.

== Family ==
Beeston married Elizabeth, daughter of Arthur Bromfield MP, and had two sons and five daughters. The sons were Henry Beeston, Warden of New College, Oxford, and Sir William Beeston, lieutenant-governor of Jamaica.

After Beeston's death, Elizabeth married James Lamb.
