= Philip Fitzgerald (pirate) =

Irish pirate and privateer

- Other name: Felipe Geraldino
- Occupations: Pirate and privateer
- Years active: 1672-1675
- Piratical career
- Type: Guarda costa
- Allegiance: Spanish
- Base of operations: Caribbean

Philip Fitzgerald (fl. 1672–1675, alias Felipe Geraldino or Philip Hellen) was an Irish pirate and privateer who served the Spanish in the Caribbean.

== History ==
Fitzgerald obtained a commission as a Spanish privateer (guarda costa) out of Havana in 1672. Late that year he captured the English ship Humility under Matthew Fox, abusing the captured crew until several of them died. Fox testified that when Fitzgerald was asked why he was so barbaric to English captives, he exclaimed: “giving no reason but that his countrymen were ill-used by the English 24 years ago, and he should never be satisfied with English blood, but could drink it as freely as water when he was adry; and he had commission to sink or take all ships trading from Jamaica, and kill those.”

Early in 1673 he captured the 130-ton logwood hauler Virgin of Edmund Cooke, putting him and his crew in a longboat with no provisions. Cooke survived, and incensed at losing a second ship to the Spanish some time later, finally turned to piracy against the Spanish. Fitzgerald captured more English ships near Campeche in late 1673 alongside Jelles de Lecat (“Yellows”) and Jan Erasmus Reyning, the three of them accounting for more than 40 captures.

Finally in early 1674 both English officials and King Charles II issued proclamations offering pardons to Lecat and Fitzgerald if they surrendered and abandoned the Spanish, but calling for their death or capture if they refused: “and in regard Captains Yellows and Fitzgerald, two of his Majesty's subjects, appeared to be the chief instruments of said depredations, That a Proclamation be issued for recalling his Majesty's subjects from the service of any foreign Prince between the tropics in America, with promise of pardon if they render themselves within a convenient time; and that the Governor of Jamaica receive speedy order for securing both said persons if found so offending after the time limited within his Government, and cause them to be sent prisoners to England.”

Fitzgerald sailed his 12-gun man-of-war into Havana with yet another captured English prize ship in summer 1674, this time with English prisoners hung from the yardarms. After depositions regarding more of Fitzgerald's crimes came to light, and after Spain refused to compensate some of his English victims, in September 1675 the order was given to hunt him down: "Ordered, that Mr. Attorney-General hasten the Proclamation for bringing in the head of Fitzgerald the Pirate from the Havana." Fitzgerald's ultimate fate is unknown.

In 1687 navigator and explorer William Dampier was in the Luconia Shoals, part of a crew which had mutinied and abandoned buccaneer Charles Swan at Mindanao in the Philippines. He encountered several pirates who had also been part of Swan's crew; they reported meeting "an Irishman who went by the name of John Fitz-Gerald, a person that spoke Spanish very well." This Fitzgerald "had in this time gotten a Spanish Mestiza woman to wife, and a good dowry with her" and "being an Irish Roman Catholic, and having the Spanish language, he had a great advantage of all his consorts; and he alone lived well there of them all." Whether this was a later adventure of Philip Fitzgerald is not certain.

== See also ==
- John Bear, another Englishman who sailed for the Spaniards as a guarda costa privateer.
