= John Morris (pirate) =

English buccaneer

John Morris (fl. 1663–1672, last name occasionally "Morrice") was an English buccaneer active in the Caribbean during the 1660s and early-1670s. His son, John Morris the Younger, held a command of his own ship during his father's later expeditions against Portobelo and Maracaibo. John Morris the Younger was one of the commanders killed in an explosion during a party on board Henry Morgan's flagship in 1670.

== Biography ==
Serving with Admiral Christopher Myngs during his campaign against Spain in the West Indies during the early 1660s, he would become associated with many future prominent privateers of the era and later bought four captured prizes from Myngs.

One of the early buccaneers participating in the expeditions against Spanish strongholds in Mexico and Nicaragua in late 1663 and early 1664, Morris sailed with Henry Morgan, David Marteen, Captain Jackman, Captain Kelly and Captain Freeman against Spanish strongholds in the Caribbean under privateering commissions granted by then governor Thomas Modyford.

Arriving off the coast of Mexico, Morris and the others anchored their ships at the mouth of the Grijalva River and proceeded to march 50 miles inland to the capital of the Tabasco Province, Villahermosa, taking the Spanish stronghold completely by surprise. Returning to the coast, the fleet had been captured by a Spanish patrol and, stealing two barques and four Indian canoes, Morris and the other sailed south looting a village before their arrival at present day Trujillo, Honduras. Sailing off with a ship anchored in the town harbor, they eventually hid the captured vessel at the mouth of the San Juan river and travelled nearly 100 miles upriver to Lake Nicaragua where they raided the city of Granada before returning to Port Royal, Jamaica in November 1665.

In 1670, Morris encountered Portuguese pirate Manuel Ribeiro Pardal, who had long been raiding shipping under a letter of marque from Spain, and boarded his ship, San Pedro y La Fama, while sailing off the northern coast of Cuba. Many of his crew were killed by Morris's crew after jumping overboard in panic, and Pardal himself was shot through the neck.

Morris would later serve under Morgan in his later raids against Puerto del Príncipe, Portobelo and Maracaibo. He took part in the raid on Panama in January 1671, with himself and Lawrence Prince leading the assault. Upon their return to Port Royal following the Panama raid, newly appointed governor Sir Thomas Lynch arrested Morgan whose attack, although commissioned by former governor Thomas Modyford, had taken place following the recently signed peace treaty between England and Spain. Apparently not subject to arrest, Morris was given command of the frigate Lilly and commissioned as a pirate hunter with explicit instructions to arrest privateers who continued acts of piracy against Spain.

In January 1672, he left Port Royal with HMS Assistance under Major William Beeston and sailed towards Havana in search of privateers. During the voyage, as described in Beeston's logbook, Morris was a skilled pilot who greatly assisted Beeston and other British Captain's unfamiliar with Caribbean waters. During the six-week voyage, the expedition successfully captured Marteen's former sloop Charity, now under Captain Francis Witherborn, and the Mary under Captain Du Mangles bringing back a total of forty three prisoners.

By that September Lynch had again dispatched Morris to hunt rogue privateers who were harassing the Spanish. In particular he was to hunt down Jelles de Lecat (known as "Captain Yellows"); Morris just missed bringing in Lecat in 1670 when he encountered Pardal. Instead Morris joined the bay-men in hauling logwood, which proved safer and more profitable than privateering: "Capt. Wells, in the Civilian of Jamaica from Triste in the Bay of Campeachy, bound with logwood for New England, reports ... that Capt. Morrice in the Lilly, a late pirate pardoned by Sir Thos. Lynch and pretended to be sent against Yellows, a late privateer revolted to the Spaniards, yet never attempted to pursue him though at Villa de Mors 70 leagues from him, but has laden his frigate with logwood."

== In popular culture ==
- Age of Pirates 2: City of Abandoned Ships (2009 video game) features a character named John Morris who lives in the Port of Spain.
