= Thomas Freeman (pirate) =

Thomas Freeman (fl. 1655–1680) was an English buccaneer and pirate active in the Caribbean. He is best known for attacking the Spanish alongside Henry Morgan, David Marteen, and John Morris.

== History ==
Freeman arrived on Jamaica in 1655 as part of Oliver Cromwell's invasion force, remaining there for the next several years. Freeman obtained a privateering commission against the Spanish from Lord Windsor, the Governor of Jamaica, and may have used it to join Christopher Myngs’ sack of Santiago de Cuba and Campeche in 1662-1663.

In 1664 he joined with John Morris, Henry Morgan, David Marteen, and Jacob Fackman to raid the Mexican outposts of Tabasco and Villahermosa. Their ships were seized by the Spanish while the buccaneers were ashore. After they captured a few Spanish ships they looted their way through Honduras and Nicaragua, where they captured Granada with the help of native tribes.

The buccaneers returned to Port Royal (in their own ships, which they had recaptured) in summer 1665, without Marteen, who was Dutch and elected to avoid the English settlement and sailed for Tortuga instead. When Windsor’s replacement Governor Thomas Modyford became angry at the raiders – the English had in the meantime made peace with Spain – they insisted that “having been out 22 months and hearing nothing of the cessation betwixt the King and the Spaniard” they had been sailing under Windsor's old privateering commissions and had no idea Spanish cities were off-limits.

Freeman used the proceeds from the raids to purchase a tavern in Port Royal. He later became a Colonel with the Jamaican militia and joined the Jamaican Council alongside future Governor Hender Molesworth and the recently knighted Henry Morgan.

== See also ==
- Robert Searle – another famous English buccaneer closely associated with Myngs and Morgan, and who was frequently stymied by Modyford.
