= James Browne (pirate) =

Scottish pirate and privateer

- Died: 1677; Jamaica
- Cause of death: Execution by hanging
- Occupation: Pirate
- Known for: His hasty execution and its effect on colonial Jamaican government
- Piratical career
- Base of operations: Caribbean

James Browne (died 1677) was a Scottish pirate and privateer active in the Caribbean. He is best known for his hasty execution and its effect on colonial Jamaican government.

== History ==
Jamaican officials had been working to curb rampant privateering in the region since the tenure of Lieutenant Governor (and former buccaneer) Henry Morgan. To the dismay of English lords eager to find allies in Europe, privateers would regularly abuse their legal commissions to attack shipping of all nations.

Using a privateering commission from Governor D’Ogeron of French Tortuga, Browne sailed from Jamaica in October 1676 with a multi-national crew. Early in 1677 he captured the Dutch West Indies Company slaving ship Golden Sun off Cartagena, killing several of its officers and crew. That May he reappeared in Jamaica trying to sell slaves to local plantations. Governor Vaughn dispatched a frigate to collect most of the slaves from the planters who had purchased them illicitly. He then wrote to the Governor of Dutch Curacao to warn him of Browne's piracy.

The Jamaican Assembly had passed an act in April 1677 forbidding English subjects from serving foreign governments, and shortly after passed a similar act pardoning all privateers who surrendered within a year. Browne and his crew turned themselves in soon afterwards. Upon inspection, his privateering commission from Tortuga was found to be expired: Governor D’Ogeron had been dead for over a year. They were tried and convicted for piracy. The crew were pardoned but Browne was sentenced to be hanged in July. Browne twice petitioned the Jamaica Assembly for a reprieve so that he could be set free under the terms of the "Act of Privateers". The Assembly tried to intervene for him but Vaughn ordered Brown executed immediately. He argued that setting Browne free would set a bad precedent ("hindering the sentence of execution will be of evil example and bad consequence"); the Assembly countered that “if this execution take place all our privateers which are out may think this Act a snare and possibly make those already in go out again.” The Assembly's Chief Justice Samuel Long and Speaker (and future governor) William Beeston ordered Browne's execution delayed, but Browne had been hanged only minutes earlier: “Half-an-hour after, the Marshal came with an order signed by the Speaker to observe the Chief Justice's writ of habeas corpus.”

Vaughn was incensed with Long and Beeston and dissolved the Jamaican Assembly. He charged both with a series of insubordinations over the Browne privateering affair and sent them back to England to answer for their crimes. English officials not only supported Long and Beeston instead of Vaughn, but removed him from power and installed the Earl of Carlisle as governor in his place.

After going through three governors in two years, it took until mid-1679 for Jamaica to repay the Dutch West India Company for the loss of slaves to Browne's piracy, and then only when the Lords of Trade and Plantations forced Carlisle to do so. The following year (1680) Carlisle levied the same charges against Justice Long that Vaughn had, still holding him accountable for the "disorderly" manner in which he had handled Browne's trial.

== See also ==
- Thomas Lynch, Lord Archibald Hamilton, and Nicholas Lawes – three other Jamaican Governors known for their dealings with and struggles against pirates and privateers
