= Jan Erasmus Reyning =

- Born: 1640; Flushing, Netherlands
- Died: 1697 (aged 56–57); Gulf of Biscay
- Piratical career
- Type: Buccaneer, privateer
- Allegiance: England, France, Spain, Netherlands
- Years active: 1669-1672
- Rank: Captain
- Base of operations: Caribbean
- Later work: Dutch Navy Officer

Jan Erasmus Reyning (1640–1697) was a Dutch pirate, privateer and naval officer.

Jan Erasmus Reyning was born in Flushing in 1640 as the son of a Danish mariner and a Zeeland woman. As a boy, he went to sea with his father and later started a seaman's career of his own. He was taken prisoner during the Second Anglo-Dutch War (1665–1667), and later served as an engagé (servant) on a French plantation on the island of Hispaniola. Around 1667 he became a buccaneer, i.e. a hunter in central Hispaniola, and around 1669 he started a career as a pirate or filibuster.

Although documentary evidence is limited, Reyning is believed to have fought as a privateer captain with French or English letters of marque between 1669 and 1672. His partner was one Jelle Lecat (probably born in Frisia as Jelle de Kat). Reyning must have co-operated with renowned pirates as Roche Braziliano and Henry Morgan. According to reliable Spanish documents, Reyning offered his services to his former Spanish enemies at Campeche around January 1672. The Spanish accepted his services and he even took catechisation lessons from a Catholic priest. In 1673 Reyning, Lecat, and Irish pirate Philip Fitzgerald took more than 40 vessels in the area, mostly logwood cutters. Later that year, when Reyning learned that his home country, The Netherlands, was at war with England and France (in the Franco-Dutch War and the Third Anglo-Dutch War), he sailed to the Dutch colony of Curaçao. He became a sort of Robin Hood for Curaçao that was threatened by many enemies.

In his later years Reyning was a Dutch gentleman and marine officer who died at full sea in the Gulf of Biskay in a storm on 2 February 1697.
