= Jelles de Lecat =

Dutch pirate and buccaneer

- Occupations: Pirate and buccaneer
- Years active: 1668-1674
- Known for: Served with Henry Morgan
- Piratical career
- Nickname: "Yellahs," "Yallahs," or “Captain Yellows.”
- Type: Pirate, Guarda costa
- Allegiance: For and against both the English and Spanish

Jelles de Lecat (fl. 1668-1674, last name also Lescat) was a Dutch pirate and buccaneer who sailed for and against both the English and Spanish. He served with Henry Morgan and was often called "Yellahs," "Yallahs," or “Captain Yellows.”

== Biography ==
=== Piracy ===
Notorious French pirate L'Olonnais put into Jamaica in 1668 to sell one of his prize ships, an 80-ton 12-gun Spanish brigantine. It was purchased by Roc Brasiliano, who became Captain, with Lecat as his first mate. Together they cruised near Puerto Bello and Cartagena, where they soon captured another Spanish ship. Brasiliano took the new capture, while Lecat became Captain of the brigantine.

In spring 1669, they partnered with English Captain Joseph Bradley to raid the Spanish. Impatient for plunder, Lecat loaded his ship with logwood, while Brasiliano and Bradley blockaded the port of Campeche. A Spanish fleet soon chased the trio away. Brasiliano's ship was wrecked in the escape; Lecat rescued him, putting him aboard Bradley's ship. Lecat then sailed with Jan Reyning, capturing a merchantman, which they kept and renamed Seviliaen after sinking the brigantine. He also sailed briefly alongside English buccaneer Francis Witherborn.

Henry Morgan assembled a fleet to sack Panama in 1670, including Brasiliano, Reyning, Bradley, and Lecat. Bradley was killed assaulting a Spanish fort, and the rest marched overland across Panama into 1671. Lecat and Reyning left the group after disagreeing with Morgan over the division of spoils. They sailed for Jamaica, where they refused a pardon and rendezvoused in the Cayman Islands instead. After raiding Cuba they captured a Spanish guarda costa vessel, which Lecat kept for himself, giving the Seviliaen to Reyning.

Sailing back to Campeche, they marooned the English members of their crew and took a commission from the Spanish, who may have paid them a huge sum to switch sides, possibly purchasing one of their old ships as well.

=== Turn to guarda-costas ===
They brought the English logwood trade to a standstill off the coast of Honduras, capturing over a dozen ships for the Spanish. Lecat stayed at sea, bringing in prize ships and valuable cargo while Reyning stayed in port, acting as their agent to help dispose of plunder and captured ships.

Reyning sailed on his own in the Serviliaen in late 1672 on an escort mission. He waited to rendezvous with Lecat, who never arrived. The following year Serviliaen was lost in a storm near Hispaniola, though Reyning escaped.

Lecat was apparently still active enough to warrant the attention of officials in England. He had been legendary in his skill and in luck evading capture. English officials tried several times to hire privateers and former raiders to capture Lecat with no success. Reyning himself may have been originally sent to hunt down Lecat, though they joined forces instead. In 1670, Jamaican Governor Modyford sent a buccaneer named Morris (Morrice) to arrest Lecat, who was vulnerable while careening his ship. Morris ignored Lecat and captured a Spaniard instead. Modyford's successor Thomas Lynch sent Captain Wilgres after Lecat, but Wilgres went buccaneering on his own. The warship HMS Assistance under William Beeston hunted Lecat in 1671, only to have him shelter under the guns of a Spanish fort during a brief period of neutrality; Beeston instead captured Witherborn and a French pirate named Du Mangles. The following year, Lynch dispatched Morris again, this time along with Captain Allword. Morris turned to logwood hauling while Allword became a smuggler.

In 1672 the English Trade and Plantations committee warned logwood ships to sail in convoy and prepare to defend themselves. Finally in 1674 the King issued a pardon specifically for Lecat and an Irish pirate named Philip Fitzgerald, forbidding them from serving other nations, offering them forgiveness if they surrendered, and authorizing the Jamaican Governor to hunt them down if not: “and in regard Captains Yellows and Fitzgerald, two of his Majesty's subjects, appeared to be the chief instruments of said depredations, That a Proclamation be issued for recalling his Majesty's subjects from the service of any foreign Prince between the tropics in America, with promise of pardon if they render themselves within a convenient time; and that the Governor of Jamaica receive speedy order for securing both said persons if found so offending after the time limited within his Government, and cause them to be sent prisoners to England.” Little is known of Lecat's further activities.

== See also ==
- Jean Hamlin, another French buccaneer who used some of Morgan's old hideouts, and who was hunted by Governor Lynch.
