= Joseph Bradley (buccaneer) =

English buccaneer

Joseph Bradley was an English buccaneer active in the Caribbean in around 1670. He died during the capture of Fort San Lorenzo.

== Gulf Campaign (1669–1670) ==
Bradley aided Roche Braziliano and Jelles de Lescat in a campaign against the Spanish around the Laguna de Términos in the spring of 1669. Bradley was the only to capture a ship, a Cuban vessel with a cargo of flour. Bradley and Braziliano returned to blockade the town of Campeche that summer.

== Panama Campaign (1670–1671) ==
In August 1670, Bradley sailed with Braziliano and de Lescat to join Henry Morgan's campaign in Panama. Morgan sent Bradley's Mayflower and two other ships (with a force of 400 men) to capture Fort San Lorenzo which guarded the mouth of the Chagres river and the city of Chagres.

Although Bradley and 100 of his men died during the attack, it left Chagres unprotected and vulnerable to Morgan's fleet allowing them to capture the city.
