= Roche Braziliano =

Dutch pirate

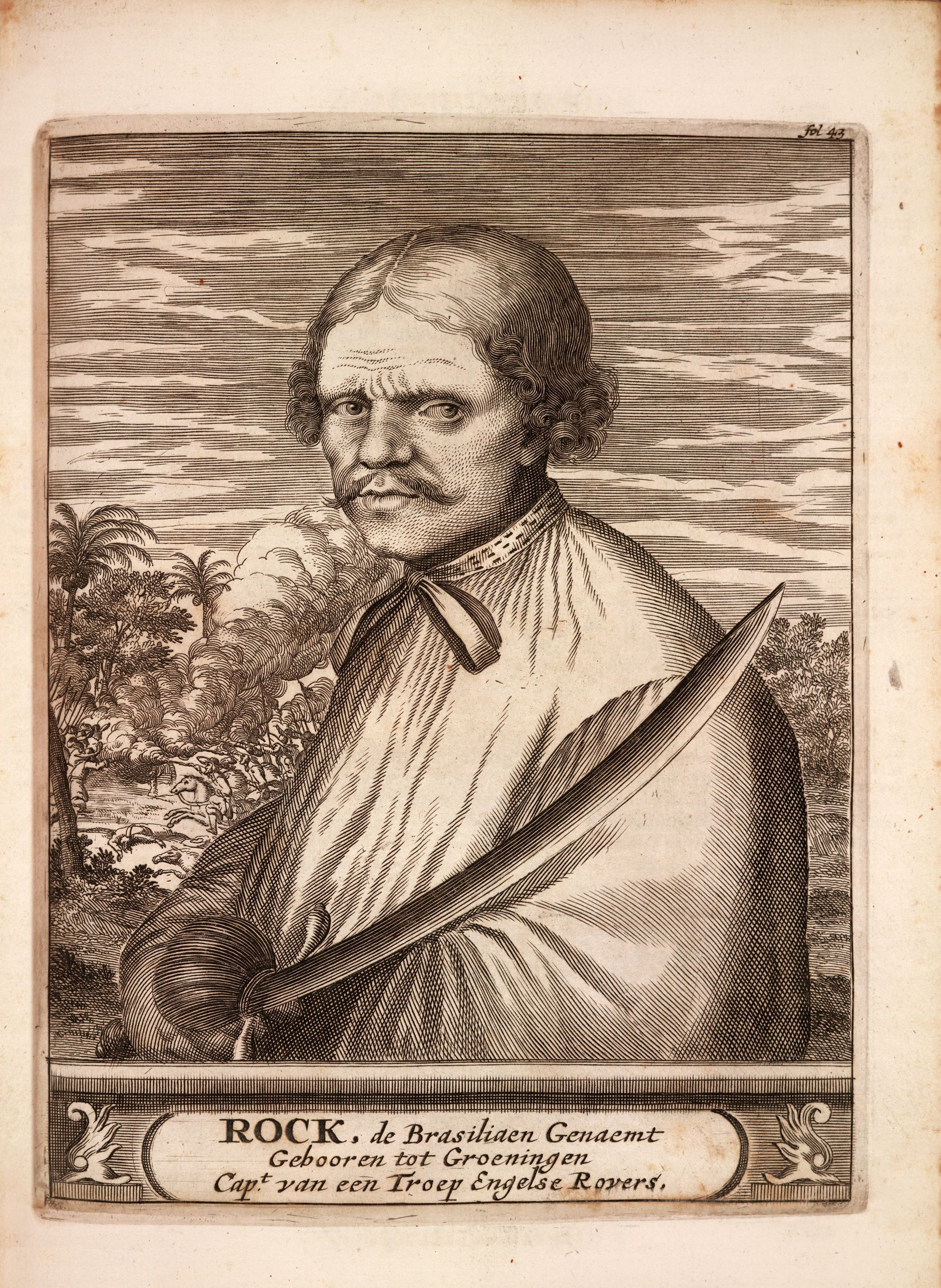
- An illustration of Roche Braziliano in Alexandre Exquemelin's The Buccaneers of America (1678)
- Born: 27 February 1630; Groningen, Netherlands
- Died: 1681 (aged 50–51); Curaçao
- Piratical career
- Type: Dutch buccaneer
- Years active: 1654–1671
- Base of operations: Port Royal, Jamaica

Roche Braziliano (Note: Name also spelled Rock, Roch, Roc, Roque, Brazilliano, Brasiliaan, or Brasiliano.) (c. 1630 – 1681) was a Dutch pirate from the city of Groningen. His piratical career lasted from 1654 until his death in 1681. He was first made famous in Alexandre Exquemelin's 1678 book The Buccaneers of America; Exquemelin did not know Braziliano's real name, but historians have argued his probable real name was Gerrit Gerritszoon and that he and his parents had moved to Dutch Brazil. He is known as "Roche Braziliano", which in English translates to "Rock the Brazilian", due to his long exile in Brazil.

== Pirate career ==
Roche Braziliano was a notoriously cruel buccaneer who operated out of Port Royal, Jamaica. He was a privateer in Bahia, Brazil, before moving to Port Royal in 1654. He led a mutiny and adopted the life of a buccaneer. On his first adventure he captured a ship of immense value and brought it back safely to Jamaica. He eventually was caught and sent to Spain, but he escaped with threats of vengeance from his followers. He soon resumed his criminal career, purchasing a new ship from fellow pirate François l'Olonnais and later sailing in company with Henry Morgan and Joseph Bradley among others. Braziliano's first mate Yellows eventually became a captain in his own right, sailing with Braziliano, Morgan, and others in raids against the Spanish.

== Atrocities ==
Drunken and debauched, Braziliano would threaten to shoot anyone who did not drink with him. He roasted alive two Spanish farmers on wooden spits after they refused to hand over their pigs. He treated his Spanish prisoners barbarously, typically cutting off their limbs or roasting them alive over a fire. The Spaniards feared him so much, that Spanish mothers used his name as a hush word for their children.

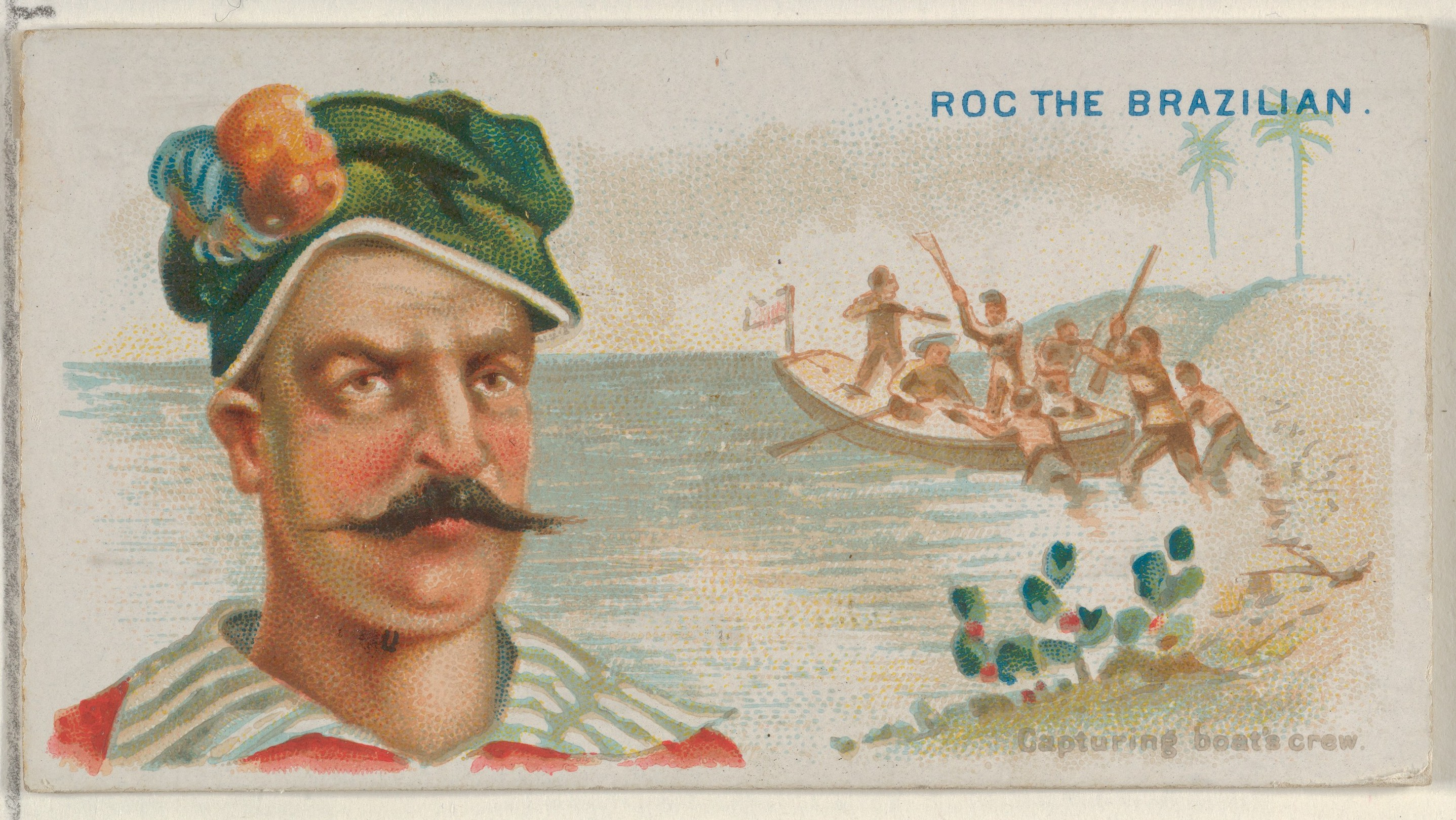
Roc the Brazilian, Capturing Boat's Crew, from the Pirates of the Spanish Main series (N19) for Allen & Ginter Cigarettes MET DP835018

== Fate ==
Adolph Esmit, Governor of St. Thomas, wrote in 1683 that Braziliano had arrived in Curaçao in 1681 carrying French paperwork. Spaniards in residence demanded that he be extradited to face Spanish justice, but the Governor of Curaçao rebuffed them and summarily hanged Braziliano himself.

== Popular culture ==
- A pirate named Roc Brasiliano was portrayed by Anthony Quinn in the 1952 swashbuckler film Against All Flags.
- Roche Braziliano is one of the pirates featured in the game Sid Meier's Pirates!
- "Rock Brazilliano" is one of the pirate captains/kings in the game Tropico 2: Pirate Cove
- The ghost of Captain Roche is found as a boss battle in Abbey Games' Renowned Explorers: International Society.
- May be the namesake of the One Piece character Rocks D. Xebec.
- "Rock Braziliano" is featured in the Boardgame "Tortuga 1667" as a playable character

General

- Pickering, David. "Pirates". CollinsGem. HarperCollins Publishers, New York, NY. pp-52, 201. 2006.

== Notes ==
Specific
