= William Beeston (colonial administrator) =

Sir William Beeston (born 1636, fl. 1702) was an English political and legal figure, lieutenant-governor of Jamaica.

== Early life ==
Beeston was born at Tichfield, Hampshire, being second son of William Beeston MP of Posbrook, by Elizabeth, daughter of Arthur Bromfield MP. His elder brother, Henry Beeston, was headmaster of Winchester College and Warden of New College, Oxford.

== Biography ==
=== Travel to Jamaica ===
Beeston went to Jamaica in 1660. In 1664 he was elected, as a member of Port Royal, to the first house of assembly; he was sent to prison by the speaker for contempt of his authority, was brought before the governor and council, reprimanded and released. Beeston tells us that when this assembly, which had been 'marked by parties, great heate, and ill-humours,' adjourned, 'to make amends for their jangling, and to cement the rents that had been made, it was determined to treat the governor and council to a dinner, and a splendid dinner was provided, with wine and music, and what else might make it great. This held well till the plenty of wine made the old wounds appear, for then all went together by the ears, and in the unlucky conflict honest Captain Rutter, a worthy gentleman of the assembly, was killed by Major Joy, who was of the council, and had always been his friend, but the drink and other men's quarrels made them fall out.' In December of this year Beeston was made a judge of the court of common pleas, Jamaica.

=== Travels to Cuba and elsewhere ===
In 1665 the governor, Sir Thomas Modyford, sent him to negotiate with a force of privateers who were threatening St. Spiritus, Cuba. In 1671 Sir Thomas Lynch (who had succeeded Sir Thomas Modyford as governor) sent 'Major' Beeston with a fleet to carry articles of peace with the Spaniards to Cartagena, and to bring away the English prisoners;' and on his return to Jamaica gave him the command of the frigate HMS Assistance (Addit. MS. 12430, fol. 33). Using Assistance he brought in French pirate Du Mangle and English turncoat buccaneer Francis Witherborn. The following year he sailed to Cuba and Hispaniola 'to look after pirates and privateers' (including Captain Yellows) and to Havana 'to fetch away the prisoners.' On 10 July 1672 he convoyed a fleet of merchantmen to England. In 1675 Beeston and Sir Henry Morgan (of buccaneering celebrity) were appointed commissioners of the admiralty. In 1677 and the two following years 'Lieutenant-Colonel Beeston,' as speaker of the house of assembly, zealously promoted the opposition to the efforts of the governor, the Earl of Carbery, to assimilate the government of Jamaica to that then existing in Ireland, and to obtain an act settling a perpetual revenue upon the crown. After an argument over the execution of pirate James Browne, the new governor, Charles Howard, 1st Earl of Carlisle, dissolved the Assembly, and ordered Colonel Samuel Long (late chief justice) and Colonel Beeston to England to answer for their contumacy. On their arrival they brought counter charges against his lordship. He was superseded in the government, and 'his majesty, after hearing Colonel Long and Colonel Beeston, not only returned to their island its former government and all privileges they had hitherto enjoyed, but enlarged them'.

=== Return to Jamaica ===
Beeston does not appear to have returned to Jamaica until 1693, having at the close of the previous year been knighted at Kensington and appointed lieutenant-governor of the island. He found it still suffering from the effects of the fearful earthquake of 7 June 1692, followed by an epidemic fever, and in October Beeston writes to Lord ––: 'By the mortality which yet continues I have lost all my family but my wife and one child, and have not one servant left to attend me but my cook, so it is very uneasy being here.' He goes on to beg that if his appointment is not to be permanent he may be as soon as possible recalled (Add. MS. 28878, fol. 135).

=== Resisting French invasion ===
In 1694 Beeston, as commander-in-chief, successfully resisted a very formidable invasion of Jamaica by the French. 'A Narrative by Sir William Beeston on the Descent on Jamaica by the French,' and 'A Letter from the Council in England in answer to his narrative,' conveying her majesty's thanks, are to be found in manuscript in the library of the British Museum. Beeston continued an uneasy relationship with the French afterwards, corresponding with Jean-Baptiste du Casse while dealing with Jacobites and other disaffected Englishmen (such as pirate Nathaniel Grubing) who sailed in French service.

In 1699 Beeston, at the instigation of the home government, helped to complete the ruin of the Scotch colony at Darien by a proclamation forbidding the inhabitants of Jamaica to trade with them or afford them any assistance. His position as head of the executive was a more than usually difficult one. During his previous residence he had been a leader of the colonists in their struggle for self-government, now he was the recognised upholder of royal prerogative. Yet for some time he contrived to secure for himself a greater share of popularity than had been the lot of any of his immediate predecessors, and he dissolved the assembly of 1700 in tolerable harmony with all its members.

=== Accounting for unowned money and treasure ===
The succeeding house called upon him 'to account for the large sums of unowned money and treasure' found amidst the ruins of the earthquake, and for an account of the disbursement of £4,000 royal bounty to the sufferers by the French invasion. Beeston would not comply with their demand, and the house, refusing to proceed with any other business, was dissolved. On 21 January 1702 Beeston was superseded in the government, and in the first assembly of his successor, General William Selwyn, an address was voted praying that Sir W. Beeston might not be permitted to quit the island without accounting for the moneys he had appropriated. Selwyn died before it could be presented, but it was received by the new governor, Colonel Beckford, grandfather of the lord mayor of London, who said that he did not consider Beeston responsible to the house of assembly, but to the king. Nevertheless, as an act of grace he submitted to them an explanation which Beeston had made to himself of the application of the money (Proceeds. H. of Assembly MS. 12425), which must have satisfied them, as they appear to have taken no further notice of the matter, and Beeston sailed for England on 25 April.

In the 'Transactions of the Royal Society' for 1696 there is 'an abstract from a letter of Sir W. Beeston to Mr. C. Bernard, containing some observations about the barometer, and of a hot bath in Jamaica', and in the library of the British Museum there is a daily journal in the handwriting of Sir William Beeston of seven voyages made by him from 10 December 1671 to 28 June 1702.

== Family ==
Sir William Beeston's daughter, Jane, married, first, Sir Thomas Modyford, bart., and, secondly, Charles Long, to whom she was second wife.

Preceded by John Burden	Governor of Jamaica; March 1693 – January 1702, acting to 1699	Succeeded by William Selwyn
