= Arthur Bromfield =

English politician

Arthur Bromfield (died 1650) was an English politician who sat in the House of Commons between 1604 and 1622.

Bromfield was the son of William Bromfield, who was a gentleman pensioner to Queen Elizabeth.

In 1604, Bromfield was elected Member of Parliament for Yarmouth (Isle of Wight). He was re-elected MP for Yarmouth in 1614 and 1621.

Bromfield married Lucy Quincey who died in 1618. They had several sons: Henry, Quincey, and Arthur, and several daughters.

Parliament of England
Preceded by William Cotton; Stephen Theobald	Member of Parliament for Yarmouth (Isle of Wight); 1604–1622; With: (Sir) Thomas Cheeke 1604–1614; Thomas Risley 1621–1622	Succeeded by Thomas Risley; William Beeston
