= Henry Morgan =

Welsh privateer, politician in Jamaica (1635–1688)

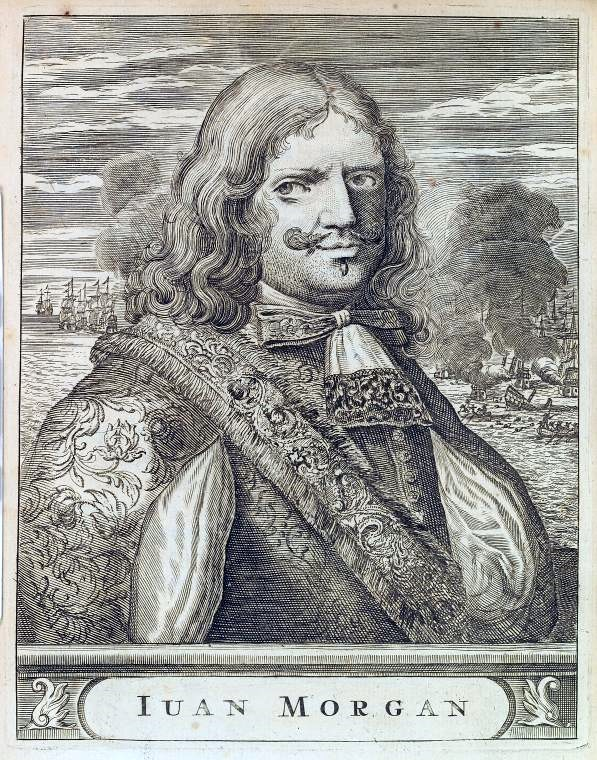
- Morgan from Piratas de la America (1681) by Alexandre Exquemelin
- Born: c. 1635; Llanrumney, Cardiff or nearby what was Pencarn, Monmouthshire, Wales
- Died: 25 August 1688 (aged 52–53); Lawrencefield, Colony of Jamaica
- Piratical career
- Allegiance: Kingdom of England
- Years active: 1663–1671
- Later work: Lieutenant Governor of Jamaica

Sir Henry Morgan (Welsh: Harri Morgan; c. 1635 – 25 August 1688) was a Welsh privateer, plantation owner and, later, the lieutenant governor of Jamaica. From his base in Port Royal, Jamaica, he and those under his command raided settlements and shipping on the Spanish Main, from which he profited. With the prize money and plunder from these raids, Morgan purchased three large sugar plantations in Jamaica.

Much of Morgan's early life is unknown; he was born in an area of Monmouthshire that is now part of the city of Cardiff. (Note: The administration of Monmouthshire at the time of Morgan's birth was complex; the Encyclopaedia Britannica state that for 400 years, "Monmouthshire was considered administratively a part of Wales". Since the early 20th century it has been administered as a Welsh county. A possible birthplace is Llanrumney, which is now in the city of Cardiff but was historically in Monmouthshire.) It is not known how he reached the West Indies or how he began his career as a privateer. He was probably a member of a group of raiders led by Sir Christopher Myngs in the late 1650s during the Anglo-Spanish War. Morgan became a close friend of Sir Thomas Modyford, the Governor of Jamaica; as diplomatic relations between the Kingdom of England and Spain worsened in 1667, Modyford gave Morgan a letter of marque, or licence, to attack and seize Spanish vessels. Morgan subsequently led raids on Puerto del Príncipe (now Camagüey in modern Cuba) and Porto Bello (now Portobelo in modern Panamá). In 1668, he sailed to Maracaibo, Venezuela, and Gibraltar, on Lake Maracaibo; he plundered both cities before destroying a Spanish squadron during his escape.

In 1671, Morgan and his men attacked Panama City, landing on the Caribbean coast and crossing the isthmus and its jungles before attacking the city, located on the Pacific coast. This took place after the signing of a peace treaty. To appease the Spanish, Morgan was arrested and summoned to London in 1672; despite this, he was received favourably in England and soon regained the favour of the government and King Charles II.

Morgan was appointed a Knight Bachelor in November 1674 and returned to the Colony of Jamaica shortly afterwards to serve as the territory's lieutenant governor. He served on the Assembly of Jamaica until 1683; on three occasions, he acted as governor in the absence of the post-holder. His reputation was later affected by a memoir by Alexandre Exquemelin, a former Flemish shipmate of Morgan, which accused him of torture and other offences, including during the raid on Panama City. Morgan won a libel suit against the book's English publishers, but Exquemelin's account influenced later portrayals of him. After his death in 1688, Morgan became the inspiration for pirate-themed works of fiction across a range of genres.

== Early life ==
Born Harri Morgan around 1635 in Wales, either in Llanrumney or Pencarn (both in Monmouthshire, between Cardiff and Newport). (Note: Information on the year of Morgan's birth is unreliable; in a deposition sworn in November 1671 he gave his age as 36.) The historian David Williams, writing in the Dictionary of Welsh Biography, observes that attempts to identify his parents and antecedents "have all proved unsatisfactory", although his will referred to distant relations. Several sources state Morgan's father was Robert Morgan, a farmer. (Note: The sources that show Robert as Henry's father include: Zahedieh, Nuala (2004). "Morgan, Sir Henry (c.1635–1688)". Oxford Dictionary of National Biography.; Blalock, Glenn (2000). "Morgan, Sir Henry". American National Biography.; Pope, Dudley (1978). The Buccaneer King: The Biography of the Notorious Sir Henry Morgan 1635–1688.; Breverton, Terry (2005). Admiral Sir Henry Morgan: The Greatest Buccaneer of them all.) Nuala Zahedieh, writing for the Oxford Dictionary of National Biography, states that details of Morgan's early life and career are uncertain, although in later life he stated that he had left school early and was "much more used to the pike than the book".

It is unknown how Morgan made his way to the Caribbean. He may have travelled to the Caribbean as part of the army of Robert Venables, sent by Oliver Cromwell as part of the Caribbean expedition against the Spanish in the West Indies in 1654, or he may have served as an apprentice to a maker of cutlery for three years in exchange for the cost of his emigration. Richard Browne, who served as surgeon under Morgan in 1670 stated that Morgan had travelled either as a "private gentleman" soon after the 1655 capture of Jamaica by the English, or he may have been abducted in Bristol and transported to Barbados, where he was sold as a servant. In the 17th century the Caribbean offered an opportunity for young men to become rich quickly, although significant investment was needed to obtain high returns from the sugar export economy. Other opportunities for financial gain were through trade or plunder of the Spanish Empire. Much of the plunder was from privateering, whereby individuals and ships were commissioned by government to attack the country's enemies. (Note: According to the anthropologists Shannon Lee Dawdy and Joe Bonni, pirates are defined as "bandits, or sailors who seize property and/or people by force"; privateers are defined as those "who operate with a legal license from a state government to attack enemy ships and ports during wartime, keeping a contracted share of seized goods". Dawdy and Bonni define buccaneers as "originally castaway colonists (usually French or English) on Hispanio (from French) who survived by hunting or raising livestock", although the historian Jon Latimer observes that the terms pirate and buccaneer have been interchangeable in English since the 17th century.)

== Career as a privateer ==
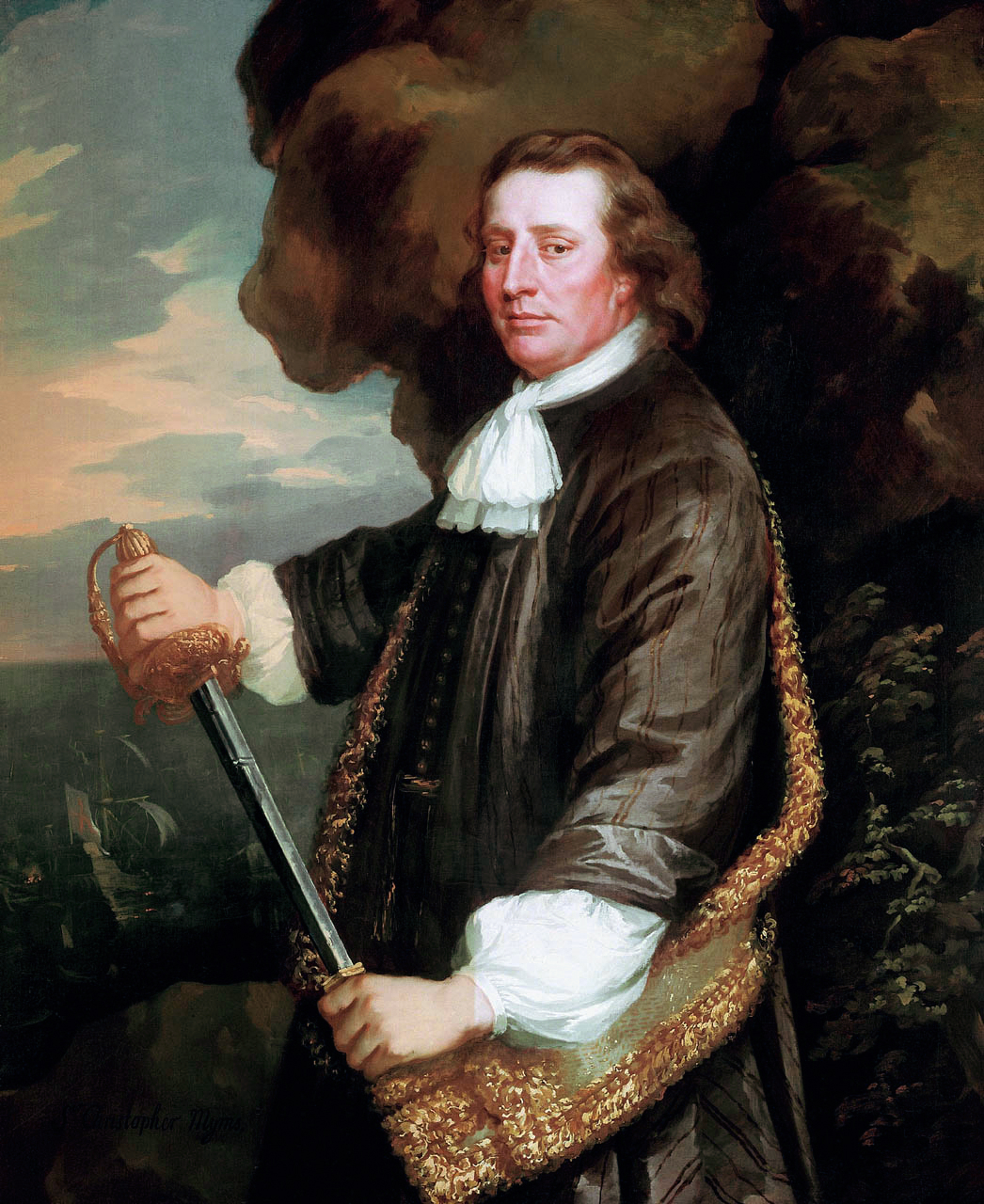
Sir Christopher Myngs, under whom Morgan served

It is probable that in the early 1660s Morgan was active with a group of privateers led by Sir Christopher Myngs attacking Spanish cities and settlements in the Caribbean and Central America when England was at war with Spain. It is likely that in 1663 Morgan captained one of the ships in Myngs' fleet, and took part in the attack on Santiago de Cuba and the Sack of Campeche on the Yucatán Peninsula. (Note: Although England and Spain were not at war (the six-year Anglo-Spanish War had ended in 1660) Charles II was concerned about the Spanish attitude to the fledgling English territories in the Caribbean. He instructed the governor of Jamaica, Lord Windsor, to put military pressure on the Spaniards in order to retain the English presence in the region.)

Sir Thomas Modyford had been appointed the Governor of Jamaica in February 1664 with instructions to limit the activities of the privateers; he made a proclamation against their activities on 11 June 1664, but economic practicalities led to his reversing the policy by the end of the month. About 1,500 privateers used Jamaica as a base for their activity and brought much revenue to the island. As the planting community of 5,000 was still new and developing, the revenue from the privateers was needed to avoid economic collapse. A privateer was granted a letter of marque which gave him a licence to attack and seize vessels, normally of a specified country, or with conditions attached. A portion of all spoils obtained by the privateers was given to the sovereign or the issuing ambassador.

In August 1665 Morgan, along with fellow captains John Morris and Jacob Fackman, returned to Port Royal with a large cargo of valuables. Modyford was impressed enough with the spoils to report back to the government that "Central America was the properest [sic] place for an attack on the Spanish Indies". Morgan's activities over the following two years are not documented, but in early 1666 he was married in Port Royal to his cousin, Mary Morgan, the daughter of Edward, the island's Deputy Governor; the marriage gave Henry access to the upper levels of Jamaican society. The couple had no children.

Hostilities between the English and Dutch in 1664 led to a change in government policy: colonial governors were now authorised to issue letters of marque against the Dutch. (Note: The hostilities led to the Second Anglo-Dutch War (1665–1667).) Many of the privateers, including Morgan, did not take up the letters, although an expedition to conquer the Dutch island of Sint Eustatius led to the death of Morgan's father-in-law, who was leading a 600-man force.

Sources differ about Morgan's activities in 1666. H. R. Allen, in his biography of Morgan, considers the privateer was the second-in-command to Captain Edward Mansvelt. Mansvelt had been issued a letter of marque for the invasion of Curaçao, although he did not attack Willemstad, the main city, either after he decided that it was too well defended or that there was insufficient plunder. (Note: Mansvelt instead selected the more lucrative city of Cartago, the capital of Costa Rica, as the target for his attack.) Alternatively, Jan Rogoziński and Stephan Talty, in their histories of Morgan and piracy, record that during the year, Morgan oversaw the Port Royal militia and the defence of Jamaica; Fort Charles at Port Royal was partly constructed under his leadership. (Note: Rogoziński points out that the erroneous report of Morgan's presence on Mansvelt's expedition was from Alexandre Exquemelin's history The Buccaneers of America, although there is no record of Morgan's being part of Mansvelt's group.) It was around this time that Morgan purchased his first plantation on Jamaica.

=== Puerto del Príncipe (1667) ===
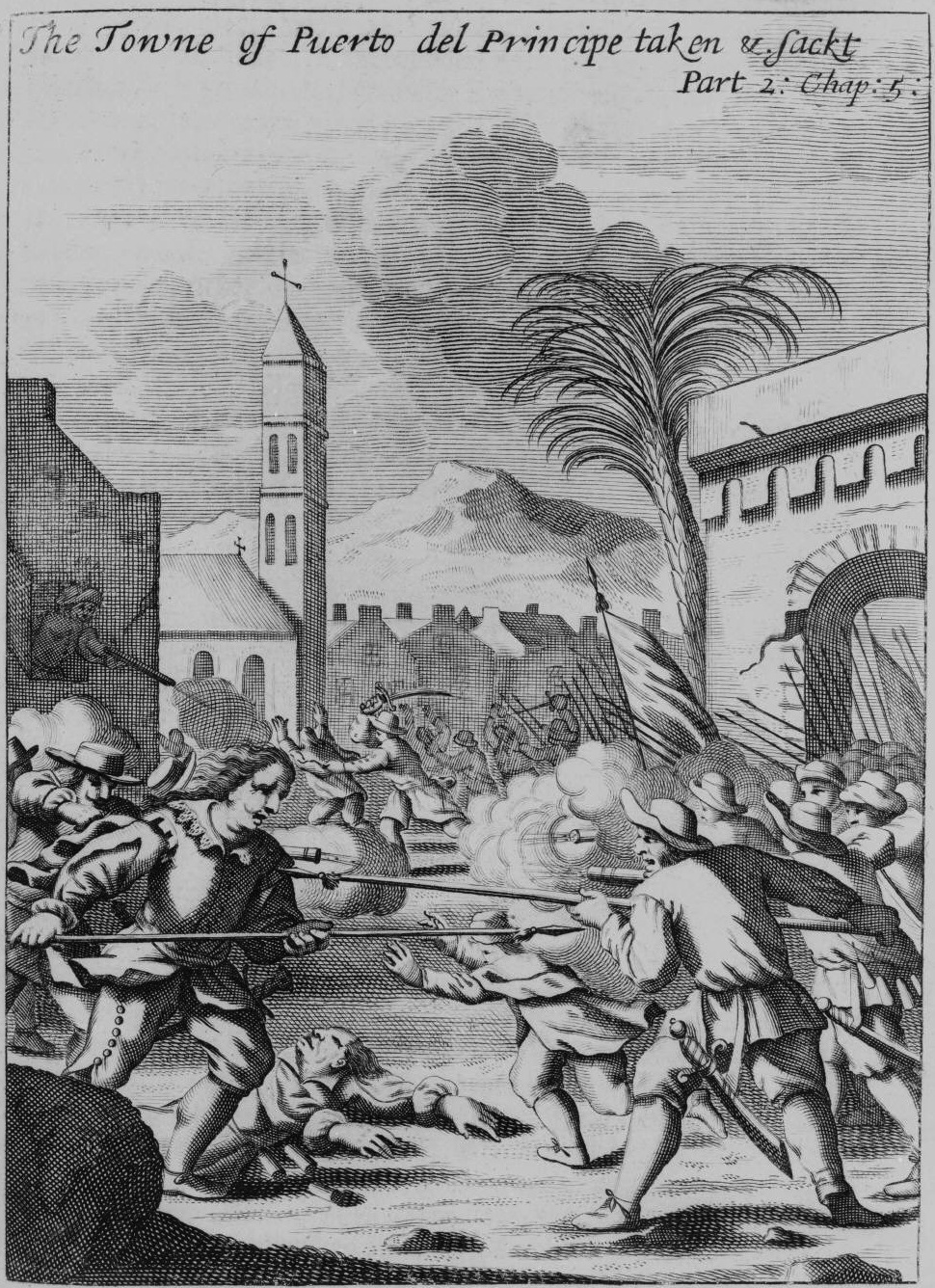
Puerto del Príncipe being sacked in 1668

In 1667 diplomatic relations between the kingdoms of England and Spain were worsening, and rumours began to circulate in Jamaica about a possible Spanish invasion. Modyford authorised privateers to take action against the Spanish, and issued a letter of marque to Morgan "to draw together the English privateers and take prisoners of the Spanish nation, whereby he might inform of the intention of that enemy to attack Jamaica, of which I have frequent and strong advice". He was given the rank of admiral and, in January 1668, assembled 10 ships and 500 men for the task; he was subsequently joined by 2 more ships and 200 men from Tortuga (now part of Haiti).

Morgan's letter of marque gave him permission to attack Spanish ships at sea; there was no permission for attacks on land. Any plunder obtained from the attacks would be split between the government and the owners of the ships rented by the privateers. If the privateers stepped outside their official remit and raided a city, any resultant plunder would be retained by the privateers. Rogoziński observes that "attacks on cities were illegal piracy – but extremely profitable", although Zahedieh records that if Morgan was able to provide evidence of a potential Spanish attack, the attacks on cities were justifiable under the terms of his commission. Morgan's initial plan was to attack Havana, but, on discovering it was heavily defended, changed the target to Puerto del Príncipe (now Camagüey), a town 50 miles (80 km) inland. Morgan and his men took the town, but the treasure obtained was less than hoped for. According to Alexandre Exquemelin, who sailed with Morgan, "It caused a general resentment and grief, to see such a small booty". When Morgan reported the taking of Puerto Principe to Modyford, he informed the governor that they had evidence that the Spanish were planning an attack on British territory: "we found seventy men had been pressed to go against Jamaica ... and considerable forces were expected from Vera Cruz and Campeachy ... and from Porto Bello and Cartagena to rendezvous at St Jago of Cuba [Santiago]".

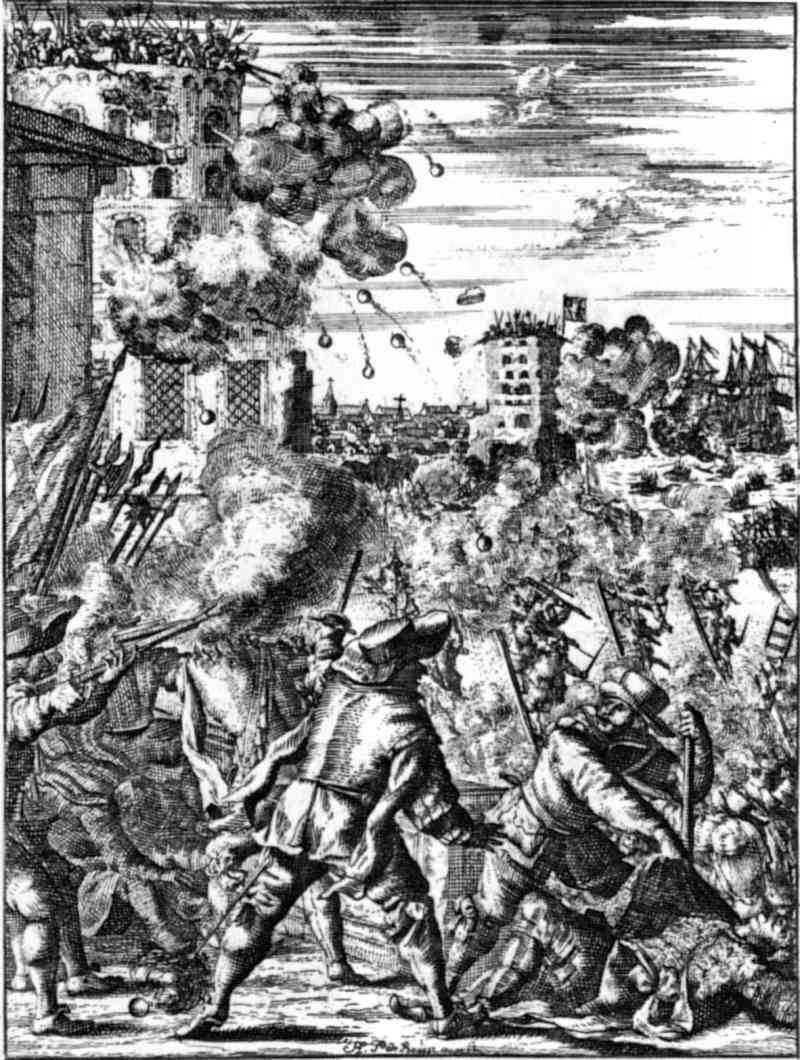
Morgan's attack on the Castillo de San Jerónimo, Porto Bello

After the action, one of the English privateers quarrelled with one of his French shipmates and stabbed him in the back, killing him. Before a riot between the French and English sailors could begin, Morgan arrested the English sailor, and promised the French sailors that the man would be hanged on his return to Port Royal. Morgan kept his word and the sailor was hanged.

=== Porto Bello (1668) ===
After dividing the spoils of the conquest of Puerto del Príncipe, Morgan announced a plan to attack Porto Bello (now in modern-day Panama). The city was the third largest and strongest on the Spanish Main, and on one of the main routes of trade between the Spanish territories and Spain. Because of the value of the goods passing through its port, Porto Bello was protected by two castles in the harbour and another in the town. The 200 French privateers, unhappy with the division of the treasure and the murder of their countryman, left Morgan's service and returned to Tortuga. Morgan and his ships briefly landed at Port Royal before leaving for Porto Bello.

On 11 July 1668 Morgan anchored short of Porto Bello and transferred his men to 23 canoes, which they paddled to within three miles (4.8 km) of the target. They landed and approached the first castle from the landward side, where they arrived half an hour before dawn. They took the three castles and the town quickly. The privateers lost 18 men, with a further 32 wounded; Zahedieh considers the action at Porto Bello displayed a "clever cunning and expert timing which marked ... [Morgan's] brilliance as a military commander".

Exquemelin wrote that in order to take the third castle, Morgan ordered the construction of ladders wide enough for three men to climb abreast; when they were completed he "commanded all the religious men and women whom he had taken prisoners to fix them against the walls of the castle ... these were forced, at the head of the companies to raise and apply them to the walls ... Thus many of the religious men and nuns were killed". Terry Breverton, in his biography of Morgan, writes that when a translation of Exquemelin's book was published in England, Morgan sued for libel and won. The passage about the use of nuns and monks as a human shield was retracted from subsequent publications in England.

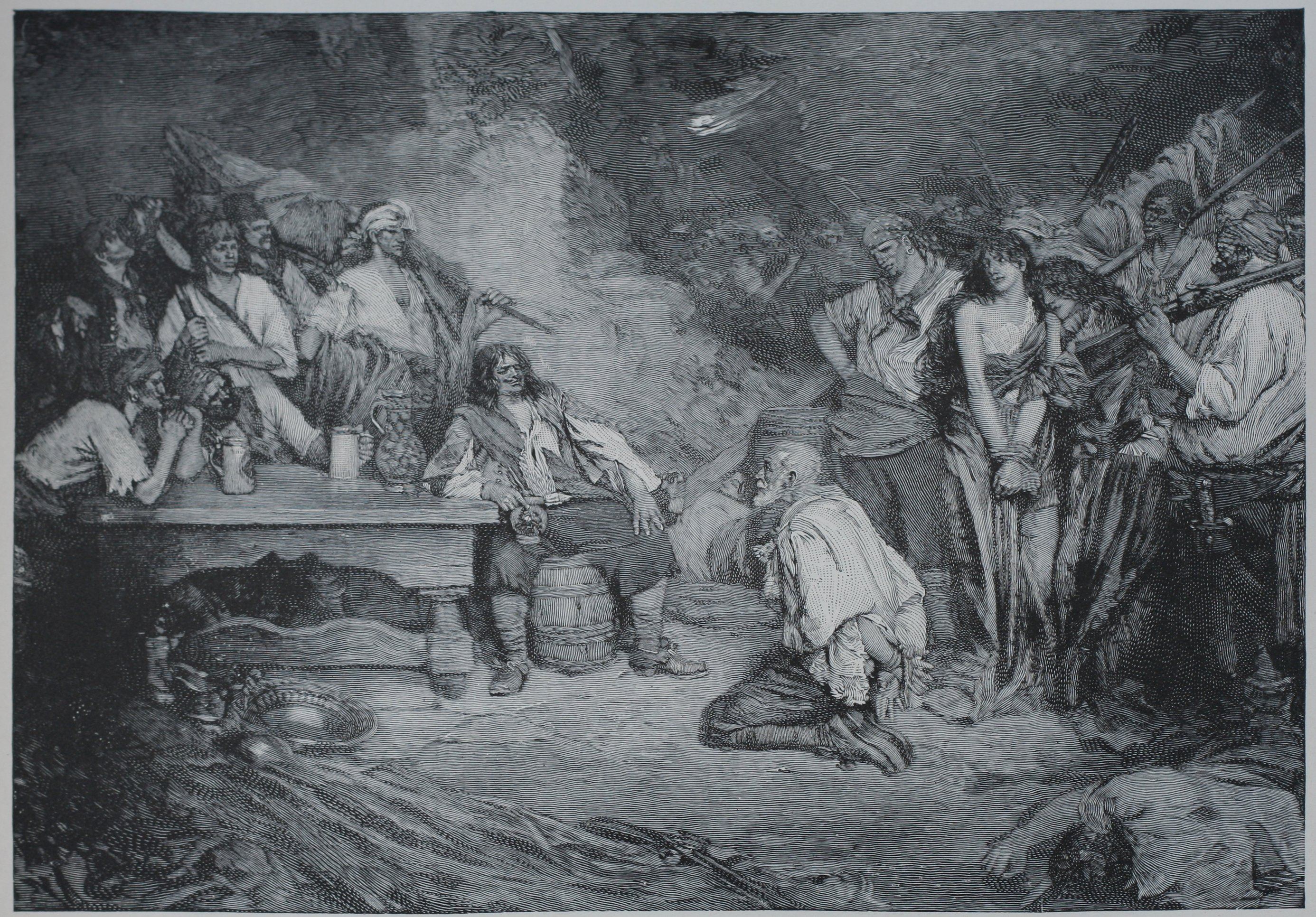
Morgan with a prisoner

Morgan and his men remained in Porto Bello for a month. He wrote to Don Agustín, the acting president of Panama, to demand a ransom for the city of 350,000 pesos. (Note: The full name of the peso was the peso de ocho reales, also known as piece of eight or the Spanish dollar, the main currency used by the Spanish; English merchants and government used pounds, shillings and pence. In the late 17th century the peso was worth between five and six shillings.) As they stripped the city of its wealth it is probable that torture was used on the residents to uncover hidden caches of money and jewels. Zahedieh records that there were no first-hand reports from witnesses that confirmed Exquemelin's claim of widespread rape and debauchery. After an attempt by Don Agustín to recapture the city by force – his army of 800 soldiers was repelled by the privateers – he negotiated a ransom of 100,000 pesos. Following the ransom and the plunder of the city, Morgan returned to Port Royal, with between £70,000 and £100,000 of money and valuables; Zahedieh reports that the figures were more than the agricultural output of Jamaica, and nearly half Barbados's sugar exports. Each privateer received £120 – equivalent to five or six times the average annual earnings of a sailor of the time. Morgan received a five per cent share for his work; Modyford received a ten per cent share, which was the price of Morgan's letter of marque. As Morgan had overstepped the limits of his commission, Modyford reported back to London that he had "reproved" him for his actions although, Zahedieh observes, in Britain "Morgan was widely viewed as a national hero and neither he nor Modyford were rebuked for their actions".

=== Lake Maracaibo and Gibraltar (1668–1669) ===
Maracaibo, Cabimas, Ciudad Ojeda and Gibraltar in modern day Venezuela

Morgan did not stay long in Port Royal and in October 1668 sailed with ten ships and 800 men for Île-à-Vache, a small island he used as a rendezvous point. His plan was to attack the Spanish settlement of Cartagena de Indias, the richest and most important city on the Spanish Main. In December he was joined by a former Royal Navy frigate, Oxford, which had been sent to Port Royal to aid in any defence of Jamaica. Modyford sent the vessel to Morgan, who made it his flagship. On 2 January 1669 Morgan called a council of war for all his captains, which took place on Oxford. A spark in the ship's powder magazine destroyed the ship and over 200 of its crew. (Note: Some sources, including Breverton and Allen, state that there were only ten survivors from a crew of 350; Pope states that more than 250 were killed.) Morgan and the captains seated on one side of the table were blown into the water and survived; the four captains on the other side of the table were all killed.

The loss of Oxford meant Morgan's flotilla was too small to attempt an attack on Cartagena. Instead he was persuaded by a French captain under his command to repeat the actions of the pirate François l'Olonnais two years previously: an attack on Maracaibo and Gibraltar, both on Lake Maracaibo in modern-day Venezuela. The French captain knew the approaches to the lagoon, through a narrow and shallow channel. Since l'Olonnais and the French captain had visited Maracaibo, the Spanish had built the San Carlos de la Barra Fortress, 20 miles (32 km) outside the city, on the approach. Talty states that the fortress was placed in an excellent position to defend the town, but that the Spanish had undermanned it, leaving only nine men to load and fire the fortress's 11 guns. Under covering cannon fire from the privateer's flagship, Lilly, Morgan and his men landed on the beach and stormed the fortification; they found it empty when they eventually breached its defences. A search soon found that the Spanish had left a slow-burning fuse leading to the fort's powder kegs as a trap for the buccaneers, which Morgan extinguished. The fort's guns were spiked and then buried so they could not be used against the privateers when they returned from the rest of their mission.

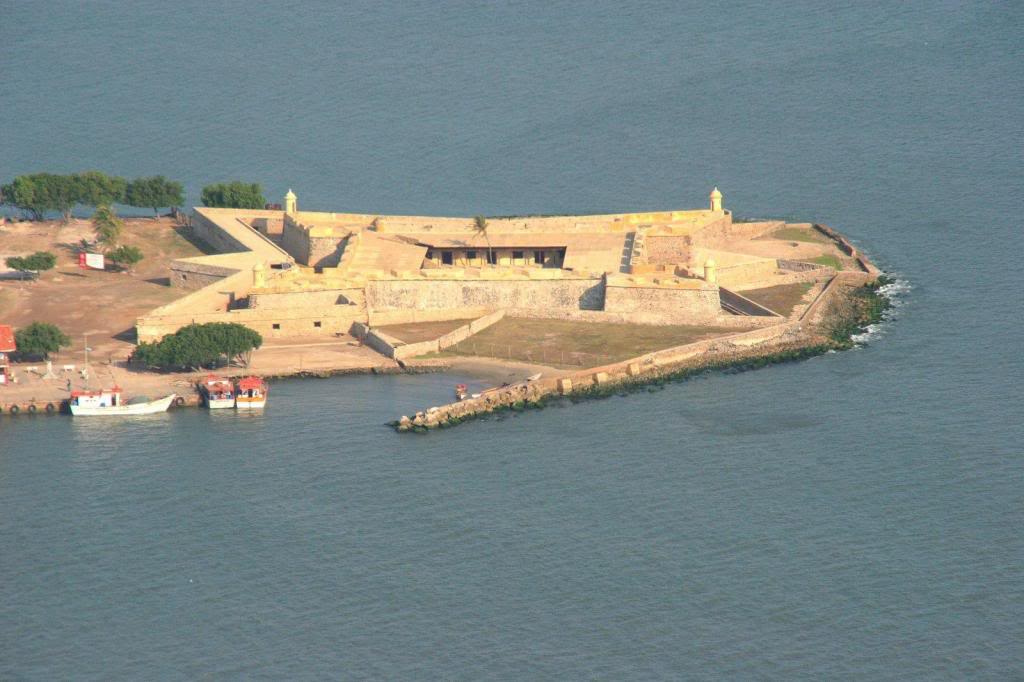
San Carlos de la Barra Fortress, which guarded the entrance to Maracaibo

Morgan arrived at Maracaibo to find the city largely deserted, its residents having been forewarned of his approach by the fortress's troops. He spent three weeks sacking the city. Privateers searched the surrounding jungle to find the escapees; they, and some of the remaining occupants, were tortured to find where money or treasure had been hidden. Satisfied he had stolen all he could, he sailed south across Lake Maracaibo, to Gibraltar. The town's occupants refused to surrender, and the fort fired enough of a barrage to ensure Morgan kept his distance. He anchored a short distance away and his men landed by canoe and assaulted the town from the landward approach. He met scant resistance, as many of the occupants had fled into the surrounding jungle. He spent five weeks in Gibraltar, and there was again evidence that torture was used to force residents to reveal hidden money and valuables.

Four days after he left Maracaibo, Morgan returned. He was told that a Spanish defence squadron, the Armada de Barlovento, was waiting for him at the narrow passage between the Caribbean and Lake Maracaibo, where the San Carlos de la Barra Fortress was sited. The forces, under the command of Don Alonso del Campo y Espinosa, had 126 cannon with which to attack Morgan, and had re-armed San Carlos de la Barra Fortress. The Spaniards had orders to end piracy in the Caribbean, and negotiations between Morgan and Espinosa continued for a week. The final offer put by the Spanish commander was for Morgan to leave all their spoils and slaves and to return to Jamaica unmolested, but no agreement was reached that would allow Morgan and his men to pass the fleet with their spoils but without attack. Morgan put the Spaniards' offers to his men, who voted instead to fight their way out. As they were heavily outgunned, one privateer suggested that a fire ship aimed at Espinosa's flagship, Magdalen would work.

To this end, a crew of 12 prepared a ship that had been seized in Gibraltar. They disguised vertical logs of wood with headwear, to make the Spaniards believe that the vessel was fully crewed. To make it look more heavily armed, additional portholes were cut in the hull and logs placed to resemble cannons. Barrels of powder were placed in the ship and grappling irons laced into the ships rigging, to catch the ropes and sails of Magdalen and ensure the vessels would become entangled.

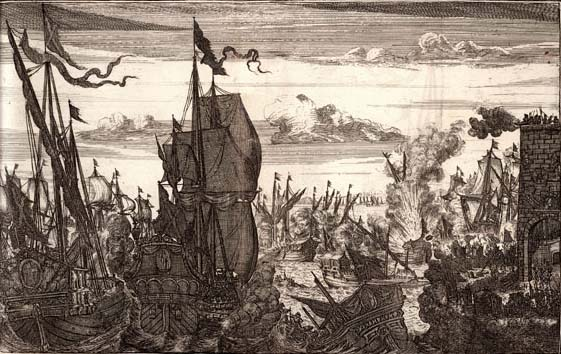
Morgan destroys the Spanish Armada de Barlovento at Lake Maracaibo 1669

On 1 May 1669 Morgan and his flotilla attacked the Spanish squadron. The fire ship plan worked, and Magdalen was shortly aflame; Espinosa abandoned his flagship and made his way to the fort, where he continued to direct events. The second-largest Spanish ship, Soledad, tried to move away from the burning vessel, but a problem with the rigging meant they drifted aimlessly; privateers boarded the ship, fixed the rigging and claimed the craft as plunder. The third Spanish vessel was also sunk by the privateers. Morgan still needed to pass the San Carlos de la Barra Fortress, but was out-gunned by the stronghold, which had the ability to destroy the privateer fleet if it tried to pass. The privateer decided to negotiate, and threatened to sack and burn Maracaibo if he was not allowed to pass. Although Espinosa refused to negotiate, the citizens of Maracaibo entered into talks with Morgan, and agreed to pay him 20,000 pesos and 500 head of cattle if he agreed to leave the city intact. During the course of the negotiations with the Maracaibos, Morgan had undertaken salvage operations on Magdalen, and secured 15,000 pesos from the wreck. Before taking any action, Morgan tallied his takings and divided it equally between his ships, to ensure that it was not all lost if one ship was sunk; it totalled 250,000 pesos, and a huge quantity of merchandise and a number of local slaves.

Morgan observed that Espinosa had set his cannon for a landward attack from the privateers – as they had done previously. The privateers faked a landing of their forces. The fort and its battlements were stripped of men as the Spanish prepared for a night assault from the English forces. That evening, with Spanish forces deployed to repel a landing, Morgan's fleet raised anchor without unfurling their sails; the fleet moved on the tide, raising sail only when it had moved level with the fortress, and Morgan and his men made their way back to Port Royal unscathed. (Note: For his failure in his action, Espinosa was arrested and sent back to Spain.) Zahedieh considers the escape showed Morgan's "characteristic cunning and audacity".

During his absence from Port Royal, a pro-Spanish faction had gained the ear of King Charles II, and English foreign policy had changed accordingly. Modyford admonished Morgan for his action, which had gone beyond his commission, and revoked the letters of marque; no official action was taken against any of the privateers. Morgan invested a share of his prize money in an 836-acre (338 ha) plantation – his second such investment.

=== Attack on Panama (1669–1671) ===
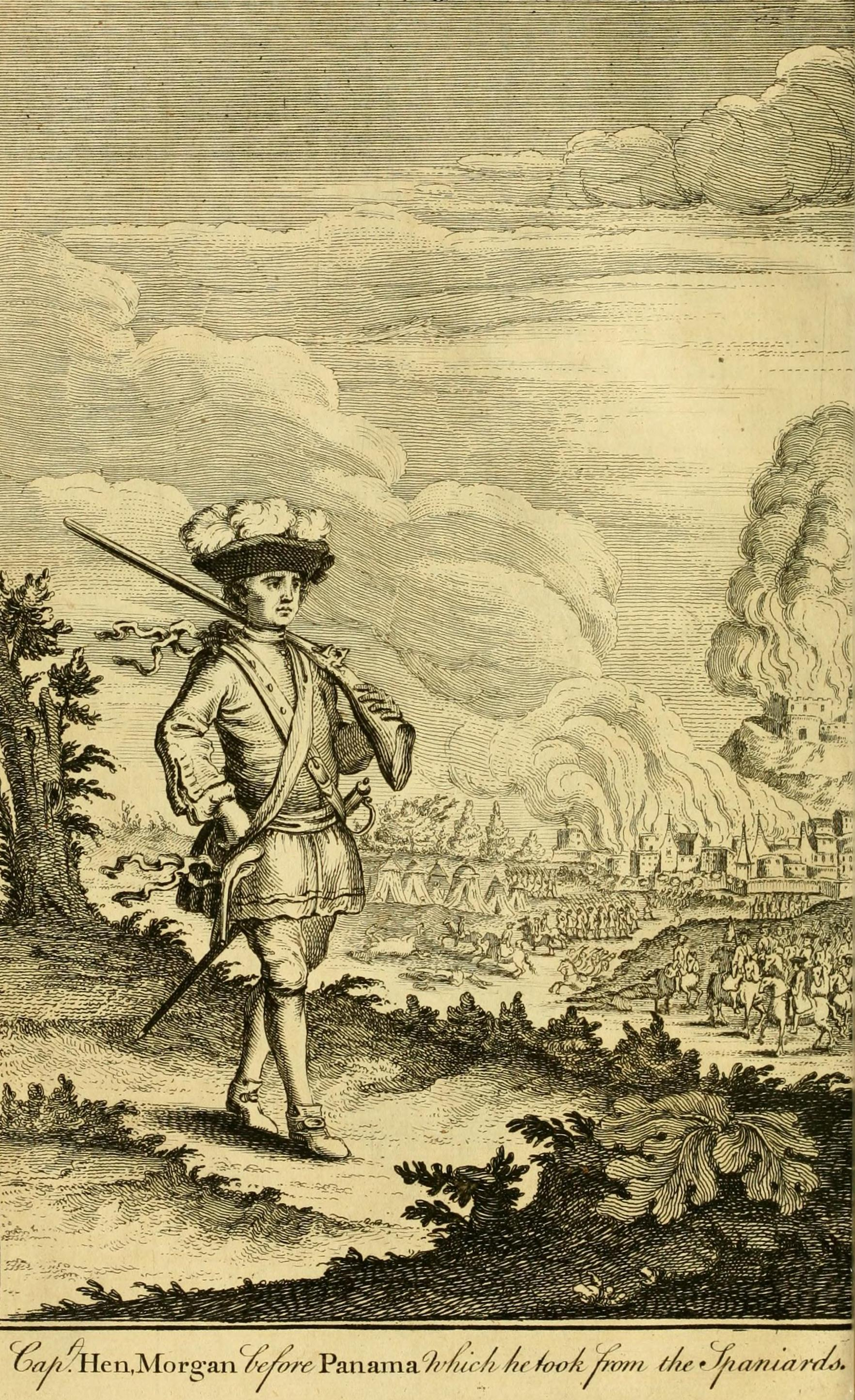
Morgan burning Panama City buildings, 1671 (c. 1736 engraving used to illustrate Captain Charles Johnson's General History)

In 1669 Mariana, the Queen Regent of Spain, ordered attacks on English shipping in the Caribbean. The first action took place in March 1670 when Spanish privateers attacked English trade ships. In response Modyford commissioned Morgan "to do and perform all manner of exploits, which may tend to the preservation and quiet of this island". By December Morgan was sailing toward the Spanish Main with a fleet of over 30 English and French ships carrying a large number of privateers. (Note: The size of Morgan's force differs between sources. Breverton states that Morgan commanded a fleet of 36 English and French ships carrying more than 1,800 privateers; Pope gives the figures of 36 ships and 1,846 men; Thomas writes that it was 37 ships with "2,000 fighting men, beside mariners and boys"; while Zahedieh and Cordingly separately put the figures at 38 ships with 2,000 men.) Zahedieh observes that the army of privateers was the largest that had gathered in the Caribbean at the time, which was "a mark of Morgan's renown".

Morgan's first action was to take the connected islands of Old Providence and Santa Catalina in December 1670. From there his fleet sailed to Chagres, the port from which ships were loaded with goods to transport back to Spain. Morgan took the town and occupied Fort San Lorenzo, which he garrisoned to protect his line of retreat. On 9 January 1671, with his remaining men, he ascended the Chagres River and headed for Panama City, on the Pacific coast. Much of the journey was on foot, through dense rainforests and swamps. The governor of Panama had been forewarned of a potential attack, and had sent Spanish troops to attack Morgan and his men along the route. The privateers transferred to canoes to complete part of the journey, but were still able to beat off the ambushes with ease. After three days, with the river difficult to navigate in places, and with the jungle thinning out, Morgan landed his men and travelled overland across the remaining part of the isthmus.

The privateers, including Captain Robert Searle, arrived at Old Panama City on 27 January 1671; they camped overnight before attacking the following day. They were opposed by approximately 1,200 Spanish infantry and 400 cavalry; most were inexperienced. Morgan sent a 300-strong party of men down a ravine that led to the foot of a small hill on the Spanish right flank. As they disappeared from view, the Spanish front line thought the privateers were retreating, and the left wing broke rank and chased, followed by the remainder of the defending infantry. They were met with well-organised firing from Morgan's main force of troops. When the party came into view at the end of the ravine, they were charged by the Spanish cavalry, but organised fire destroyed the cavalry and the party attacked the flank of the main Spanish force. In an effort to disorganise Morgan's forces, the governor of Panama released two herds of oxen and bulls onto the battlefield; scared by the noise of the gunfire, they turned and stampeded over their keepers and some of the remaining Spanish troops. The battle was a rout: the Spanish lost between 400 and 500 men, against 15 privateers killed.

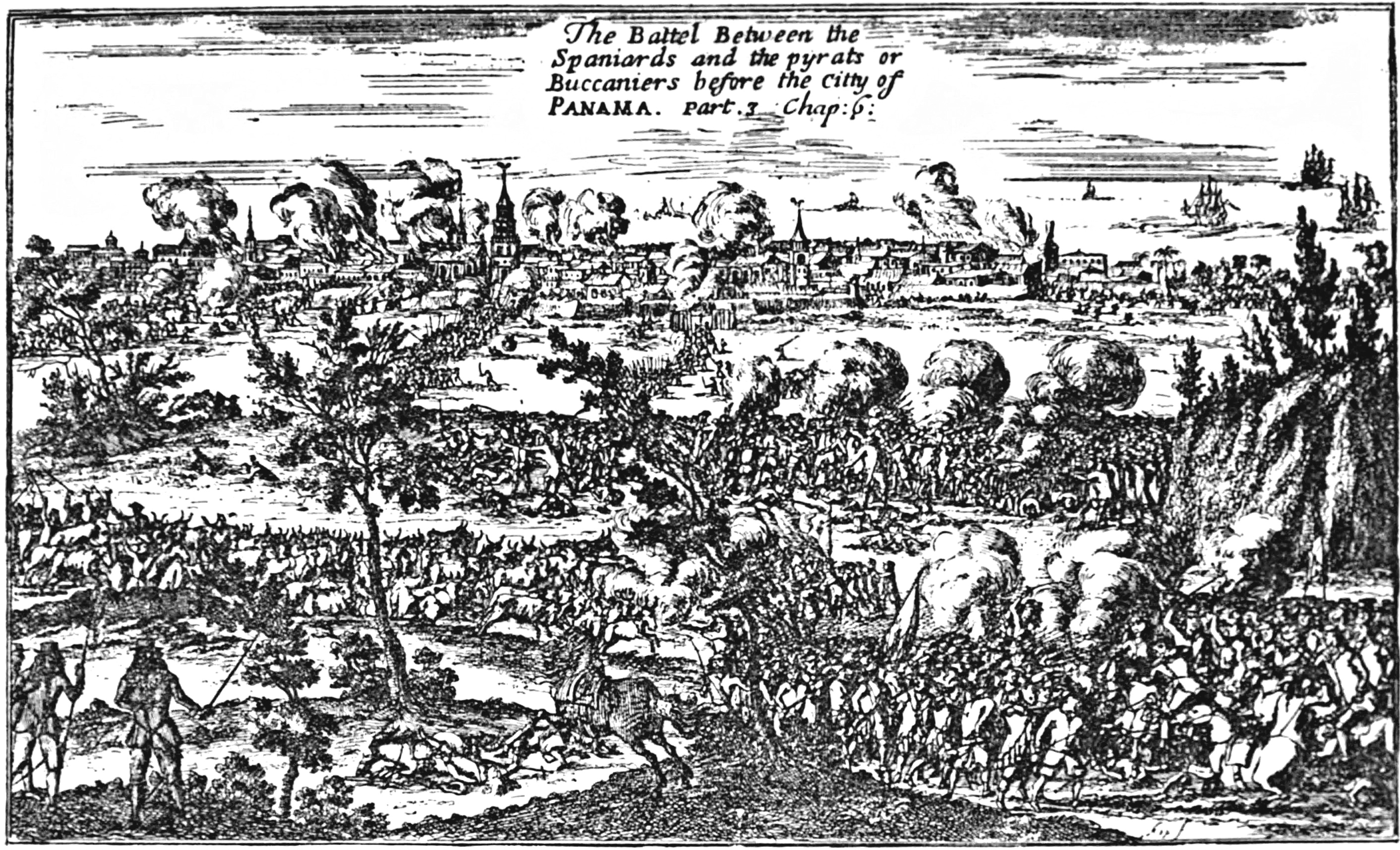
Morgan attacking Panama, 1671

Panama's governor had sworn to burn down the city if his troops lost to the privateers, and he had placed barrels of gunpowder around the largely wooden buildings. These were detonated by the captain of artillery after Morgan's victory; the resultant fires lasted until the following day. (Note: The Spanish later built what is now Panama City six miles down the coast in a more easily defendable position.) Only a few stone buildings remained standing afterwards. Much of Panama's wealth was destroyed in the conflagration, although some had been removed by ships, before the privateers arrived. The privateers spent three weeks in Panama and plundered what they could from the ruins. Morgan's second-in-command, Captain Edward Collier, supervised the torture of some of the city's residents; Morgan's fleet surgeon, Richard Browne, later wrote that at Panama, Morgan "was noble enough to the vanquished enemy".

The value of treasure Morgan collected during his expedition is disputed. Talty writes that the figures range from 140,000 to 400,000 pesos, and that owing to the large army Morgan assembled, the prize-per-man was relatively low, causing discontent. There were accusations, particularly in Exquemelin's memoirs, that Morgan left with the majority of the plunder. He arrived back in Port Royal on 12 March to a positive welcome from the town's inhabitants. The following month he made his official report to the governing Council of Jamaica, and received their formal thanks and congratulations.

== Arrest and release; knighthood and governorship (1672–1675) ==
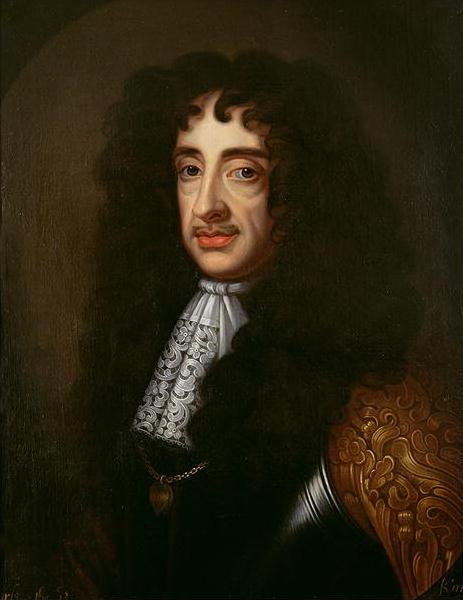
Charles II, who ordered Morgan's arrest, but later knighted him

During Morgan's absence from Jamaica, news reached the island that England and Spain had signed the Treaty of Madrid. (Note: The treaty was signed on 8 July 1670 and was published in the Caribbean in either May or July 1671.) The pact aimed to establish peace in the Caribbean between the two countries; it included an agreement to revoke all letters of marque and similar commissions. The historian Violet Barbour considers it probable that one of the Spanish conditions was the removal of Modyford from the Governorship. Modyford was arrested and sent to England by his replacement Sir Thomas Lynch.

The destruction of Panama so soon after the signing of the treaty led to what Allen describes as "a crisis in international affairs" between England and Spain. The English government heard rumours from their ambassadors in Europe that the Spanish were considering war. In an attempt to appease them, Charles II and his Secretary of State, the Earl of Arlington, ordered Morgan's arrest despite his unfailing loyalty to the English crown. In April 1672 the privateer admiral was returned to London where, Barbour writes, he was "handsomely lionized ... as the hero on whom Drake's mantle had fallen". Although some sources state that Morgan was incarcerated in the Tower of London, (Note: Zahedieh in the Dictionary of National Biography is one such writer.) Pope finds no evidence of this in the Tower records.

Morgan probably remained at liberty throughout his time in London, and the political mood changed in his favour. Arlington asked him to write a memorandum for the King on improving Jamaica's defences. Although Morgan was never charged with an offence, he gave informal evidence to the Lords of Trade and Plantations that he had no knowledge of the Treaty of Madrid prior to his attack on Panama. Unhappy with Lynch's conduct in Jamaica, the King and his advisers decided in January 1674 to replace him with John Vaughan, 3rd Earl of Carbery with Morgan sent as his deputy. King Charles appointed Morgan a Knight Bachelor in November 1674, the first time his Welsh name Harri became officially Anglicised to Henry, a common practice in an age of English dominance. Two months later, Morgan and Carbery left for Jamaica. They were accompanied by Modyford, released from the Tower of London without charge and made the Chief Justice of Jamaica. They travelled on board the Jamaica Merchant, which held cannon and shot meant to boost Port Royal's defences. The ship foundered on the rocks of Île-à-Vache and Morgan and the crew were temporarily stranded on the island until picked up by a passing merchant ship.

== In Jamaican politics (1675–1688) ==
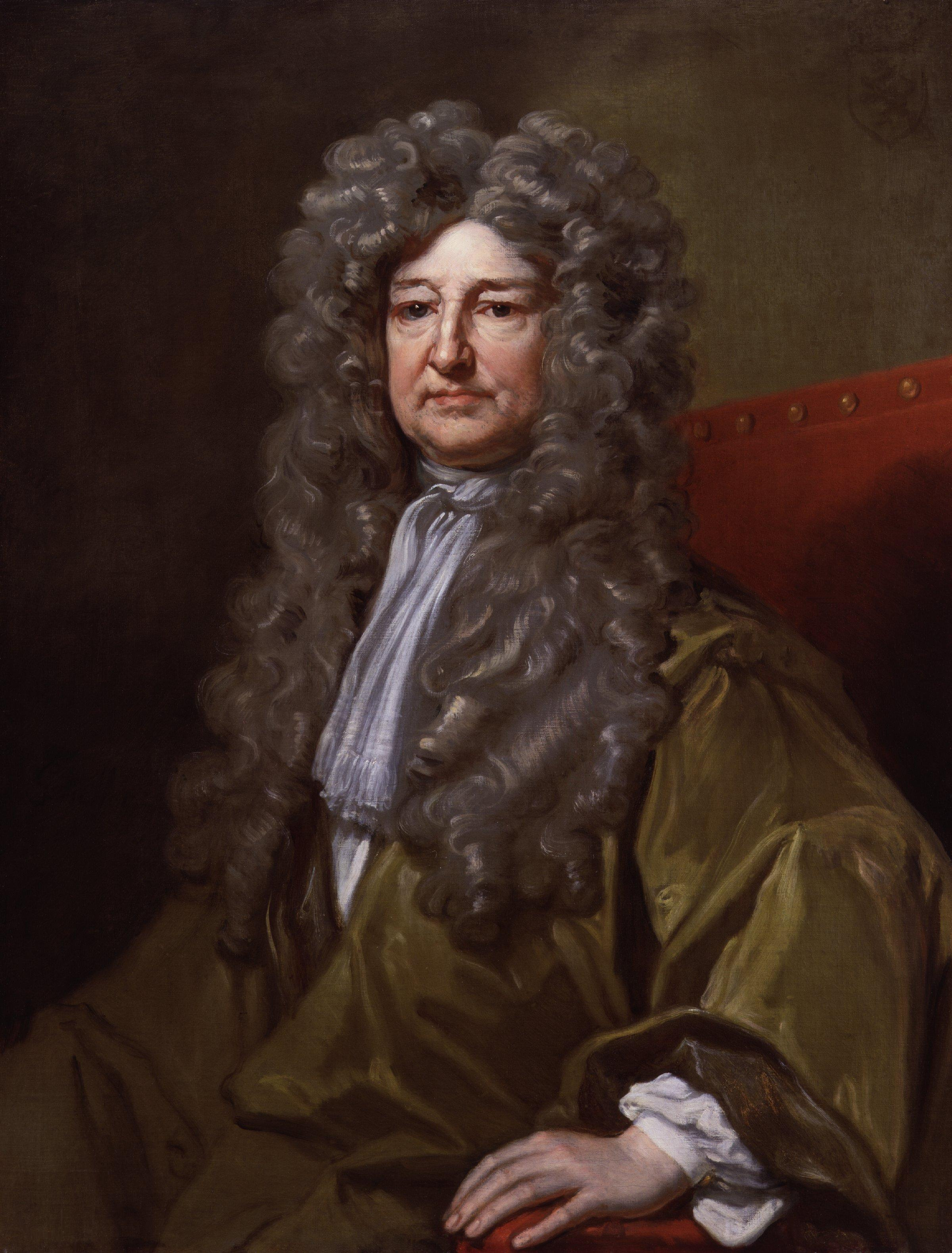
John Vaughan, 3rd Earl of Carbery

On his arrival in Jamaica, the 12-man Assembly of Jamaica voted Morgan an annual salary of £600 "for his good services to the country"; the move angered Carbery, who did not get on with Morgan. Carbery later complained of his deputy that he was "every day more convinced of ... [Morgan's] imprudence and unfitness to have anything to do with civil government". Carbery also wrote to the Secretary of State to bemoan Morgan's "drinking and gaming at the taverns" of Port Royal.

Although Morgan had been ordered to eradicate piracy from Jamaican waters, he continued his friendly relations with many privateer captains, and invested in some of their ships. Zahedieh estimates that there were 1,200 privateers operating in the Caribbean at the time, and Port Royal was their preferred destination. These had a welcome in the city if Morgan received the dues owed to him. As Morgan was no longer able to issue letters of marque to privateer captains, his brother-in-law, Robert Byndloss, directed them to the French governor of Tortuga to have a letter issued; Byndloss and Morgan received a commission for each one signed.

In July 1676 Carbery called for a hearing against Morgan in front of the Assembly of Jamaica, accusing him of collaborating with the French to attack Spanish interests. Morgan admitted he had met the French officials, but indicated that this was diplomatic relations, rather than anything duplicitous. In the summer of 1677 the Lords of Trade said they had yet to come to a decision on the matter and in early 1678 the king and the Privy Council recalled Carbery from Jamaica, leaving Morgan as governor for three months. In July 1678 Charles Howard, 1st Earl of Carlisle, was appointed governor.

By the late 1670s France became an increasing threat in the Caribbean, and Morgan took control of the defence of Port Royal. He declared martial law in 1678 and 1680 – both during his periods as temporary governor of the island – because of the threat of invasion, re-built the fortifications surrounding the town, and increased the number of cannon from 60 to more than 100 in the five years up to 1680.

Morgan and his allies on the Assembly of Jamaica made earnest efforts to deal with privateers and pirates. However, he was soon undermined by his secretary Rowland Powell, who forged his name to an illegal proclamation establishing the monopoly of the Royal African Company. Criticism of Morgan's governance was also fomented in London by two former governors of Jamaica, Carbery and Lynch. After Lynch paid £50,000 to Charles II, Morgan's commissions as lieutenant-governor and lieutenant-general were revoked and Lynch was appointed as the island's governor; Morgan still retained his position on the Assembly of Jamaica. Morgan had been a heavy drinker for several years; (Note: Thomas opines that while Morgan drank to excess, "the drinking was not that of a sad man or a man that drank to forget; it was because he was a larger than life character who spent many of his evenings smoking and drinking, exchanging stories of wild adventures with his peers".) he felt his reputation tarnished and received the news of the revocation of his positions badly, increasing his intake of alcohol to the point where his health began to suffer. Lynch removed Morgan's supporters from the Assembly of Jamaica by 1683, and in October that year he removed Morgan and his brother-in-law, leaving the assembly packed with men loyal to him. In 1684 Lynch died, and was temporarily replaced as governor by his friend, the lieutenant-general, Hender Molesworth.

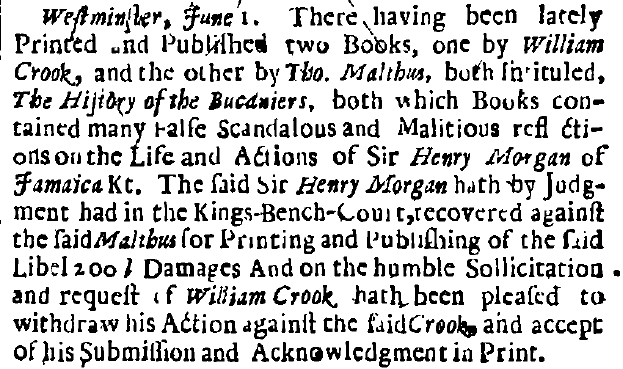
Report from The London Gazette regarding Morgan's successful libel action

In 1684 an account of Morgan's exploits was published by Exquemelin, in a Dutch volume entitled De Americaensche Zee-Roovers (trans: About the Buccaneers of America). Morgan took steps to discredit the book and successfully brought a libel suit against the book's publishers William Crooke and Thomas Malthus. In his affidavit he stated that he had "against evil deeds, piracies and robberies the greatest abhorrence and distrust", and that "for the kind of men called buccaneers", he "always had and still has hatred". The court found in his favour and the book was retracted; damages of £200 were paid to him.

In December 1687 Lynch's permanent replacement arrived in Port George, Morgan's friend from his time in London, Christopher Monck, 2nd Duke of Albemarle. He dismissed Molesworth and gave Morgan an unofficial role as advisor. In July 1688 Albemarle persuaded the king to allow Morgan to regain a position on the Assembly, but the former privateer was too ill to attend. Hans Sloane, Albemarle's private physician, inspected Morgan and diagnosed dropsy; he also saw Morgan was drinking to excess and ordered him to reduce his alcohol intake, a directive which Morgan ignored. Sloane described his patient as

lean, sallow-coloured, his eyes a little yellowish and belly jutting out or prominent ... He complained to me of want of appetite for victuals, he had a kicking ... to vomit every morning and generally a small looseness attending him, and withal is much given to drinking and sitting up late, which I supposed had been the cause of his present indisposition.

== Slave plantations ==
By the 1670s and 1680s, Morgan, as owner of three large plantations, led three campaigns against the Jamaican Maroons of Juan de Serras. Morgan achieved some success against the Maroons, who withdrew further into the Blue Mountains, where they were able to stay out of his reach. However, Morgan failed in his attempts to capture de Serras and subdue his community of runaway slaves.

By the time of his death, Morgan owned three plantations enslaving large numbers of Africans. He left most of his estate to his wife for her lifetime. On her death, most of his land and slaves were passed to his nephew Charles, second son of Robert Byndloss, who served as Chief Justice of Jamaica in 1681. Morgan also left a parcel of land in the now-defunct parish of St George to another Robert Byndloss (born c. 1673) the eldest son of his brother-in-law Robert Byndloss.

Morgan also left some land in Saint Mary Parish, Jamaica, to his friend, Roger Elletson, ancestor of a future governor of Jamaica with the same name. Morgan's will was probated in 1689, and at his death he owned title to 131 Africans as slaves on his estates, 64 men and 67 women, including 33 children, valued at £1,923.

== Death and subsequent events ==
Morgan died on 25 August 1688 at Lawrencefield Estate, located in modern Port Maria, Jamaica. The estate had been owned by one of his lieutenants, Lawrence Prince, recently deceased. Albemarle ordered a state funeral, and laid Morgan's body at King's House for the public to pay respects. An amnesty was declared so that pirates and privateers could pay their respects without fear of arrest. He was buried at Palisadoes cemetery, Port Royal, followed by a 22-gun salute from the ships moored in the harbour. Morgan was a wealthy man when he died. His personal wealth was valued at £5,263, equal to £1,137,756 today.

His will initially left his plantations and slaves to his wife, Mary Elizabeth, but because they were childless, on her death his estate was to pass to his nephews, the children of his brother-in-law Byndloss. The burial of Lady Morgan was recorded in Saint Andrew Parish, Jamaica, on 3 March 1696.

In his will, signed on 17 June 1688, Morgan left his Jamaican property to his godsons Charles Byndloss and Henry Archbold, on condition they adopted the surname of Morgan. These were the children of his two cousins Anna Petronilla Byndloss and Johanna Archbold. To his sister Catherine Loyd he awarded £60 per annum (equal to £12970.81 today) from his estate "paid into the hands of my ever honest cozen [sic] Thomas Morgan of Tredegar".

On 7 June 1692 an earthquake struck Port Royal. About two-thirds of the town, amounting to 33 acres (13 ha), sank into Kingston Harbour immediately after the main shock. Palisadoes cemetery, including Morgan's grave, was one of the parts of the city to fall into the sea; his body has never been subsequently located.

== Legacy ==
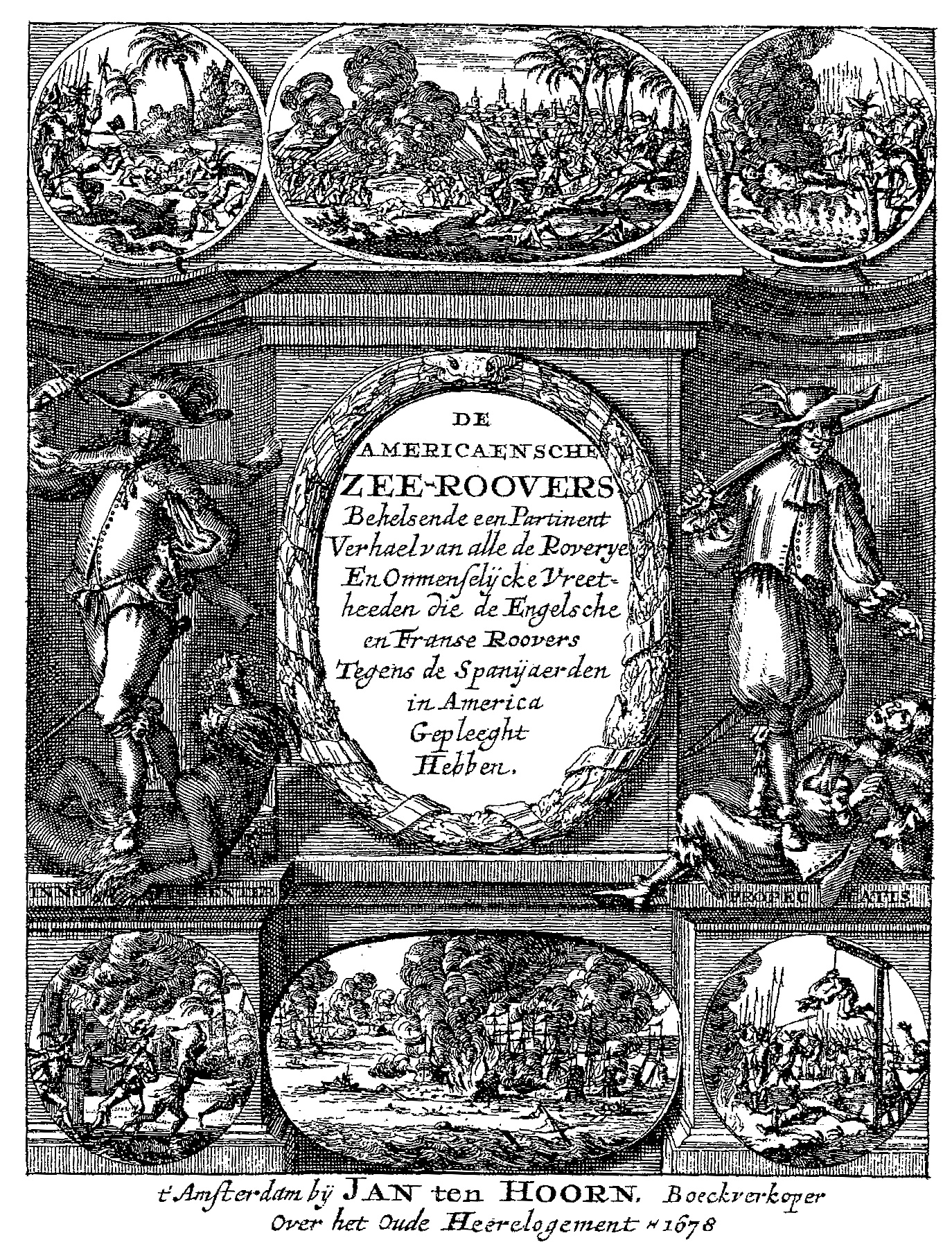
Alexandre Exquemelin's De Americaensche Zee-Roovers (1678) which affected history's view of Morgan

Rogoziński observes that Morgan is probably the "best-known pirate" because of Exquemelin's book, although, Cordingly writes that Exquemelin bore a grudge over what he saw was Morgan's theft of the bounty from Panama. His experience explains "why he painted such a black picture of Morgan and portrayed him as a cruel and unscrupulous villain", which subsequently affected historians' view of Morgan. Allen observes that, partly because of Exquemelin, Morgan has not been well-served by historians. He cites the examples of the historians whose biographies were so flawed they wrote that Morgan had died in either London, prison or the Tower of London. These included Charles Leslie, A New History of Jamaica (1739), Alan Gardner, History of Jamaica (1873), Hubert Bancroft, History of Central America (1883) and Howard Pyle's work, Howard Pyle's Book of Pirates (compiled in 1921).

Exquemelin wrote that Morgan's men undertook widespread torture in several of the towns they captured. According to Stephen Snelders, in his history of piracy, the Spanish reports of Morgan's raids do not refer to torture being practiced on the residents of Porto Bello or Gibraltar – although there are reliable reports that it was carried out in Panama. The historian Patrick Pringle observes that while torture seems cruel and ruthless to contemporary eyes, it was an accepted part of judicial interrogation in many European countries at the time. (Note: Pringle identifies legal use of judicial torture in Scotland until 1708, in France until 1789 and the Spanish – as part of the Inquisition until the 1830s.) Morgan always fought with a commission from the governor of Jamaica. In doing so, he was acting as a reserve naval force for the English government in the defence of Jamaica. As the Spanish did not recognise privateering as a legal activity, even if a captain carried letters of marque, they considered Morgan to be a pirate, something he firmly rejected.

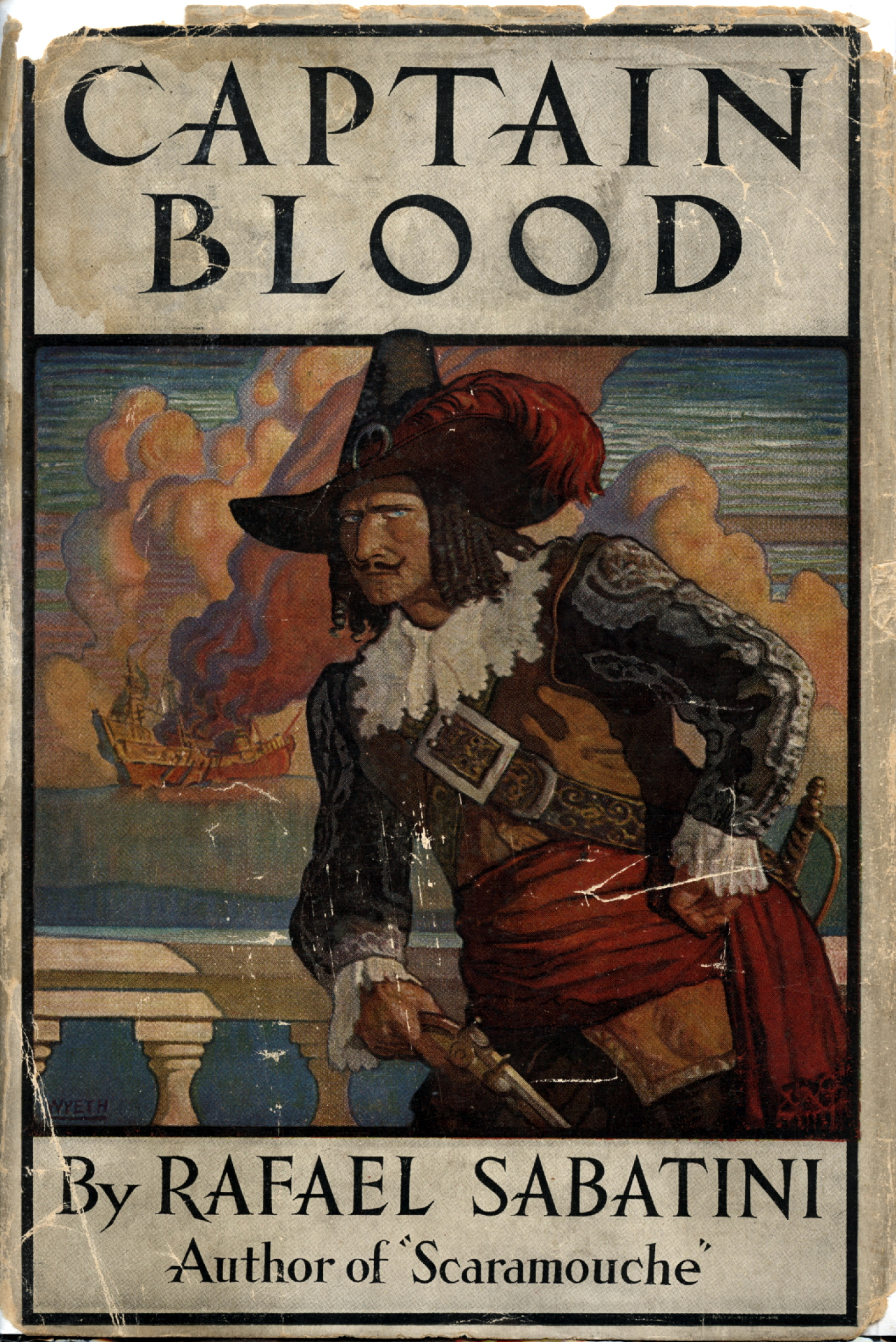
Rafael Sabatini's 1922 novel Captain Blood is based in large part on Morgan's career.

Rogoziński observes that Morgan does not appear in later fictional works as much as other pirates because of his "ambiguous mixture of charismatic leadership and selfish treachery", although his name and persona have featured in literature, including Rafael Sabatini's 1922 novel Captain Blood and John Steinbeck's first novel, Cup of Gold (1929), both of which are based in large part on Morgan's career. Morgan and stories of a hidden haul of treasure also feature to a lesser extent in other works, including Ian Fleming's 1954 novel Live and Let Die and John Masefield's 1920 poem "Captain Stratton's Fancy". (Note: "Captain Stratton's Fancy" was later set to music by Peter Warlock.) Screen renditions of his life include Captain Blood (1935), The Black Swan (1942), (Note: Captain Blood and The Black Swan were adapted from the respective Sabatini novels of the same name.) Blackbeard the Pirate (1952), Morgan, the Pirate (1961), Pirates of Tortuga (1961) and The Black Corsair (1976). Morgan has also been featured in several video games, including Sid Meier's Pirates! and Age of Pirates 2: City of Abandoned Ships.

In 1944 the Seagram Company started manufacturing the Captain Morgan brand of rum, named after the privateer. In 2001 the Captain Morgan brand was sold to Diageo, the multinational drinks company based in London. The name of Morgan has been attached to local sites in the Caribbean, such as Morgan's Bridge, Morgan's Pass and Morgan's Valley in Clarendon, Morgan's Harbour Hotel and Beach Club in Kingston, the Hotel Henry Morgan, located in Roatán, Honduras, the Port Morgan resort located in Haiti and Captain Morgan's Retreat and Vacation Club on Ambergris Caye, Belize.

The economist Peter Leeson believes that pirates and privateers were generally shrewd businessmen, far removed from the modern, romanticised view of them as murderous brigands. The anthropologist Anne M. Galvin and the historian Kris Lane both view Morgan as seeking wealth to enter the landed gentry; Galvin wrote that Morgan pursued "social mobility through self-interested acts of outlawry, political wiles, and business acumen". Glenn Blalock, writing for the American National Biography, claims that Morgan was a hero to many Jamaicans and British both for his exploits as a buccaneer and for defending Jamaica for the British Empire. However, some Jamaicans see Morgan as a "criminal pirate" who sought to maintain the system of slavery.

Thomas describes Morgan as

a man of courage, determination, bravery, and ... charisma. He was a planner, a brilliant military strategist and intensely loyal to the king, to England and to Jamaica. ... But unlike so many of the Brethren, he was flexible and adaptable, able to see that the future for Jamaica lay not in plunder or pillage but in peaceful trade. ... He was also an adept politician and held office longer than any of the governors of his time.

== Sources ==
=== Books ===
- Allen, H. R. (1976). Buccaneer: Admiral Sir Henry Morgan. London: Arthur Baker. ISBN 978-0-213-16569-7.
- Breverton, Terry (2005). Admiral Sir Henry Morgan: The Greatest Buccaneer of them all. Pencader, Carmarthenshire: Glyndŵr Publishing. ISBN 978-1-903529-17-1.
- Campbell, Mavis (1988). The Maroons of Jamaica 1655–1796: a History of Resistance, Collaboration & Betrayal. Granby, MA: Bergin & Garvey. ISBN 978-0-8978-9148-6.
- Cordingly, David (2006) [1996]. Under the Black Flag: The Romance and Reality of Life Among the Pirates. London: Random House. ISBN 978-0-8129-7722-6.
- Cornell, Jimmy (2014). World Cruising Routes: 1000 Sailing Routes in All Oceans of the World. London: Bloomsbury Publishing. ISBN 978-1-4081-5888-3.
- Cundall, Frank (1936). The Governors of Jamaica in the Seventeenth Century. London: The West India Committee. OCLC 3262925.
- Curtis, Wayne (2007). And a Bottle of Rum: A History of the New World in Ten Cocktails. New York: Three Rivers Press. ISBN 978-0-307-51285-7.
- Earle, Peter (2007). The Sack of Panamá: Captain Morgan and the Battle for the Caribbean. New York: Thomas Dunne Books. ISBN 978-0-312-36142-6.
- Exquemelin, John (2010) [1684]. The Buccaneers of America: A True Account of the Most Remarkable Assaults Committed of Late Years Upon the Coasts of the West Indies by the Buccaneers of Jamaica and Tortuga. Cambridge University Press: Cambridge. ISBN 978-1-108-02481-5.
- Francis, John Michael (2006). Iberia and the Americas: Culture, Politics, and History: a Multidisciplinary Encyclopedia. Santa Barbara, CA: ABC-CLIO. ISBN 978-1-85109-421-9.
- Gosse, Phillip (2007) [1932]. The History of Piracy. Mineola, NY: Dover Publications. ISBN 978-0-486-46183-0.
- Hold, Trevor (2005). Parry to Finzi: Twenty English Song-composers. Woodbridge, Suffolk: Boydell Press. ISBN 978-1-84383-174-7.
- Latimer, Jon (2009). Buccaneers of the Caribbean: How Piracy Forged an Empire. Cambridge, MA: Harvard University Press. ISBN 978-0-674-03403-7.
- Little, Benerson (2007). The Buccaneer's Realm: Pirate Life on the Spanish Main, 1674–1688. Washington, DC: Potomac Books. ISBN 978-1-59797-101-0.
- Lycett, Andrew (1996). Ian Fleming. London: Phoenix. ISBN 978-1-85799-783-5.
- McGilligan, Patrick (1986). Backstory: Interviews with Screenwriters of Hollywood's Golden Age. Oakland, CA: University of California Press. ISBN 978-0-520-05689-3.
- Paxman, Jeremy (2011). Empire. London: Viking. ISBN 978-0-670-91957-4.
- Pope, Dudley (1978) [1977 (in the UK, as Harry Morgan's Way)]. The Buccaneer King: The Biography of the Notorious Sir Henry Morgan 1635–1688. New York: Dodd, Mead & Co. ISBN 978-0-396-07566-0.
- Pringle, Patrick (2001) [1953]. Jolly Roger: The Story of the Great Age of Piracy (Kindle ed.). Mineola, NY: Dover Publications. ISBN 978-0-486-14759-8.
- Rogoziński, Jan (1995). Pirates!: Brigands, Buccaneers, and Privateers in Fact, Fiction, and Legend: An A–Z Encyclopedia. New York: Facts on File. ISBN 978-0-8160-2761-3.
- Snelders, Stephen (2005). The Devil's Anarchy: The Sea Robberies of the Most Famous Pirate Claes G. Compaen, and The Very Remarkable Travels of Jan Erasmus Reyning, Buccaneer. Brooklyn, NY: Autonomedia. ISBN 978-1-57027-161-8.
- Talty, Stephan (2007). Empire of Blue Water: Henry Morgan and the Pirates Who Ruled the Caribbean Waves. London: Simon & Schuster. ISBN 978-1-4165-0293-7.
- Thomas, Graham (2014). The Buccaneer King: the Story of Captain Henry Morgan (Kindle ed.). Barnsley, South Yorkshire: Pen & Sword Maritime. ISBN 978-1-4738-3522-1.

=== Online resources ===
- "The Black Swan". Afi Catalog. American Film Institute.
- Blalock, Glenn (2000). "Morgan, Sir Henry". American National Biography. Oxford University Press. (subscription required)
- Burke, Michael (21 December 2017). "Similarities with the first Christmas". Jamaica Observer.
- Burke, Michael (3 May 2018). "Columbus, Education and Jamaica today". Jamaica Observer.
- Burnard, Trevor (2004). "Lynch, Sir Thomas (d. 1684)". Oxford Dictionary of National Biography (online ed.). Oxford University Press. doi:10.1093/ref:odnb/17260. (Subscription, Wikipedia Library access or UK public library membership required.)
- "Captain Blood". American Film Institute.
- "Captain Morgan's Retreat". Islands Magazine: 94. November 2005.
- "Diageo Company History". Archived from the original on 4 April 2007.
- Firaxis (15 November 2004). "Pirates of Pirates!". IGN.
- Folliott, Kathryn (30 October 2014). "Orlando tailors promotion to Canadians Picks of the Week". The Toronto Star. p. T4.
- "Historic Earthquakes: Jamaica: 1692 June 07 UTC". U.S. Geological Survey. 6 April 2016.
- Knighton, C. S. (2008). "Myngs, Sir Christopher (bap. 1625, d. 1666)". Oxford Dictionary of National Biography (online ed.). Oxford University Press. doi:10.1093/ref:odnb/19708. (Subscription, Wikipedia Library access or UK public library membership required.)
- Matson, John (26 November 2008). "What Would Blackbeard Do? Why Piracy Pays". Scientific American.
- "Monmouthshire". Encyclopaedia Britannica.
- "Sir Henry Morgan". Legacies of British Slavery database. University College London.
- Tortello, Rebecca (7 June 2004). "The People Who Came". Jamaica Gleaner.
- Tortello, Rebecca (9 December 2002). "Jamaica Gleaner: Pieces of the Past: Henry Morgan, The Pirate King". Jamaica Gleaner.
- Williams, David (1959). "Morgan, Henry (1635? – 1688), Buccaneer". Dictionary of Welsh Biography. National Library of Wales.
- Zahedieh, Nuala (2004a). "Morgan, Sir Henry (c.1635–1688)". Oxford Dictionary of National Biography (online ed.). Oxford University Press. doi:10.1093/ref:odnb/19224. (Subscription, Wikipedia Library access or UK public library membership required.)
- Zahedieh, Nuala (2004b). "Modyford, Sir Thomas, First Baronet (c.1620–1679)". Oxford Dictionary of National Biography (online ed.). Oxford University Press. doi:10.1093/ref:odnb/18871. (Subscription, Wikipedia Library access or UK public library membership required.)

=== Journals and magazines ===
- Barbour, Violet (April 1911). "Privateers and Pirates of the West Indies". The American Historical Review. 16 (3): 529–566. doi:10.2307/1834836. JSTOR 1834836.
- Dawdy, Shannon Lee; Bonni, Joe (June 2012). "Towards a General Theory of Piracy". Anthropological Quarterly. 85 (3): 673–699. doi:10.1353/anq.2012.0043. JSTOR 41857267. S2CID 145510457.
- Galvin, Anne M. (Summer 2012). "Caribbean Piracies/Social Mobilities: Some Commonalities Between Colonial Privateers and Entrepreneurial 'Profiteers' in the 21st Century". Anthropological Quarterly. 85 (3): 755–784. doi:10.1353/anq.2012.0049. JSTOR 41857270. S2CID 145105515.
- Lane, Kris (2000). "The Sweet Trade Revived". New West Indian Guide. 74 (1 & 2): 91–97. doi:10.1163/13822373-90002571. JSTOR 41850027.
- Patel, Samir S. (March–April 2013). "Pirates of the Original Panama Canal". Archaeology. 66 (2): 30–37. JSTOR 41804641.

Government offices
Preceded by Sir Thomas Lynch	Lieutenant Governor of Jamaica acting 1674–1675	Succeeded by John Vaughan, 3rd Earl of Carbery
Preceded by John Vaughan, 3rd Earl of Carbery	Lieutenant Governor of Jamaica acting 1678	Succeeded by Charles Howard, 1st Earl of Carlisle
Preceded by Charles Howard, 1st Earl of Carlisle	Lieutenant Governor of Jamaica acting 1680–1682	Succeeded by Sir Thomas Lynch
