= Raid on Santiago de Cuba (1662) =

1662 raid by English buccaneers

- Part of the Anglo-Spanish War (1654–1671)
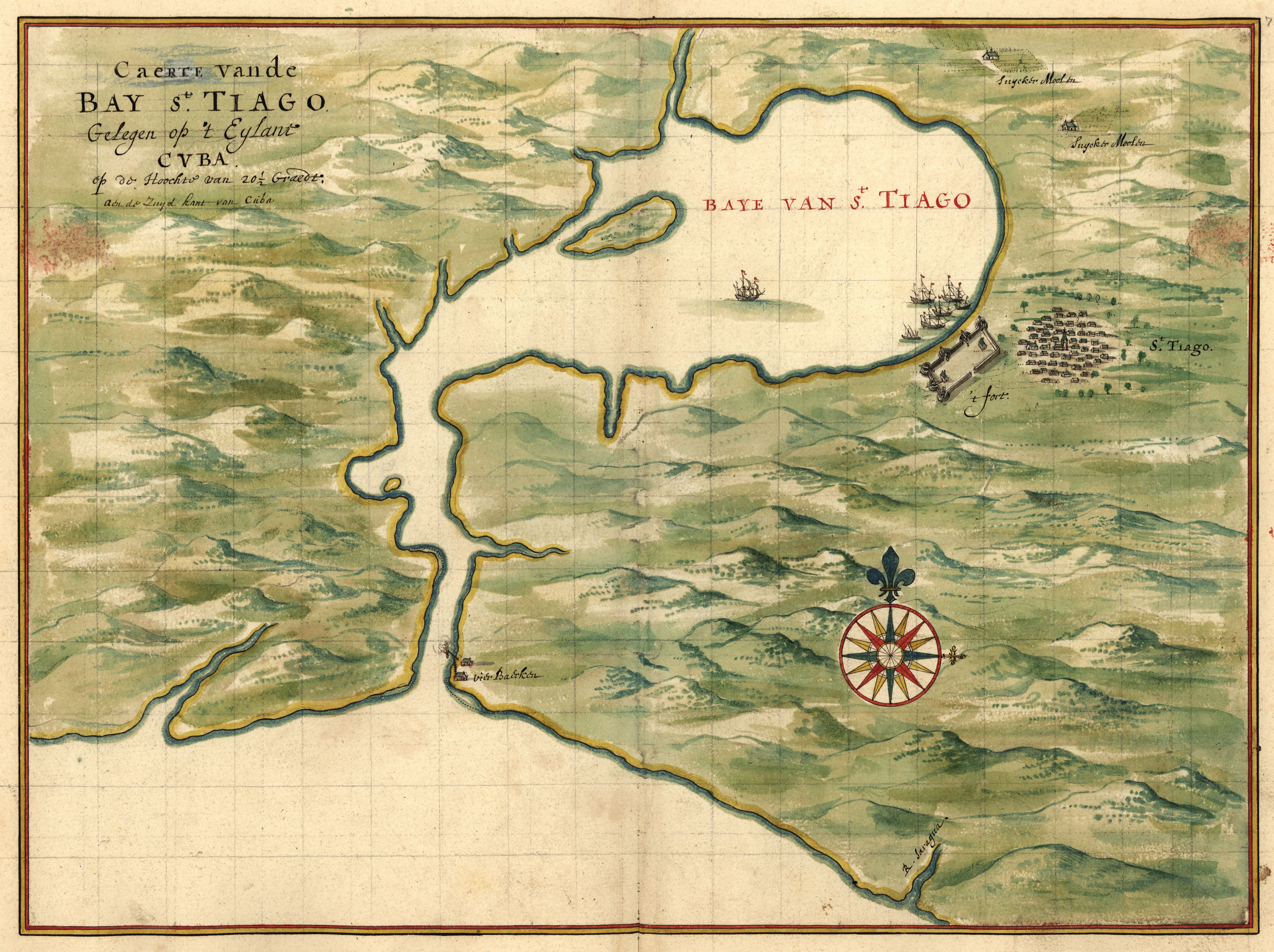
- Seventeenth century map of Santiago de Cuba
Date	19 – 25 October, 1662
Location	Santiago de Cuba, Cuba
Result	English victory

Belligerents
Spain	England

Commanders and leaders
(Spain) Pedro de Morales	(Kingdom of England) Christopher Myngs

Strength
500 militia	14 ships 1,400 men

Casualties and losses
500 killed, wounded or captured 6 ships captured	30 killed or wounded

The Raid on Santiago de Cuba took place on 19 October 1662 during the Anglo-Spanish War on the Spanish colony of Cuba. In fear of a Spanish attack on Jamaica, the governor Thomas Hickman-Windsor gaver orders to Royal Navy captain Christopher Myngs to launch a preemptive attack. Myngs' force of fourteen vessels, carrying around 1,400 buccaneers sortied from Port Royal and assaulted Santiago de Cuba. The town despite its strong defences was captured and sacked, resulting in a financial and military success.

== Background ==
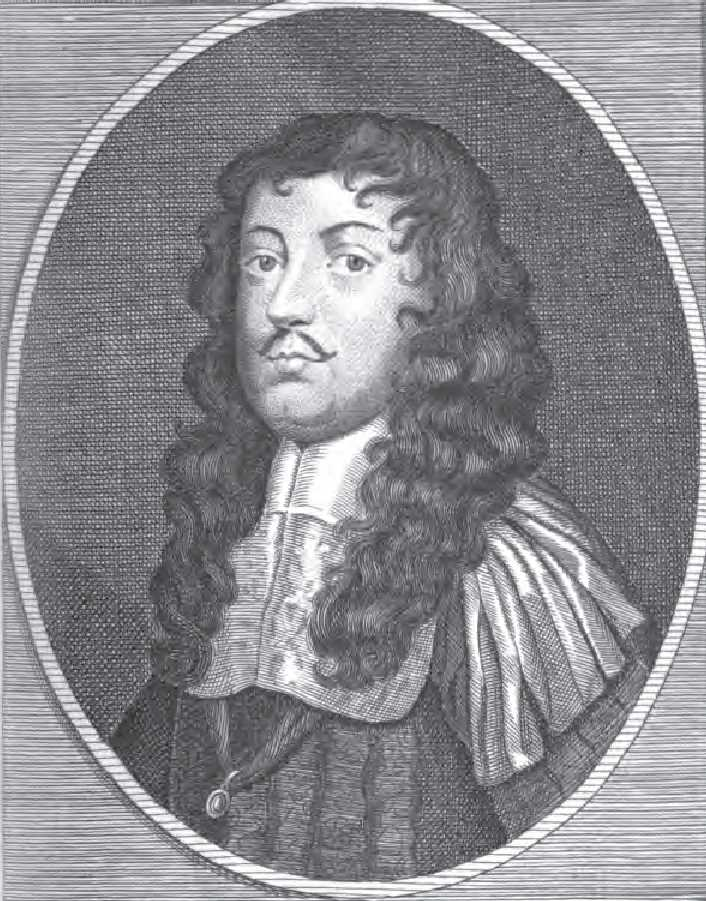
Christopher Myngs

England had taken possession of Jamaica in 1657 from Spain in 1657. With the threat of a Spanish counterattack, Buccaneers were invited, to base themselves at Port Royal, to help defend against Spanish attacks. Christopher Myngs of the Commonwealth Navy became the subcommander of the naval flotilla on the Jamaica Station, in 1658. In September 1658, Governor Edward D'Oyley ordered Myngs to launch attack on the Spanish Main hoping to stave off an invasion. Myngs sets out and burned the towns of Tolu and Santa Marta, seizing a good haul of treasure.

Following the Restoration of Charles II in 1660 the war in Europe had ceased but there was no treaty. England and Spain thus remained in a state of war in the Caribbean.

The new governor Thomas Hickman-Windsor hoped for a trade agreement between England and Spain in the Caribbean to settle the matter. In September the merchant vessel Griffin carried Spanish dispatches denying requests for trade. Sensing a Spanish counter attack, Windsor inaugurated an aggressive new policy by authorising letters of marque for privateering commissions. Volunteers were summoned for a major expedition to be led by Myngs against the Spanish and within three days 1,300 men had assembled, many of them former soldiers.

Myngs' flagship, the galleon Centurion as well as the Griffin were joined by ten privateering vessels, including one commanded by a 27 year-old militia captain named Henry Morgan. Myngs was to lead the force against Santiago de Cuba, which the English believed was the main Spanish advance base to reconquer Jamaica. Cristóbal Arnaldo de Issasi a former governor and guerrilla leader on Jamaica, had fled there after the English conquest. He had twice attempted to retake the island, but both times (in 1657 and in 1658) failed with heavy losses.

== Raid ==
On 1 October, Myngs' flotilla departed Port Royal, rounded Point Negril and headed towards Cuba in light winds. The intention was to break into Santiago de Cuba's harbour though the narrow channel between the high cliffs by counting on the element of surprise. As they approached a Cay they made chance encounter with Thomas Whetstone's ships which were sighted anchored in the lee of a cay. Whetstone had been operating off that coast for some time without a commission (he was therefore a pirate) from the English crown, with a largely Native Caribbean crew. Myngs' force joined him, and a conference was held aboard Centurion. Myngs was told by Whetstone that the city was lightly defended and therefore made the decision to make a land assault.

At daybreak the following day, the English arrived within sight of the large 34 gun fort guarding Santiago's harbour entrance, the San Pedro de la Roca castle. The approach was made difficult by shallows and scant winds, and Myngs therefore was unable to close to bombard. Finally, late in the afternoon Myngs decided to veer towards Aguadores Village, two miles distant Eastward at the mouth of the San Juan River. By nightfall 1,000 men had landed ashore against no resistance. The English then advanced inland through darkened woods by torchlight to the city which was some six miles to the west along the San Juan River. Myngs then decided to burst directly into the Spanish port, hoping to take it by surprise. As they approached the English saw that the city was defended by a hastily built barricade of earth filled barrels. The assault was met at Las Lagunas outside the gates by 170 hastily mustered Spanish regulars and two field pieces under Governor Pedro de Morales. His small force was backed by 200 militia under Cristóbal Arnaldo de Issasi. The English stormed through the defences and despite the rest of the militia coming to the aid of the retreating defenders, the town was conquered soon after. Most of the militia were routed, captured and locked up in the town, but the rest managed to flee to the woods further East. Six vessels attempting to escape were captured by the buccaneers who each swam with a cutlass in teeth and boarded the boats.

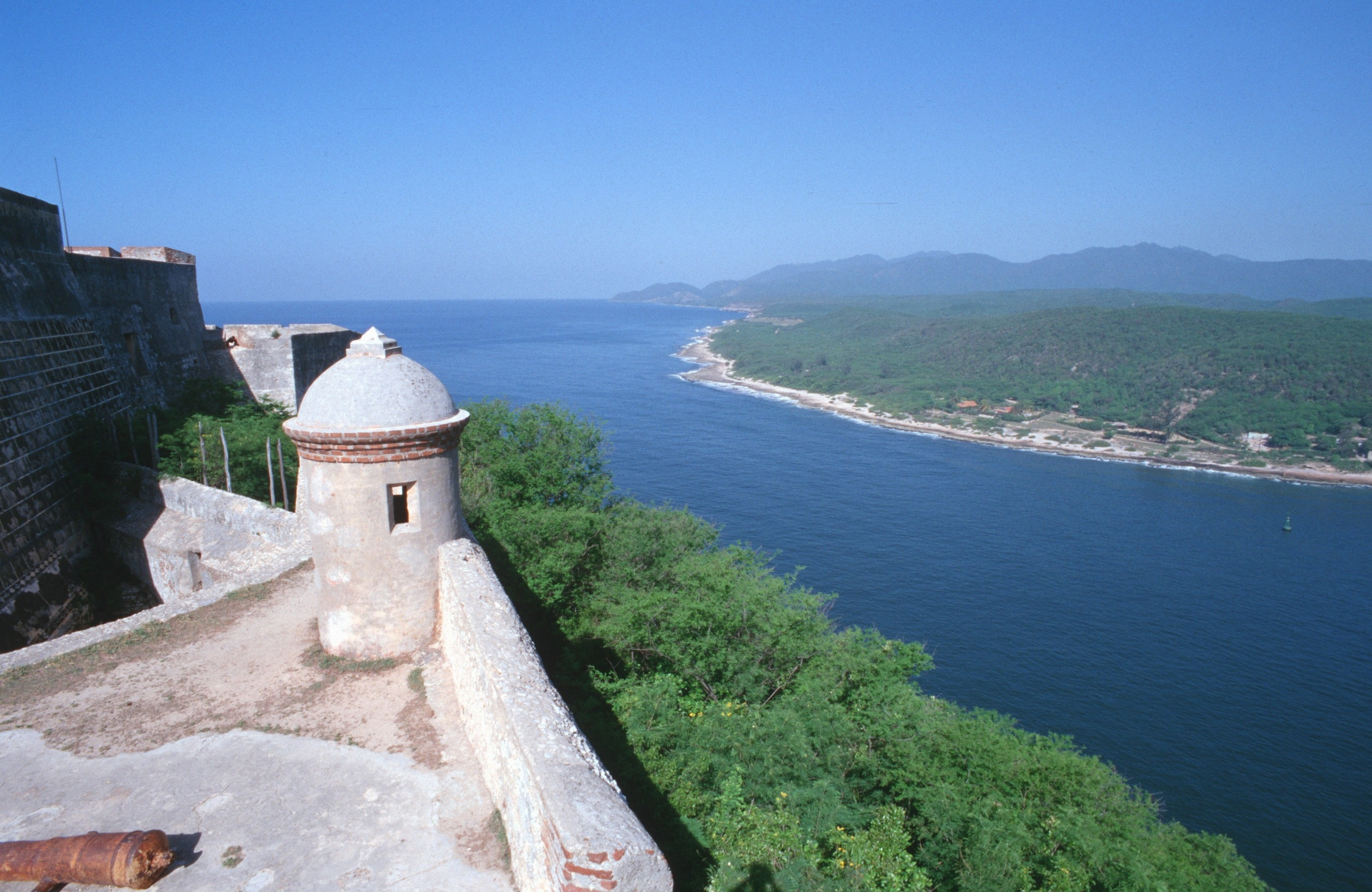
Present day view of Castillo del Morro

Meanwhile, the San Pedro de la Roca castle guarding the harbour, was attacked from land in conjunction with a naval bombardment from Myngs' flotilla offshore. A detachment from Myngs' land force made its way round the undefended rear of the castle but the isolated thirty man garrison had already deserted. The English ships then entered unchallenged completing the conquest of the city.

The English pursued the rest of Spaniards inland, hoping to seize their riches, but over the next five days very little was found. Myngs then let his men loose, systematically destroying buildings and sacking the city in general. The Cathedral Basilica of Santiago de Cuba was set on fire and subsequently destroyed.

Myngs then gave orders to demolish the fortifications of San Pedro de la Roca as well as Santiago's principal buildings. He used the 700 barrels of powder from the forts magazines for the demolition. The lighter cannons were taken as booty while the heavier ones were tossed over the cliffs. After fours days of demolition work, San Pedro de la Roca was completely leveled.

On 25 October, Myngs departed taking with him the booty, guns and even the church bells, as well as his six prizes, the seventh being scuttled.

== Aftermath ==
The fleet returned to Port Royal with a "sizeable haul" and there were drunken celebrations. Once the booty had been counted however, a large force meant a larger dispersal; so for the average privateer each share was disappointing. The expedition was a however a success and deterred any further Spanish aggression against Jamaica. The English had lost only six men killed with another twenty succumbing to disease. Myngs soon became aware of the change in the political situation; Governor Windsor had sailed for England three days earlier having complained of ill health, leaving power in the hands of Jamaica's newly created local assembly, to which Myngs has been elected during his absence.

The Spanish reacted angrily to the raid – Sir Richard Fanshawe the ambassador to Portugal was told of a letter that had been sent to King Charles in response. In it Spain demanded Jamaica be restored back, but the demand fell on deaf English ears. Following on from the success of the raid, buccaneers from all over the Caribbean joined Myngs for the announced next expedition. In early 1663 he directed the largest buccaneer fleet as yet assembled, fourteen ships strong and with 1,400 buccaneers aboard, among them Henry Morgan and Abraham Blauvelt. They went on to sack Campeche in February, which proved lucrative.

The Spanish had declared Myngs as a common pirate and mass murderer with a reputation for "unnecessary cruelty," and threatened war with England. This would prompt King Charles to send in Governor Thomas Modyford to Jamaica to get Myngs to cease said actions. Modyford within two years realises the Spanish threat and instead sent out letters of marque, further increasing tensions between Spain and England.

== See also ==
- Raid on Santiago de Cuba (1603)
- Battle of the Aguadores

== Sources ==
- Bradley, Peter T (1999). British Maritime Enterprise in the New World From the Late Fifteenth to the Mid-eighteenth Century. Edwin Mellen Press. ISBN 9780773478664.
- Davenport, Frances Gardiner; Paullin, Charles Oscar, eds. (2004). European Treaties Bearing on the History of the United States and Its Dependencies: Issue 254. The Lawbook Exchange, Ltd. ISBN 9781584774228.
- Konstam, Angus (2011). Pirates The Complete History from 1300 BC to the Present Day ·. Globe Pequot. ISBN 9780762768356.
- Marley, David (2010). Pirates of the Americas, Volume 1. ABC-CLIO. ISBN 9781598842012.
- Latimer, Jon (2009). Buccaneers of the Caribbean: How Piracy Forged an Empire. Harvard University Press. ISBN 978-0-674-03403-7.
- Pestana, Carla Gardina (2017). The English Conquest of Jamaica: Oliver Cromwell's Bid for Empire. Harvard University Press. ISBN 9780674737310.
- Pope, Dudley (1978). The Buccaneer King: The Biography of the Notorious Sir Henry Morgan 1635–1688x (in the UK, as Harry Morgan's Way). New York: Dodd, Mead & Co. ISBN 978-0-396-07566-0.
- Snelders, Stephen (2005). The Devil's Anarchy The Sea Robberies of the Most Famous Pirate Claes G. Compaen, and The Very Remarkable Travels of Jan Erasmus Reyning, Buccaneer. Autonomedia. ISBN 9781570271618.
