= Raid on Santiago de Cuba (1603) =

Military event that took place towards the end of the Anglo–Spanish War in May 1603

Capture of Santiago de Cuba
- Part of the Anglo–Spanish War
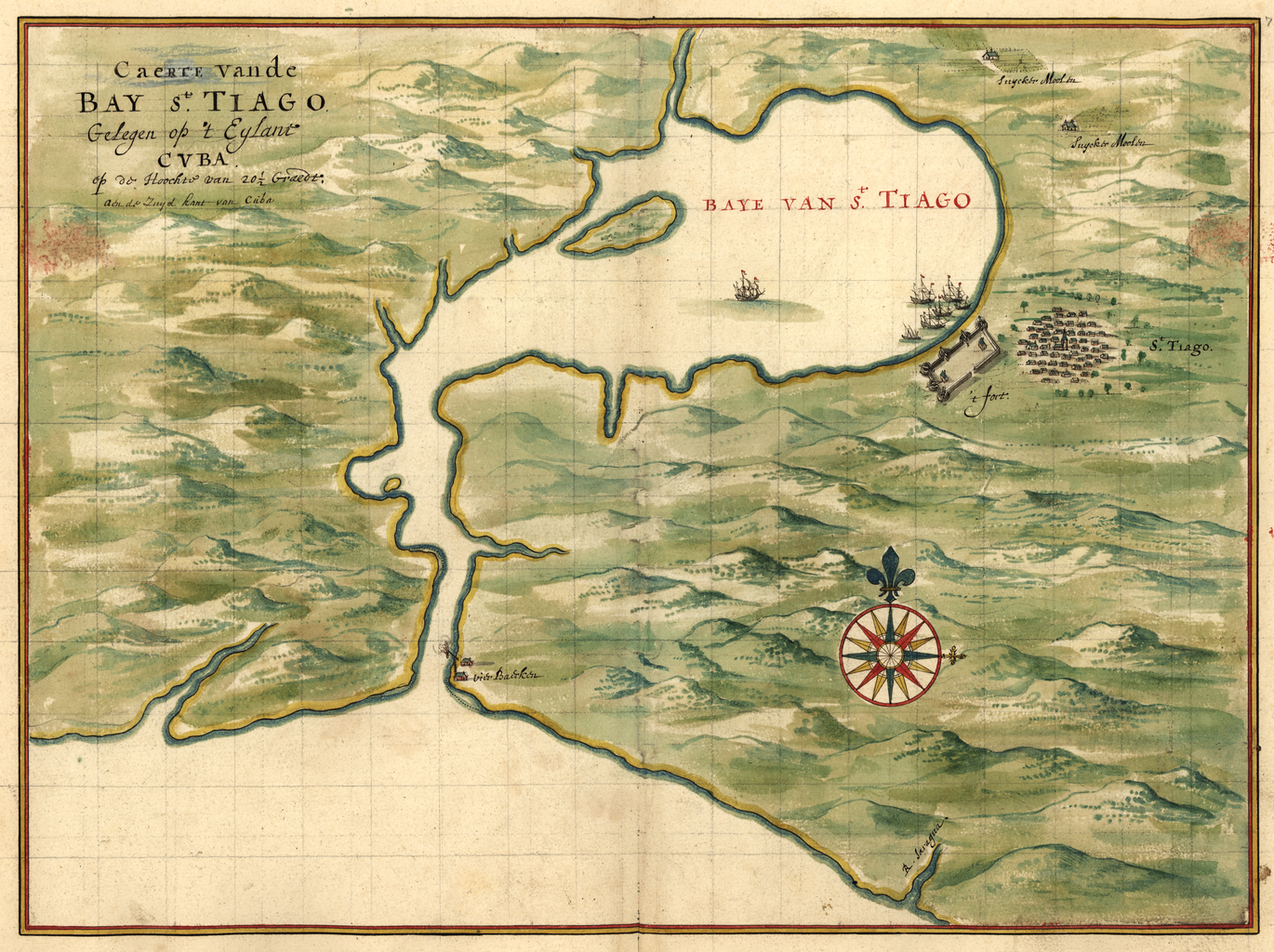
- Map of the Bay of Santiago de Cuba
Date	12 May 1603
Location	Santiago de Cuba (Present-day Cuba)
Result	English victory

Belligerents
Spain	England

Commanders and leaders
Pedro de Valdés	Christopher Cleeve

Strength
Militia & fortification	2 ships 200

Casualties and losses
4 vessels burned	Unknown

The Capture of Santiago de Cuba was a minor military event that took place towards the end of the Anglo–Spanish War in May 1603. Santiago de Cuba was attacked and sacked by English privateers led by Christopher Cleeve.

== Events ==
=== Background ===
In late February 1603 Christopher Cleeve, in the large armed merchant galleon Elizabeth and Cleeve along with a pinnace left England on a privateering expedition to raid the Spanish Main, funded largely by a number of London Merchants.

Cleeve arrived in the Caribbean in April. Cleeve's main target was Santiago de Cuba, which had not been attacked by the English since the outbreak of the Anglo-Spanish war. Santiago de Cuba was the second largest town in Cuba, having been founded in 1515. The town had been targeted by pirates and privateers before, notably in 1553.

=== Raid ===
On 12 May 1603 the English landed in a bay near Santiago de Cuba and met no resistance. They captured the small but unfinished fort, a ravelin and battery on the south-western beach of the promontory which covered the bay from the land side. Cleeve's men then marched towards the town and launched an attack. They surprised the militia, who attempted some resistance before being overwhelmed. The English then entered the city and sacked it. Many of the buildings were plundered, including the Cathedral Basilica of Our Lady of the Assumption, and a considerable amount of booty was acquired.

The city was occupied for a few days before a ransom was attempted, but having no response with this, Cleeve ordered his men to set fire to many buildings including the cathedral. All the fortifications were dismantled or destroyed and four vessels in the city harbour were plundered and burnt. Most of Santiago de Cuba was destroyed, and the English left with their booty unmolested after having been in the city for just under a week.

=== Aftermath ===
Cleeve then descended on Spanish Jamaica but left, finding supplies and booty too few. On his way back home past Cuba, he intercepted and captured two small galleons in the Old Bahama Channel on 28 August that conveyed the new Spanish governor of Florida, Pedro de Ibarra, who was taken prisoner.

The raid on Santiago was to be the last major attack on the Spanish Main by the English after nearly thirty years. Soon after, James I ordered all privateers to cease while peace negotiations with the Spanish were being held in London, resulting in the Treaty of London.

The English returned in 1662 for another strike at the city led by Christopher Myngs; this led to the destruction of the city as well as the destruction of the Castillo de San Pedro de la Roca.
