= Sack of Campeche (1663) =

1663 raid by buccaneers

- Part of the Anglo-Spanish War (1654–1671)
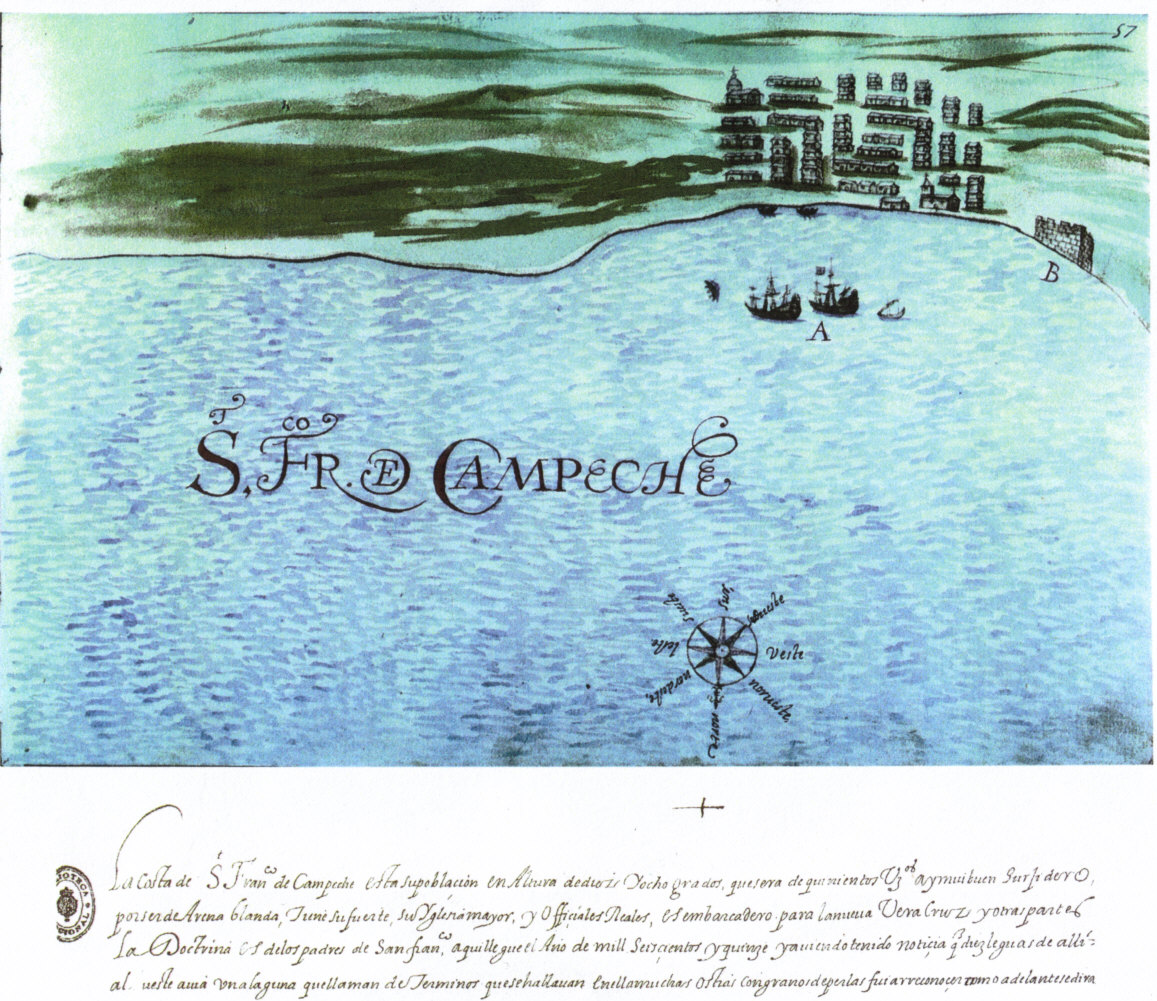
- Detail of a 17th-century map showing Campeche and its fortifications
Date	8 February 1663
Location	Campeche, Spanish Main
Result	English victory

Belligerents
Spain	England

Commanders and leaders
(Spain) Unknown	(Kingdom of England) Christopher Myngs

Strength
150 militia	14 ships 1,400 men

Casualties and losses
50 killed or wounded 14 ships captured	30 killed or wounded

The Sack of Campeche, known to later Spanish historians as Mansfield's Assault, was a 1663 raid by buccaneers led by Christopher Myngs and Edward Mansvelt which became a model for later coastal raids of the buccaneering era.

== Background ==
England and Spain had remained in a state of war in the Caribbean following the Restoration of Charles II in 1660. England having taken possession of Jamaica since 1657 had yet to be confirmed by Spain in a treaty. As a result, Buccaneers were invited, to base themselves at Port Royal, to help defend against Spanish attacks.

Having successfully raided Santiago de Cuba in 1662, Myngs announced that his next target would be the heavily fortified coastal town, Campeche, in what is now southern Mexico. Captains from across the Caribbean volunteered their services, and Myngs amassed the largest buccaneer fleet ever seen with fourteen ships and 1,400 men. The primarily English fleet was subsequently joined by four French ships and three Dutch ships for a total of more than twenty vessels. Leading the fleet was Myngs' flagship HMS Centurion and the smaller vice-flagship the Griffin. The fleet included already-well-known buccaneers Mansvelt, Henry Morgan and Abraham Blauvelt. It is likely it included other younger sailors who would later captain vessels of their own and replicate Myngs' tactics. They left Port Royal in January, joined by other smaller vessels as they went but losing contact with the Griffin.

== The raid ==
Early the following month, the fleet arrived in Campeche Bay. By night, Myngs landed approximately 1,000 men a short distance from the city on 8 February 1663. The following morning, Spanish lookouts saw the fleet's smaller ships at first light and sought to raise the alarm, though unaware that Myngs' much larger forty gun flagship lay just out of sight. Regardless, the warning came too late and the buccaneers attacked at approximately 8:00 am. They initially struggled against the city's 150-strong militia who used high ground of flat-roofed stone houses to their advantage. Fighting was fierce and Myngs was injured. He was returned to his ship leaving Mansvelt in charge.

After a two hour-long battle, fifty Spanish defenders and thirty English, Dutch and French buccaneers were dead. The sole surviving Spanish official agreed to terms of surrender and the buccaneers sacked the city, taking an additional fourteen vessels from the harbour when they left two weeks later. They also plundered a total of 150,000 Spanish pieces of eight.

== Aftermath ==
Myngs returned to England the following year to recover from his injuries.

The defeat of Campeche's defences was so comprehensive and the subsequent outrage so strong that King Charles was forced to forbid further similar raids. That policy was enforced across the Caribbean during the term of Governor Thomas Modyford.

By 1667 however diplomatic relations between England and Spain had worsened, and rumours began to circulate in Jamaica about a possible Spanish invasion. Attacks led by Captain Henry Morgan were authorised by Modyford leading to raids across the Spanish Main. This culminated in the devastating raid on Panama in 1671, but by which time peace had been signed between England and Spain.

== See also ==
- Piracy in the Caribbean
