= Edward Mansvelt =

17th-century Dutch privateer

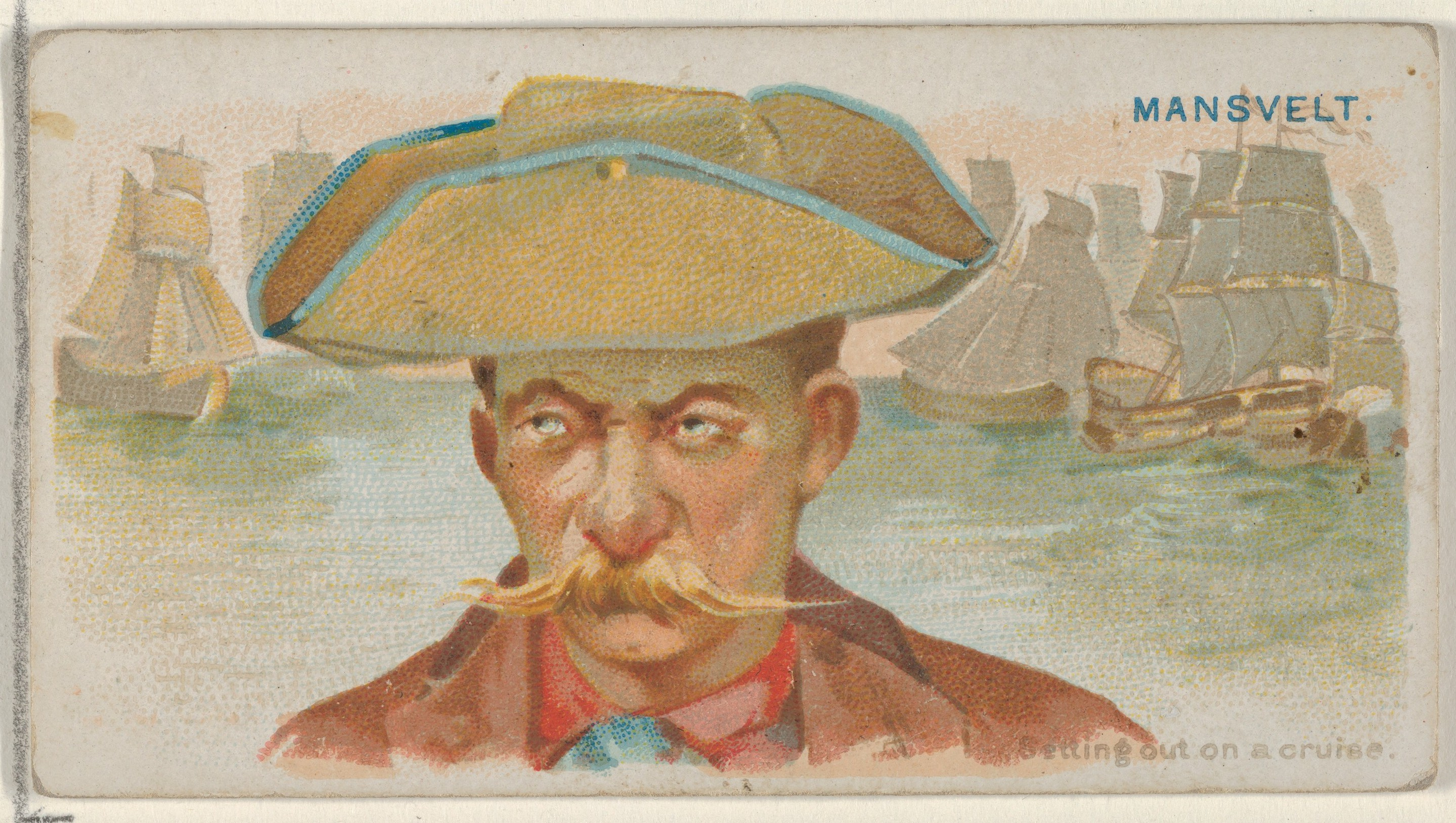
- Born: Curaçao
- Died: Isle of St. Catherine
- Piratical career
- Type: Buccaneer
- Allegiance: England
- Years active: 1650s–1660s
- Rank: Admiral
- Base of operations: Port Royal

Edward Mansvelt or Mansfield (fl. 1659–1666) was a 17th-century Dutch corsair and buccaneer who, at one time, was acknowledged as an informal chieftain of the "Brethren of the Coast". He was the first to organise large scale raids against Spanish settlements, tactics which would be utilised to attack Spanish strongholds by later buccaneers in future years, and held considerable influence in Tortuga and Port Royal. He was widely considered one of the finest buccaneers of his day and, following his death, his position was assumed by his protégé and vice-admiral, Henry Morgan.

== Biography ==
His background is largely obscure, with conflicting accounts as a Dutchman from Curaçao or an Englishman, and is usually referred to by the surnames Mansvelt or Mansfield. He is first recorded accepting a privateering commission from Governor Edward D'Oyley at Port Royal in 1659. Based from Jamaica during the early-1660s, he began raiding Spanish shipping and coastal settlements, travelling overland as far as the Pacific coast of South America. When Christopher Myngs was injured during the Sack of Campeche in 1663, Mansvelt took control of the 1000-man landing party and sacked the city, negotiating the surrender himself and capturing 14 vessels in port. Thereafter, he commanded his own ships and pirate crews, using similar tactics to raid smaller settlements.

In late 1665, he attacked a Cuban village with 200 buccaneers. Soon after this raid, he was offered a commission by the newly appointed governor, Thomas Modyford, at Port Royal, to sail against the Dutch at Curaçao. His men refused to fight the Dutch however, some themselves being Dutchman, while others believed it would be far more lucrative to continue their raids against the Spanish.

In January 1666, Mansvelt and his crew left Jamaica. According to writer and historian, Alexandre Exquemelin, Mansvelt led the fleet which captured and looted Granada and the Isle of St. Catherine, although this is disputed. He was, however, elected admiral of the fleet, consisting between 10 and 15 ships and an estimated 500 men. Sailing for Costa Rica in April, he intended to attack Cartago several miles inland but was turned back by heavy resistance from Spanish defenders near Turrialba. Several members chose to leave the expedition to return to Jamaica or Tortuga after this setback; however, Mansvelt took what remained of the fleet successfully raiding the Isle of St. Catherine and capturing the island of Santa Catalina, also known as Providencia or Providence Island, a name given to it by English Puritans who had settled it in 1630. The island was controlled by Spain at the time Mansvelt arrived.

After occupying the St. Catharine, Mansvelt sent word to Port Royal for reinforcements in order to use the island as a base to attack the Spanish. The island was likely Providencia, located 100 miles off Nicaragua. He failed to persuade the governor in his request, as well as his attempts to use the island as a pirate haven, and died of a sudden illness. Another version, again according to Exquemelin, claims he sailed from the island to Tortuga where he was captured by the Spanish in Cuba and executed for piracy in Portobelo.

Regardless, his authority was assumed by another rising buccaneering captain, Henry Morgan, following news of his death.
