= Shannon Lee Dawdy =

American anthropologist, historian, and archaeologist

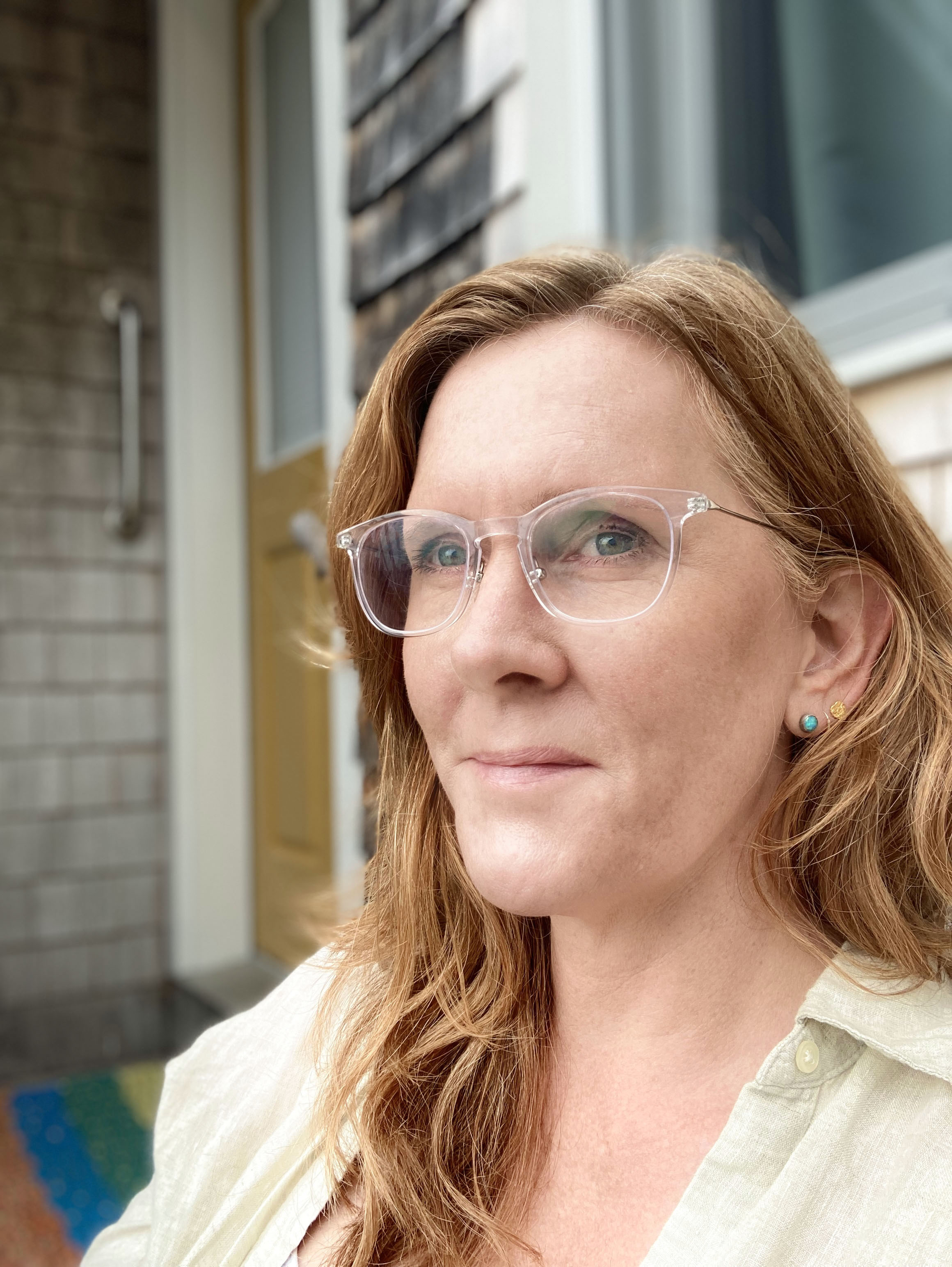
- Dawdy in 2021
- Born: July 1967 (age 59); Santa Rosa, California

Academic background
- Education: University of Michigan

Academic work
- Discipline: Anthropology Archaeology
- Institutions: University of Chicago

Shannon Lee Dawdy is an American anthropologist, historian, and archaeologist. She is professor emerita at the University of Chicago, a MacArthur Fellow, and founder of the Future Café Network, a nonprofit that promotes grassroots futurism. She is known for her interdisciplinary innovations and public engagement, particularly in New Orleans, Louisiana. Her work has been featured by the New York Times, Science, Psychology Today, Archaeology, and various podcasts.

== Education ==
Dawdy holds a PhD in anthropology and history and an MA in history from the University of Michigan, an MA in anthropology from the College of William and Mary and a BA in anthropology from Reed College.

== Research, Writing, and Awards ==
Dawdy taught in the Department Anthropology at the University of Chicago from 2004 to 2025 where she was a Full Professor and served as department chair, as well as co-director of 3CT (Chicago Center for Contemporary Theory). She now works as an independent author and director of the Future Café Network. Geographically, her fieldwork has centered on the Americas, with a special focus on New Orleans and the Gulf of Mexico. Topics of her research include daily life in colonial Louisiana, informal economies, piracy, urban landscapes, death, disaster, and cultural conceptions of time, including the far future. Her most recent publications examine contemporary life through the lens of archaeology, including the edited volume Undoing Things: How Objects, Bodies and Worlds Come Apart (2025, Routledge), and an award-winning book and related documentary film, American Afterlives: Reinventing Death in the Twenty-first Century (2021, Princeton) and I Like Dirt. (2021, with co-director Daniel Zox). She writes for both academic and general audiences. Dawdy has authored or co-edited seven books and published over 60 articles and book chapters.

In 2010, Dawdy was named a MacArthur Fellow for her work in New Orleans following Hurricane Katrina. Her work has received honors and support from several major organizations, including the National Endowment for the Humanities and the National Science Foundation. In 2008 she received the John L. Cotter Award from the Society for Historical Archaeology for her early contributions to the field.

== Bibliography ==
- Lucas, Gavin and Shannon Lee Dawdy, eds. (2025). Undoing Things: How Objects, Bodies and Worlds Come Apart. Routledge. ISBN 978-1-032-06182-5
- Dawdy, Shannon Lee and Tamara Kneese, eds. (2022). The New Death: Mortality and Death Care in the Twenty-first Century. School of American Research/University of New Mexico Press. ISBN 978-0-8263-6345-9
- Dawdy, Shannon Lee (2021). American Afterlives: Reinventing Death in the Twenty-first Century. Princeton University Press. ISBN 978-0-691-21064-3.
- Dawdy, Shannon Lee (2016). Patina: A Profane Archaeology. University of Chicago Press. ISBN 978-0-226-35119-3.
- Dawdy, Shannon Lee (2008). Building the Devil's Empire: French Colonial New Orleans. University of Chicago Press. ISBN 978-0-226-13841-1.
- Curet, Antonio, Shannon Lee Dawdy, Gabino LaRosa Corzo, eds. (2005). Dialogues in Cuban Archaeology. University of Alabama Press. ISBN 978-0-8173-5187-8
