= Christopher Myngs =

English naval officer and privateer (1625–1666)

Vice-Admiral Sir Christopher Myngs
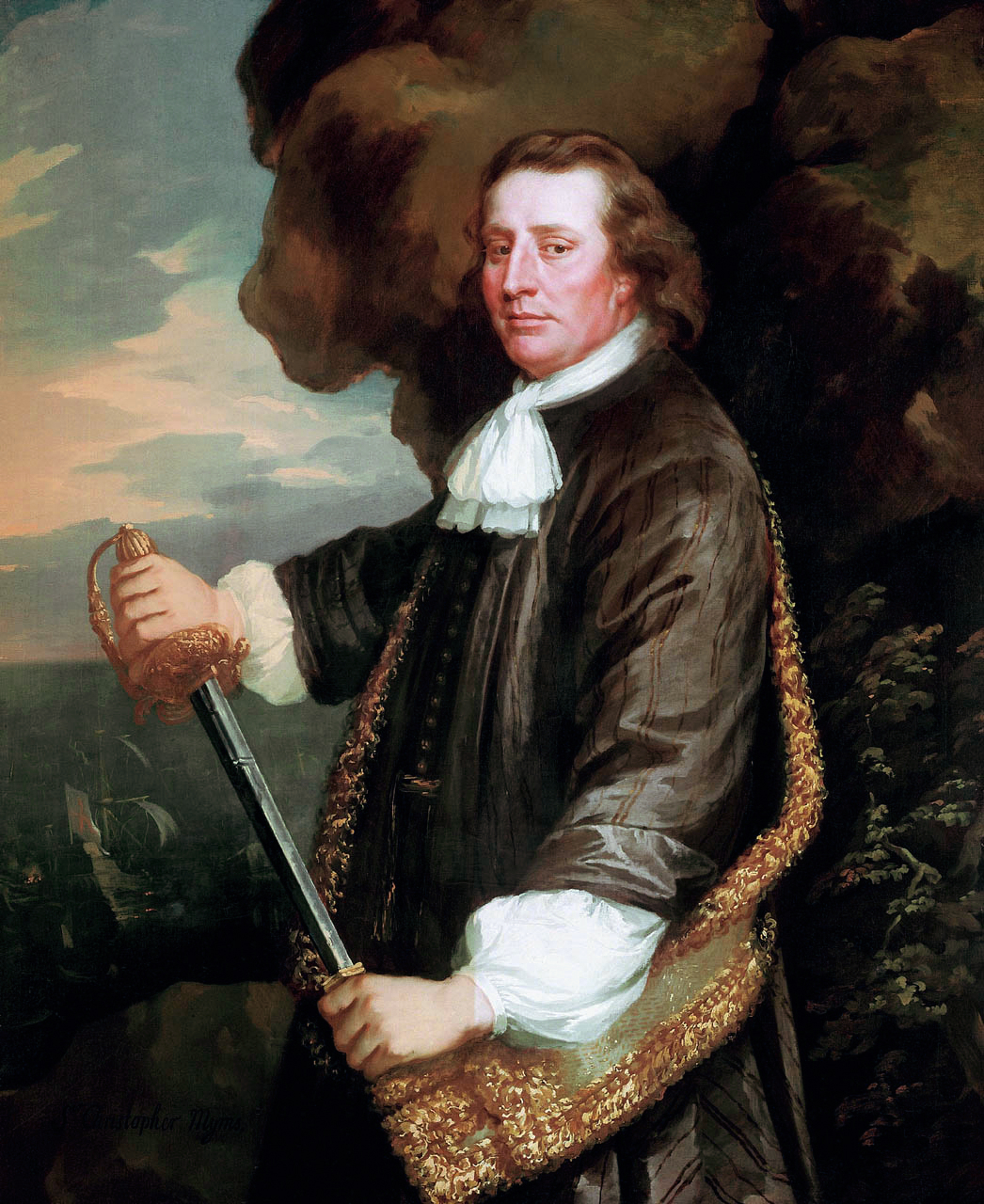
- Portrait by Sir Peter Lely, 1665–1666
- Born: 1625; Norfolk, England
- Died: 1666 (aged 40–41); London, England
- Military career
- Allegiance: England
- Branch: Royal Navy
- Rank: Vice admiral
- Commands: Elisabeth; Marston Moor; Jamaica Station
- Conflicts: First Anglo-Dutch War; Anglo-Spanish War; Second Anglo-Dutch War

Vice-Admiral Sir Christopher Myngs (sometimes spelled Mings; 1625–1666) was an English naval officer and privateer, most notably in the Colony of Jamaica.

== Life ==
The date of Myngs's birth is uncertain, but is probably somewhere between 1620 and 1625. He came from a Norfolk family and was a relative of Admiral Sir Cloudesley Shovell. Samuel Pepys' story of Myngs' humble birth ("his father being always and at this day a shoemaker, and his mother a Hoyman’s daughter; of which he was used frequently to boast") has now been evaluated by historians as being mostly fictitious in nature.

It is probable that he saw a good deal of sea-service before 1648. He first appears prominently as the captain of the Elisabeth, which after it had undergone action during the First Anglo-Dutch War brought in a Dutch convoy with two men-of-war as prizes. From 1653 to 1655 he continued to command the Elisabeth, when he was high in favour with the council of state and recommended for promotion by the flag officers under whom he served.

In 1655, he was appointed to the frigate Marston Moor, the crew of which was on the verge of mutiny. His firm measures quelled their insubordinate spirits, and he took the vessel out to the West Indies, arriving in January 1656 in Jamaica where he became the subcommander of the naval flotilla on the Jamaica Station, until the summer of 1657.

In February 1658, he returned to Jamaica as naval commander, acting as a commerce raider during the Anglo-Spanish War (1654–1660). During this period Myngs acquired a reputation for unnecessary cruelty, sacking several Spanish colonial towns while in command of whole fleets of buccaneers. In 1658, after beating off a Spanish naval attack, he raided Spanish colonies around the coast of South America; failing to capture a treasure fleet, he destroyed the colonial settlements in Tolú and Santa Marta in New Grenada instead; in 1659 he plundered Cumaná, Puerto Cabello and Coro (all in present-day Venezuela) where a large haul of silver in twenty chests were seized.

The Spanish government, upon hearing of Myngs' actions, protested to no avail to the English government of Oliver Cromwell on his conduct. Because he had shared half of the bounty of his 1659 raid, about a quarter of a million pounds, with the buccaneers against the explicit orders of Edward D'Oyley, the English Commander of Jamaica, he was arrested for embezzlement and sent back to England in the Marston Moor in 1660.

The Restoration government retained him in his command however, and in August 1662 he was sent to Jamaica commanding the Centurion in order to resume his activities as commander of the Jamaica Station, despite the fact that the war with Spain had ended. This was part of a covert English policy to undermine the Spanish dominion of the area. In 1662 Myngs decided that the best way to accomplish this was to employ the full potential of the buccaneers by promising them the opportunity for unbridled plunder. He had the complete support of the new governor, Lord Windsor, who fired a large contingent of soldiers to fill Myngs's ranks with disgruntled men. That year he attacked Santiago de Cuba in Spanish Cuba and took and sacked the town despite its strong defences. In 1663 buccaneers from all over the Caribbean joined him for the announced next expedition. Myngs directed the largest buccaneer fleet as yet assembled, 14 ships strong and with 1,400 buccaneers aboard, among them the privateers Henry Morgan and Abraham Blauvelt, where they went on to sack Campeche in February.

During the attack on Campeche Bay, Myngs himself had been severely wounded leaving Edward Mansvelt in charge of his pirate army. In 1664 he returned to England to recover. Later the next year he was made Vice-Admiral in Prince Rupert's squadron. As Vice-Admiral of the White under the Lord High Admiral James Stuart, Duke of York and Albany, he flew his flag during the Second Anglo-Dutch War at the Battle of Lowestoft in 1665, and for his reward, he received the honour of knighthood.

In the same year he then served under Edward Montagu, 1st Earl of Sandwich, as Vice-Admiral of the Blue and after the disgrace of Montagu, he served under the next supreme fleet commander, George Monck, 1st Duke of Albemarle. He was on detachment with Prince Rupert's Green squadron, when on 11 June 1666 the great Four Days' Battle began, but returned to the main fleet in time to take part on the final day, and in this action when his flotilla was surrounded by that of Vice-Admiral Johan de Liefde he received wounds – being hit first through the cheek and then in the left shoulder by musket balls fired by a sharpshooter when his Victory was challenged by De Liefde's flagship, the Ridderschap van Holland – of which he died shortly after returning to London.
