= David Williams (historian) =

Welsh historian

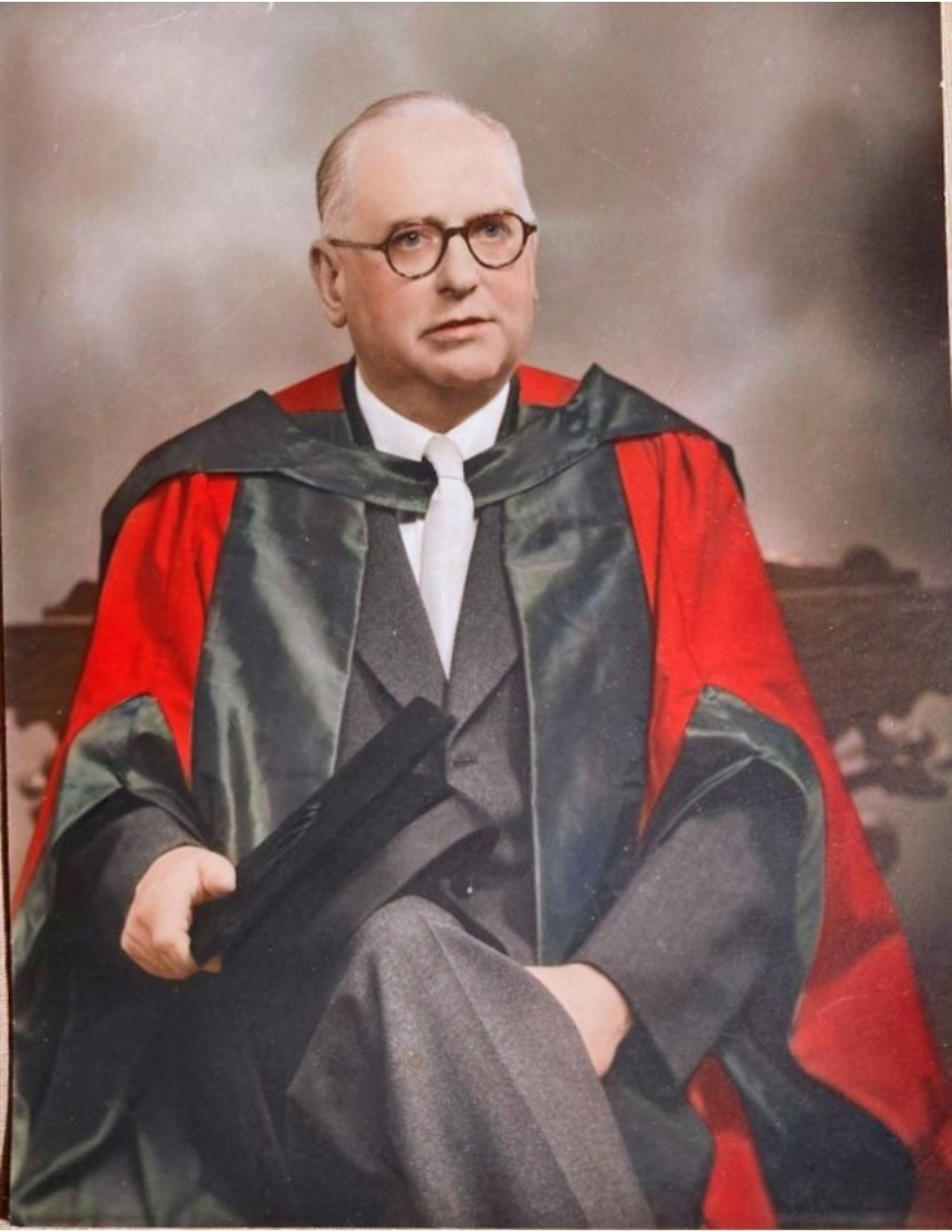
David Williams

David Williams (9 February 1900 – 1978) was a Welsh historian.

Williams was born at Llan-y-Cefn, Pembrokeshire.

From 1945 until his retirement in 1967, Williams was Professor of Welsh History in the University of Wales. He is best known for his classic History of Modern Wales.

== Works ==
- History of Modern Wales (1950)
- The Rebecca Riots (1955)
