= Abraham Blauvelt =

17th-century Dutch Sephardi Jewish privateer

Abraham Blauvelt was a Dutch privateer, pirate and explorer of Central America in the 1630s, after whom both the Bluefields River and the neighbouring town of Bluefields in Mosquitia were named.

One of the last of the Dutch corsairs of the mid-17th century, Abraham Blauvelt was first recorded exploring the Mosquito Coast in service of the Dutch West India Company. He later traveled to England in an effort to gain support to establish a colony in Mosquitia, where the city of Bluefields now stands. Around 1640 Blauvelt became a privateer serving the Swedish East India Company and from 1644 he commanded his own ship, successfully raiding Spanish shipping from a base in southwest Jamaica, today known as Bluefields, Jamaica, and selling the cargo and prizes to the Dutch colony of New Amsterdam (New York).

After peace between Spain and the Netherlands was reached with the signing of the Peace of Westphalia in 1648, Blauvelt, unable to stay in New Amsterdam, instead sailed to Newport, Rhode Island in early 1649 to sell his remaining cargo. However, the colonial governor seized one of Blauvelt's prizes and with his crew arguing over their shares, the local colonists, fearing that Rhode Island would acquire a reputation for trading with pirates, forced Blauvelt to leave the colony. For the next several years Blauvelt commanded a French ship called La Garse, later living among the natives of Cape Gracias a Dios in Mosquitia, until the early 1660s when he was recruited for Christopher Myngs' sacking of the Spanish colony of Campeche in 1663. However, nothing more is known about his activities after this time.
