= Jon Latimer =

British military historian

Jonathan David Latimer (1964 – 4 January 2009) was a historian and writer based in Wales. His books include Operation Compass 1940 (Osprey, 2000), Tobruk 1941 (Osprey, 2001), Deception in War (John Murray, 2001), Alamein (John Murray, 2002), Burma: The Forgotten War (John Murray, 2004) and 1812: War with America (Harvard University Press, 2007) which won a Distinguished Book Award from the Society for Military History and was shortlisted for the George Washington Book Prize.

== Life ==
Born in Prestatyn, Wales, Latimer was educated at Christleton County High School, Chester. He studied for a geography degree at University College, Swansea but switched course to graduate in oceanography. He worked as an oceanographer until becoming a full-time writer in 1997.

In 2003, he became an honorary research fellow at his alma mater (by this time Swansea University) and was appointed as a part-time lecturer in history on the BA (Hons) degree scheme 'War and Society'. He was also a guest lecturer at the Joint Services Command and Staff College at Shrivenham.

Latimer was an enthusiastic part-time soldier. Originally enlisting as a sapper in the Royal Monmouthshire (Militia), he was commissioned in 1986 into the 3rd Battalion Royal Welch Fusiliers, Territorial Army. He spent periods attached to regular battalions in Northern Ireland (1989), Australia (1991–2) and as an intelligence officer (1992–3).

Latimer died following a heart attack in January 2009. His book, Buccaneers of the Caribbean: How Piracy Forged an Empire was published posthumously in April 2009.

== Selected works ==
- Operation Compass 1940: Wavell's Whirlwind Offensive. Oxford: Osprey Military, 2000. ISBN 1855329670
- Deception in War. Woodstock, NY: Overlook Press, 2001. ISBN 1585672041
- Alamein. Cambridge, Massachusetts: Harvard University Press, 2002. ISBN 0674010167
- Burma: The Forgotten War. London: John Murray, 2004. ISBN 0719565758
- Tobruk 1941: Rommel's Opening Move. Westport, CT: Praeger, 2004. ISBN 0275982874 (Originally published by Osprey in 2001)
- 1812: War with America. Cambridge, Massachusetts: Belknap Press of Harvard University Press, 2007. ISBN 9780674025844
- Buccaneers of the Caribbean: How Piracy Forged an Empire. Cambridge, Massachusetts: Harvard University Press, 2009. ISBN 9780674034037
