= Governor Willoughby =

Governor Willoughby may refer to:

- Henry Willoughby (governor) (1640–1669), Governor of Barbados from 1664 to 1666 and Governor of Antigua from 1667 to 1670
- Francis Willoughby, 5th Baron Willoughby of Parham (1605–1666), Governor of Barbados from 1650 to 1651
- William Willoughby, 6th Baron Willoughby of Parham (1610s–1673), Governor of Barbados from 1667 to 1673
