= Henry Morgan's raid on Porto Bello =

1668 raid

- Part of the Anglo-Spanish War (1654–1671)
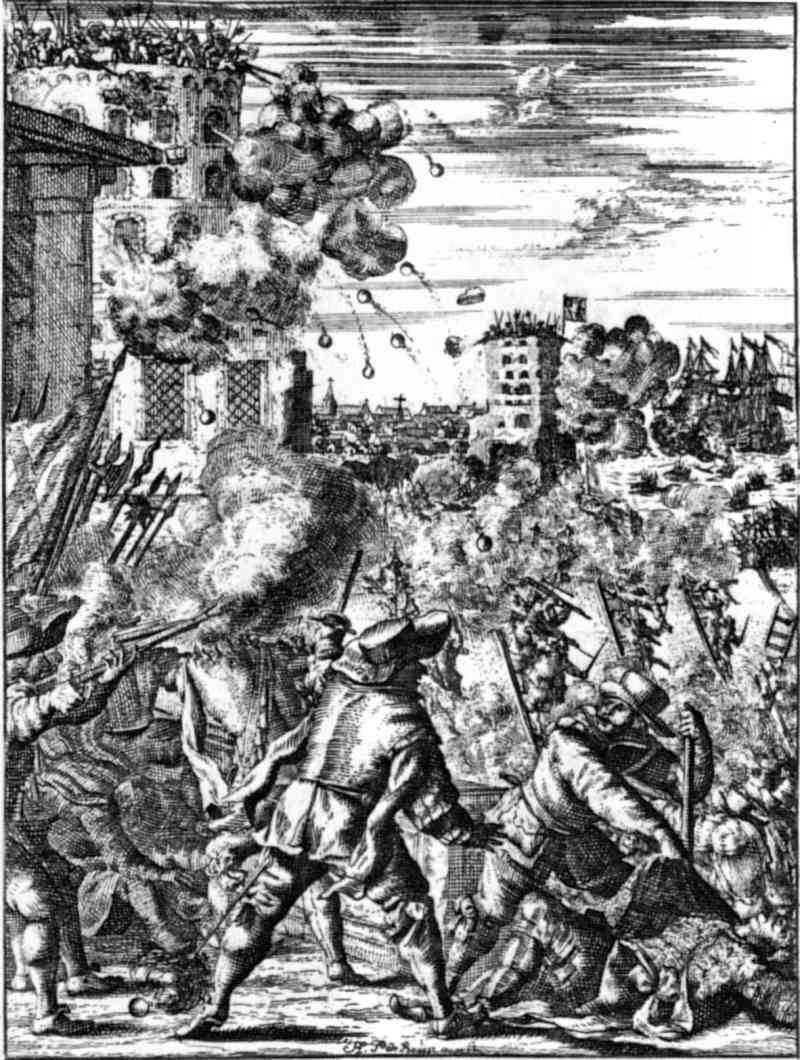
- Henry Morgan's attack on the Castillo de San Jeronimo, Porto Bello, 1668
Date	10 July – 2 August, 1668
Location	Porto Bello, Real Audiencia of Panama 09°33′16″N 79°39′18″W
Result	English victory

Belligerents
Spain	England

Commanders and leaders
(Spain) Agustín de Bracamonte	(Kingdom of England) Henry Morgan

Strength
1,100 soldiers and militia	8 ships 500 men

Casualties and losses
~300 killed, wounded or captured unknown to disease	18 killed 32 wounded unknown to disease

Henry Morgan's raid on Porto Bello was a military event which took place in the latter half of the Anglo-Spanish war beginning on 10 July 1668. Welsh buccaneer Henry Morgan led a largely English privateer force against the heavily fortified Spanish controlled town of Porto Bello (now Portobelo in modern Panama). After landing, Morgan and his men attempted to take the castles protecting the town. One such attempt involved using captured citizens as human shields to seize one of the castles. After capturing them all by force the privateers subsequently entered the city and then plundered it before Morgan demanded a large ransom from the Governor of Panama Don Agustín de Bracamonte. While the negotiations for this was going on, Bracamonte led a sizeable force from Panama City intent on recapturing the city and putting the privateers to the sword.

Morgan however managed to ambush and repel Bracamonte's counter attack forcing him to deliver the ransom. Having achieved this, Morgan and the privateers left Porto Bello intact as promised and returned to Jamaica unhindered. The attack was highly successful and garnered some 100,000 pieces of eight as well as other valuable booty.

== Background ==
England and Spain had remained in a state of war in the Caribbean following the Restoration of Charles II in 1660. England's taking possession of Jamaica since 1657 had yet to be confirmed by Spain in a treaty. As a result buccaneers were invited to base themselves at Port Royal to help defend against Spanish attacks.

Henry Morgan, who had been in charge of the Port Royal militia and the defence of Jamaica, took over further privateering expeditions as Admiral in Chief of the Confederacy of Buccaneers.

In March 1668 Morgan set out on his first commanded expedition to the Spanish island of Cuba to seize Puerto Principe. Outside the town the privateers defeated the militia in a pitched battle known as the Battle of la Savana. They then captured the town, plundering and sacking it while also gathering a ransom for citizens it seized. The President of the Real Audiencia of Panama, Don Juan Perez de Guzmán, then launched a retaliatory attack on Providence Island, capturing it and sending the prisoners to Porto Bello. Despite this Guzmán had fallen afoul of the new Viceroy of Peru and was now imprisoned and replaced by the young Don Agustín de Bracamonte.

After dividing the spoils of the conquest of Puerto del Príncipe, Morgan announced a plan to attack Porto Bello in the Spanish Viceroyalty of Peru. The city was the third largest and strongest on the Spanish Main as it was one of the main routes of high value goods between the Spanish territories and Spain. Silver and other treasures would be sent from Peru to Panama City. Then it was carried by mules overland to Porto Bello, where it was loaded onto the Spanish Plate fleet. Porto Bello was protected by two castles in the harbour and another under construction in the town. The port had been attacked by English privateers before; Francis Drake had been repelled in 1595 and then died of disease not far off the coast, and William Parker six years later captured and ransomed the place.

The 200 French privateers, unhappy with the division of the treasure at Puerto Principe and the murder of their countryman, left Morgan's service and returned to Tortuga. On June 26 Morgan and his ships briefly landed at Port Royal before leaving for Porto Bello but only he and the captains (including Edward Collier) knew – the rest were not told of the destination until they landed.

== Raid ==
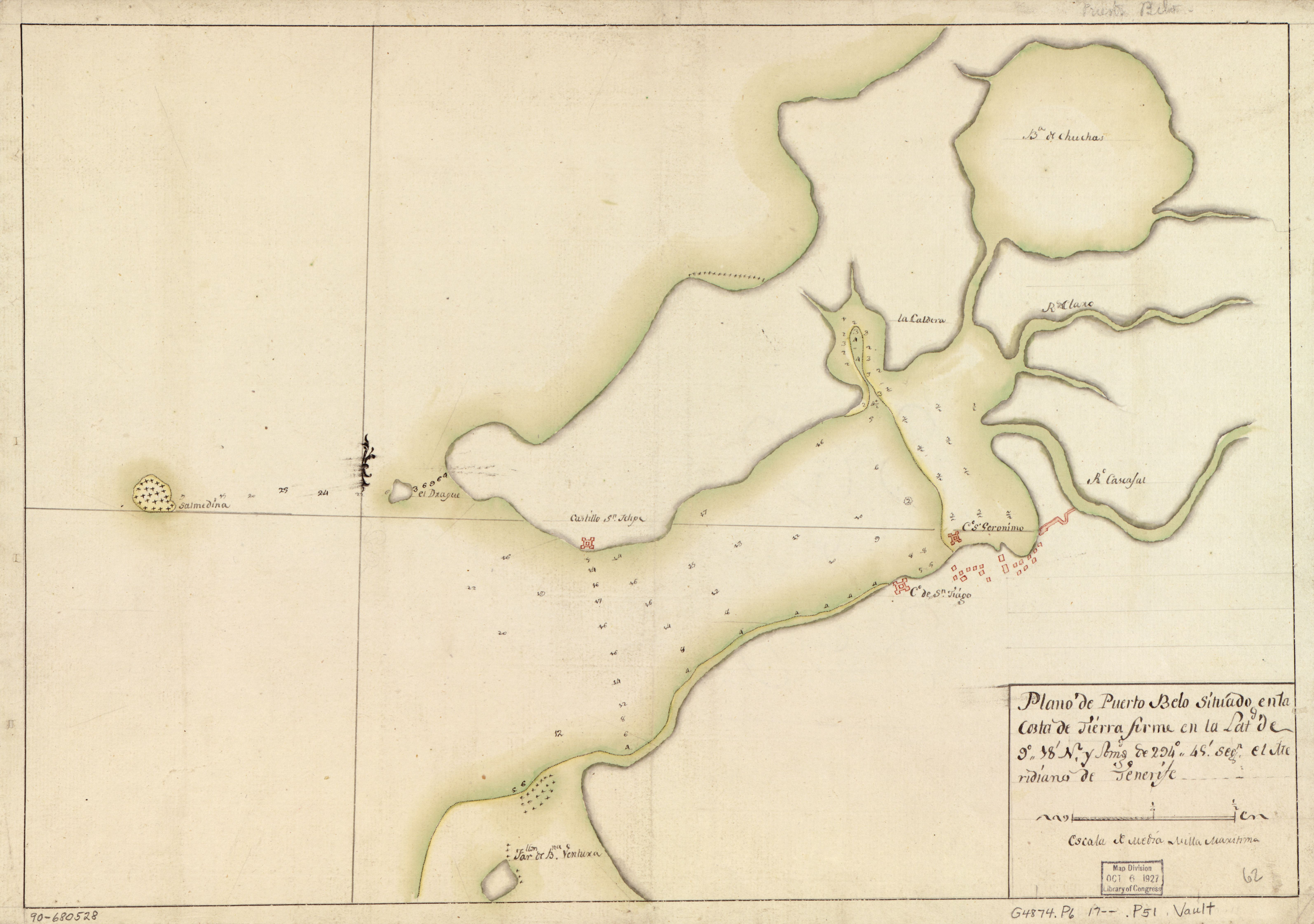
A map of Porto Bello from 1700 showing the location of the three castles as well as the town.

On 10 July Morgan weighed anchor with 470 men on his nine vessels at Naos, a village twelve miles from Porto Bello in the Bay of Bocas del Torro. From there he sailed along the coast to the port of El Puerto del Ponton, four miles from Porto Bello, and transferred his men to 23 canoes. While this was happening six emaciated English prisoners captured from Old Providence appeared who were able to guide them and also gave valuable information. From there they paddled to within three miles (4.8 km) of the target where the Privateers approached a blockhouse at La Rancherria – an old pearling station guarded by five men. They were asked to surrender by the English, but were met with a volley of fire which wounded two men. The English then assaulted the blockhouse putting all to the sword. Although the blockhouse was captured, the surprise had now been lost. The musket fire had been heard in the city and the mayor immediately called his men to arms.

=== Taking the castles ===
As dawn broke the following day Morgan now had to rush his men two miles across the beach towards Santiago Castle. The former prisoners guided them to Santiago from the landward side, where they arrived half an hour before dawn. Morgan suddenly saw how high the walls of the castle were and had second thoughts about making an assault. From the prisoners' information Morgan instead sent two groups – one to head into town to capture it and the other to approach a hill which would give a commanding view of the castle's rear gate.

The first detachment charged towards the castle – however the Spanish garrison had loaded the cannons with round shot and not grapeshot. The shots they fired were ineffective and the men were able to get under the guns at the bottom of the castle walls.

San Gerónimo and Porto bello

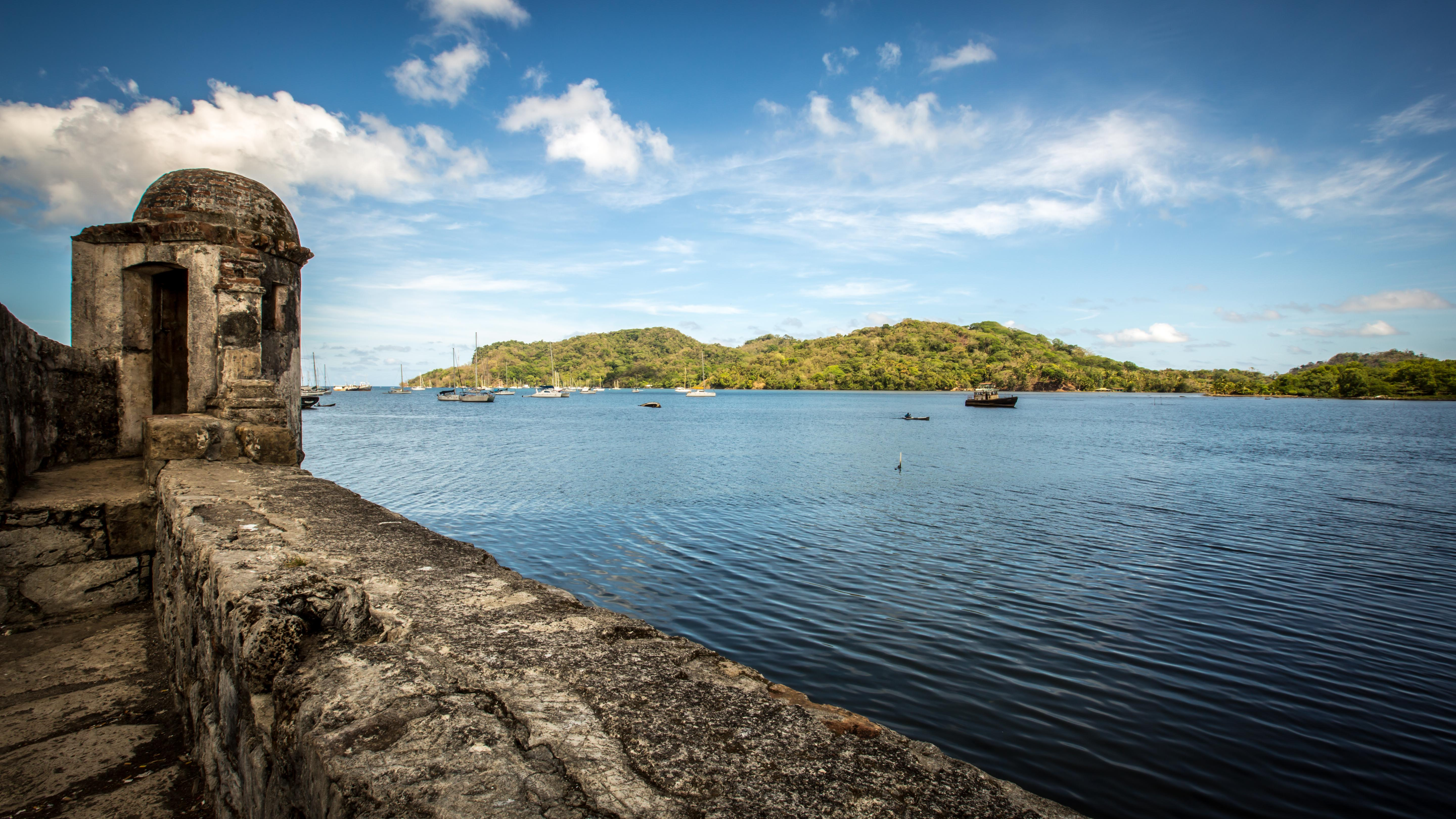
Present day view of San Gerónimo's battlements

The other group penetrated the town and shot at everything they saw to incite terror, taking prisoners and looting everything they could before the Spanish could hide their valuables.

The town was captured with ease and both groups now combined and headed towards the other unfinished fort San Geronimo that lay across the other side of the harbour. Realizing the water was shallow, Morgan's men then assaulted it with ease and the Spanish gunners surrendered. Morgan also released eleven badly treated chained up English prisoners captured during Guzman's attack on Old Providence. They had been working on the construction of the castle and the privateers were furious on seeing their condition and demanded revenge. One of the prisoners claimed that the Spanish were raising levies to attack Jamaica.

Santiago castle

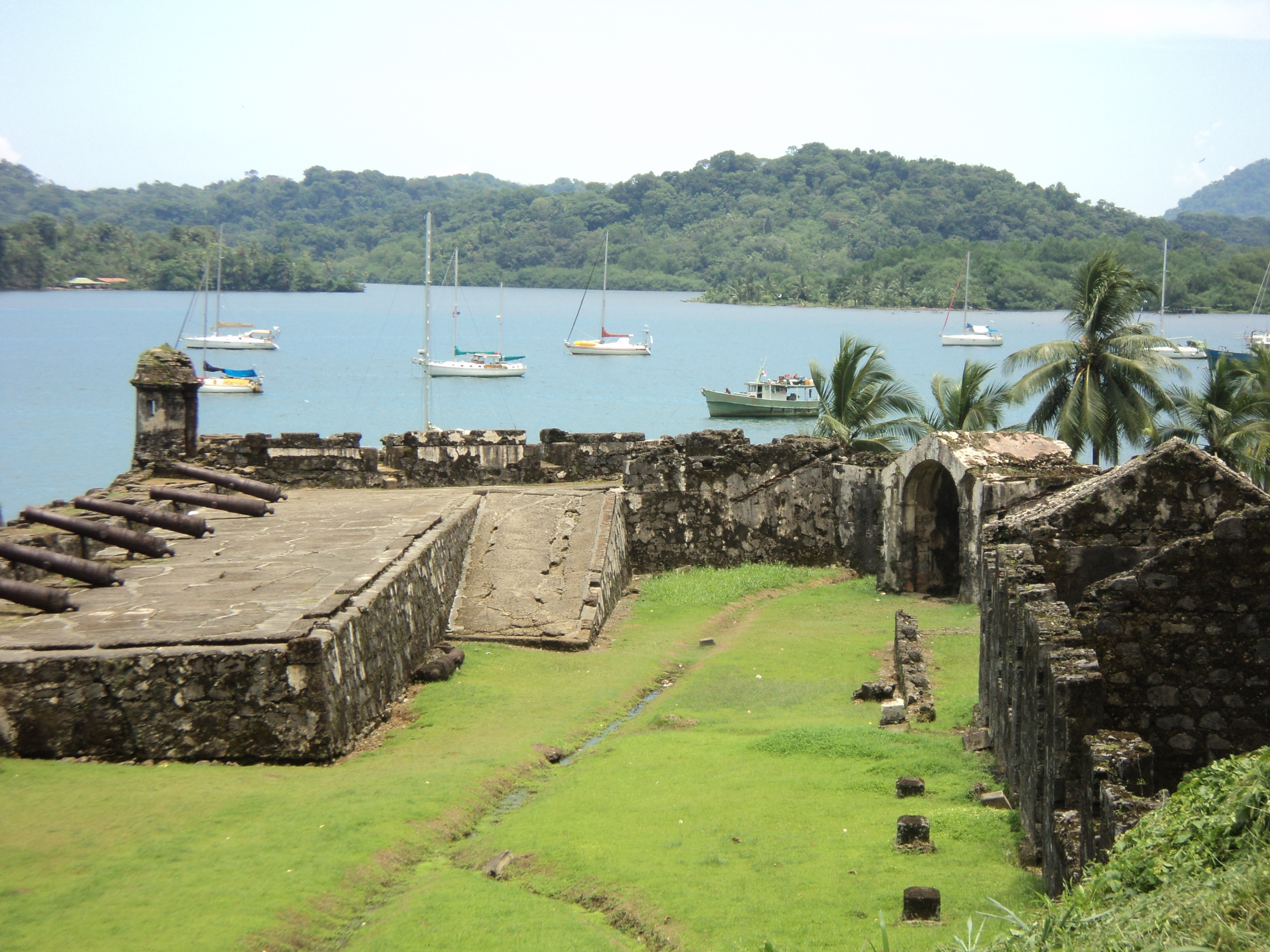
Present day view of Santiago fort and the bay

Meanwhile on the hill the musketeers were picking off men in Santiago castle. Morgan now had to take the castle quickly – he ordered a number of long ladders to be built, and came up with a controversial stratagem. He ordered Spanish prisoners to be placed in front of the assault force to be used as human shields.

Morgan had all the prisoners bound and locked in the Santa Maria church. He then chose a set number of prisoners – the town's mayor, friars and nuns and the sick and the elderly. They were marched towards the castle – and the Spanish realised what was happening. The privateers were crouched behind the prisoners who shouted at the castle not to shoot. As they got closer and closer to the main gates the castle's gunners reluctantly opened fire – despite the pleas of the prisoners. The guns firing chain shot wounded a number of the prisoners and an Englishman. Now close to the walls the English rushed through the prisoners and hacked away at the gate with axes. While this was going on, another force swept round the castle and with ladders managed to scale the wall. The Spanish defended with all kinds of weapons including stones and anything they could get their hands on.

The privateers managed to cut the defenders down using earthen pots filled with gunpowder, and swept over the ramparts. One Englishman managed to raise the red flag, meaning 'no quarter'. At the same time the main gate was breached and the privateers poured in. The Spanish were all put to the sword with seventy four dead including the commander. The English lost only an eighth of the attacking force.

San Felipe Castle

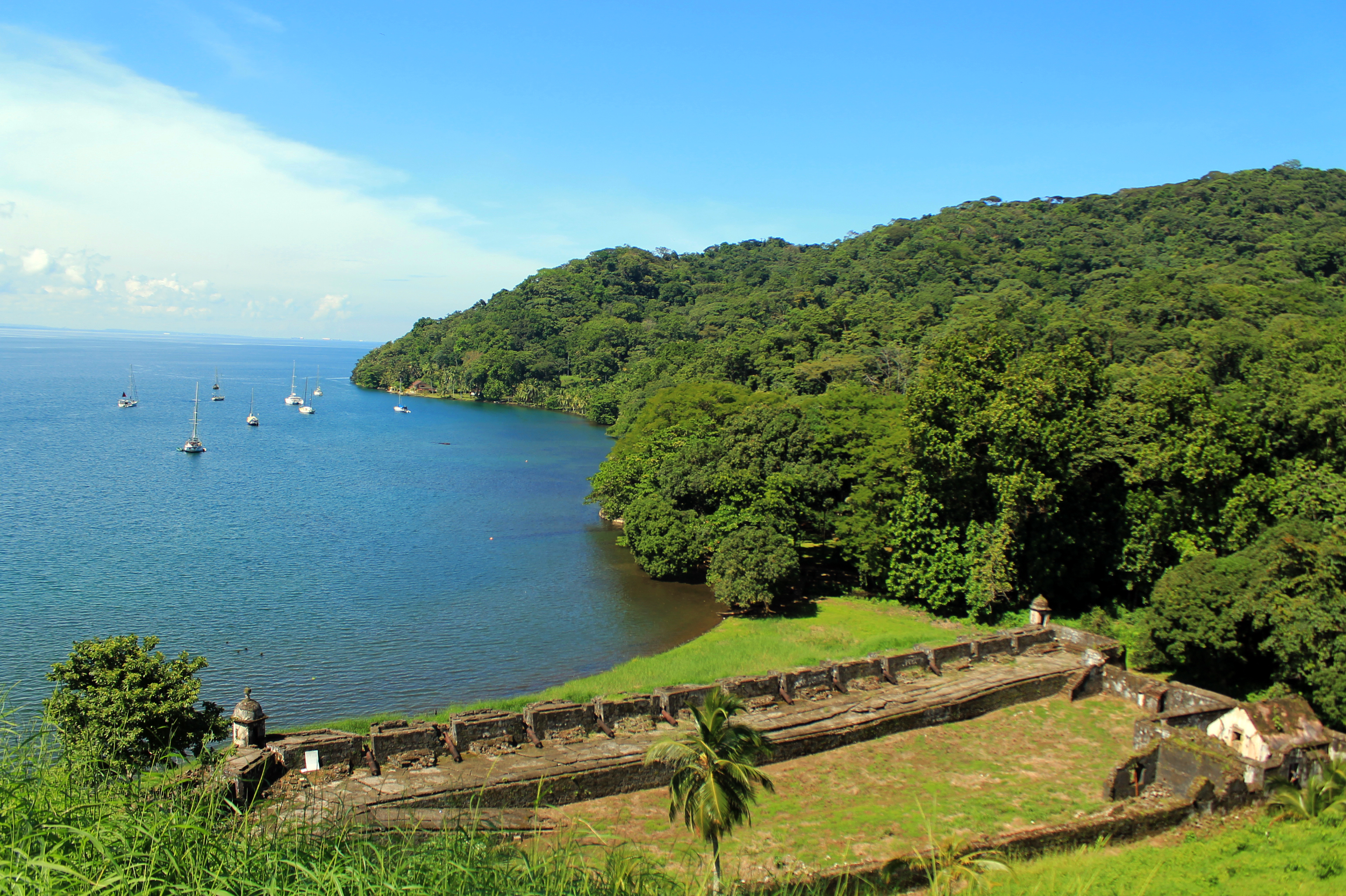
Present day view of San Felipe fortifications – the last to surrender.

With the capture of the two fortifications Morgan now only had San Felipe to capture. It stood in the way of the other side of the harbour and was held by fifty men with Castellan Alejandro Manuel Pau y Rocaberti. Morgan needed it taken quickly too so he could get his ships in to offload and on load supplies. He intended to take it peacefully but when two canoes were sent to ask for its surrender and were shot at, it was clear it had to be taken by force.

200 men in eleven canoes with two Spanish prisoners as guides at gunpoint went in to the attack. One group fired at the men in the castle in the fort and attempted to set fire to the gate. The other group attempted to charge the fort but this attempt was repelled with the loss of five casualties amongst the privateers. Nevertheless the castle was running short of powder and food, so surrender was inevitable. After a heated discussion the castle commander surrendered and Morgan agreed under generous terms and kept their swords but before Rocaberti came out of the fort, he was given a vial of poison and drank it.

=== Sack of Porto Bello ===
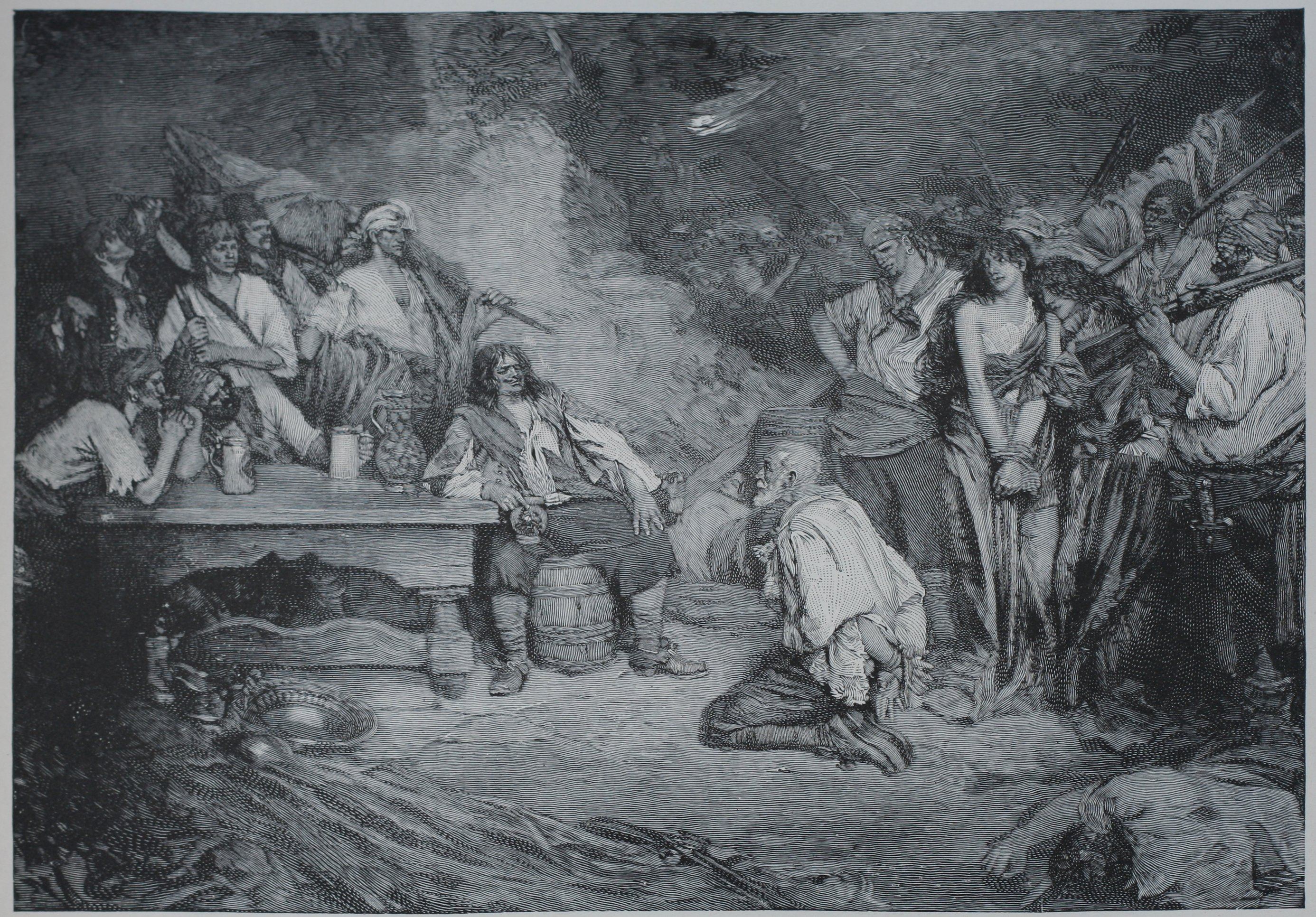
Morgan at Porto Bello with a prisoner: published in December 1888 from "Buccaneers and Marooners of the Spanish Main". Harper's Magazine and illustrated by Howard Pyle

Morgan ran up the English flag on all three forts. The Privateers then stripped the city of its wealth; torture was used on the residents to uncover hidden caches of money and jewels. Nevertheless there were no first-hand reports from witnesses that confirmed claims of widespread rape and debauchery. Morgan now set the task of interrogating all the Spanish prisoners for information and the whereabouts of any hidden valuables. Some had escaped into the hinterlands along with their possessions. More importantly, one of the prisoners under torture gave information regarding plans of an attack against Jamaica. This was what he needed; proof that the Spanish were planning an imminent and large attack. As such, this made the attack on Porto Bello justifiable in regards to his letter of marque.

The privateers went out in groups beyond the town to find any of the residents in hiding. After settling in for a week, Morgan then demanded 100,000 Pesos as a ransom for the town or he would burn it down. He sent two men to the President of Panama with these demands.

=== Spanish counter attack ===
At Panama City 70 miles from Porto Bello, news of the latter's fall had been given by a Spanish horseman who had escaped and managed to trek all the way. On July 14 Governor Don Agustín de Bracamonte quickly set out with some 800 soldiers, militia and natives to try and retake the city. As such he made the mistake of not having enough necessary provisions to keep them sustained – instead provisions were to be sent later while they were on the march. Bracamonte also sent out hurried appeals to Cartagena and Lima to send out an expedition to pursue and put all the English pirates to the sword.

Meanwhile in Porto Bello natives from the region who were never friends of Spain soon had friendly relations with the English. This was fortunate for Morgan as they gave him news and updates of Bracamonte's Spanish army column which had been approaching over the mountains and through the jungles towards Porto Bello.

On hearing of the Spanish approach Morgan wrote to the Bracamonte the acting president of Panama, demanding a ransom for the city of 350,000 pesos. (Note: The full name of the peso was the peso de ocho reales, also known as piece of eight or the Spanish dollar, the main currency used by the Spanish; English merchants and government used pounds, shillings and pence. In the late 17th century the peso was worth between five and six shillings.) The two men that Morgan sent finally reached Bracamonte's force and gave them the accounts of Morgan's actions in Porto Bello.

Bracamonte wrote back and accused Morgan of being a pirate; he refused any concessions and warned his troops they would spare no 'pirate' alive. Morgan angry at being called a pirate, threatened to torch the city, demolish the castles and treat the prisoners in the same manner as the English prisoners had been treated by the Spanish.

Morgan acted quickly by setting up defences around the town towards where the Spanish would approach. Having done this he then sent 200 men down the only passable road to a narrow pass to set up an ambush. The Spanish already bogged down by lack of supplies and growing disease were approaching the town from the South. As they approached the English launched the ambush towards the leading elements, sending many retreating in panic. The ambush was a huge success with the Spanish losing eight men to one Englishmen. Bracamonte not to be deterred ordered his men on, but ordered a halt when his scouts reported the strong defences that lay before him.

Bracamonte, despite this setback, ordered an attack as a soon as possible. However, only a series of small weak attacks were made and all were easily repelled by the privateers. Another attempt was made to rescue some certain prisoners and valuables, as well as the statues of the Virgin which Bracamonte assumed would be desecrated by the English. This also failed.

=== Negotiations and ransom ===
Bracamonte backed off, and now with news of delays of provisions and his force already weakened by disease, decided to change his tone. The Spanish were also concerned that the French were about to join the English privateers and reinforce them and there were even rumours of an impending attack on Panama itself. Bracamonte formed a junta and after some discussions reluctantly agreed to offer a reduced ransom. After some more exchange of letters over a week between himself and Morgan a deal was finally struck for 100,000 pesos.

The ransom was brought by mules on 1 August: 27 ingot bars of silver, as well as gold and silver coins: 100,000 pesos (£25,000) in total. Morgan was satisfied; this in addition to the rest of the booty which also included powder, guns and arms. The brass guns, some 57 in total from all the castles were collected and loaded aboard the ships. The loot was vast – as well as the ransom money, the Privateers had a huge haul of silk, linens, cloth, slaves and any gold and silver taken from the town and residents.

Morgan and his men had remained in Porto Bello for nearly a month and kept his promise. On 2 August he loaded the treasure in addition to what had been found in the city, freed the prisoners and set sail, leaving the city and forts intact but without any weapons. All returned to Jamaica by the middle of August, except for Edward Collier who, having landed near Santa Marta Bay for provisions, ended up capturing one of the Governor's kinsman who under interrogation gave some indication of the Spanish plans against Jamaica.

== Aftermath ==
Following the ransom and the plunder of the city, Morgan returned to Port Royal to a hero's welcome. Morgan's losses were no more than 18 killed and 32 wounded, although a small number had been suffering from disease. The ransom and plunder was counted – between 250,000 Pesos or between £70,000 and £100,000. The figures were more than the annual agricultural output of Jamaica, and nearly half of Barbados's sugar exports. Each privateer received £120 – equivalent to five or six times the average annual earnings of a sailor of the time. Morgan received a five per cent share for his work, while Governor of Jamaica Modyford received a ten per cent share, which was the price of Morgan's letter of marque. Morgan now had become a legend and more and more men wanted to serve under him.

The Spanish eventually sent expeditions from Cartagena and Lima but only arrived several weeks after Morgan and his men had left. They helped Bracamonte re-establish the city. The raid was a big blow to Spanish pride – back in Spain news of the assault was met with fury and bitterness. The raid also exposed the weaknesses of the empire – Spain was going through a financial crisis which was affecting the crown. An English diplomat in Madrid received angry demands about the raid not just from Spanish ministers but also from the public. As Morgan had overstepped the limits of his commission, Modyford reported back to London that he had "reproved" him for his actions although in Britain the Porto Bello raid was celebrated as a great victory, and Morgan was widely viewed as a national hero. Neither he nor Modyford were rebuked for their actions. Historians have considered Morgan's action at Porto Bello as a display of "clever cunning and expert timing which marked his brilliance as a military commander.

Morgan did not stop there – in retaliation to Spain's privateering against English shipping in the Caribbean, he launched a wave of further attacks. Morgan set forth the following year to strike at Spanish settlements in Lake Maracaibo. After this attack, he then defeated the Spanish Armada de Barlovento set to trap him before heading back to Jamaica with few losses and again a significant amount of plunder.

Queen Mariana ordered privateers to raid English shipping in a retaliatory response. Fearing for the security of the island Modyford again commissioned Morgan to act against the Spanish. In December 1670 Morgan set out with his largest expedition, to Panama completely unaware of a Peace treaty signed between England and Spain. Morgan's men marched across the Isthmus of Panama and ravaged Panama city.

=== Libel actions ===
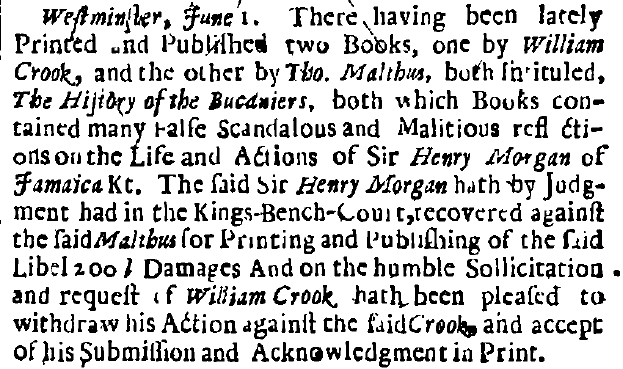
News report from The London Gazette regarding the libel action taken by Sir Henry Morgan inn 1685

When Exquemelin's biography of Morgan was published in England and translated, it soon became controversial, in particular the passage about the use of nuns and monks as a human shield. Morgan was furious and then sued for libel and won. As a result subsequent publications of the biography in England were retracted.

== See also ==
- Blockade of Porto Bello
- Battle of Porto Bello (1739)
