= Sir James Modyford, 1st Baronet =

Merchant and colonial agent in Jamaica

Sir James Modyford 1st Baronet
- Arms of the Modyford baronets of London (1661)

Deputy-governor of Jamaica
- In office 1667–1671

Personal details
- Born: 1618
- Died: 1673 (aged 54–55)
- Spouse: Elizabeth Stanning (m.)
- Children: 3 (1 son, 2 daughters)

Sir James Modyford, 1st Baronet (1618–1673) was an English merchant, colonial agent, and deputy-governor of Jamaica.

== Life ==
James Modyford, younger brother of Sir Thomas Modyford, was, as a youth, at Constantinople in the service of the Turkey Company. (Note: Calendar of State Papers, Domestic, 30 June 1666.) Afterwards he appears to have been settled at Chelsea as a merchant, and under the Commonwealth was employed in Ireland, presumably through the interest of his cousin George Monck, 1st Duke of Albemarle. On 18 October 1660 he was appointed "clerk of the first-fruits in Ireland", was knighted about the same time, and on 18 February 1660–1 was created a baronet in consideration of his having "liberally and generously provided and sustained thirty men for three years for the care and defence of Ireland". (Note: Patent roll, 13 Car. II, pt. i. No. 2.) In 1663 he was named as one of the Royal African Company. (Note: 10 January; Calendar of State Papers, America and West Indies, p. 121.) In that year he was in Jamaica, and sent home a survey and description of the island. (Note: Calendar of State Papers, America and West Indies, p. 177.) In 1664, on the appointment of his brother as governor of Jamaica, he returned to England, and for the next two or three years was employed as agent for the colony. (Note: Calendar of State Papers, America and West Indies, 13 October, 29 November 1664, 20 February 1665, 1 March, 21 August 1666, fee.) On 30 June 1666 he was recommended by the Duke of Albemarle for the embassy at Constantinople, as one "who was bred up in the country, knows the language, and was formerly desired by the Turkey Company for the employment". (Note: Calendar of State Papers, Domestic.) The recommendation was unsuccessful, and on 10 November following he was appointed lieutenant-governor of the island of Providence, or Santa Catalina, then newly recovered by a party of buccaneers. (Note: Calendar of State Papers, America and West Indies; cf. Sir Henry Morgan.) Having been detained for eleven weeks at Barbados, "through the ignorance rather than the malice of Lord Willoughby", he did not reach Jamaica till 15 July 1667, when he found that Santa Catalina had been recaptured by the Spaniards. (Note: Calendar of State Papers, America and West Indies, 29, 30 July, 3 August.) He was then appointed by his brother lieutenant-general, deputy-governor, and chief judge of the admiralty court at Jamaica. His commissions appear to have lapsed with the supersession of Sir Thomas in June 1671, but he remained at Jamaica about his private business, and died there in January 1672–3. (Note: Addit. MS. 27968, f. 30.)

=== Family ===
Modyford married Elizabeth, daughter and heiress of Sir Nicholas Stanning of Maristow, Devonshire, and by her had issue a son, Thomas, who succeeded to the baronetcy, but died a minor in 1678, when the title became extinct. He left also two daughters, Grace and Mary. Elizabeth, Lady Modyford, died 30 March 1724 at the age of ninety-four, and was buried in the church of Bickleigh, Devonshire.

== Sources ==
- Calendars of State Papers, Domestic and Colonial;
- Burke's Extinct Baronetcies;
- Chester's Westminster Registers, p. 194;
- Marshall's Genealogist, v. 149.

== See also ==
- Modyford baronets

== Bibliography ==
- Laughton, John Knox (1894). "Modyford, James" . In Lee, Sidney (ed.). Dictionary of National Biography. Vol. 38. London: Smith, Elder & Co. pp. 93–94.
- Laughton, J. K.; Zahedieh, Nuala (2004). "Modyford, Sir James, baronet". In Oxford Dictionary of Biography. Oxford: Oxford University Press. n.p.
- "Sir James Modyford". Centre for the Study of the Legacies of British Slavery. UCL Department of History. © 2022. Accessed 19 February 2022.
