= Henry Morgan's raid on Lake Maracaibo =

Military event in 1669 in Venezuela

- Part of the Anglo-Spanish War (1654–1671)
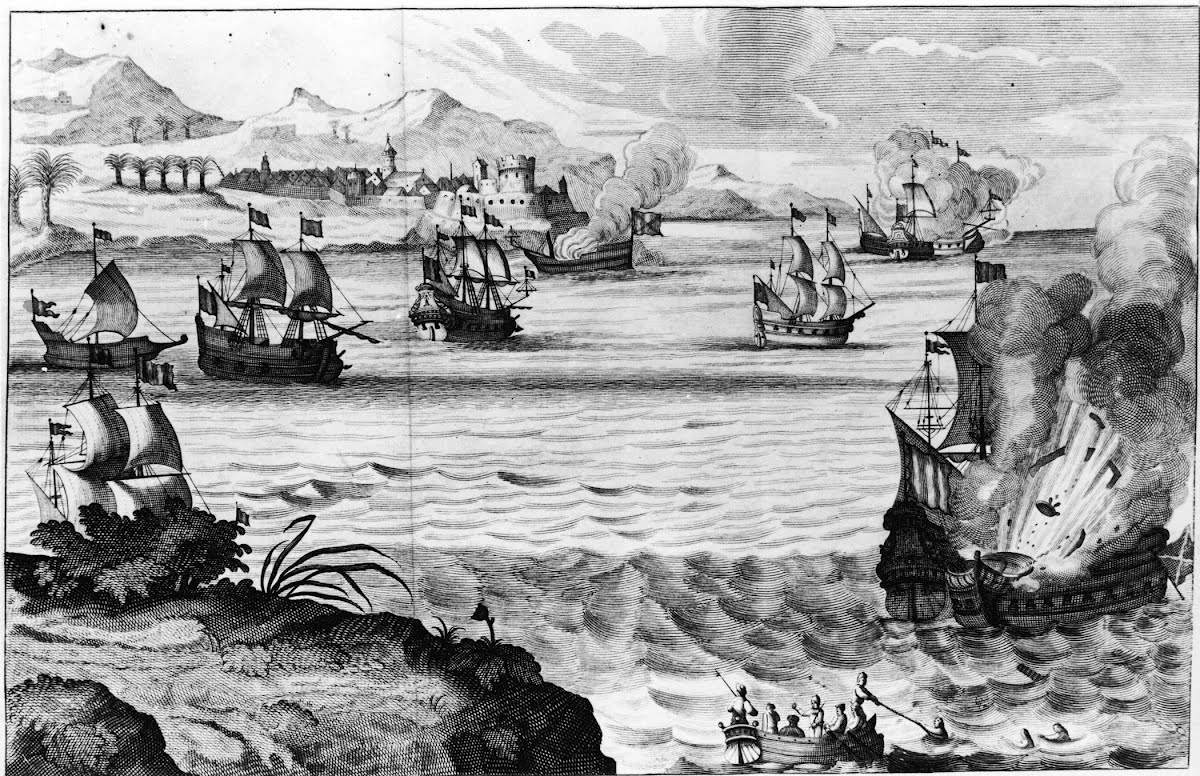
- Henry Morgan defeats the Spanish fleet on Lake Maracaibo 1669. From Alexandre Exquemelin's The Buccaneers of America
Date	16 March – 21 May 1669
Location	Lake Maracaibo 09°48′57″N 71°33′24″W
Result	English victory

Belligerents
Spain	England

Commanders and leaders
(Spain) Alonso del Campo y Espinosa	(Kingdom of England) Henry Morgan

Strength
Armada de Barlovento: 1 Galleon, 1 Patache and 1 Frigate; Various coastal defences	8 ships 500 men

Casualties and losses
400 killed, wounded or captured 1 galleon sunk 1 patache captured 1 frigate burned while aground 10 merchant vessels captured 2 towns plundered Losses totalling £30,000	Unknown

Henry Morgan's raid on Lake Maracaibo, also known as the Sack of Maracaibo and the Battle of Lake Maracaibo, was a military event that took place between 16 March and 21 May 1669 during the latter stage of the Anglo-Spanish War. English privateers commanded by notable Buccaneer Henry Morgan launched an attack with the purpose of raiding Spanish towns along the coastline inside of Lake Maracaibo in the Spanish Province of Venezuela.

After capturing and sacking the towns of Maracaibo and Gibraltar, Morgan was trapped by the Spanish Armada de Barlovento led by Don Alonso del Campo y Espinosa. Despite being outgunned, Morgan's fleet defeated and wiped out the Spanish fleet in a pitched naval battle on the bar of Maracaibo. Following this, Morgan was able to escape getting past the fortress guarding the lake after successful ruse. His fleet returned to Jamaica unscathed with a significant amount of plunder.

== Background ==
England and Spain had remained in a state of war in the Caribbean following the Restoration of Charles II in 1660. England's taking possession of Jamaica since 1657 had yet to be confirmed by Spain in a treaty. As a result, Buccaneers were invited, to base themselves at Port Royal, to help defend against Spanish attacks.

Henry Morgan, who had been in charge of the Port Royal militia and the defence of Jamaica, took over further privateering expeditions as Admiral in Chief of the Confederacy of Buccaneers. Thomas Modyford the Governor of Jamaica gave Morgan a letter of marque. who then conducted a raid on Puerto Principe which yielded a satisfactory profit. Another larger raid took place on Porto Bello which was even more successful.

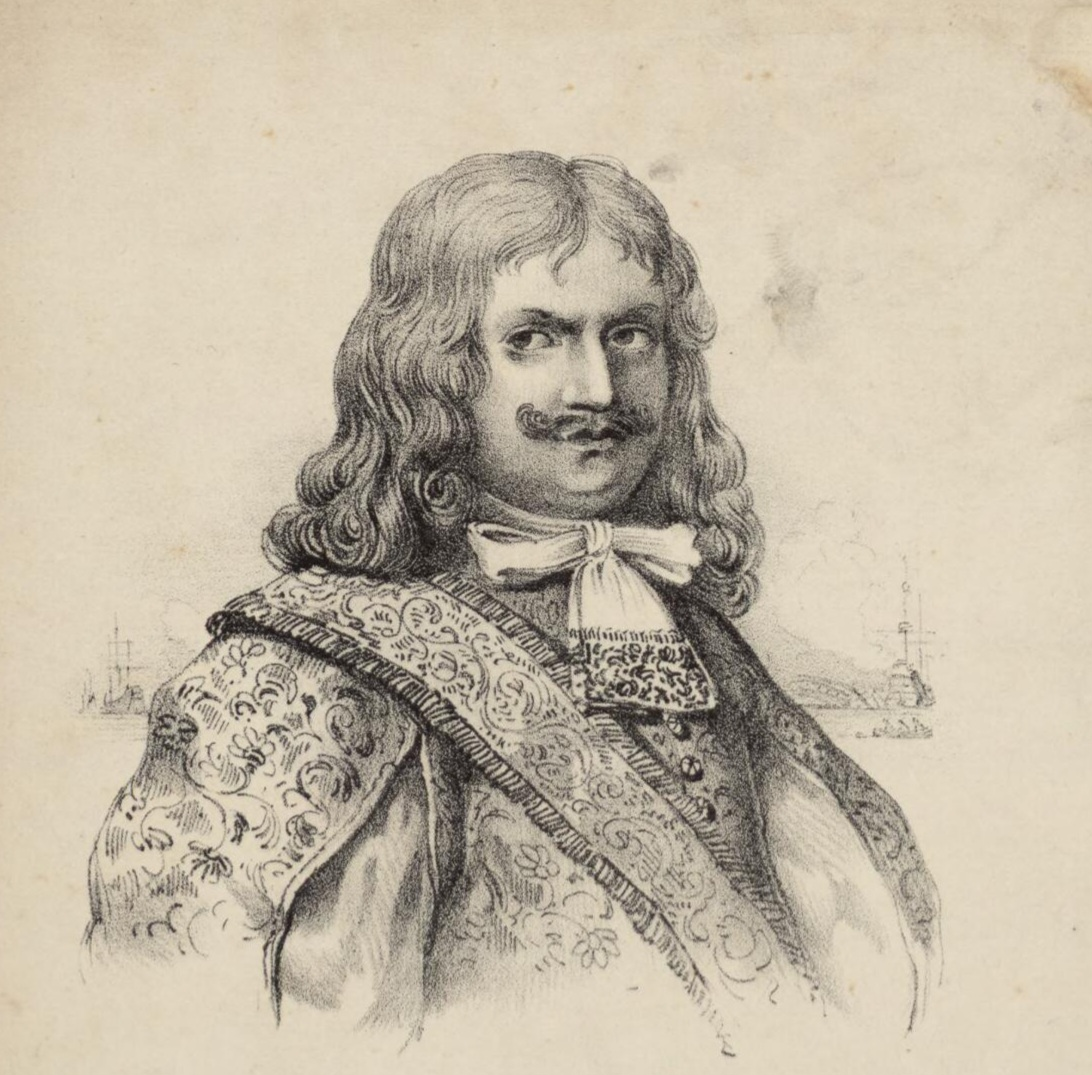
Henry Morgan

Soon after the 26 gun HMS Oxford was given to Morgan as a gift from King Charles II of England. In October 1668 Morgan sailed with ten ships and 800 men for Île-à-Vache, a small island he used as a rendezvous point. His plan was to attack the Spanish port of Cartagena de Indias, the richest and most important city on the Spanish Main. On 2 January 1669 Morgan called a council of war for all his captains, which took place on Oxford. Anchored off the Île à Vache, a party took place onboard - somehow during the drunken excitement the powder magazine was ignited by a loose spark and subsequently the ship was blown up. Over 200 were killed with the only survivors being six men and four boys of the crew. Morgan was lucky as he and the six other captains that sat on the same side survived, while those opposite him were killed.

Recovering from the disaster, Morgan needed another ship. The French 36 gun warship Le Cerf Volant had been captured a month before by Edward Collier in the Oxford. The French had been accused of committing acts of piracy against English merchants. Collier's crew searched their ship and found a Letter of Marque given by the Governor of Baracoa, the evidence they needed to cement their claims. The Letter of Marque stated the French were permitted to trade in Spanish ports, however they were also allowed to engage English pirates. Le Cerf Volant was renamed the Satisfaction and the French tried as Pirates in Jamaica but they were reprieved.

The loss of Oxford meant Morgan's flotilla was too small to attempt an attack on Cartagena. By the time they had reached Saona, at the eastern end of Santo Domingo, three more of his ships deserted which included vast majority of the French, bitter about the treatment of their fellow countrymen, leaving only eight ships with 500 men as a whole. With their much-reduced numbers Morgan decided to loot Trinidad, but the fleet broke up en route when other captains chose their own targets. Instead he was persuaded by a French captain Pierre Le Picard under his command to repeat the actions of the Tortuga corsair Jean-David Nau, or better known as François l'Olonnais. Two years previously he led an attacks on Maracaibo and Gibraltar, both on Lake Maracaibo. The lake was eighty six miles long, and up to sixty miles wide. Morgan planned to sail right to the very far end and raid Gibraltar.

Since l'Olonnais and Picard had visited Maracaibo, the Spanish had built the San Carlos de la Barra Fortress, 20 miles (32 km) outside the city, on the approach. The brand new fortress was placed in a strategic position to defend the town, nevertheless it was undermanned, leaving only nine men to load and fire the fortress's eleven guns.

Before heading to Maracaibo, Morgan's fleet came to anchor at the Dutch island of Aruba and stocked up on food and supplies. Other notable privateers who sailed with Morgan were and at least five other captains, veterans of the Portobello attack, Jeffrey Pennant, Richard Norman, Richard Dobson, Edward Dempster, Adam Brewster and John Morris.

== Raid ==
Maracaibo, Cabimas, ciudad Ojeda and Gibraltar

Morgan arrived off Lake Maracaibo on 9 March - Picard knew the approaches to the lagoon, and was able to guide the fleet through a narrow and shallow channel. Within the day they came across the San Carlos de la Barra Fortress and immediately bombarded the fort. One of Morgan's ships Lilly gave covering cannon fire whilst his men landed on the beach. They waited till it was after dark and then stormed the fortification and breached its defences. The privateers were surprised to find the fort abandoned. They soon discovered that it had only been garrisoned by an officer and eight men. Nevertheless, they had left a slow-burning fuse leading to the fort's powder kegs as a trap for the buccaneers. Morgan's men however managed to extinguish all of the fuses. All sixteen of the fort's guns were spiked and then buried so they could not be used against the privateers when they returned from the rest of their mission.

Morgan then ordered the rest of the ships through the channel and was able to victual the fleet from the much needed fort's powder and firearms. Morgan proceeded South to Maracaibo navigating the shoals - some areas were too shallow to navigate and rather than risk grounding, the Privateers took to small boats and canoes.

=== Maracaibo ===
The privateers rowed steadily into Maracaibo and after landing assaulted the fort first - only to find it deserted. As they moved into the city itself it was clear its residents had been forewarned of their approach by the fortress's troops. The privateers then searched the surrounding jungle upwards of some thirty miles to find the escapees. Some 100 prisoners were taken in addition to cattle, slaves and other valuables. The remaining occupants, were tortured in different ways to find where money or treasure had been hidden.

Over the course of three weeks the English held the town with Morgan using the St. Peter and St. Paul Cathedral as his headquarters. Six merchant vessels were captured and some 500 pieces of eight was gathered, nevertheless some of the privateers were underwhelmed with the plunder. Around 100 of the towns wealthiest prisoners were kept as a collateral. Morgan nevertheless was satisfied with what he had taken and set off South to the next target - the town of Gibraltar, leaving a small number of privateers in Maracaibo.

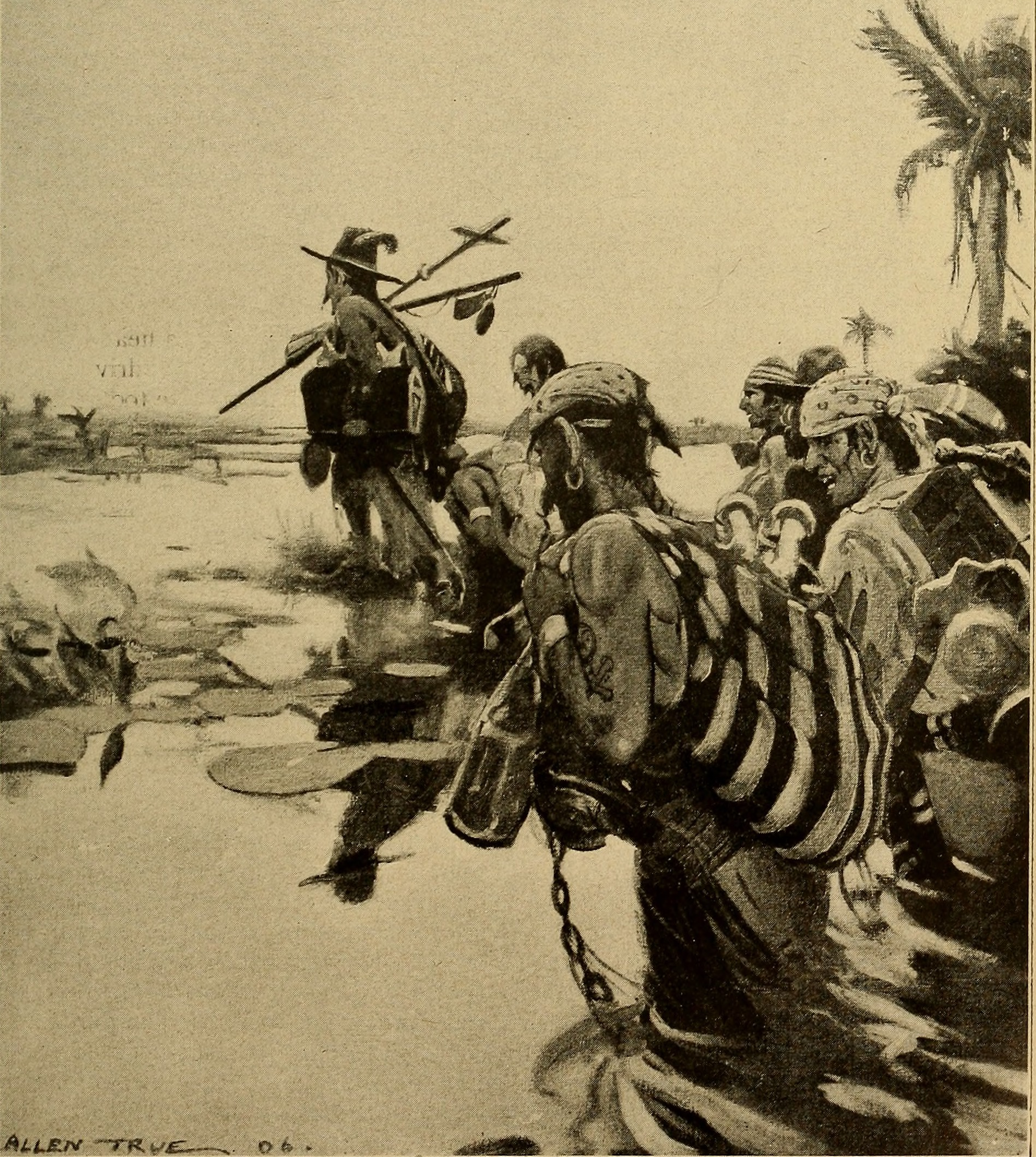
An illustration from the Outing magazine (1885) showing the Privateers wading through the swamp during the raid on Gibraltar

=== Gibraltar ===
Morgan arrived at Gibraltar and sent some prisoners ashore to demand the town's surrender. The town's occupants however refused to surrender, and the fort fired enough of a barrage to ensure Morgan kept his distance. He anchored a short distance away and his men landed by canoe and assaulted the town from the landward approach. The fort was swiftly captured and as they descended into the town met scant resistance. Many of the occupants had fled into the surrounding jungle so Morgan sent out several parties to search the various plantations for prisoners and valuables. Soon some 250 prisoners were taken but none were willing to tell Morgan and his men where they had hidden valuables.

The Privateers then spent the next five weeks in Gibraltar, and there was again evidence that torture was used to force residents to reveal hidden money and valuables. The location of the town's governor was given away by a captured slave. Morgan sent out a 250-man party to a river with an island further inland and discovered the hideout with a small hastily built fort. The island was captured with ease and a number of prisoners of high value were captured. The town's governor managed to escape further south into the hills - the English went after him but heavy rain swelled the rivers and forced their return. Overall the privateers took a good haul - stray vessels contained some valuable goods as well as a large number of slaves from the plantations. Morgan released the prisoners who had paid their ransoms but kept four prominent citizens of the town as collateral. The Privateers were satisfied with what they had captured and headed back North to Maracaibo.

=== Armada de Barlovento ===
Morgan returned to Maracaibo four days later, but on arrival he was told that a Spanish defence squadron, the Armada de Barlovento, was waiting for him at the narrow passage between the Caribbean and Lake Maracaibo. The Armada consisted of three ships - the 412 ton flagship Galleon Magdalena of 48 guns, the 210 ton Patache San Luis of 38 guns and the fifty ton frigate Soledad of 24 guns. Another frigate Nuestra Senora del Carmen had been wrecked but the eighteen guns were retrieved and sent into the San Carlos de la Barra Fortress. The forces, under the command of Don Alonso del Campo y Espinosa, had in all some 126 cannon and some 500 men with which to attack Morgan. Morgan was also informed that Alonso had managed to restore the fortress with what he could - some forty arquebusiers and six guns were repaired or salvaged along with the guns from 'Carmen'. Alonso then dispatched messengers inland calling for further assistance. Alonso lightened his ships so that it could sail into the lake. He also called on Morgan to surrender, giving him a choice; two days to surrender or face annihilation. Morgan in a cheerful message said he looked forward to the 'hazard of battle'.

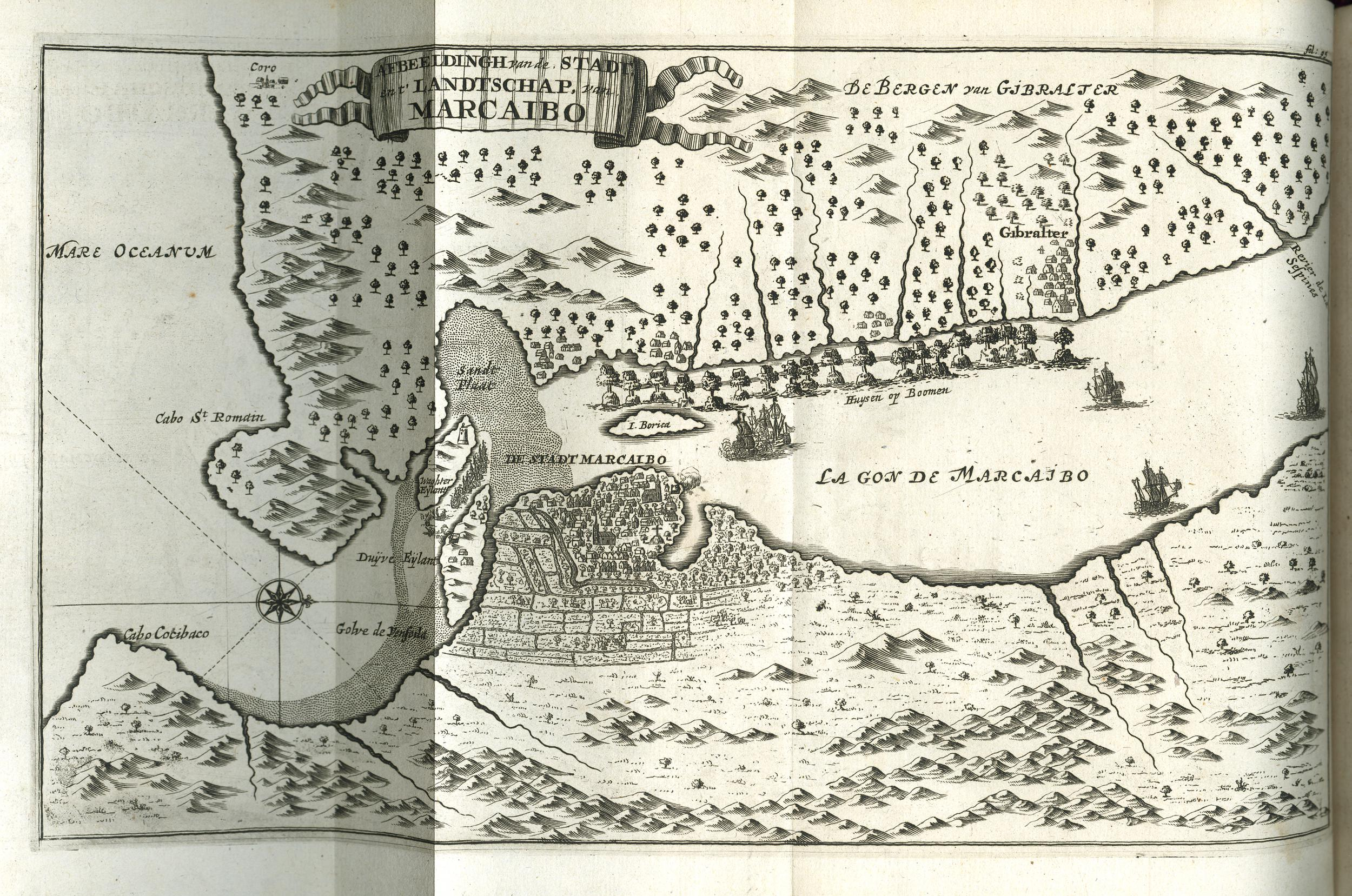
A map of the city of Maracaibo and its surroundings; the ocean at left, Gibraltar at top right, Lake Maracaibo at centre right; illustration to page 95 of Alexandre Exquemelin's "De Americaensche Zee-roovers" (Amsterdam: 1678)

Although Morgan had more ships, none were as powerful as any of the Spanish ships, even Morgans largest ship Lilly was barely a match with the smallest Spanish ship, the frigate Soledad. The Spaniards had orders to end piracy in the Caribbean, and negotiations between Morgan and Alonso continued for a week. The final offer put by the Spanish commander was for Morgan to leave all their spoils and slaves and to return to Jamaica unmolested. No agreement however was reached that would allow Morgan and his men to pass the fleet with their spoils but without being attacked. Morgan put the Spaniards' offers to his men, who voted instead to fight their way out. As they were heavily outgunned, one privateer suggested that a fire ship attack citing Francis Drake's use against the Spanish Armada eighty years earlier. The idea was accepted and they would direct the fire ship towards Alonso's flagship, Magdalen to cause the most confusion.

In Maracaibo, a crew of twelve prepared a ship that had been seized in Gibraltar. They disguised vertical logs of wood with Montera hats, to make the Spaniards believe that the vessel was fully crewed. To make it look more heavily armed, additional portholes were cut in the hull and logs placed to resemble cannons. Barrels of powder were placed in the ship with fuses ready to be lit, tar was spread along with dried palm leaves. Grappling irons were laced into the ships rigging ready to catch the ropes and sails of Magdalen and ensure the vessels would become entangled. Alonso was informed of this activity by runaway slaves and other informants. With this information he drilled his men and set up some defensive measures - barrels of water were placed on the ship in case of the need to put out fires, and long poles were placed in case the privateers came too close.

=== Battle of Lake Maracaibo ===
By April 29 Morgan was satisfied that his small fleet was ready. They had twenty miles to cover the distance between him and the Spanish who lay on the sand bar of the lake. The following day they set sail, and by days end his flotilla saw the Spanish ships anchored across the channel. Morgan decided to anchor given the coming darkness.

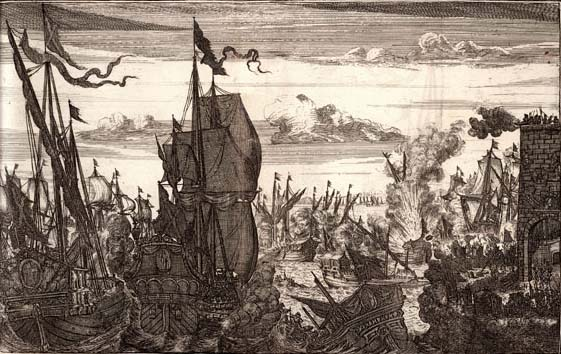
Morgan destroys the Spanish Armada de Barlovento on Lake Maracaibo - 29 April 1669

On the early morning of 1 May, Morgan raised anchor and then sailed towards the Spanish squadron. Alonso to his astonishment saw the fleet heading right towards him without peeling away. The Spanish vessels opened fire at the lead ship, and despite causing serious damage the ship caught fire as planned. Despite the efforts of the Spanish, the fireship ploughed towards the Magdalen. It then crashed into the latter, successfully grappled and immediately caught fire - a strong wind meant that most of the ship was soon in flames. The twelve crewmen of the fireship managed to escape into a small boat. Seeing the fire engulf his flagship Alonso abandoned the vessel and made his way to the fort, where he continued to direct events. Meanwhile, the second-largest Spanish ship, Soledad led by sergeant of the fleet Diego de Varrio, tried to move away from the burning vessel, but a problem with the rigging meant they drifted aimlessly; privateers boarded the ship and in hand-to-hand combat forced the Spaniards overboard. Securing the Patache they then fixed the rigging and were able to steer the ship into safety. Finally the San Luis managed to escape and unloaded its cargo near the fort, but in panic the crew set fire to the ship burning her to the waterline in fear of the English seizing it. The Magdalen burned quickly - attempts by the crew to put the fires out were unsuccessful, many burned and the rest were forced to jump into the water. She soon sank by the bow. Spanish survivors numbered 140 of whom all were captured by Morgans fleet, some clinging to the burning wreckage. Within an hour the Armada de Barlovento had been wiped out.

Flushed with victory the privateers rushed ashore and then attempted to besiege the San Carlos de la Barra Fortress. Led by Collier and Morris they spent the rest of the day firing their muskets at the garrison. An attempt to throw fireballs over and into the fort was seen off by heavy Spanish fire. Morgan meanwhile took possession of La Soledad and transferred his flag there renaming it Satisfaction in honour of the victory he had just won. Nevertheless, he still needed to pass the fortress, and was still out-gunned by the stronghold, which had the ability to destroy the privateer fleet if it tried to pass. Morgan then interrogated the prisoners, one of these the ships pilot, informed Morgan as to what Alonso's intentions were, including that he had orders to give no quarter to the English.

=== Negotiations ===
Morgan had the advantage having trapped Don Alonso in the fort, so he decided to negotiate - he threatened to sack and burn Maracaibo if he was not allowed to sail past unscathed. Although Alonso refused to negotiate, the citizens of Maracaibo entered into talks with Morgan, and agreed to pay him 20,000 pesos and 500 head of cattle if he agreed to leave the city intact. Alonso was furious and threatened to arrest the citizens for treachery.

During the course of the negotiations with the citizens, Morgan had undertaken salvage operations on the wreck of the Magdalen. Some of the coins had even melted and had joined into lumps of bullion. Overall the divers secured between 15,000 - 20,000 pesos from the wreck. The citizens collected the funds and paid up much to Morgan's relief. Morgan then added an addition to his demands - ordering the citizens to plead to Alonso to allow the Privateers to leave unmolested. Despite some protests an elected citizen went to and gave Morgan's demand to Alonso. The Spaniard reacted furiously to Morgan's demand and refused. Morgan thus came up with a plan to escape under the forts guns.

=== Escape ===
Morgan interrogated the Spanish prisoners who gave him valuable information about what Alonso was planning. Morgan spent some time observing Alonso's positions and noticed that he had set his cannon for a landward attack from the privateers – as they had done previously. They had also dug trenches and stripped the fort's battlements of men. It was clear to Morgan that the Spanish had prepared for a night land assault from the English forces. Morgan thus planned to fool the Spanish into making a land attack - he brought a load of men in canoes to the shoreline. Morgan made sure the Spanish saw that they were empty coming back, but were in fact full of men laying down in the bottom of the craft. The ruse was highly successful and with Spanish forces deployed to repel a landing, Morgan's fleet raised anchor without unfurling their sails. Morgan's men were well hidden within the ships and the fleet moved on the tide, raising sail only when it had moved level with the fortress. The Spanish on seeing this assumed the ships were being sailed by skeleton crews.

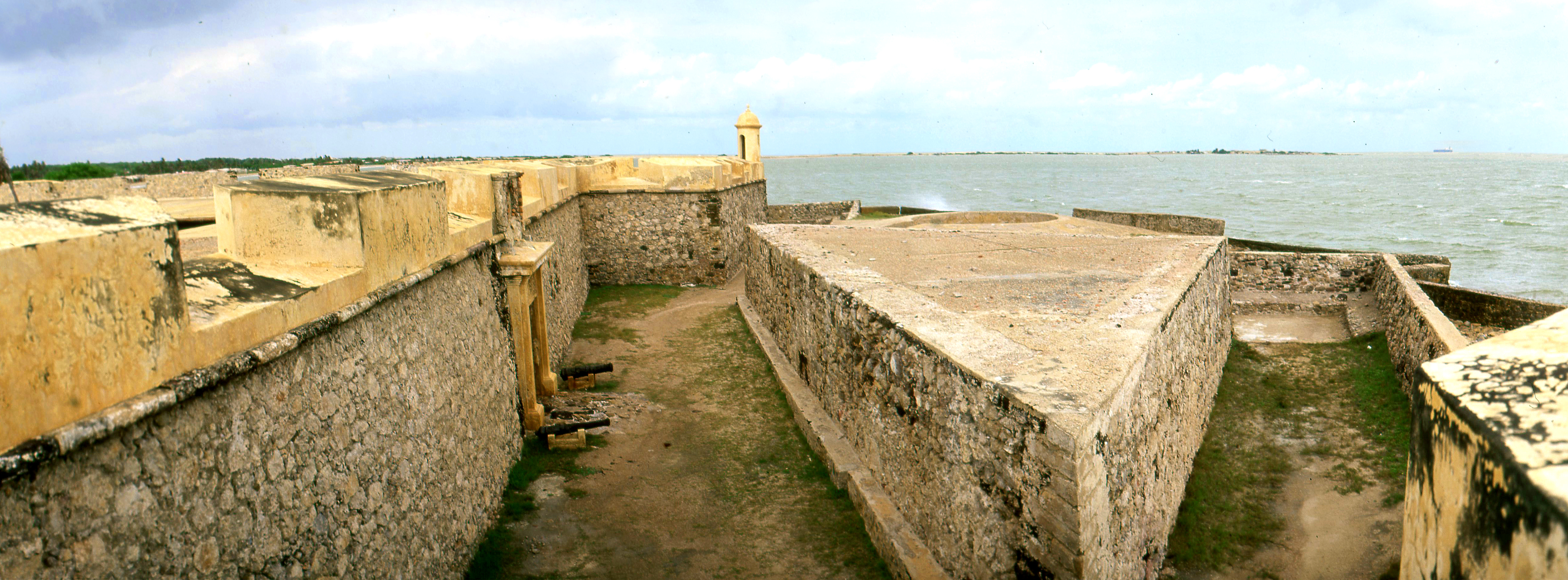
San Carlos de la Barra Fortress, which guarded the entrance to Maracaibo

Before taking any action, Morgan tallied his takings and divided it equally between his ships, to ensure that it was not all lost if one ship was sunk.

By nightfall and no sign of attack Alonso sent out scouts who came back to report the English were nowhere in sight. Alonso realised he had been fooled and knew what was going on. In a fury he ordered the guns to be dragged to the seaward side, and once in position, fired into the darkness. Morgan's ships however were well out of range, and he ordered to fire off a seven gun salute to humiliated Alonso further. Before they headed back to Port Royal, Morgan released the hostages that had been ransomed under a flag of truce to Alonso. The only prisoners he kept were the seven from Gibraltar which were still awaiting a ransom. After this Morgan's fleet made their way back to Port Royal unscathed.

== Aftermath ==
On May 27, 1669, Morgan entered Port Royal in the captured galleon Satisfaction, to a hero's welcome. Guns from Fort Charles fired a salute and hundreds of people flocked to the beaches to wave and cheer them in. The raid was a huge success militarily and financially; some £30,000 (£10,000,000 in today's money) had been acquired, even more than what the Privateers had taken at Porto Bello. Nevertheless, during Morgan's absence from Port Royal, a pro-Spanish faction had gained the ear of King Charles II, and English foreign policy had changed accordingly. Modyford admonished Morgan for his action, which had gone beyond his commission, and revoked further letters of marque. Despite this, no official action was taken against any of the privateers. Morgan invested a share of his prize money in an 836-acre (338 ha) plantation in Clarendon Parish; his second such investment.

For his failure, Alonso was arrested and sent back to Spain in chains on the silver fleet. Over the next two years a series of courts-martial was presented against him but he was finally acquitted of the charges against him in 1671. Based on the excellence of his services, he was consulted for the captaincy general of Puerto Rico, in November 1674, and the title was issued to him, for a term of five years.

Historians have praised Morgan's escape as "characteristic cunning and audacity". The naval battle was also compared to the defeat of the Spanish Armada of 1588 but in miniature.

=== Spanish retaliation ===
Mariana, the Queen Regent of Spain, upon hearing of the Spanish defeat at Maracaibo, was outraged. In revenge she ordered that all English shipping in the Caribbean was to be seized or sunk. In March 1670, Spanish privateers, which included Manuel Ribeiro Pardal under a letter of marque, attacked English merchant shipping. In response, Modyford commissioned Morgan to counter the Spanish attacks and preserve English rule in Jamaica.

=== Morgan's Panama raid ===
Morgan then prepared for what would be his largest and most daring expedition - the capture of the rich city of Panama which lay on the Pacific coast. On 16 December 1670 an army of 1,400 men embarked, completely unaware of a Peace treaty signed between England and Spain. After capturing Old Providence island, Morgan's force then sailed to the Panama Isthmus and also captured Fort San Lorenzo on the mouth of the Río Chagres. The Privateers then set off across the Isthmus, and after a week's march, Morgan's privateer army routed a force of Spanish militia just outside Panama. They subsequently swept in capturing the city, which then led to it being sacked, plundered and burned. Morgan returned unmolested with the plunder, but news of the raid brought Spanish fury, and they accused Morgan and Modyford of having violated the treaty. To restore relations, both Modyford and Morgan were recalled and arrested by the English Crown. They went unpunished, however, and were released. Morgan was even knighted by Charles and later made Lieutenant Governor of Jamaica.

== Legacy ==
- Italian novelist Emilio Salgari wrote a series of adventure novels based on events of the raid - The Black Corsair and Jolanda, the Daughter of the Black Corsair.

== See also ==
- Battle of Lake Maracaibo - another naval battle which took place on 24 July 1823.

== Bibliography ==
Books

- Allen, H. R (1976). Buccaneer: Admiral Sir Henry Morgan. London: Arthur Baker. ISBN 978-0-213-16569-7.
- Breverton, Terry (2005). Admiral Sir Henry Morgan: The Greatest Buccaneer of them all. Pencader, Carmarthenshire: Glyndŵr Publishing. ISBN 978-1-903529-17-1.
- Bradley, Peter T (1999). British Maritime Enterprise in the New World From the Late Fifteenth to the Mid-eighteenth Century. Edwin Mellen Press. ISBN 9780773478664.
- Cordingly, David (2006) [1996]. Under the Black Flag: The Romance and Reality of Life Among the Pirates. London: Random House. ISBN 978-0-8129-7722-6.
- Davenport, Frances Gardiner; Paullin, Charles Oscar, eds. (2004). European Treaties Bearing on the History of the United States and Its Dependencies: Issue 254. The Lawbook Exchange, Ltd. ISBN 9781584774228.
- Earle, Peter (2007). The Sack of Panamá: Captain Morgan and the Battle for the Caribbean. New York: Thomas Dunne Books. ISBN 978-0-312-36142-6.
- Gosse, Phillip (2007) [1932]. The History of Piracy. Mineola, NY: Dover Publications. ISBN 978-0-486-46183-0.
- Latimer, Jon (2009). Buccaneers of the Caribbean: How Piracy Forged an Empire. Harvard University Press. ISBN 978-0-674-03403-7.
- Marley, David (2010). Pirates of the Americas, Volume 1. ABC-CLIO. ISBN 9781598842012.
- Marley, David (1998). Wars of the Americas: A Chronology of Armed Conflict in the New World, 1492 to the Present. Santa Barbara CA: ABC-CLIO. ISBN 9780874368376.
- Paxman, Jeremy (2011). Empire. London: Viking. ISBN 978-0-670-91957-4.
- Pope, Dudley (1978) [1977 (in the UK, as Harry Morgan's Way)]. The Buccaneer King: The Biography of the Notorious Sir Henry Morgan 1635–1688. New York: Dodd, Mead & Co. ISBN 978-0-396-07566-0.
- Rogoziński, Jan (1995). Pirates!: Brigands, Buccaneers, and Privateers in Fact, Fiction, and Legend: An A–Z Encyclopedia. New York: Facts on File. ISBN 978-0-8160-2761-3.
- Thomas, Graham (2014). The Buccaneer King: the Story of Captain Henry Morgan (Kindle ed.). Barnsley, South Yorkshire: Pen & Sword Maritime. ISBN 978-1-4738-3522-1.
- Talty, Stephan (2007). Empire of Blue Water: Henry Morgan and the Pirates Who Ruled the Caribbean Waves. London: Simon & Schuster. ISBN 978-1-4165-0293-7.

Articles and journals

- Barbour, Violet (April 1911). "Privateers and Pirates of the West Indies". The American Historical Review. 16 (3): 529–566. doi:10.2307/1834836. JSTOR 1834836.
- Zahedieh, Nuala (2004a). "Morgan, Sir Henry (c.1635–1688)". Oxford Dictionary of National Biography (online ed.). Oxford University Press. doi:10.1093/ref:odnb/19224. (Subscription, Wikipedia Library access or UK public library membership required.)
- Zahedieh, Nuala (2004b). "Modyford, Sir Thomas, First Baronet (c.1620–1679)". Oxford Dictionary of National Biography (online ed.). Oxford University Press. doi:10.1093/ref:odnb/18871. (Subscription, Wikipedia Library access or UK public library membership required.)
