= Henry Morgan's raid on Puerto del Príncipe =

Raid on Puerto del Príncipe (1668)
- Part of the Anglo-Spanish War (1654–1671)
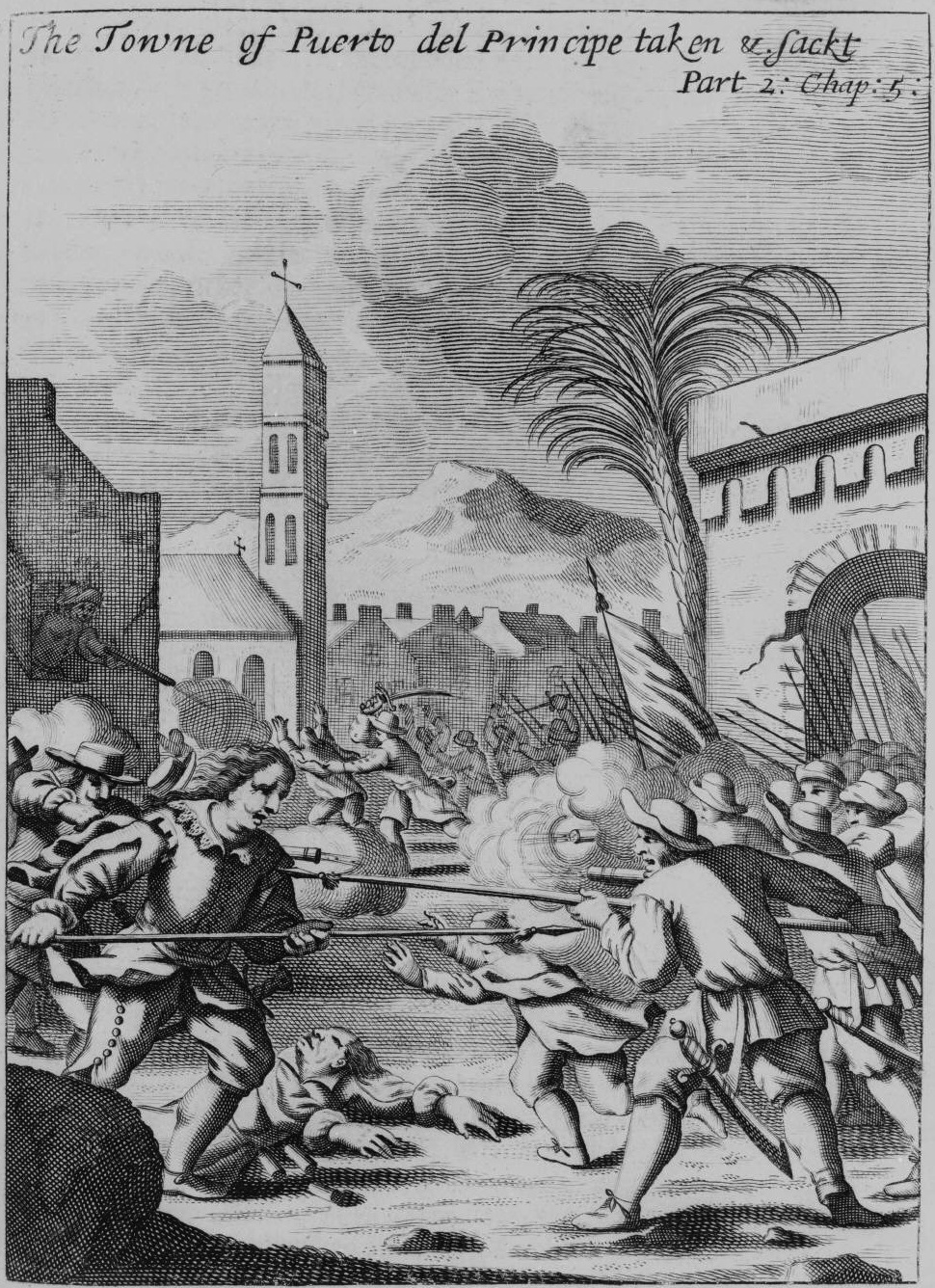
- Puerto del Príncipe being sacked in 1668 by Henry Morgan - illustration from 'The Buccaneers of America' by John Esquemeling
Date	22 March – 1 April 1668
Location	Puerto del Príncipe, Cuba 21°23′2″N 77°54′27″W
Result	English victory

Belligerents
Spain	England

Commanders and leaders
(Spain) Unknown	(Kingdom of England) Henry Morgan

Strength
800 soldiers and militia	8 ships 650 men

Casualties and losses
100 killed, 600 wounded or captured	Light

The Raid on Puerto del Príncipe was a military event which took place during the latter stage of the Anglo-Spanish War between March and April 1668 on the Spanish island of Cuba. Some 700 Buccaneers in twelve ships led by Captain Henry Morgan landed in the Gulf of Santa María and marched to capture the inland town of Puerto del Príncipe.

As they approached the town, they defeated the Spanish militia gathered by the city's Governor in the Battle of la Savana. They then captured the town before plundering and sacking the place, while also gathering a small ransom for the town's prisoners.

== Background ==
England and Spain had remained in a state of war in the Caribbean following the Restoration of Charles II in 1660. England having taken possession of Jamaica since 1657 had yet to be confirmed by Spain in a treaty. As a result, Buccaneers were invited, to base themselves at Port Royal, to help defend against Spanish attacks.

In 1667 diplomatic relations between the kingdoms of England and Spain were worsening, and rumours began to circulate in Jamaica about a possible Spanish invasion. Henry Morgan, who had been in charge of the Port Royal militia took over further privateering expeditions as Admiral in Chief of the Confederacy of Buccaneers. Thomas Modyford the Governor of Jamaica thus gave him a letter of marque "to draw together the English privateers and take prisoners of the Spanish nation, whereby he might inform of the intention of that enemy to attack Jamaica, of which I have frequent and strong advice". Many of the Privateers were from England and her colonies but included many French and a few Dutch volunteers. Some of the English were veterans from the English Civil War and Morgan had the men trained in the New Model Army style of warfare.

In January 1668, Morgan assembled 10 ships and 500 men; he was subsequently joined by two more ships and 200 men, most of whom were French from Tortuga. Morgan ordered his fleet to rendezvous off southern Cuba, which including such notable commanders as John Morris and Edward Collier. On March 1 they headed towards Havana with the intention to attack the large port.

== Raid ==
Morgan's fleet arrived off Havana in mid-March, but on discovering that it was heavily defended, they instead sailed to Santiago de Cuba. The city had only just recovered from the raid by Christopher Myngs six year earlier, so whilst here they briefly blockaded it whilst Morgan and his captains gave options for other targets. One of them made the suggestion of Puerto del Príncipe, a town nearly 334 miles (540 km) East of Havana and at least 50 miles (80 km) inland which had not been sacked.

After encountering little in the way of prizes they sailed into the Gulf of Santa María where Morgan's fleet arrived on 27 March and landed on the beach at Santa María. The Spanish governor had been informed that a fleet had been seen along the south coast and therefore put in preparations to defend the town. Some 800 soldiers, militia and native spearmen were gathered, and ambushes along the route towards the city were set up.

A 1639 map of Cuba - Puerto del Príncipe is in the centre of the island

=== Battle of La Savana ===
Morgan did not approach the town directly as the Spanish governor of Puerto del Príncipe was hoping, so marched his men off via the dense jungle. After a two day long march along rolling hills that stood between the coast and the inland plains, they came across an open plain called 'La savana'.

Morgan set his men up in a large crescent fighting formation and prepared for battle. The Spanish governor soon realised he had been deceived and on seeing the approaching force immediately sent his cavalry out to disperse the English. The Spanish cavalry threw themselves against the solid wall of privateers and were repelled with some loss. Once the cavalry had fled the main body of Spanish infantry now approached and a pitched battle began.

The Spanish infantry charged against the privateers' but the latter's accurate musket fire nevertheless soon took its toll on the Spanish. They were surprised at the discipline of the soldiers they faced, marching in rank and file with English colours flying. The Governor was killed and the Spanish line began to waver. The English and French then charged against the Spaniards who broke before them and then attempted to retreat. Morgan's men in the crescent formation soon found its way around the Spanish and managed to cut most of them off. The remnants attempted to escape into the nearby forest but they and their native allies lost most of their force, some 700 were either killed, wounded or captured. Morgan's men suffered less than twenty casualties.

=== Capture and ransom ===
The privateers then approached the town but were fired at by the inhabitants from holes made within their houses. Morgan threatened severe reprisals if he was not allowed to march in and the Spanish surrendered. The inhabitants were then rounded up and then locked up in several of the city's churches. The Privateers then pillaged the homes, buildings and churches and following this went on the rampage through the countryside beyond. Day by day they brought in many prisoners as well as goods. There was much wine too and the privateers drank most of it turning them into a drunken rabble which even Morgan could not control.

After nearly a week many of the Privateers came back with some booty they had found hidden in the woods and fields. Morgan had four prisoners sent to demand a ransom for the prisoners - they were sent out beyond the town. Days later they came back claiming they could not find anyone and so demanded more time, which Morgan granted. Two days later however Morgan was given a captured negro slave who had with him some letters from the Governor of Oriente Province, Pedro Bayona Villanueva forbidding any payments to be made and that help would be on the way with a relief force. Morgan was furious and ordered the inhabitants to deliver up to a thousand cattle which they would send to the English ships - to this they agreed.

After fifteen days of occupation, Morgan left by the route he came by and before they embarked, the inhabitants gathered some 500 cattle which Morgan was satisfied with. The cattle were then slaughtered on the beach and salted before being casked to go on the ships.

== Aftermath ==
The treasure was counted - some 50,000 pieces of eight was obtained which was less than hoped for especially with 650 men. According to Alexandre Exquemelin, it particularly caused great resentment on the French who felt they had been cheated. An insurrection was even started by the French accusing an Englishman of stealing. Morgan quelled the insurrection by having the Englishman hanged as a compromise.

When Morgan reported the taking of Puerto Principe to Modyford, he informed the governor that they had evidence that the Spanish were planning an attack on British territory: "we found seventy men had been pressed to go against Jamaica ... and considerable forces were expected from Vera Cruz and Campeachy ... and from Porto Bello and Cartagena to rendezvous at St Jago of Cuba [Santiago]".

For the Spanish the raid brought indignation both at Havana and Santiago. A few days after Morgan had evacuated Puerto Principe, Villanueva, wrote testily to the Queen Regent. Mariana. He also laid a charges of misconduct against the officers and the mayor of the town for its loss.

Morgan with the casked meat on board his fleet was now well supplied for his next venture - he had his eyes set on a bigger prize, the port town of Porto Bello. The town was captured along with all of its fortifications and sacked. The English repelled a Spanish counter sent by the Governor of Panama and having then received a large ransom before leaving for Jamaica unmolested.

Puerto Principe never really recovered from the attack. The city was redesigned like a maze so attackers would find it hard to move around inside the city. It was renamed Camiguay in 1898 following Cuba's independence from Spain.

== Bibliography ==
- Allen, H. R (1976). Buccaneer: Admiral Sir Henry Morgan. London: Arthur Baker. ISBN 978-0-213-16569-7.
- Breverton, Terry (2005). Admiral Sir Henry Morgan: The Greatest Buccaneer of them all. Pencader, Carmarthenshire: Glyndŵr Publishing. ISBN 978-1-903529-17-1.
- Davenport, Frances Gardiner; Paullin, Charles Oscar, eds. (2004). European Treaties Bearing on the History of the United States and Its Dependencies: Issue 254. The Lawbook Exchange, Ltd. ISBN 9781584774228.
- Exquemelin, John (2010) [1684]. The Buccaneers of America: A True Account of the Most Remarkable Assaults Committed of Late Years Upon the Coasts of the West Indies by the Buccaneers of Jamaica and Tortuga. Cambridge University Press: Cambridge. ISBN 978-1-108-02481-5.
- Gosse, Phillip (2007) [1932]. The History of Piracy. Mineola, NY: Dover Publications. ISBN 978-0-486-46183-0.
- Latimer, Jon (2009). Buccaneers of the Caribbean: How Piracy Forged an Empire. Harvard University Press. ISBN 978-0-674-03403-7.
- Marley, David (1998). Wars of the Americas: A Chronology of Armed Conflict in the New World, 1492 to the Present. Santa Barbara CA: ABC-CLIO. ISBN 9780874368376.
- Pope, Dudley (1978) [1977 (in the UK, as Harry Morgan's Way)]. The Buccaneer King: The Biography of the Notorious Sir Henry Morgan 1635–1688. New York: Dodd, Mead & Co. ISBN 978-0-396-07566-0.
- Rogoziński, Jan (1995). Pirates!: Brigands, Buccaneers, and Privateers in Fact, Fiction, and Legend: An A–Z Encyclopedia. New York: Facts on File. ISBN 978-0-8160-2761-3.
- Thomas, Graham (2014). The Buccaneer King: the Story of Captain Henry Morgan (Kindle ed.). Barnsley, South Yorkshire: Pen & Sword Maritime. ISBN 978-1-4738-3522-1.
- Talty, Stephan (2007). Empire of Blue Water: Henry Morgan and the Pirates Who Ruled the Caribbean Waves. London: Simon & Schuster. ISBN 978-1-4165-0293-7.
