= Edward Collier =

Edward Collier may refer to:

- Evert Collier (1642–1708), Dutch painter
- Edward Collier (pirate), English buccaneer
