= Governor Hawley =

Governor Hawley may refer to:

- Henry Hawley (colonial administrator) (fl. 1620s–1640s), English Governor of Barbados
- Henry Hawley (1685–1759), Governor of Inverness, and later Governor of Portsmouth
- James H. Hawley (1847–1929), ninth Governor of Idaho
- Joseph R. Hawley (1826–1905), 42nd Governor of Connecticut
