= Henry Huncks =

English soldier

Sir Henry Huncks

Governor of Nevis
- In office 1637–1638
- Preceded by: Thomas Spurrow
- Succeeded by: James Jennings

Governor of Barbados
- In office June 1640 – 1641
- Preceded by: Henry Hawley
- Succeeded by: Philip Bell

Personal details
- Born: c. 1595
- Occupation: Soldier

Sir Henry Huncks (born c. 1595) was an English soldier who was briefly governor of Barbados from 1640 to 1641. During the English Civil War, he was a lieutenant colonel in the army, fighting on the Cavalier side in support of the king.

== Early years ==
Henry Huncks was the son of Sir Thomas Huncks and Catherine Conway, sister of Edward Conway, 1st Viscount Conway, the Secretary of State for Kings James I and Charles I. He was governor of Nevis from 1637 to 1638, replacing Thomas Spurrow. He was succeeded in this post by James Jennings.

== Barbados ==
Sergeant-Major Henry Huncks was appointed Governor of Barbados in March 1639, and his appointment was confirmed by the King. When he arrived in Barbados in July 1639 he found that his predecessor Henry Hawley was refused to give up power. Hawley had disputed that James Hay, 2nd Earl of Carlisle, was owner of the island, and had set up a parliament which proclaimed Hawley as governor. Huncks was threatened with death if he demanded the government, and was forced to leave, sailing to Antigua. Huncks served as governor of Antigua for six months. One of his opponents called Huncks "a drunken, vindictive tyrant." He was accused of raping a female colonist.

In June 1640, commissioners from King Charles arrived in Barbados "in the business between the Earl of Carlisle and Captain Hawley." Hawley resigned the government, acknowledged his offense, and submitted to the commissioners, who had him taken to England in custody. Henry Huncks was brought back from Antigua and assumed office. He was immediately engaged in controversy. Captain James Futter asked Judge Read "in open Court, If all whore-masters were taken off the Bench, what would the Governor [Henry Huncks] do for a Council?" Huncks sided with the planters against Peter and John Hay, who were charged with collecting rents on behalf of Lord Carlisle. At one point he threatened to make Peter Hay "shorter by the heade." Later he and his council threw Peter Hay in prison. However, it may have been due to the Hays' petitions that Huncks was recalled. On 18 June 1641 he handed over to Captain Philip Bell, a former Governor of Bermuda and then of Old Providence.

== Later career ==
Henry Huncks returned to England, where he fought on the Royalist side in the English Civil War. He was appointed lieutenant-colonel of foot in the Earl of Northampton's Regiment on 16 November 1641. He was knighted by King Charles I on 1 January 1642, at Oxford. On 22 March 1642 he was appointed Lieutenant-Governor of Banbury Castle. In May 1643, complaints were made of Huncks on suspicion of corresponding with the rebels, and he was sent to render an account to the king. His mother died in 1646, and Henry Huncks became involved in a legal dispute with Henry Viscount Conway over assignment of £500 that she had left in her will.
