= Edward Dempster =

Edward Dempster (fl. 1667–1669) was a buccaneer and privateer active in the Caribbean. He is best known for his association with Henry Morgan.

== History ==
Dempster received a commission as a privateer from Governor of Jamaica Thomas Modyford in 1667. Sailing his frigate Relief against the Spanish under his privateering commission, he captured the ship Nuestra Seora de la Concepción y San José off Campeche. (Note: Referred to in various sources as Nostra Seora de la Concepcion y San Joseph, Our Lady of Conception and St. Joseph, or Nuestra Señora de la Concepción Y San José.) His prize was confirmed upon his return to Jamaica, where the ship and its cargo were sold to future Governor Hender Molesworth. It was renamed Crescent and sent back to England, where the Spanish ambassador lodged a complaint and requested its return.

While Morgan gathered a large buccaneer fleet to cruise against Puerto Bello and Venezuela in 1668, Dempster took 300 men to blockade Havana, possibly in attempt to aid Indian natives who had reportedly rebelled against the Spanish. His forces cruised between Havana and Campeche but the expedition was unproductive and by year's end Dempster sailed to Ile à Vache to rendezvous with Morgan.

In January 1669 Morgan had gathered over 1000 buccaneers and a fleet of ships, including the warship Oxford. With such a massive force they planned to attack rich and well-defended Cartagena. Morgan and several captains (Dempster not among them) were dining aboard the Oxford when it was blown apart, possibly by an accidental spark in the powder stores. Morgan and a few others survived but over 200 sailors and officers were killed. With their much-reduced numbers Morgan decided to loot Trinidad, but the fleet broke up en route when other captains chose their own targets.

Now with only 500 buccaneers remaining, Morgan was persuaded to attempt a repeat of L'Olonnais' sack of Maracaibo instead. Dempster and six other commanders accompanied Morgan to Venezuela and joined his successful raid of Maracaibo and Gibraltar, the last record of Dempster's buccaneering.

== See also ==
- John Morris – Another buccaneer captain who stayed with Morgan through the Maracaibo campaign.
