= Modyford baronets =

Extinct baronetcy in the Baronetage of England

Escutcheon of the Modyford Baronets of London (1661)

There have been two baronetcies created for members of the Modyford family, both in the Baronetage of England. Both creations are extinct.

The Modyford Baronetcy, of London, was created in the Baronetage of England on 16 February 1661 for James Modyford, Deputy-governor of Jamaica. The title became extinct on the death of the second Baronet in 1678.

The Modyford Baronetcy, of Lincoln's Inn, was created in the Baronetage of England on 1 March 1664 for Thomas Modyford, Governor of Jamaica from 1664 to 1670. He was the brother of the first Baronet of the 1661 creation. The title became extinct on the early death of the fifth Baronet in 1702.

== Modyford baronets, of London (1661) ==
- Sir James Modyford, 1st Baronet (c. 1625–1673)
- Sir Thomas Modyford, 2nd Baronet (died 1678)

== Modyford baronets, of Lincoln's Inn (1664) ==
- Sir Thomas Modyford, 1st Baronet (c. 1618–1679)
- Sir Thomas Modyford, 2nd Baronet (died 1679)
- Sir Charles Modyford, 3rd Baronet (died 1687)
- Sir Norton Modyford, 4th Baronet (1674–1690)
- Sir Thomas Modyford, 5th Baronet (1679–1702)
