= William Willoughby, 3rd Baron Willoughby of Parham =

English peer

William Willoughby, 3rd Baron Willoughby of Parham (1584 – 28 August 1617) was an English peer.

He was born in Knaith, England, the son of William Willoughby and Elizabeth Hilyard. He inherited his title in 1603 from his grandfather, Charles Willoughby, 2nd Baron Willoughby of Parham.

On 4 February 1602/03, he married Frances Manners, daughter of John Manners, 4th Earl of Rutland, and Elizabeth Charlton. He had three sons. Henry, 4th Baron, Francis, 5th Baron, and William, 6th Baron, and a daughter Frances Willoughby (died 1649), who married Sir Bulstrode Whitelocke (1605–1675), Lord Keeper of the Great Seal, and was the mother of six daughters and Sir William Whitelock.

Peerage of England
Preceded by Charles Willoughby	Baron Willoughby of Parham; 1603–1617	Succeeded by Henry Willoughby
