= List of governors of Barbados =

List of colonial governors of Barbados

Flag of the governor of Barbados (1870–1966)

Governor of Barbados refers to the office held by the colony's chief executive during British rule. This list covers the office from the beginning of English settlement in 1627 to Barbados's independence on 30 November 1966. From 1833 to 1885, the governor also served in the Windward Islands administration; the scope of the office therefore differed from that of the earlier and later periods.

The dates below require citations from reliable sources. Acting governors are listed separately, even when their service fell within another governor's nominal term. A dash indicates that an end date has not been established in the source used for the entry.

== Governors of Barbados under proprietary and Crown rule (1627–1833) ==
Name	Start of service	End of service	Status or note	Source
Henry Powell	17 February 1627	1628	Listed as governor; status and term require verification	
William Deane	1628	June 1628		
Charles Wolferstone	June 1628	26 February 1629		
John Powell	26 February 1629	29 August 1629		
Robert Wheatley	29 August 1629	September 1629	Acting	
Sir William Tufton	21 December 1629	16 July 1630		
Henry Hawley	1630	June 1640		
Richard Peers	1633	1634	Acting during Henry Hawley's term	
William Hawley	1638	1639	Acting during Henry Hawley's term	
Sir Henry Huncks	June 1640	1641		
Philip Bell	1641	1650		
Francis Willoughby, 5th Baron Willoughby of Parham	May 1650	1651	Listed as serving in dissidence until January 1652	
George Ayscue	October 1651	1652		
Daniel Searle	1652	July 1660	Acting	
Thomas Modyford	July 1660	1660	Acting	
Humphrey Walrond	1660	August 1663	Acting	
Francis Willoughby, 5th Baron Willoughby of Parham	August 1663	23 July 1666	Listed as restored	
Henry Willoughby	1664	1664	Acting during Francis Willoughby's term	
Henry Willoughby	July 1666	1667	Acting; second period listed	
William Willoughby	1667	1667	Acting	
Samuel Barwick	1667	1667	Acting	
Henry Hawley	1667	April 1667	Acting; second period listed	
William Willoughby	April 1667	1673		
Christopher Codrington	1668	1669	Acting during William Willoughby's term	
Peter Colleton	1673	1674	Acting	
Jonathan Atkins	1674	1679		
John Witham	1680	1683	Acting	
Richard Dutton	1683	1685		
Edwyn Stede	1685	1690	Acting	
James Kendall	1690	1694		
Francis Russell	1694	1696		
Francis Bond	1696	December 1697	Acting	
Ralph Grey	December 1697	1701		
John Farmer	1701	1703	Acting	
Bevil Granville	1703	1706		
Mitford Crowe	1707	1710		
George Lillington	1710	1711	Acting	
Robert Lowther	1711	1720		
William Sharpe	January 1714	1715	Acting during Robert Lowther's term	
John Frere	1720	1721	Acting	
Samuel Cox	1721	1722	Acting	
Henry Worsley	1722	1727		
Thomas Catesby Paget	1727	1731		
James Dotin	1731	1731	Acting; first period listed	
Walter Chetwynd	1731	1732		
Emanuel Howe, 2nd Viscount Howe	1733	29 March 1735		
James Dotin	1735	1737	Acting; second period listed	
Orlando Bridgeman	1737	1738		
Humphrey Howarth	1738	1738		
Thomas Gage, 1st Viscount Gage	1738	1739		
Robert Byng	May 1739	1740		
James Dotin	1740	1740	Acting; third period listed	
Sir Thomas Robinson	1742	1747		
Henry Grenville	1747	1756		
Charles Pinfold	1756	1766		
Samuel Rous	1766	1768	Acting; first period listed	
William Spry	1768	1772		
Samuel Rous	1772	1772	Acting; second period listed	
Edward Hay	1772	1779		
John Dotin	1779	1780	Acting; first period listed	
James Cunninghame	1780	1782		
John Dotin	1783	1784	Acting; second period listed	
David Parry	1784	1793		
William Bishop	1793	1794	Acting; first period listed	
George Poyntz Ricketts	1794	1800		
William Bishop	1800	1801	Acting; second period listed	
Francis Mackenzie, 1st Baron Seaforth	1802	1806		
John Spooner	1806	1810	Acting	
Sir George Beckwith	1810	1815		
Sir James Leith	10 May 1815	16 October 1816		
John Foster Alleyne	1817	1817	Acting	
Stapleton Cotton	1817	1820		
John Brathwaite Skeete	1820	1820	Acting	
Samuel Hinds	1821	1821	Acting	
Sir Henry Warde	1821	1829		
James Frederick Lyon	1829	1833		

== Governors of Barbados and the Windward Islands (1833–1885) ==
From 1833 to 1885, the governor of Barbados also held authority in the Windward Islands administration. Local arrangements and the extent of the governor's authority varied; the title should not be taken to mean that every island was administered directly from Barbados.

Name	Start of service	End of service	Status or note	Source
Sir Lionel Smith	1833	1836		
Sir Evan John Murray MacGregor	1836	1841		
Charles Henry Darling	1841	1841		
Charles Edward Grey	1841	1846		
William Reid	1846	1848		
William MacBean George Colebrooke	1848	1856		
Francis Hincks	1856	4 January 1862		
James Walker	4 January 1862	1868		
Rawson William Rawson	1868	1875		
Sanford Freeling	1875	1875	Acting	
John Pope Hennessy	1875	1876		
George Cumine Strahan	1876	1880		
Dominic Jacotin Gamble	1880	1880	Acting	
William Robinson	1880	1885		

== Governors of Barbados as a separate British colony (1885–1966) ==
In 1885 Barbados ceased to be part of the Windward Islands administration and again had a separate colonial governor. Barbados achieved independence on 30 November 1966; the final colonial governor's term ended the preceding day. For a list of Governor-General's in Barbados after independence, see Governor-General of Barbados.

Name	Start of service	End of service	Status or note	Source
Sir Charles Cameron Lees	1885	1889		
Walter Joseph Sendall	1889	1891		
James Shaw Hay	1891	1900		
Frederick Mitchell Hodgson	18 February 1900	1904		
Gilbert Thomas Carter	14 October 1904	1911		
Leslie Probyn	13 February 1911	1918		
Sir Charles Richard Mackey O'Brien	27 September 1918	1925		
William Charles Fleming Robertson	31 December 1925	21 January 1933		
Harry Scott Newlands	21 January 1933	12 March 1933		
Mark Aitchison Young	5 August 1933	March 1938		
Sir Eubule John Waddington	6 August 1938	1941		
Sir Henry Grattan Bushe	23 October 1941	1947		
Sir Hilary Rudolph Robert Blood	5 February 1947	1949		
Sir Alfred William Lungley Savage	1 November 1949	1953		
Robert Arundell	14 May 1953	1959		
Sir John Montague Stow	8 October 1959	29 November 1966		

== See also ==
- List of governors of the Windward Islands
- Governor-General of Barbados
- Governor-General of the West Indies Federation
- List of colonial secretaries of Barbados
- List of governors of the Windward Islands
- History of Barbados
