= Humphrey Walrond =

Humphrey Walrond (c. 1600 – c. 1670), was acting Governor and later Deputy-Governor of Barbados

== Life ==
=== Family ===
Walrond, born about 1600, was the eldest son of Humphrey Walrond of Sea in the parish of Ilminster, Somerset, and his wife Elizabeth, daughter of John Colles and Anne (née Thynne) of Barton, Somerset. He must be distinguished from his first cousin, Humphrey, eldest son of William Walrond of Islebrewers, who entered at Wadham College, Oxford, on 8 May 1618, was demy of Magdalen from 1618 to 1624, fought on the royalist side in the civil war, and compounded in 1646, having "come in" on the Oxford articles

=== Civil War ===
Humphrey Walrond of Sea succeeded to the family estates on his father's death on 17 Feb. 1620–1. He sided with the royalists when the civil war broke out, but, according to the statement in his petition to compound, he accepted no commission from the king, and used his influence to protect those well affected to parliament from royalist soldiers; for this conduct he was robbed by the king's soldiers and driven into the garrison at Bridgwater. He appears, however, to have held the rank of colonel, though his name does not occur in Peacock's Lists, and after the Restoration he made his services in the royalist cause a claim to the favour of Charles II. He was given up as a hostage when Bridgwater surrendered to Fairfax on 23 July 1645, and was lodged in the Gatehouse, London. His petition to be allowed to compound, dated 28 Oct. 1645, was granted, and on 26 June following he was fined £350. On 20 March 1646–7 his wife petitioned that the estate might not be let to other tenants, as she was endeavouring to collect the fine; this also was granted, as was Walrond's request that his eldest son George might be included in the composition. On 3 Feb. 1650–1, however, the committee learnt that Walrond had sold his estate and gone to Barbados.

=== Barbados ===
Walrond had actually reached Barbados in 1649, either with or preceded by his brother Edward, a lawyer. The island had hitherto enjoyed immunity from civil strife, but the execution of Charles I and arrival of many ruined cavaliers gave the Walronds an opportunity, which they were not slow to use, of turning "Little England", as Barbados was called, into a rallying point for the royalist cause. Their first step was to procure the dismissal from the island treasurership of Colonel Guy Molesworth and put in his place Major Byam, a nominee of their own. Their next project, a league with the royalist Bermudas, was thwarted; and, to alarm the cavaliers in Barbados, they spread a report that the Roundheads intended to put them all to the sword. They then procured an act of the Barbados assembly compelling every one to take an oath to defend the king; but the governor, Philip Bell, was induced to postpone its promulgation. The Walronds thereupon collected an armed force and marched on the "Bridge", as Bridgetown was then called; the governor was warned, but after arresting Humphrey Walrond, he weakly released him, and granted practically all that the insurgents demanded. Charles II was proclaimed on 8 May 1650.

Meanwhile, on 29 April Francis, Lord Willoughby of Parham, who had purchased Lord Carlisle's proprietary rights in the island, arrived off Barbados. The Walronds, who were loth to share the spoils of victory with another, spread reports that Willoughby was still a roundhead, and prevented his recognition as governor for three months. Willoughby's tact, however, prevailed, and he was received as governor. At first he left the Walronds undisturbed, and they practically ruled Barbados during his absence on a visit to other West Indian islands; but on his return Humphrey Walrond, whose violence had alienated the more moderate royalists, was deprived of his regiment and the command of the fortifications. When Sir George Ayscue, the Commonwealth commander, arrived in October 1651 and created a revolution in the island, Walrond was one of those banished for a year by act of the assembly on 4 March 1651–2. A little later he was forbidden to return without a license from parliament or the council of state. His movements for the next eight years are obscure; but apparently he enlisted in the Spanish service, probably in the West Indies, for on 5 August 1653, Philip IV created him Marqués de Vallado, Conde de Parama, Conde de Valderonda, and a grandee of the first class.

At the Restoration Willoughby again became governor of Barbados, and on 24 Sept. 1660 he nominated as his deputy Walrond, who was apparently already one of the commissioners for the government of the island and president of the assembly. His son John, secretary to Willoughby, arrived with his father's commission on 17 December; Sir Thomas Modyford thereupon surrendered his post, and Charles II was proclaimed on the 20th. Walrond governed the island during Willoughby's absence for three years; according to Schomburgk, his administration gave general satisfaction, "numerous laws which tended to the prosperity of the island were passed", the court of common pleas and highway commissioners were established, and other reforms carried out (Hist. of Barbados, p. 286). He was, however, inclined to resent interference from England, and practically demanded that Charles should only make appointments on his recommendation. He complained of the injury the navigation acts did to Barbados, and, in view of the planters' embarrassments, prohibited merchants from suing them for debt, while his arbitrary conduct brought him frequently into collision with the assembly. Thus, when Willoughby arrived in August 1663 to assume the government, his first act was to remove Walrond. On 19 October he issued a warrant for his imprisonment until he should account for sums he had received as president from the Spaniards in return for trading facilities; he also appropriated Walrond's house as his official residence. Walrond refused to submit, and on 4 November Willoughby proclaimed him as "riding from place to place with his servants, armed, and inciting to mutiny and rebellion". This attempt at revolt failed, but Walrond escaped from Barbados and appealed to Charles in council. There "being surprised with new matter which he could not suddenly answer, an order was made for his commitment; but he having contracted debts by his loyalty to at least £30,000, withdrew out of the kingdom, not to avoid his majesty's justice, but to prevent his ruin by the violent persecutions of his creditors" His wife petitioned for a reversal of his commitment on 8 April 1668, with what result is not known. Probably he again took refuge in some of the West Indies under Spanish rule, where he appears to have died not long afterwards.

Walrond was instrumental in the passage of the Barbados Slave Code.

== Descendants ==
Walrond's eldest son, George, lost an arm fighting for Charles I, succeeded to his father's Spanish titles, and died in Barbados in 1688, leaving issue; his descendants were long prominent in Antigua. The second son, John, was secretary to Lord Willoughby. The third son, Colonel Thomas Walrond, became successively speaker of the House of Assembly, chief justice of the court of common pleas, and governor of Barbados; his will was proved at Barbados on 3 March 1693; his son, Sir Alexander Walrond, was also a prominent politician in Barbados, and his daughter Frances married the esteemed William Adams of Barbados in 1697.
