= Henry Willoughby, 4th Baron Willoughby of Parham =

English peer

Henry Willoughby, 4th Baron Willoughby of Parham (1612–1617) was an English peer of the House of Lords.

He was born in about November 1612, the son of William Willoughby, 3rd Baron Willoughby of Parham, and Frances Manners, daughter of John Manners, 4th Earl of Rutland. On the death of his father in 1617, he succeeded as the 4th Baron Willoughby of Parham. However, he did not enjoy the title long, dying in infancy on about 14 October 1617. The barony was succeeded by his brother, Francis Willoughby.

== Bibliography ==
- Burke, John (1831), A General and Heraldic Dictionary of the Peerage of England, Ireland and Scotland, London: Henry Colburn and Richard Bentley.

Peerage of England
Preceded by William Willoughby	Baron Willoughby of Parham; 1617	Succeeded by Francis Willoughby
