= Armada de Barlovento =

Former naval military formation of the Spanish Empire

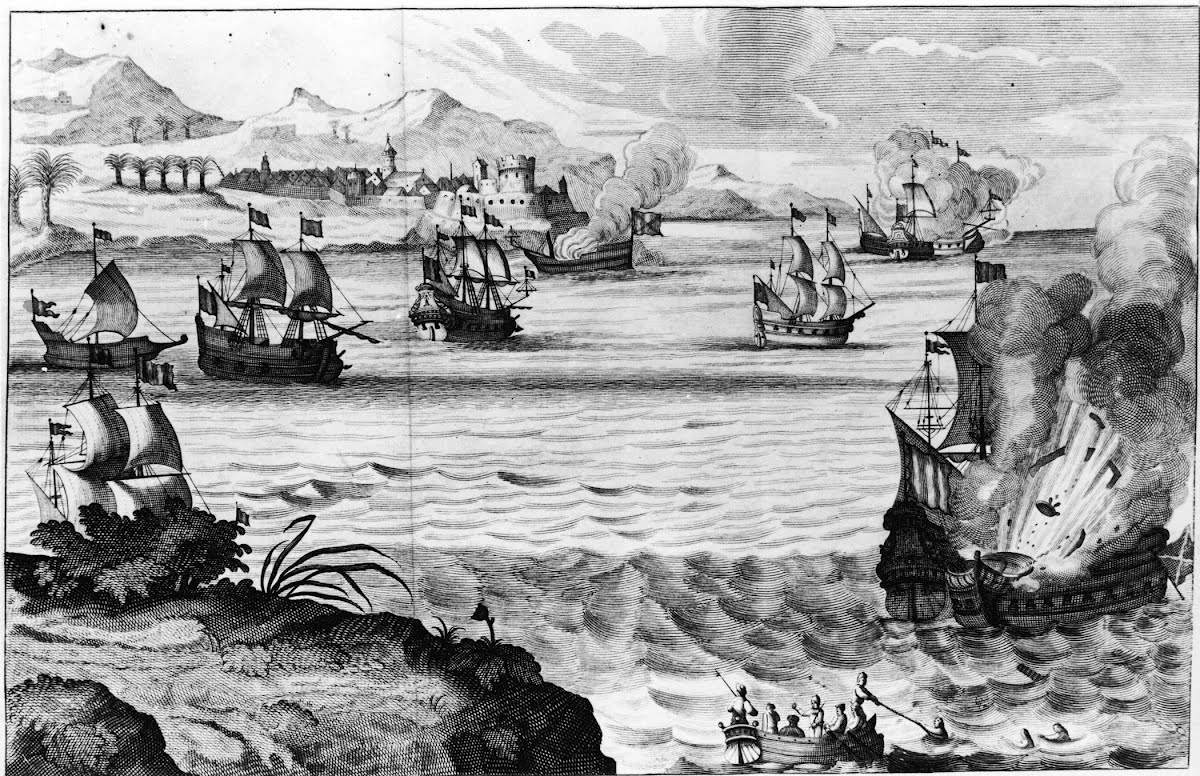
The Armada de Barlovento being destroyed during Henry Morgan's raid on Lake Maracaibo

The Armada de Barlovento (English: "Windward Fleet") was a naval force created by the Spanish Empire to protect its overseas American territories from attacks from rival European nations and pirates.

== History ==
In 1635, the Spanish crown decided to consolidate its naval power and safeguard its ocean trade between Spain and the Spanish territories overseas. This was done in order to counter the English and French corsairs who preyed on the Spanish treasure fleet. They proposed to create a series of strategic bases between the Bahamas and the Antilles and the creation of an associated armada. Towards this purposes, they ordered the creation of new warships. One notable action was the destruction of the fleet during Henry Morgan's raid on Lake Maracaibo in 1669. By the end of the century however the Spanish had built several small flotillas.

Already in the 17th century, prior to the increase in piracy in the Caribbean, Spain had formed a large armada, at considerable economic cost, paid for in part by new taxes in the Indies. The armada was important to Spanish politics in America, playing a crucial defensive and logistical role. In particular it protected the trade and the coasts of the Spanish territories in America, as they were coveted by other European powers.

The Armada de Barlovento was dissolved in 1748.

== See also ==
- Guarda costa
