= Edward Collier (pirate) =

English pirate

Edward Collier was an English buccaneer who served as Sir Henry Morgan's second-in-command throughout much of his expeditions against Spain during the mid-17th century.

In command of one of the ships which took part in Sir Henry Morgan's raid on Portobello in 1668, he was given command of the 34-gun Oxford with a commission as a pirate hunter before the end of the year and eventually captured Captain la Veven and his ship, the Satisfaction.

Rejoining Morgan in his later raids on Maracaibo and Gibraltar, an explosion aboard his ship would kill many of the officers in the expedition before his ship was sunk. Reportedly despondent over the loss of his ship, Collier left the fleet and was allowed to take command of the Satisfaction spending the next 18 months off the Mexican coastline.

Eventually he was persuaded to join Morgan as he was planning his raid on Panama September 1670 and appointed vice-admiral of the expedition. As the expedition was being prepared, Collier was ordered to sail with six ship to Venezuela to obtain provisions and other supply as well as to gather information from locals.

Arriving at Rio de la Hacha, he captured the Spanish stronghold and reportedly tortured his captives to reveal where the city's 200,000 pesos were located at. However, many of the prisoners died in captivity without revealing the whereabouts of the city's treasury and, after demanding provisions from the local population, Collier left Rio de la Hacha and rejoined Morgan's fleet in early December.

At the time of their arrival at Panama in January 1671, Collier successfully led the left wing of the assault to capture the town. Proceeding to loot the town, Collier (or one of the pirates under his command) murdered a Franciscan friar before their return to Port Royal.

The raid on Panama led to the arrest of Morgan after his arrival in Port Royal. Morgan was later released, and neither Collier nor anyone else seemed to be subject to arrest by colonial authorities. He later became a wealthy gentleman farmer retiring to his 1,000-acre (4.0 km^{2}) plantation in Jamaica, presented to him in 1668. He would spend his later years preparing defenses against a possible foreign invasion against Jamaica until his death.
