= Francis Willoughby, 5th Baron Willoughby of Parham =

English peer

The Right Honourable The Lord Willoughby of Parham

Governor of Barbados
- In office 1650–1651
- Preceded by: Philip Bell
- Succeeded by: George Ayscue
- In office 1663–1666
- Preceded by: Humphrey Walrond (acting)
- Succeeded by: Henry Willoughby (acting)

Personal details
- Born: c. 1605
- Died: 23 July 1666 (aged 60–61)
- Occupation: Peer
- Known for: Governor of Barbados

Francis Willoughby, 5th Baron Willoughby of Parham (baptised 1614; died 23 July 1666 O.S., 2 August 1666 N.S.) was an English peer of the House of Lords.

He succeeded to the title on 14 October 1617 on the death in infancy of his elder brother Henry Willoughby, 4th Lord Willoughby of Parham. Francis Willoughby was the second son of William Willoughby, 3rd Lord Willoughby of Parham The young and unexpected death of his elder brother Henry made Francis successor to the hereditary peerage and seat in the House of Lords, the upper house of Parliament. Francis Willoughby was an early supporter of the Parliamentarian cause during the English Civil War but later became a Royalist. He twice served as governor of English colonies in the Caribbean. Francis Willoughby died without male heirs of his body and the title passed to his younger brother William Willoughby, 6th Lord Willoughby of Parham, the third son of William Willoughby, 3rd Lord Willoughby of Parham.

== Background ==
Francis Willoughby was born in perhaps late 1613 (since he was baptised in 1614) to William Willoughby, 3rd Baron Willoughby of Parham and Frances Manners, daughter of John Manners, 4th Earl of Rutland of Nottingham at Parham in Suffolk. His father died in 1617, and the barony was held by his older brother Henry for one year until he too died barely five years old, at which point Francis inherited the seat in the House of Lords and with it the family title.

As tensions between the king and Parliament grew in the 1630s, he found himself opposed to Charles I over the levying of ship money. His loyalty was further strained by the Bishops' Wars, in which he was reluctant to fight the Scots.

== Parliamentary Commander ==
When the king in 1642 issued his Commission of Array to form a loyal army, Willoughby rejected his summons and instead took command of a horse regiment under the Parliamentary commander, the Earl of Essex. By January 1643, he was made commander-in-chief of Lincolnshire.

On 16 July of the same year, he led his soldiers in a surprise attack on Gainsborough where he seized the town. Facing a counterattack, Willoughby's soldiers fought along with those under Oliver Cromwell to hold off an advancing Royalist force of superior strength. The main body of the Parliamentary army withdrew to Boston with only two dead.

That September, Willoughby was a subordinate commander under the Earl of Manchester and Cromwell. He fought at the Battle of Winceby and accepted the surrender of Bolingbroke Castle in November.

Willoughby's relations with the Parliamentarians began to fray in 1644. In March he joined with Sir John Meldrum in the assault on Newark, the failure of which has been partially attributed to Willoughby's supposed unwillingness to take orders from Meldrum. Willoughby quarrelled with Manchester and was forced to make an apology to the House of Lords as a result. Furthermore, Cromwell himself saw fit to complain about the conduct of Willoughby's soldiers.

In the next few years, Willoughby became the leader of the Presbyterian force within Parliament, opposed the formation of the New Model Army and was elected as speaker of the House of Lords in July 1647. However, when the Parliamentary army took London in September, Willoughby was imprisoned along with six other peers and held for four months at which point he was released without charge, fleeing to the Netherlands to join the Royalists.

== Royalist Supporter ==
Now espousing the Royalist cause, Willoughby was promoted to Vice Admiral under the Duke of York, an appointment that may have been designed to engender sympathy among Scots and Presbyterians. He was also assigned a command in the 1648 invasion of England under the Prince of Wales. He later surrendered his naval command to Prince Rupert of the Rhine. When Parliament confiscated his estates, he travelled to the Caribbean.

He was appointed Governor of Barbados by Charles II. He arrived at Barbados and took up the appointment in May 1650 and attempted to negotiate the strained politics of that island, which also experienced a division between Royalists and Parliamentarians. During this time he also sent a small colonizing party led by Major Anthony Rowse to Suriname, which established a colony there. Fort Willoughby, which had been an abandoned French outpost, was expanded at the present-day site of the city of Paramaribo).

On 25 October 1651, a seven-ship force under Commodore George Ayscue arrived off Barbados, demanding that the island submit "for the use of the Parliament of England". Willoughby's reply (tellingly addressed to "His Majesty's ship Rainbow") was unyielding, declaring that he knew "no supreme authority over Englishmen but the King". With some 400 horsemen and 6,000 militia, he was prepared to resist any attempt at coercion.

Over the next month, Barbados was blockaded. In early December, with the Royalist cause defeated in England, Ayscue began a series of raids against fortifications on the island and was reinforced by a group of thirteen ships bound for Virginia. On 17 December a force of more than 1,000 Barbadian militia was defeated by one of Ayscue's detachments. Governor Willoughby attempted to stem the spread of Parliamentary sympathies by hanging two of the returning militia soldiers and prohibiting the reading of documents from the blockading fleet. The Royalists held out for several more weeks until one of Willoughby's own commanders declared himself for Parliament. A battle was averted by a week of rain, after which Willoughby, perhaps having seen the hopelessness of his cause, sought negotiations. He was replaced as governor but Barbados and the Royalists there were not punished. Additionally, Willoughby's properties in England were restored. He returned to them in August 1652.

== Later years ==
While he was twice imprisoned during The Protectorate for involvement in Royalist intrigues, Willoughby survived the Cromwell years and after the Restoration in 1660 he was again appointed to a governorship in the Caribbean, administering the colonies at Saint Kitts, Nevis, Montserrat, and Antigua.

In June 1664 he organised an expedition from Barbados against the small French garrison at Saint Lucia, expelling it under the pretext that a half-Carib native had effectively "sold" it to England and establishing a short-lived English colony there.

During the Second Anglo-Dutch War, Willoughby organised Barbados' defences and managed to repel a Dutch fleet led by Michiel de Ruyter in April 1665. Three months later Willoughby engaged in another expedition, sailing to the Dutch island of Tobago. Finding a force under the English privateer Robert Searle already looting the settlement there, he put a stop to the destruction and installed a garrison of fifty men to maintain order.

His last act on behalf of the English crown came in July 1666 when, having learned of the recent French seizure of Saint Kitts, he formed a relief force of two Royal Navy frigates, twelve other large vessels (including commandeered merchant ships), a fire ship, and a ketch, bearing over 1,000 men. He planned to proceed north to Nevis, Montserrat, and Antigua to gather further reinforcements before descending on the French. Leaving Barbados on 28 July (18 July O.S.), his force prowled off Martinique and then Guadeloupe, where he sent a frigate to assault the harbour and capture two merchant vessels on 2 August. This success could not be exploited however as that night most of his force was destroyed by a strong hurricane, including the flagship Hope, from which Willoughby did not emerge.

== Marriage and issue ==
On 16 November 1628 Willoughby married Elizabeth Cecil (1606–1661), the daughter of the soldier Edward Cecil, 1st Viscount Wimbledon and Theodosia Noel.

Francis Willoughby and Elizabeth Cecil had four children:

1. Diana, married 21 May 1645 Heneage Finch, 3rd Earl of Winchilsea
2. Frances Willoughby (1625 – September 1680) married William Brereton, 3rd Baron Brereton
3. Elizabeth Willoughby (born about 1633 – 1 August 1695) married 28 October 1662 Richard Jones, 1st Earl of Ranelagh
4. William Willoughby (born about 1635); died young and unmarried in his father's lifetime

== Legacy ==
Willoughby died on 2 August 1666 (23 July O.S.), at sea on board his ship Hope, in a hurricane off Guadeloupe.

In his will, he left extensive holdings in Barbados, Antigua, and Suriname to his children and his nephew Henry Willoughby as well as smaller grants of currency or sugar to various associates and servants. He named his daughter Elizabeth as his executrix.

== Notes ==
Peerage of England
Preceded by Henry Willoughby	Baron Willoughby of Parham; 1617–1666	Succeeded by William Willoughby
