= Henry Willoughby (colonial administrator) =

English military officer

Henry Willoughby (1640–1669) was an English military officer, the Governor of Barbados (1664–1666) and Antigua (1667–1670).

He was the fifth son of William Willoughby, 6th Baron Willoughby of Parham.
