= Henry Hawley (colonial administrator) =

English colonial administrator

Henry Hawley was the English Governor of Barbados from 1630 to 1639/40.

== Background ==
Henry Hawley was the younger son of James Hawley, who held the lease for Brentford Market in Middlesex and, until 1622, the lease for Boston Manor nearby. James Hawley was a mercer also trained at the Middle Temple, one of the Inns of Court.

Hawley himself served a mercer's apprenticeship at the Three Cranes Tavern in London. Almost all of his siblings embarked on colonisation in the New World; one exception was his younger brother Gabriel, who left his draper's apprenticeship to serve in 1622 his mercer uncle Henry Hawley, who newly appointed as the English East India Company's chief merchant in the East Indies.

Hawley's brother, James, had served his mercer's apprenticeship with his uncle Henry Hawley and may have settled in Virginia. Hawley appointed his brother William to colonise and govern St. Croix, one of the Virgin Islands, but the islands were taken over by the Spanish.

Hawley's sister Susan, married Richard Peers, another planter, and in Hawley's absence, the acting deputy governor. In addition, he was also brother in law of Richard Ashcraft (1590–1600).

Hawley's eldest brother, Jerome, was one of eight investors in the founding of Maryland colony and served in the colony's General Assembly.

== Governor of Barbados ==
As Captain Henry Hawley, he was appointed governor of Barbados in 1630, arriving in June that year initially in the capacity of Commissioner to James Hay, 1st Earl of Carlisle. After a struggle over patents with Sir William Courten, Hay had emerged as the proprietor of the island. He died heavily in debt in 1636 and, for the minority of his son, trustees were appointed to administer his estate. They made onerous tax demands on Barbados to settle the Hay family debts. Hawley enforced high taxes and tariffs, at a cost of damage to trade.

Modern historians, such as Larry Dale Gragg and Mathew Parker have noted that Governor Henry Hawley's rule of the island was deeply unpopular, noting that he "was universally held to be a tyrant" and a "drunkard". Some historians have argued that he brought in the first ever slave code in Barbados in 1636 which stipulated that Black slaves brought to Barbados to be sold should be enslaved for life, although some doubt it ever existed. Darryll Clarke, author of Governor Henry Hawley and the 1636 Slave Code makes the case for its existence and points out that this slave code is central to historiographical understanding of the history of slavery in the West Indies. The first official slave code in Barbados was introduced in 1661 by the colonial legislature.
