= Thomas Modyford =

British Baronet

Sir Thomas (Tomos) Modyford Bt

Governor of Jamaica
- In office February 1664 – 1 July 1671
- Preceded by: Edward Morgan
- Succeeded by: Thomas Lynch

Personal details
- Born: 1620 Wales
- Died: 1 September 1679 (aged 58–59) Spanish Town, Jamaica
- Spouse: Elizabeth Palmer (m. 1640; died 1668)

Colonel Sir Thomas Modyford, 1st Baronet (c. 1620 – 1 September 1679) was a planter of Barbados and Governor of Jamaica from 1664 to 1671.

== Early life ==
Modyford was the son of a mayor of Exeter with family connections to the Duke of Albemarle.

== Barbados ==
Modyford emigrated to Barbados as a young man with other family members in 1647, in the opening stages of the English Civil War. He had £1,000 for a down payment on a plantation and £6,000 to commit in the next three years. Modyford soon was dominant in Barbados island politics, rising to be speaker of the House of Assembly in Barbados during the reign of King Charles II, and factor for the Royal Adventurers Trading to Africa, who had a monopoly in the slave trade to the islands.

By 1647, Modyford had made a fortune from sugar and slavery. In 1651, Modyford sided with the Cavaliers under Lord Francis Willoughby, 5th Baron Willoughby of Parham, as they defied Oliver Cromwell, but when a force was despatched under the command of Sir George Ayscue, Modyford switched sides, deserting Willoughby and his royalist forces. In 1660, he negotiated with the Commissioners of the Commonwealth to be governor of Barbados, which put him in an awkward position with the Restoration of the English monarchy.

== Jamaica ==
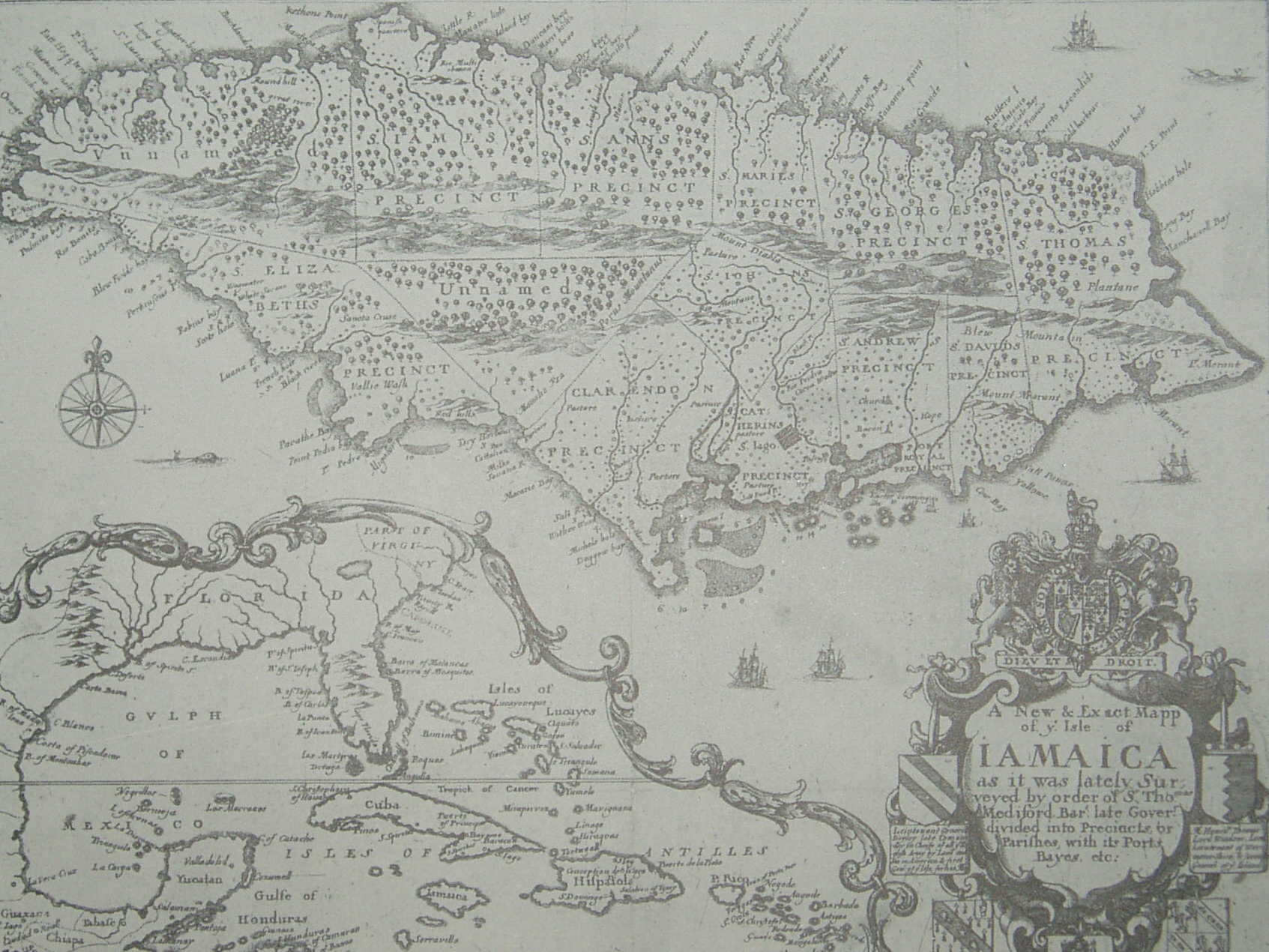
1671 map by Richard Bloome, completed on the instructions of Modyford

Sir Thomas Modyford was appointed Governor of Jamaica, by commission dated 15 February 1664 and made a Baronet. He arrived in Jamaica 4 June 1664, with seven hundred planters and their slaves, marking the wholesale introduction of a slavery-based plantation economy in Jamaica. The move was marked by tragedy for Modyford however, whose eldest son John was lost at sea when returning for his mother in Barbados.

But it was not long before Modyford took tight control of the Jamaican government by culling the council and filling it with his own supporters, including his brother, Col. Sir James Modyford, whom he made Lieutenant-Governor of Jamaica, Governor of the Town and Castle of Port Royal and sole judge of the Admiralty and Customs. Thomas Modyford remained a factor for the Royal Adventurers until 1669, overseeing their plantation in Jamaica whilst Sir James was granted a royal licence in November to ship convicted felons from England to his brother in Jamaica. In Jamaica Sir Thomas used a labour force of twenty-eight indentured servants from England, and a large number of African slaves.

It was also under Thomas Modyford that the island was first divided into parishes. His own cacao plantation at Sixteen Mile Walk was located in St. Katherine's parish. However, these plantations came under regular attacks from Jamaican Maroons. In the second half of the 1660s, Modyford waged war against the Karmahaly Maroons, led by Juan de Serras, but the governor failed to subdue this community of runaway slaves.

In 1670 he was "Governor of His Majesty's Island of Jamaica Commander-in-Chief of all His Majesties Forces within the said Island and in the Islands adjacent Vice-Admiral to His Royal Highness the Duke of York in the American Seas", according to the commission to Henry Morgan to make war upon the Spanish. The issuance of the aforementioned privateer commission to Morgan, who used it to attack and plunder the Spanish possession of Panama, resulted in revocation of Modyford's governorship and arrest in 1671. King Charles II of England, in desperate need of Spain as an ally in an impending war with the Dutch, had ordered the arrest and revocation merely to appease a Spanish Crown, furious over the destruction of their prize city. Though charges were never preferred, and no trial was ever held, Modyford spent two years in the Tower of London. He was released in 1674, and returned to Jamaica in 1675.

== Death ==
Modyford died on 1 September 1679. He was buried the next day at the cathedral in Spanish Town, Jamaica alongside his wife, Elizabeth.

At his death, Modyford owned one of the largest plantations in the West Indies, with over 600 African slaves and white indentured servants.

Government offices
Preceded by Daniel Searle, acting	Governor of Barbados, acting 1660	Succeeded by Humphrey Walrond, acting
Preceded by Edward Morgan	Deputy Governor of Jamaica; 1664–1671	Succeeded by Thomas Lynch as Lieutenant Governor of Jamaica
Baronetage of England
New creation	Baronet (of Lincoln's Inn); 1664–1679	Succeeded by Thomas Modyford
