= William Berners (property developer) =

English property developer and slave owner (1709–1783)

- Born: 10 July 1709; Much Hadham, Hertfordshire
- Died: 13 September 1783 (aged 74)

William Berners (10 July 1709 - 13 September 1783) was an English property developer and slave owner in the 18th century. He is particularly associated with the development of the Fitzrovia area north of Oxford Street in central London; Berners Street was named after him.

== Life ==
William Berners was born in 1709, a son of William Berners and Elizabeth Rawworth, in Much Hadham, Hertfordshire.

William Berners snr was a grandson of Josias Berners, a Clerkenwell resident and lawyer who had interests in the New River Company and bought land in a district then known as Newlands west of the City of London. Josias' son James and William snr (who died in 1712, when William jnr was an infant) undertook some development of the area during the late 17th century.

Once William Berners came of age, he was able to start developing land which had hitherto been used for gardening. In 1738 he made an agreement with a Thomas Huddle to develop an area measuring 655 ft long by 100 ft deep fronting on to Oxford Street. Initially, three streets - Newman, Berners and Wells Streets - were created.

After earlier piecemeal development, Berners undertook systematic development of what is now Fitzrovia between 1758 and 1772. Concerted development of the Berners estate included the creation of Charles and Suffolk (now Nassau) Streets and various mews between the main north–south streets.

Through his marriage to Mary Bendysh, he became a co-owner of the Wagwater estate in St Mary, Jamaica in 1760.

In 1767, Berners, together with his brother Henry, inherited estates in Norfolk, Suffolk, Middlesex, Essex and Buckinghamshire from Charles Gostlin, his mother's cousin. The brothers erected a monument to Charles Gostlin at Morningthorpe Church in Norfolk, expressing gratitude for their inheritance.

The inheritance included Gostlin's estate at Hanwell Park in Middlesex. William Berners wanted to demolish the barns and cottages in front of Hanwell Park that were blocking his view. To acquire the land on containing the buildings, he proposed a land swap with the landowners, the Charity of William Hobbayne, of which his brother Henry was a trustee. A meeting of the charity's trustees on 15 June 1771 recorded:

“Mr Berners is very desirous to have the cottage and barns belonging to this Trust situated in front of his house moved to some other place, as being an obstruction to his view and an obstacle to his improvements.”

The land swap was secured by an Act of Parliament in 1775, sponsored by fellow slaveowner and Charity of William Hobbayne Trustee Nathaniel Bayly, MP for Westbury.

Berners acquired extensive landholdings on the Shotley Peninsula south of Ipswich in Suffolk and commissioned Leicestershire architect John Johnson to design a fashionable gentleman's country residence, Woolverstone Hall, in 1776. Johnson had previously designed various buildings for Berners in London.
