= Otram River =

Coordinates: 18°22′N 76°54′W

Location
- Country: Jamaica

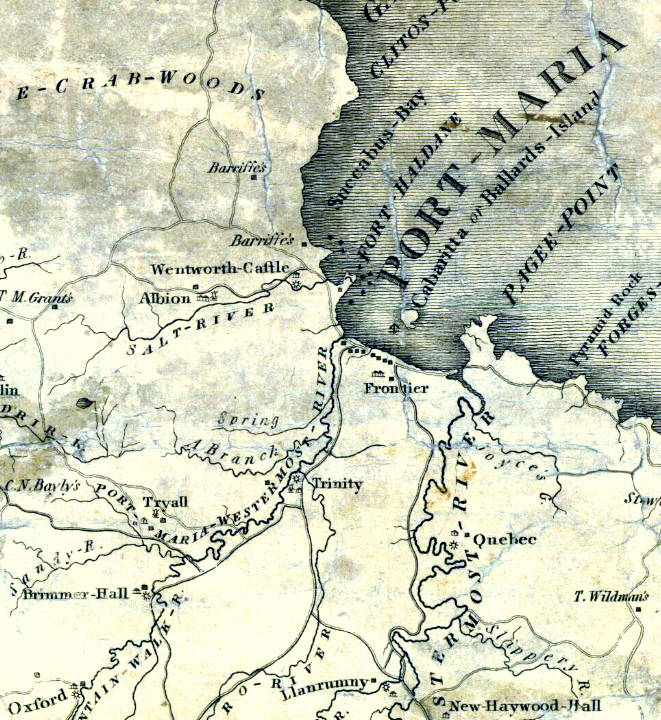
"Port Maria Westernmost River" (centre) on James Robertson's map of 1804

The Otram River, formerly known as the Port Maria River or the Port Maria Western River, is a river in Saint Mary Parish, Jamaica. It reaches the sea in the parish capital of Port Maria and contributes to flooding in that town.

It is joined at Trinity by the Negro River, where an aqueduct, completed in 1797, and over a mile's length once drew water from the Otram river to supply the Trinity sugar plantation.

== See also ==
- List of rivers of Jamaica
- Paggee River
