= Tacky's Revolt =

1760 slave rebellion in British Jamaica

- Part of the Seven Years' War
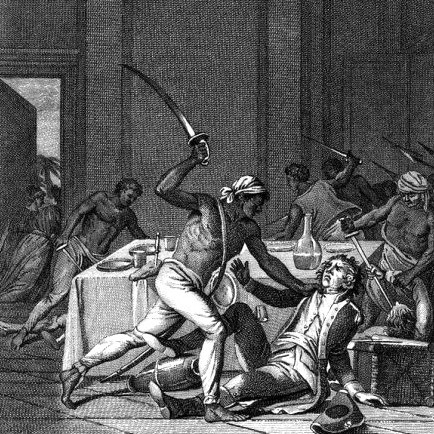
- A French illustration of the revolt made in 1800
Date	7 April 1760 – Late 1761
Location	Colony of Jamaica
Result	Revolt suppressed

Belligerents
Great Britain; Colony of Jamaica; Jamaican Maroons	Jamaican Cromanty

Commanders and leaders
Robert Spragge; William Hynes; Hugh Forsyth; Charles Swigle	Tacky †; Apongo; Cubah; Simon

Strength
Unknown	Hundreds

Casualties and losses
60 whites killed 60 free blacks killed	1,100+ rebels killed 500+ rebels sold into slavery

Tacky's Revolt (also known as Tacky's Rebellion and Tacky's War) was a slave rebellion in the British colony of Jamaica which lasted from 7 April 1760 to 1761. Spearheaded by self-emancipated Coromantee people, the rebels were led by a Fante royal named Tacky. It was the most significant slave rebellion in the West Indies between the 1733 slave insurrection on St. John and the 1791 Haitian Revolution. The rebels were eventually defeated after British colonial forces, assisted by Jamaican Maroons, waged a gruelling counterinsurgency campaign. According to historian Trevor Burnard, "[in] terms of its shock to the imperial system, only the American Revolution surpassed Tacky's War in the eighteenth century." It was also the largest slave rebellion in the British West Indies until the Baptist War of 1831, which also occurred in Jamaica.

== Background ==
The island of Jamaica had been under British colonial rule since the 1655 invasion of Jamaica. British colonists soon established a plantation economy on the island dependent on the forced labour of African slaves imported via the Atlantic slave trade. In 1739, Charles Leslie wrote that, "No Country excels [Jamaica] in a barbarous Treatment of Slaves, or in the cruel Methods they put them to Death." Tacky (leader of the rebellion) was originally from the Fante ethnic group in West Africa and had been a paramount chief in Eguaafo (in the Central region of present-day Ghana) before being taken captive by the Dutch. He and his lieutenants planned to take over Jamaica from the British, and to create a free and independent state. The uprising was inspired by the successful resistance of Free black people in Jamaica, such as the Queen Nanny during the First Maroon War of the 1730s.

Before taken captive, Tacky was king of his village. He recalled selling prisoners of war of his rivals of the Ashanti, Nzema and Ahanta, off into slavery as spoils of war to British slave traders. He was himself taken captive when a rival state and the Dutch defeated his army in battle near Elmina and sold him into slavery, and he ended up in Jamaica. J. A. Jones, who claimed to have met him while being held captive by Tacky while trying to get an interview with him, wrote in his memoirs that Tacky spoke English fluently (as was common in the ruling class of Fantes at the time). Also according to Jones, Tacky was discovered in a cave a year before the rebellion took place, planning with his comrades: Quaw Badu (Yaw Badu), Sang (Osei), Sobadou, Fula Jati and Quantee (Kwantwi). The liberation movement was a coordinated island-wide conspiracy, led by a secret network of Coromantee.

== Revolt ==
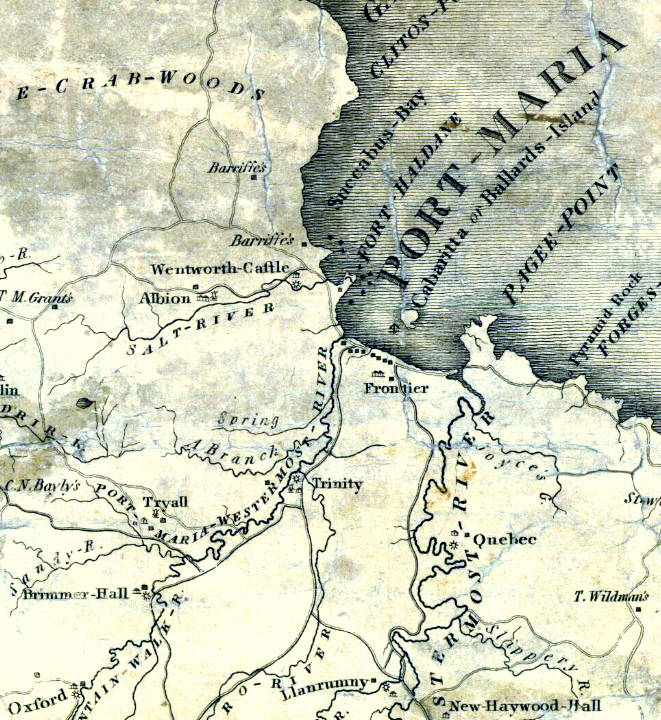
Frontier Estate on map by James Robertson, 1804

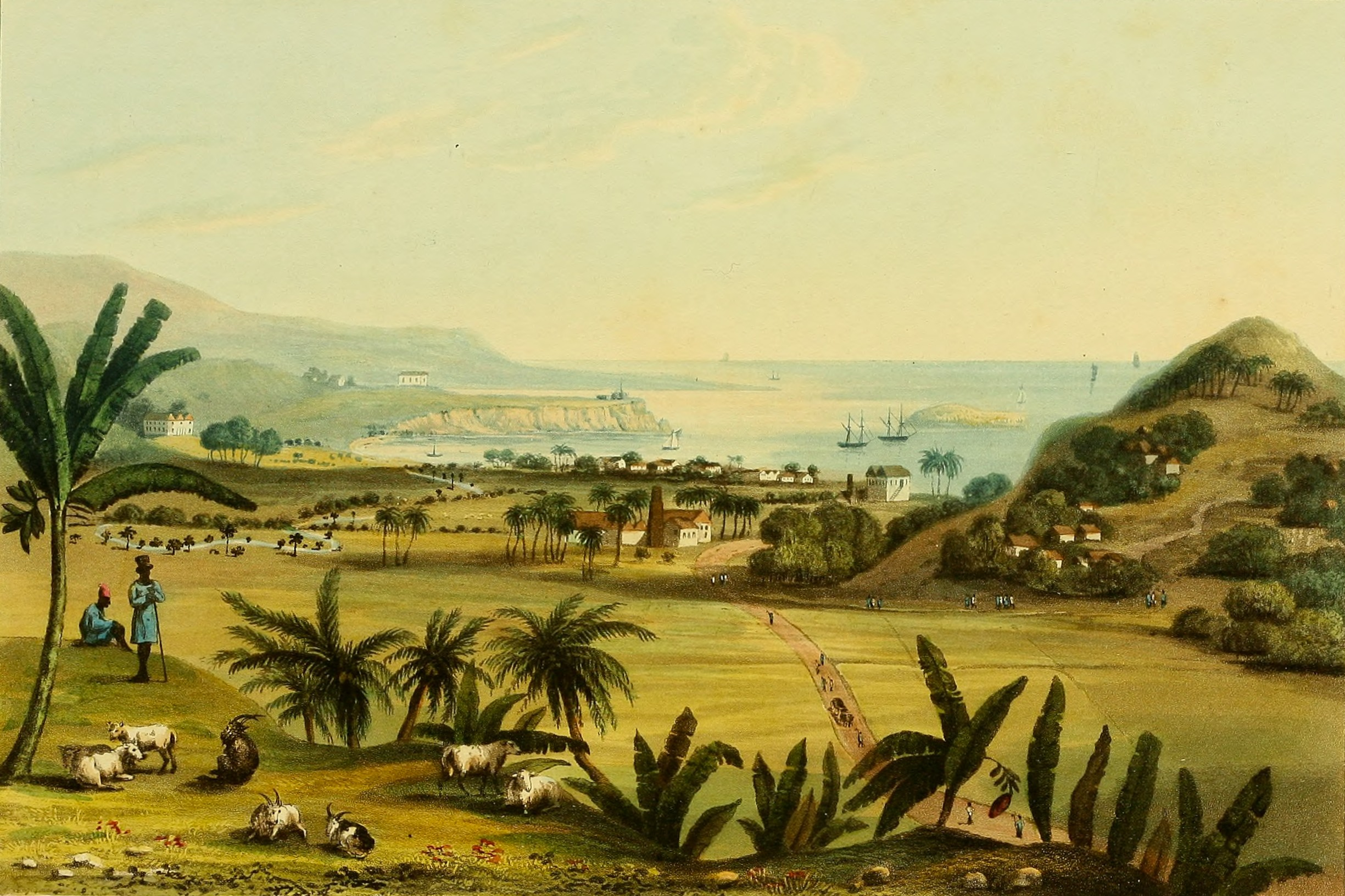
Frontier Estate

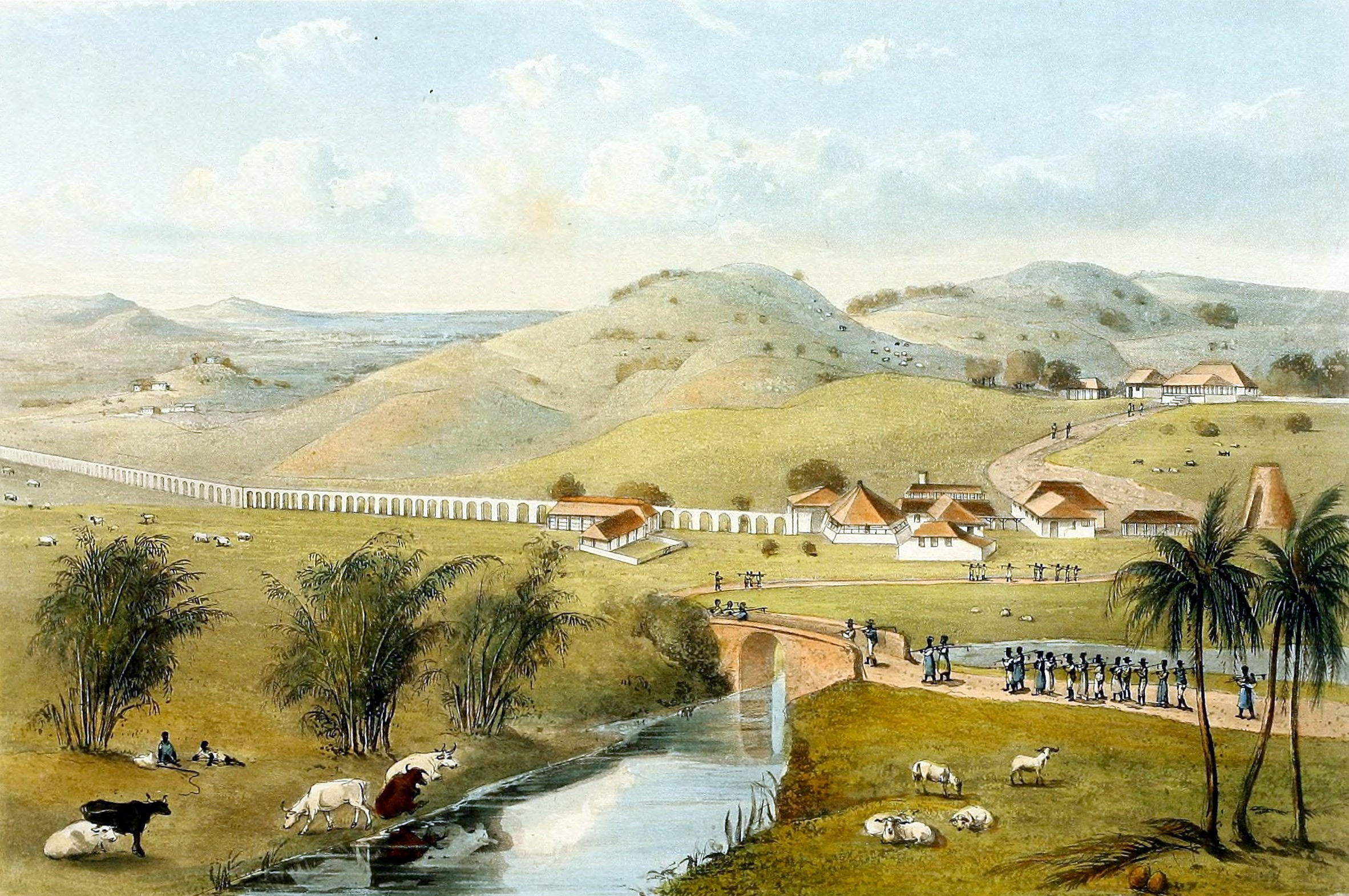
Trinity plantation, one of the first to be captured by the rebels

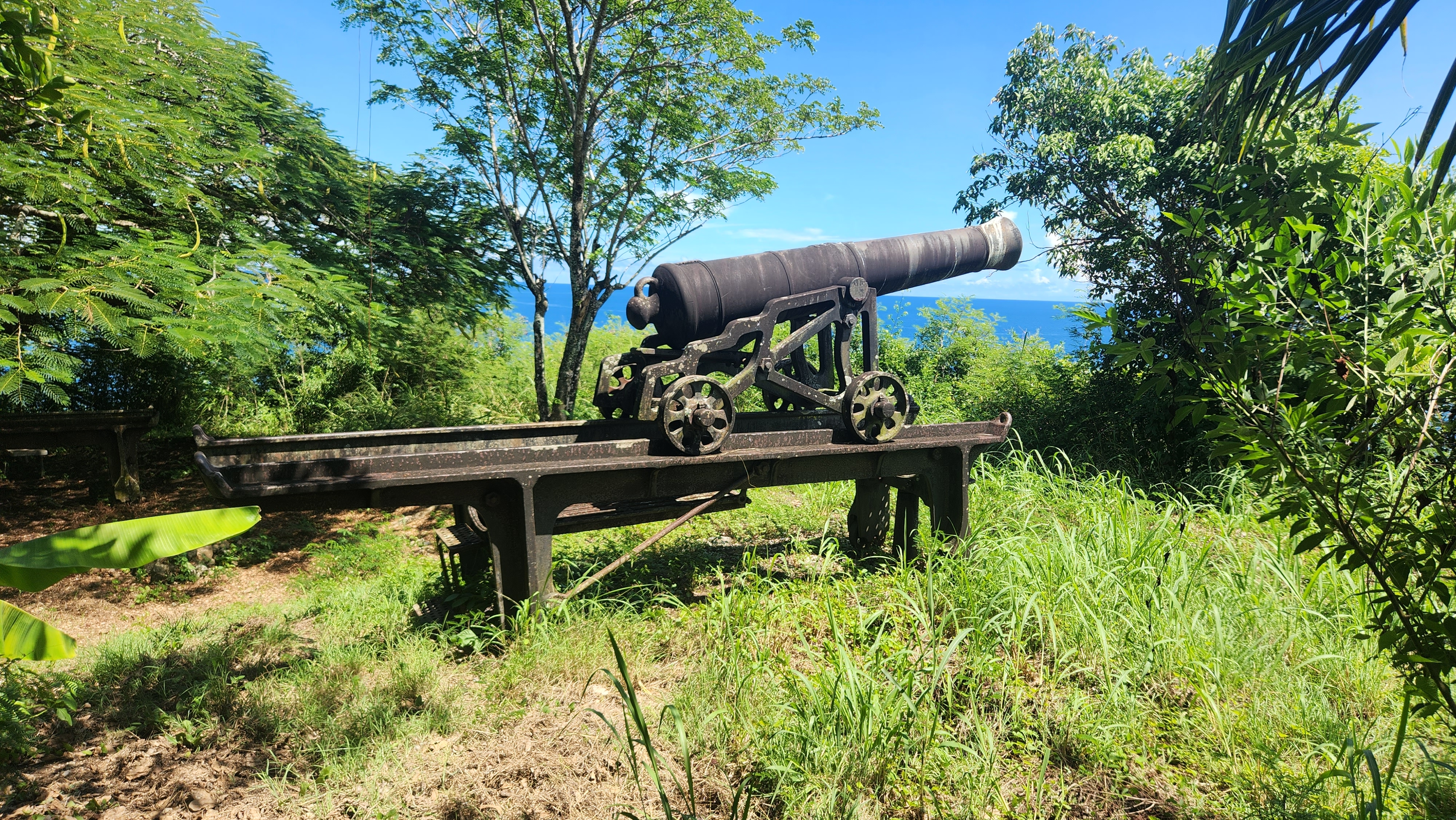
Turntable Cannon at Fort Haldane

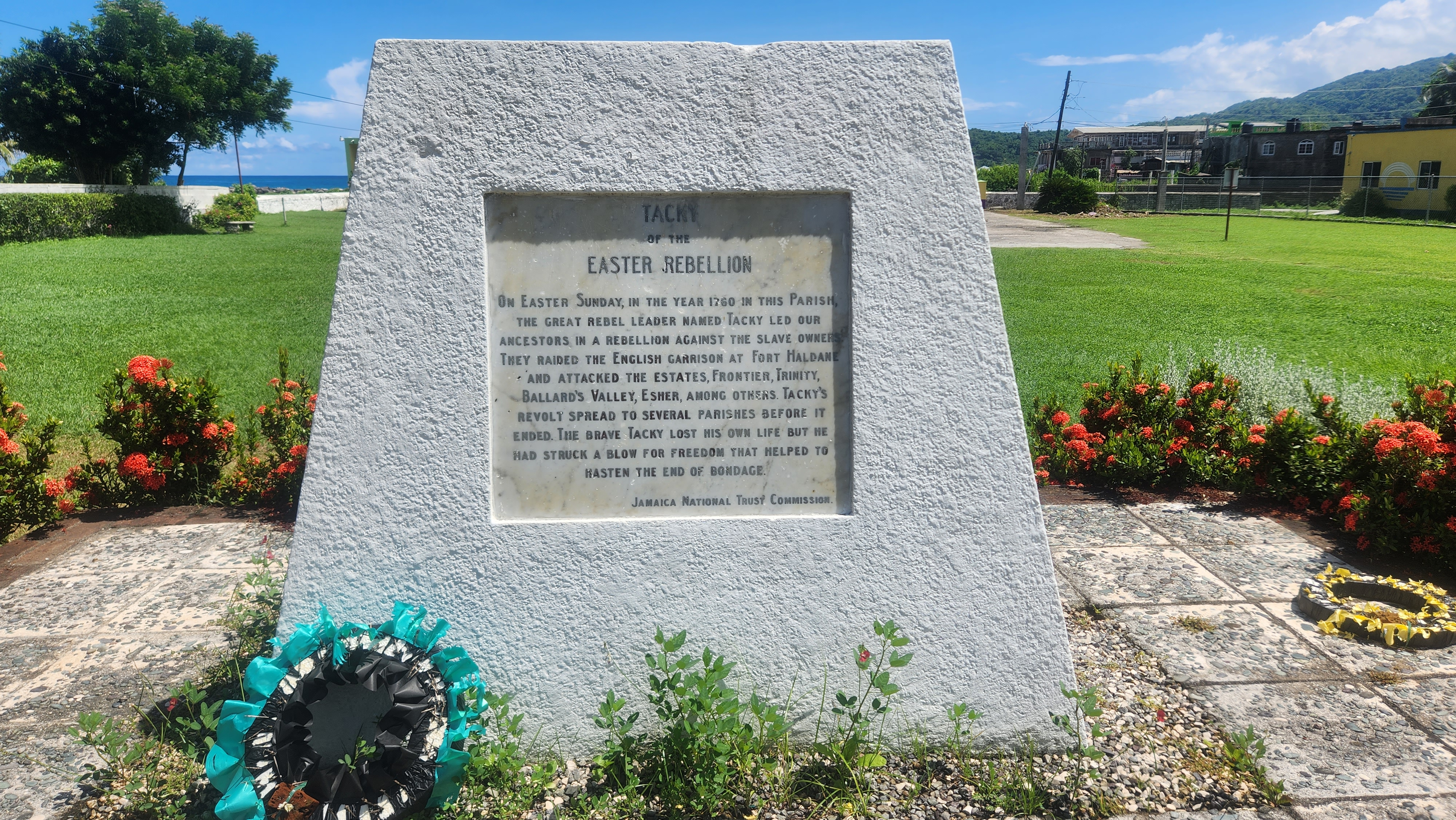
Easter Revolt memorial to Tacky

Some time before daybreak on Easter Monday, 7 April 1760, Tacky and his followers who all had extensive military training began the revolt and easily took over the Frontier and Trinity plantations, killing some of the white overseers who worked there. However, Zachary Bayly, who owned Trinity, was not among those killed by the rebels. Rebellions also broke out on the Esher estate owned by the wealthy William Beckford and the rebels soon joined Tacky's forces. Bolstered by their easy success, they made their way to the storeroom at Fort Haldane where the munitions to defend the town of Port Maria were kept. After killing the storekeeper, Tacky and his men commandeered nearly 4 barrels of gunpowder and 40 firearms with shot, before marching on to overrun the plantations at Heywood Hall and Esher.

By dawn, hundreds of other now formerly rebels had joined Tacky and his followers. At Ballard's Valley, the self-liberated Africans stopped to rejoice in their success. One person from Esher decided to slip away and sound the alarm. Obeahmen (Caribbean "witch doctors") quickly circulated around the camp dispensing a powder that they claimed would protect the men from injury in battle and loudly proclaimed that an Obeahman could not be killed. Confidence was high. On 9 April, Lieutenant Governor Sir Henry Moore, 1st Baronet dispatched a detachment of the 74th regiment, comprising between 70 and 80 mounted militia from Spanish Town to Saint Mary Parish, Jamaica. These militia soldiers were joined by Maroons from Moore Town, Charles Town and Scott's Hall, who were bound by treaty and forced to suppress such rebellions. The Maroon contingents were commanded by Moore Town's white superintendent Charles Swigle, and the Maroon officers reporting to him were Clash and Sambo from Moore Town, Quaco and Cain from Charles Town, and Cudjo and Davy the Maroon from Scott's Hall. Tacky's militia burnt houses at Down's Cove in coastal St Mary. On 12 April, a detachment of the Jamaica Militia led by Captain Rigby and Lieutenant Forsyth arrived at Down's Cove, where they were met by Charles Town Maroons (who were still called Crawford's Town Maroons by the colonial writers) led by Swigle, and a contingent of black soldiers. Tacky's men attacked Forsyth's contingent, and killed a number of militia soldiers, losing only three people in the process. Tacky himself was reportedly wounded in the assault.

Captain William Hynes led his black regiment, and Swigle the Charles Town Maroons, in pursuit of Tacky through the forested mountains of the interior, and in "a rocky gully, between two steep Hills," defeated Tacky's men in a skirmish and captured a few of Tacky's soldiers. A day later, on 13 April, the Maroons continued their pursuit of Tacky's men through the woods near Friendship estate. When the Jamaica Militia learned of the Obeahman's boast of not being able to be killed, an Obeahman was captured, killed and hung with his mask, ornaments of teeth and bone and feather trimmings at a prominent place visible from the encampment of the self-liberated Africans. Many of them, confidence shaken, returned to their plantations. Tacky reportedly reluctantly agreed to fight on, with about 25 other men. On 14 April, other Maroon parties from Scott's Hall and Moore Town joined the Charles Town Maroons, and led by Swigle, they engaged Tacky's men in a battle in Rocky Valley, and routed them, defeating and killing a number of the men. Tacky and the remainder of his men went running through the woods being chased by the Maroons and their legendary marksman, Davy. While running at full speed, Davy shot Tacky and cut off his head as evidence of his feat, for which he would be richly rewarded. Tacky's head was later displayed on a pole in Spanish Town until a follower took it down in the middle of the night. The rest of Tacky's men were found in a cave near Tacky Falls, having committed suicide rather than going back to slavery.

Self-liberated Africans shaved their heads to signal the start of the uprising. On 25 May, the western movement started when self-liberated Africans under the command of Apongo rose up in revolt on the Masemure estate in Westmoreland. One of Apongo's lieutenants, Simon, fired the shot that killed Masemure's managing attorney, John Smith, and that signalled the start of the western movement. The self-liberated Africans had timed their rebellion to coincide with the departure of a naval escort from the bay of Bluefields, Jamaica, correctly assuming that security would be more lax at that time. Apongo later admitted that he had planned to attack the bay, but some of his lieutenants argued against an attack on the coast. Vincent Brown surmised that Simon may have been one of those lieutenants who preferred to fight on in the forested mountains.

Apongo's rebels were well-stocked in their attempts to resist counter-attacks from the militia and their Maroon allies. After the assault on the "Rebel's Barricade", the attackers found over 70 hogsheads of gunpowder, and mahogany chests full of clothes, ruffled shirts, laced hats, shoes, stockings and cravats, among the basic necessities. Refugees, both white and black, fled to the Westmoreland capital of Savanna-la-Mar and surrounding ports. The militia and Maroons counter-attacked with sporadic engagements, and in the process captured and killed a number of rebels. Many of those captured were summarily executed without trial. On 29 May, an attempt by the Westmoreland Militia to storm the rebels' barricaded encampment was soundly defeated and repelled. This success resulted in the rebels gaining more recruits by the day, and so demoralised the militia that they started to suffer from significant numbers of desertions.

Lieutenant Governor Moore once again declared martial law. A company of the 74th Regiment of Foot, which was quartered at Savanna-la-Mar, and two detachments of Maroons then joined the militia. On 1–2 June, bolstered by militia troops from two more western parishes, a detachment of British regulars and sailors, and the skilled Maroon warriors of Accompong Town, British colonial forces successfully stormed the barricade and drove the rebels there out following a two-hour battle, killing and capturing scores of rebels. A party of Accompong Maroons led by Maroon Captain Quashee, reporting to white superintendent John Kelly, captured six rebels in one skirmish. During the battle, an untold number of rebel men, women and children were driven over a steep precipice, and fell to their deaths in the canyon below. In addition, many rebels were shot and killed, or taken captive. The rebels' deaths may have numbered in the hundreds. Many were summarily executed after being captured, and accounts from members of the militia claimed no more than 400 rebels survived the battle.

However, despite this overwhelming victory, British forces had difficulty making headway against the guerrilla warfare now being employed by smaller groups of Apongo's soldiers. On 5 June, Lieutenant-Colonel Robert Spragge, found that the only group that was able to follow up with successes against the rebels were the Maroons of Trelawny Town. Under Maroon captains Furry of Trelawny Town and Accompong's Quashee, they killed more than a dozen rebels, and captured another 60, whom they brought to the estate of Moreland on 6 June. The rebels continued to resist the British for the rest of the year in western Jamaica, forcing the governor, Sir Henry Moore, 1st Baronet, to continue imposing martial law in Westmoreland and surrounding areas.

On 7 June, there were uprisings in Saint James Parish, Jamaica and Hanover, but the attempts by the rebels to capture the Glasgow Plantation were repelled by the plantation's owners, their white employees, armed sailors, and loyal enslaved Africans. Furry and his Trelawny Maroons then ambushed the rebels as they went east, killing several. However, most of the rebels escaped. On 10 June, on the outskirts of the estate of Mesopotamia, owned by Joseph Foster Barham I, a detachment of British regulars and militia defeated a band of rebels, killing about 40 and capturing another 50. On 20 June, the militia killed and captured 100 rebels in Westmoreland. On 22 June, one of the rebels was given a speedy trial for the murder of two white children, and once convicted, was sentenced to death by burning. That same day, another uprising in St James was thwarted, and more than 60 rebels were captured. Most of the captured rebels were summarily executed. However, many more rebels escaped into the Cockpit Country, where they united with Apongo's rebels. Several of these groups of smaller rebel bands moved between the mountains and the forests to escape the militia and the Maroons.

Facing defeat, many rebels committed suicide. Accounts from members of the militia boasted that about 700 rebels were killed in Western Jamaica. Thistlewood noted the stench of death emanating from nearby woods, where colonists also reported encountering hanging bodies of African men, women and children. The rebels were surrendering every day. On 3 July, the "King of the Rebels" Apongo was among those rebels captured by the militia. Another rebel named Davie was executed by being put in the gibbets to starve to death, which took a week to reach its conclusion. Apongo himself was hung up in chains for three days, after which he was to be taken down and burnt to death, according to his sentence. However, Apongo died in his cage within the three days, escaping the final part of his sentence.

The remaining rebels then fell under the leadership of a self-liberated slave named Simon, which took refuge in the Cockpit Country at a place called High Windward, from which they mounted a number of attacks on nearby plantations in Saint Elizabeth Parish. In October, in one such raid, these rebels attacked and destroyed Ipswich sugar estate, which was located at the mouth of the Y.S. river. On 23 December, Simon's rebels burnt down a house belonging to a Thomas Durrant, and shot another white man. High Windward eventually became the headquarters of another community of self-liberated Africans at the end of the century, led by Cuffee. It was reported that Simon's rebels numbered about 50 armed men and women, and that their goal was to secure recognition for their freedom, similar to the status accorded to the Maroons of Trelawny Town.

Shortly afterwards, parties sent to hunt Simon's rebels reported killing some of them, whereupon they cut off their heads, and stuck them on poles. However, Simon and the majority of his soldiers escaped, and the Assembly then summoned Hynes and his black regiment to hunt Simon's rebels. In January 1761, Simon's rebels relocated to a place named Mile Gully, which was then situated in Clarendon Parish, Jamaica. There were reports that Simon was shot and killed in a skirmish with a party sent to apprehend the rebels. Despite Simon's death, his band of soldiers continued to raid western estates, possibly under a new leader. By late 1761, Governor Moore declared that the main western revolt was over. However, some remaining self-liberated Africans scattered in small bands continued operating from the forested interior of the Cockpit Country, and they conducted a campaign of guerrilla warfare for the rest of the decade, staging raids on plantations within their reach. In 1763, bands of self-liberated Africans thought to have been members of Simon's rebels attacked plantations in Westmoreland and Hanover, killing several white colonists. This attack was brought to the attention of the new governor, William Henry Lyttelton, who aborted a tour to deal with the crisis, with the help of the Maroons of Trelawny Town.

== Aftermath ==
In May and June, a number of Tacky's men, who had surrendered, were executed after trials in Spanish Town and Kingston, Jamaica. One of them named Anthony was hanged, while another named Quaco was burnt at the stake. Another two were hung up in chains, and starved to death. In June 1760, similar plots had been discovered in Manchester Parish, and the now-defunct parishes of Saint John, Saint Dorothy and Saint Thomas-ye-Vale. In St Thomas-in-the-East (present day Saint Thomas Parish), an organized liberation movement ("slave rebellion") was betrayed by a conspirator named Cuffee, after which 19 of the organizers were executed. A similar planned liberation movement ("revolt") in Lluidas Valley in Saint John was also betrayed, this time by three loyal enslaved Africans who were involved. The conspiracy at Cocoa Walk Plantation at Saint Dorothy was revealed, and in July, four of the organizers involved were executed, while another six were re-sold into slavery in a neighbouring Spanish colony. In July, another liberation movement in Saint Thomas-in-the-East was crushed by a Maroon party led by Swigle, killing one leader named Pompey, while another named Akim hanged himself.

It was also discovered that the Cromanty in Kingston had enthroned a woman named 'Cubah' as the 'Queen of Kingston', and whilst holding court she sat in state under a canopy, wearing a robe and crown. It is unknown whether there was any direct communication between Cubah's people and Tacky's, but when discovered, she was ordered to be transported from the island for "conspiracy to rebel." Whilst at sea, she bribed the captain of the ship to put her ashore in western Jamaica where she joined the leeward Coromantins and remained at large for months; on being recaptured, she was executed.

It took months and even years for order to be restored, depending on which parish the rebels operated from. Over 60 white colonists had lost their lives, and a similar number of free people of colour, in addition to 400 or so African rebels, including two leaders who were burned alive, and two others who were hung in iron cages at the Kingston Parade until they starved to death. More than 500 rebels were re-captured, or "transported" to be re-sold to new enslavers in British Honduras. It is estimated that the destruction caused by Tacky's Revolt, and other spin-off rebellions, cost the Colony of Jamaica over £100,000, which is £25,000,000 as of April 2023. The colonial Assembly passed a number of draconian laws to regulate the black population in the aftermath of Tacky's Revolt. In addition, they banned the West African religious practices of Obeah.

The organized liberation movements ("rebellions") of Tacky and Apongo continued to inspire uprisings during the decade of the 1760s, with the authorities in Spanish Town discovering another conspiracy in 1764. In 1765, an uprising in St Mary resulted in rebels setting the Whitehall estate of Zachary Bayly on fire. The revolt was led by Abruco, who was given the slave name of Blackwall, and had been acquitted for his role in Tacky's Revolt of 1760 for lack of evidence. Several white plantation workers were killed, but when Bayly led his militia against the rebels, and killed several of them, other rebels committed suicide. This time around, Abruco was condemned to be burnt alive, while other rebels were hanged or transported and sold.

In October 1766, another slave rebellion took place in Westmoreland, also inspired by Tacky's Revolt. About 33 people rose up in revolt, and killed 19 white colonists, before they were defeated. Several weeks afterwards, the militia was still hunting rebels in the region. Rebels who were convicted were sentenced to be burnt alive. Most of the remaining rebels then moved to the south-western Saint Elizabeth Parish, where they operated out of the mountainous forests of Nassau Mountain.

Tacky Monument in Claude Stuart Park can be visited in Port Maria, the parish capital of St Mary. Tacky Falls is accessible by the sea but the overland route is considered by locals to be too tough to travel. The waterfalls have diminished over the years and mainly eroded rocks mark the course. The exact location of the cave where the remains of Tacky's men were found is not known. Tacky's Rebellion was, like many other Atlantic-African organized liberation movements ("slave revolts"), put down quickly and mercilessly by colonial officials. Plantation owners severely punished rebels. However, the spin-off movements ("rebellions") lasted for several months and even years after the main movement ("revolt") was crushed. In addition, there is no record of Simon's self-liberated communities being routed. It is possible that they may have merged with other successful self-liberated communities in subsequent decades, and they may have served as an inspiration for other organized liberation movements ("slave revolts").

Contemporary historian Robert Charles Dallas wrote that in the 1770s, a community of self-liberated Africans formed the Congo Settlement in the Cockpit Country, and resisted efforts by the Accompong Maroons to break them up until the end of the century. It is possible that Simon's rebels, and those from the 1766 Revolt, made up a significant part of free black people in Jamaica. Many of the survivors of this community went on to fight on the side of Cudjoe's Town (Trelawny Town) in the Second Maroon War. In May 2023, a plaque commemorating plantation owner John Gordon that contained racist language and praised his involvement in suppressing the rebellion was removed from St Peter's Church in Dorchester. The plaque, which had its offensive portion covered over since September 2020, has been moved to the nearby Dorset Museum.

== See also ==
- Bussa's rebellion
- New York Slave Revolt of 1712
- 1733 slave insurrection on St. John
- Prince Klaas
- New York Conspiracy of 1741
- Berbice Rebellion
- Denmark Vesey
- Demerara Rebellion
