= Nathaniel Bayly =

English planter and politician

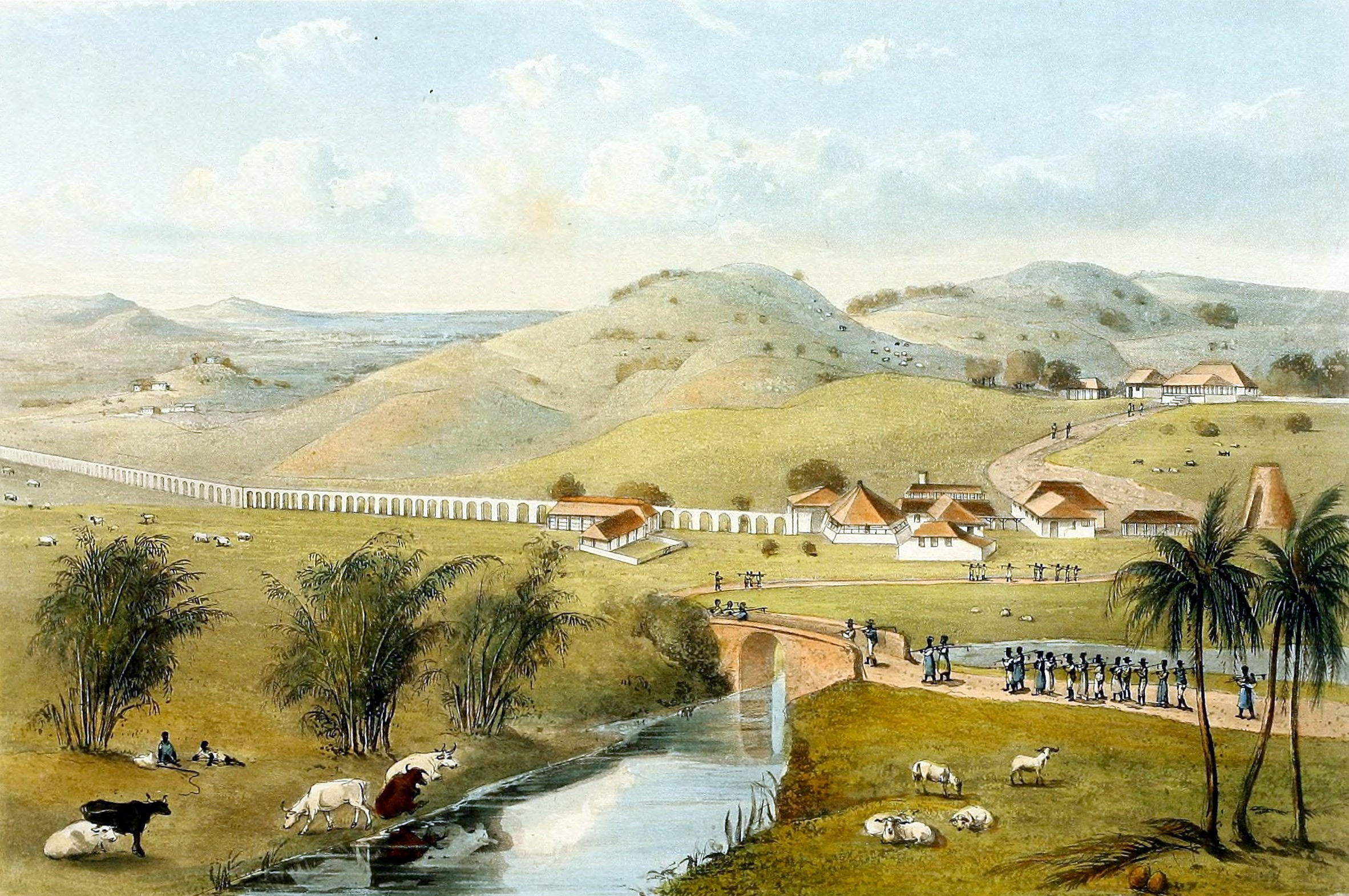
"Trinity Estate, St. Mary's" by James Hakewill, 1820–21.

Nathaniel Bayly (c. 1726 – 1798) was an English planter and politician who sat in the House of Commons from 1770 to 1779.

== Early life ==
In 1726, Nathaniel Bayly was born in Westbury, Wiltshire.

In the 1730s, Nathaniel Bayly was a young boy when his family relocated with him to the Colony of Jamaica. In 1759, Nathaniel Bayly moved to England, and he conducted a trans-Atlantic family business with his brother Zachary Bayly, using their slaves on their Jamaican estates to create large profits, and using their political contacts to protect their investments.

== Slave owner ==
The Bayly family owned several plantations and thousands of slaves in the Colony of Jamaica.

After being with his family in Jamaica, he returned to England in 1759, and lived in London. The Gentleman’s and Citizen’s Almanack for 1772 lists Bayly’s town residence as Dover Street in Mayfair and his country residence as Hanwell, Middlesex. He was described by his nephew Bryan Edwards as living “in a high and elegant style of life”. In 1768 he was appointed to the board of trustees of the Charity of William Hobbayne. In the 1770s, he commissioned a survey and garden design from Capability Brown (See Page 96 of Brown’s account book) but the house for which the work was to be done is not recorded.

In 1770, Nathaniel Bayly inherited the Jamaican property of his brother Zachary, which included plantations and thousands of slaves at Baylys Vale, Brimmer Hall, Crawle, Nonsuch, Trinity plantation, Tryall and Unity and stores and other buildings in Saint Mary Parish, Jamaica, including the town of Port Maria, and at Greenwich Park in Saint Andrew Parish, Jamaica.

== Family ==
Mrs. Nathaniel Bailey, née Lamack, miniature by John Smart, c.1776.

He married Elizabeth Ingram, daughter of Hon. Charles Ingram MP on 3 May 1767. Bayly married secondly Sophia Magdalena Lamack of Clapham on 18 March 1773.

== Political career ==
Bayly was invited to stand for Abingdon in the 1768 general election, probably because he could afford the expense. He was defeated in the poll but was seated as Member of Parliament on petition on 8 February 1770. In the 1774 general election he stood for Abingdon, but fearing defeat was also named for Westbury on Lord Abingdon's interest. The election at Abingdon was declared void because the winning candidate, John Mayor, was High Sheriff at the time, and Bayly decided to sit for Westbury where he had been unopposed. Over the next few years, Bayly made frequent speeches in Parliament, almost entirely with regard to West Indies affairs. He feared mainly that the American policy would be disastrous for the Islands, but also criticized the rum contract, complained that the islands were inadequately defended and attacked an extra tax on sugar. In March 1779 he resigned his seat because he had important matters to deal with in the West Indies and could not do justice to his parliamentary duties. He had returned to England by 1783 and made several attempts to find a seat in Parliament but was unsuccessful.

== Later life and legacy ==
From 1790 to 1796, Bayly was Commissioner of Forts and Fortifications, for the North side of Jamaica. He died in Jamaica in October 1798. In his will he refers to his sugar plantations at Bremer Hall, Roslin, Trinity and Tryall and estates at Gibraltar and Wentworth on the island of Jamaica, and the "large quantities of negroes, stock and cattle" on them.

Parliament of Great Britain
Preceded by John Morton	Member of Parliament for Abingdon; 1770–1774	Succeeded by John Mayor
Preceded by Hon. Charles Dillon; Peregrine Bertie	Member of Parliament for Westbury; 1774–1779; With: Hon. Thomas Wenman	Succeeded by Hon. Thomas Wenman; Samuel Estwick
