= Frontier Estate =

Sugar plantation in Port Maria, Jamaica

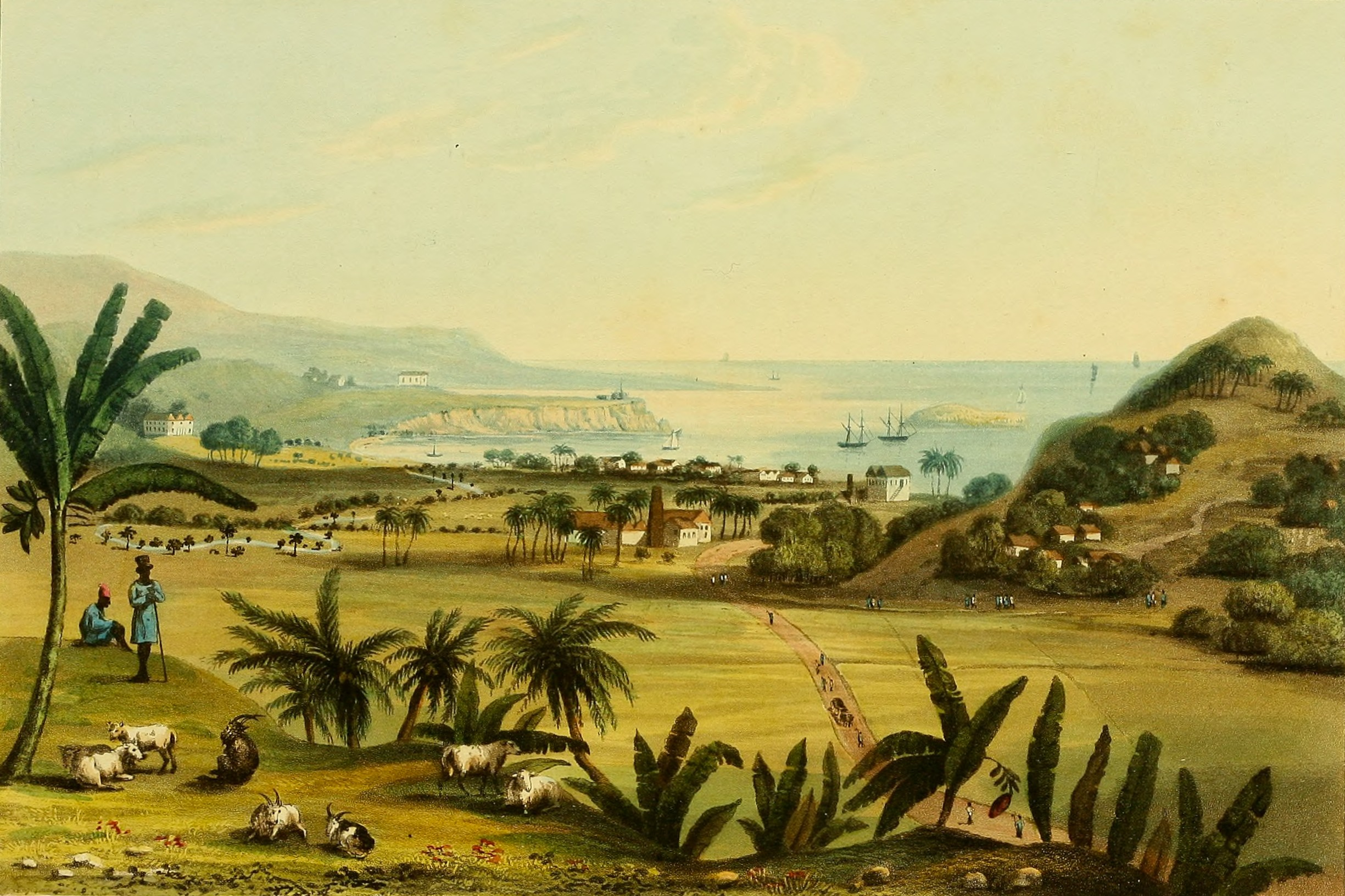
Frontier Estate, 1825 by James Hakewill

Frontier Estate was a sugar plantation located in Port Maria (Saint Mary Parish), Jamaica.

== History ==
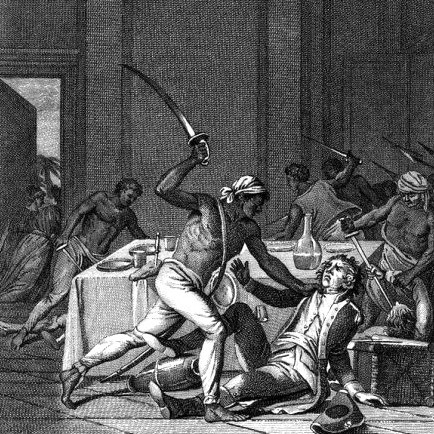
Tacky's slave revolt in 1760

In May 1760, Tacky, a slave overseer on the Frontier plantation led a enslaved Africans revolt.

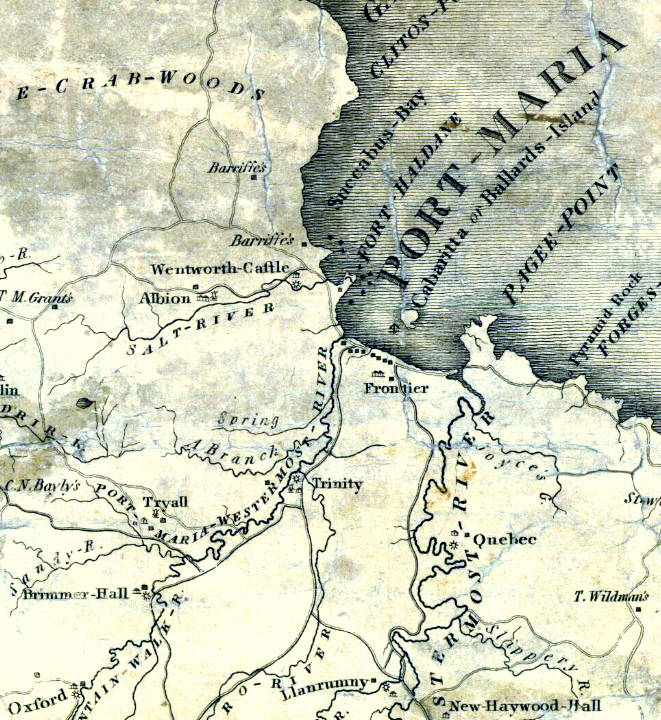
Frontier Estate on map by James Robertson, 1804

The estate covered 1,415 acres which were worked by 325 enslaved Africans in 1832.

Following emancipation in 1834, the formerly enslaved Africans were obliged to remain on the plantations as "apprentices", whereby they worked as before for three-quarters of their time, but were free to sell their labour outside these hours. Originally planned to last eight years, public pressure brought these "apprenticeships" to an end in 1838. At this time there were 268 "apprentices" at Frontier.
