= Brimmer Hall =

Coordinates: 18.3447°N 76.9204°W

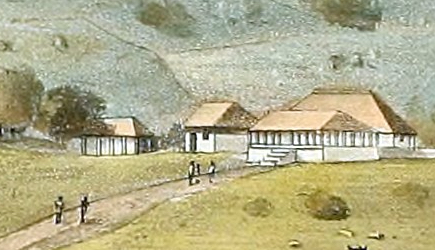
Detail of Brimmer Hall from "Trinity Estate, St. Mary's" by James Hakewill, 1820–1821

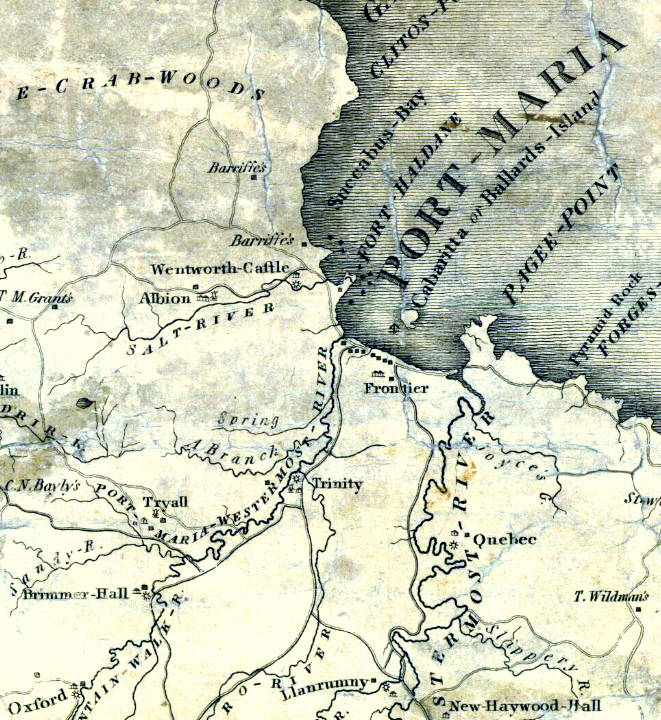
Brimmer Hall as shown on James Robertson's map of 1804

Brimmer Hall is a Jamaican Great House and 642-acre (2.60 km^{2}) plantation located near Port Maria, in Saint Mary Parish, Jamaica. In the eighteenth century Brimmer Hall was owned by Zachary Bayly as part of a series of contiguous sugar plantations. These consisted of Trinity, Tryall, and Roslyn Pen as well as Brimmer Hall. Together they were known as Bayly's Vale. The land was worked by about 1,100 enslaved Africans in this period.

The house has a single story building with high ceilings and polished wooden floors which were constructed by hand out of local hard woods. There is a wide verandah and out-buildings consist of storage sheds, household servant’s quarters, two kitchens (one for the great house and one for the servants) and stables.

== Tourist attraction ==
In the 1960s Brimmer Hall was owned by Major Douglas Vaughan who developed the location as a tourist attraction. As the plantation was growing produce such as coconuts, with 15,580 trees, bananas, citrus and pimento, visitors were shown around the plantation and then allowed to enjoy facilities which included a flower garden, swimming pool and bar. In 1967 he opened six shops in the former stables, which had previously housed a number of race horses. These had been reconditioned and given the names of race horses associated with Brimmer Hall: Grey Owl, Dandy, Creation, Please Forward, Madonna and Rakoush. Each shop specialised in a particular range of goods: one stall provided goat skin products and chinaware, another replicas of pirate treasure found in Port Royal, straw goods, textiles and other miscellaneous items. Karl Parboosingh was the art consultant and several of his paintings were also on sale.
