= Negro River (disambiguation) =

Río Negro Province is a province of Argentina.

Negro River may also refer to:

- Negro River (Saint Mary, Jamaica)
- Negro River (Saint Thomas, Jamaica)

== See also ==
- Rio Negro (disambiguation)
