= Negro River (Saint Mary, Jamaica) =

Location
- Country: Jamaica

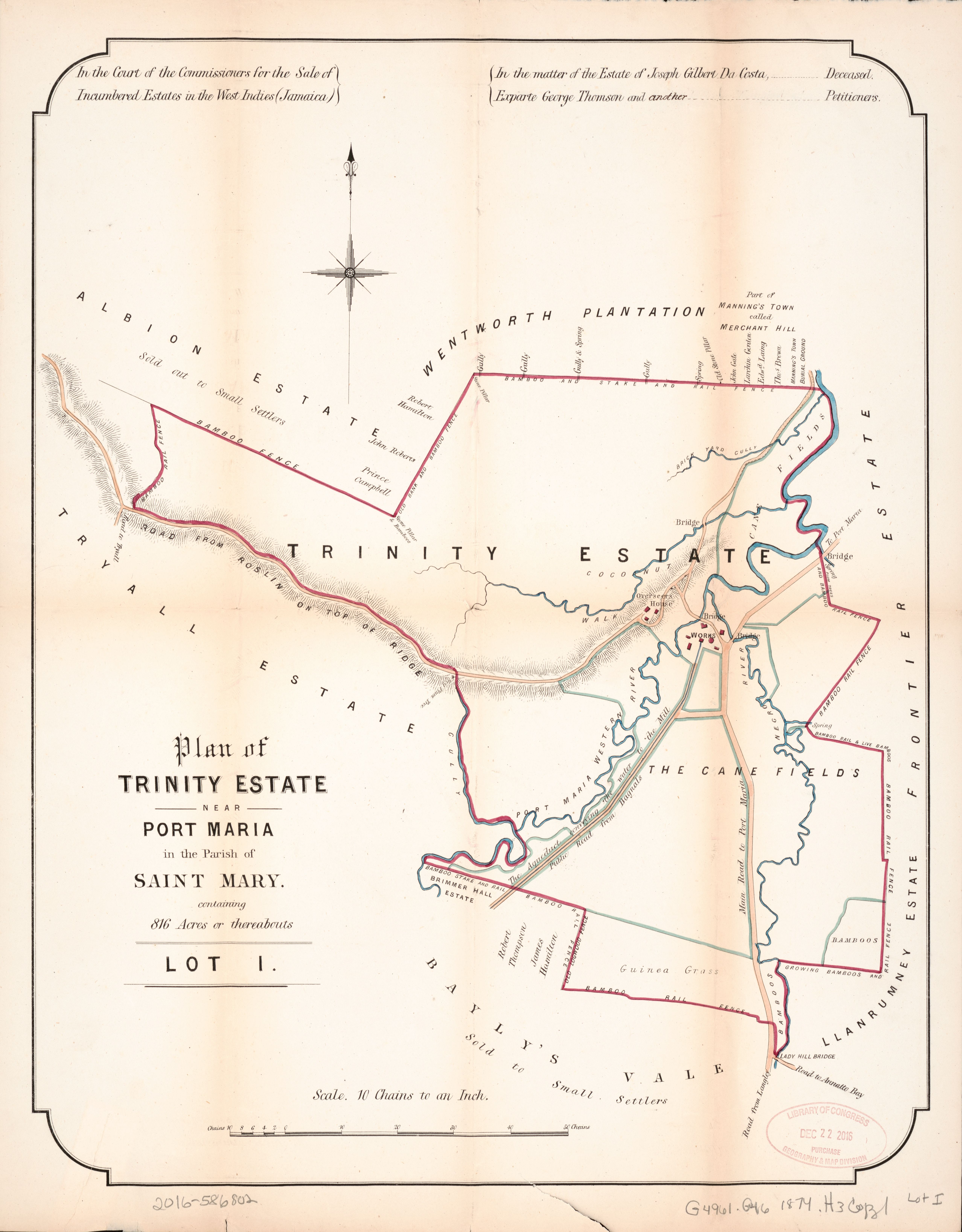
Confluence of the Negro River and the Otram, then known as the Port Maria Westernmost River, at Trinity plantation on an 1874 map.

The Negro River is a river in Saint Mary Parish, Jamaica, that joins the River Otram at Trinity before reaching the sea at the parish capital of Port Maria.

== See also ==
- List of rivers of Jamaica
- Paggee River
