= Trinity plantation =

Plantation in Jamaica

Coordinates: 18.359°N 76.903°W

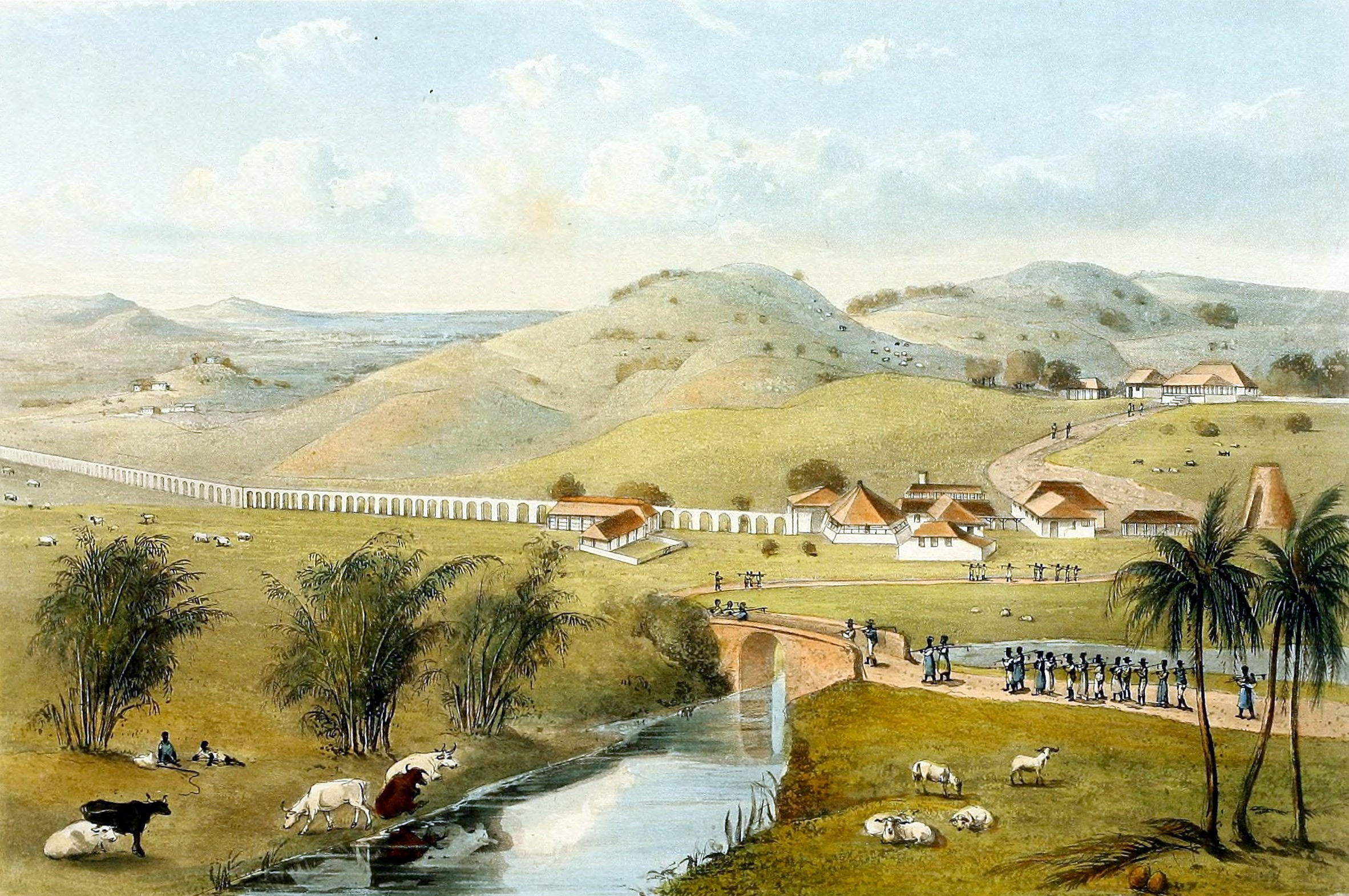
"Trinity Estate, St. Mary's" by James Hakewill, 1820–21.

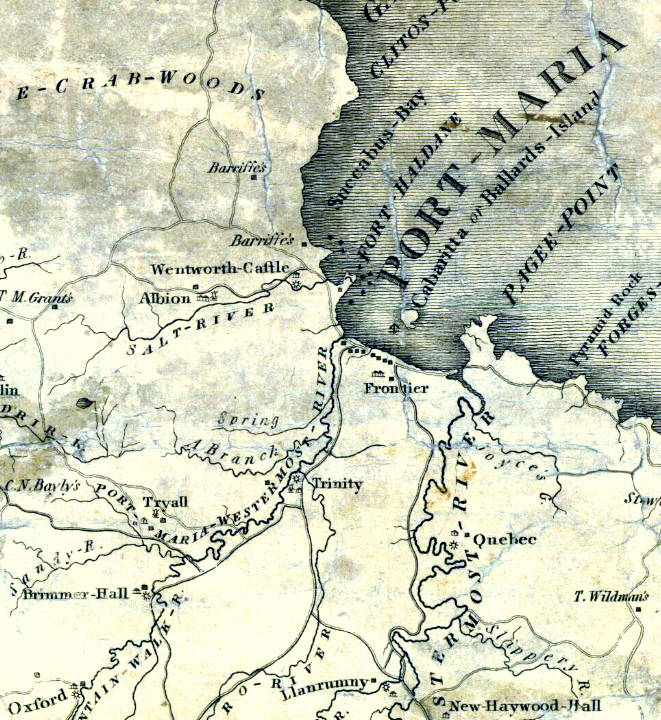
Trinity plantation (centre) on James Robertson's map of 1804

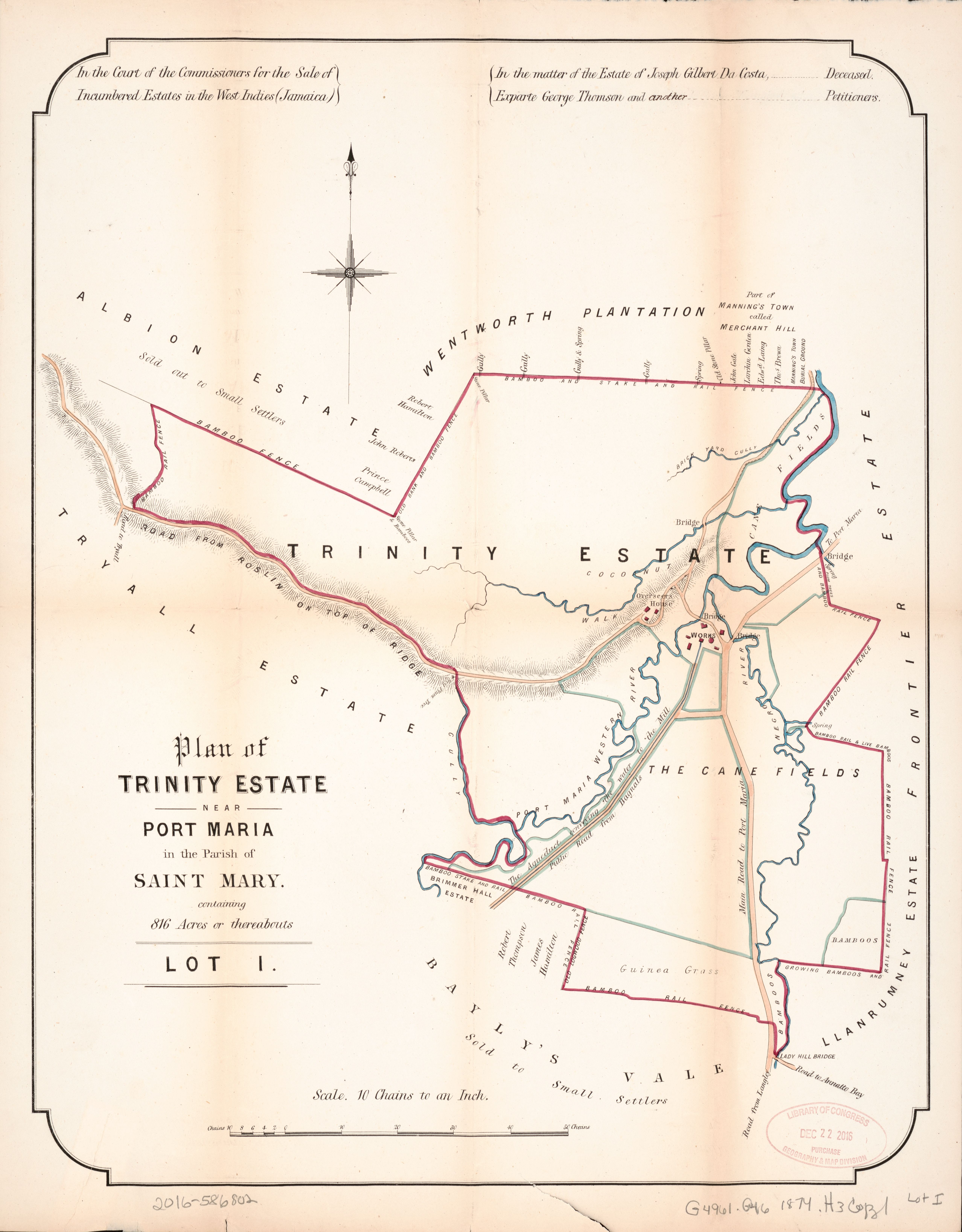
1874 auction sale map of Trinity Estate.

Trinity was a plantation in colonial Jamaica, located south of Port Maria, in Saint Mary Parish, one of several plantations owned by Zachary Bayly that formed part of the area known as Bayly's Vale. By the early nineteenth century, over 1,000 people were enslaved there producing mainly sugar and rum for which a mile-long aqueduct was built by Nathaniel Bayly to supply water for the refining process.

In 1760, slaves from Trinity started a rebellion which grew to over 400 slaves, but was put down with troops sent by the Governor.

== History ==
=== Ownership ===
Among the earliest owners of Trinity plantation were Isaac Gale (died 1748), and Zachary Bayly (died 1769), who also owned the Tryall, Brimmer Hall, and Roslyn plantations, which formed one contiguous area of around 4–5,000 acres known as Bayly's Vale.

After Zachary Bayly's death, Trinity passed into the ownership of his nephew Bryan Edwards (died 1800), his brother Nathaniel Bayly (died 1798), and his son Charles Nathaniel Bayly, the nephew of Zachary Bayly. After the Baylys, the plantation came under the control of the merchant and banker Job Mathew Raikes, who married Charlotte Bayly, daughter of Nathaniel Bayly. Raikes died in 1833, the same year that slavery was abolished in the British Empire by the Slavery Abolition Act, compensation being paid to his executors in 1837 of £4,026 in respect of 212 enslaved persons at Trinity.

=== Aqueduct and production ===
A good water supply was necessary for sugar refining and Trinity was located at the confluence of the Port Maria Western River, now the Otram River, and the Negro River. In addition, Nathaniel Bayly built an aqueduct, completed in 1797, of over a mile's length from Port Maria Western River to Trinity. It is shown centrally in James Hakewill's illustration of the plantation with the Brimmer Hall works and overseer's house in the background.

Hakewill wrote that the area produced 1,000-1,100 hogsheads of sugar annually and in 1815 had produced 1,450 with a population of around 1,100 slaves. The principal products of the plantation were sugar and rum, but it also produced molasses, logwood, and cattle.

=== Rebellion ===
In 1760, during Tacky's Rebellion, about 50 slaves rebelled and marched on Port Maria where they seized weapons. They were mostly from Trinity plantation but also from Whitehall, Frontier, and Heywood Hall. According to Edward Long, their number grew to around 400 before the rebellion was put down with help from troops sent by the Governor.

=== Final sale ===
In 1874, Trinity came up for sale at auction in London by order of the Court of the Commissioners for Sale of Incumbered Estates in the West Indies. The sale particulars stated that it was of 816 acres with 227 under cultivation, with 111 animals, mostly steers, and multiple buildings and machinery.

== Legacy ==
A settlement named Trinity still exists. Other local features are Bailey's Vale Road, Brimmer Vale High School, and the settlement of Tryall.

== See also ==
- List of plantations in Jamaica
