= Zachary Bayly (planter) =

Zachary Bayly (1721-1769) was an English-born Jamaican planter and politician.

== Early life ==
In the 1730s, Zachary Bayly was a young boy when his family relocated with him to the Colony of Jamaica. In 1759, his brother Nathaniel Bayly moved to England, and the two brothers conducted a trans-Atlantic family business, using their slaves on their Jamaican estates to create large profits, and using their political contacts to protect their investments.

== Slave owner ==
Bayly was the owner of Bayly's Vale, Brimmer Hall, Nonsuch, Trinity, Tryall and Unity plantations as well 3,000 acres in cattle pens.

In addition to being a sugar planter, Bayly was also a successful sugar merchant. He also served as a planting attorney for several absentee owners, managing several thousand more slaves for other estates. He was one of the 10 wealthiest Jamaicans in the eighteenth century.

== Tacky's Revolt ==
In 1760, when Tacky's War broke out, slaves rose up in revolt on Bayly's estates at Trinity.

== Death and estate ==
Bayly owned over 2,000 slaves at the time of his death in 1769. His estate was valued at over £114,000 when he died.

== Family ==
He was the brother of Nathaniel Bayly, both being uncles of the politician Bryan Edwards.
