= Charity of William Hobbayne =

The Charity of William Hobbayne is a charity for the relief of people in Ealing and Hanwell who are in conditions of need, hardship or distress.

== History ==
The Charity of William Hobbayne was set up in Hanwell in 1484 when local resident William Hobbayne or Hobbyns bequeathed 22 acres of land and a house valued at £6 per year to be used in benefit for the poor for so-called "godly purposes". This donation also helped at the time to educate and clothe twenty-four boys of the parish free of charge at the school of Greenford Magna. The Charity of William Hobbayne or Hobbayne's Charity then became the most important charity in that parish.

The Charity has records going back to 1612 which are lodged with the London Metropolitan Archive. William Hobbayne's will was lost within a century of his death. A search carried out in 1804 failed to find the will. According to an Inquisition held on 3 April 1612:

At Court held for Manor of Greenford and Hanwell on 6 May 1573, it is recorded that William Hobbayne surrendered to "godly uses"; the admission at various times of feoffees to hold the lands to the use and behoof of the parishioners of Hanwell, to maintain the church there and relieve the poor of the same parish.

By the 17th century, the Charity of William Hobbayne owned a significant amount of land in the parish of Hanwell. Its board of trustees came from the richest and most powerful residents of the area and acted, in effect, as a parish council.

== Governance ==
Hobbayne's Charity is registered with the Charity Commission as Charity Number: 211547. It has 12 trustees. The Rector of St Mary's church in Hanwell is automatically (ex officio) appointed as the charity's Chair.

== Award ==
In 2022, the Charity of William Hobbayne received the Queen's Award for Voluntary Service.
