= Port Maria =

Port Maria Puot Mariya
- Parish Capital
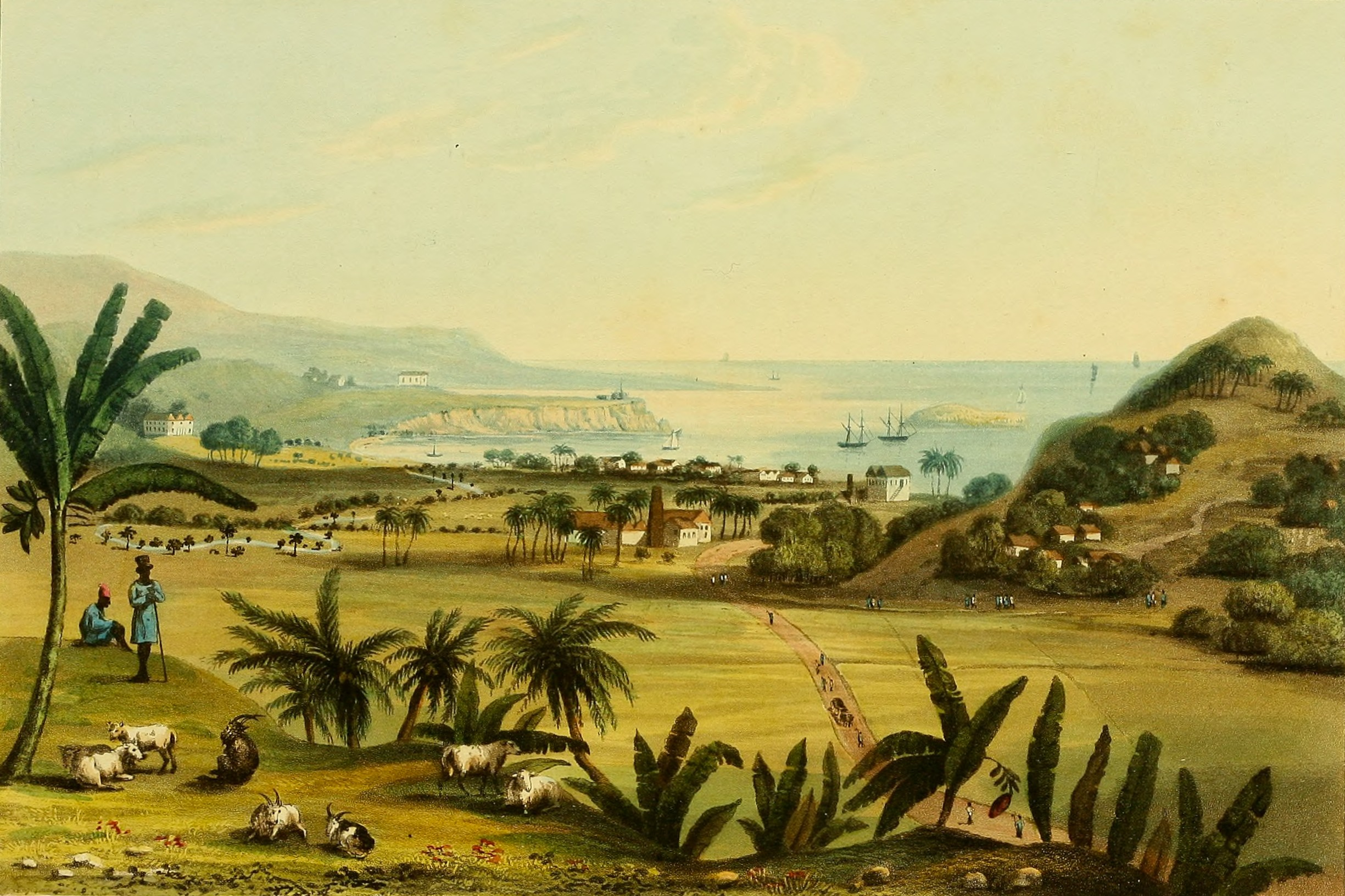
- Port Maria, 1825, engraving by James Hakewill

- Location within Jamaica
- Coordinates: 18.3702474°N 76.8903065°W
- Country: Jamaica
- Parish: Saint Mary

Population (2022)
  - Total: 8,240

Port Maria (Jamaican Patois: Puot Mariya) is the capital town of the Jamaican parish of Saint Mary.

Originally named "Puerto Santa Maria", it was the second town established by Spanish settlers in Jamaica. The ruins of Fort Haldane, built 1759, overlook the town.

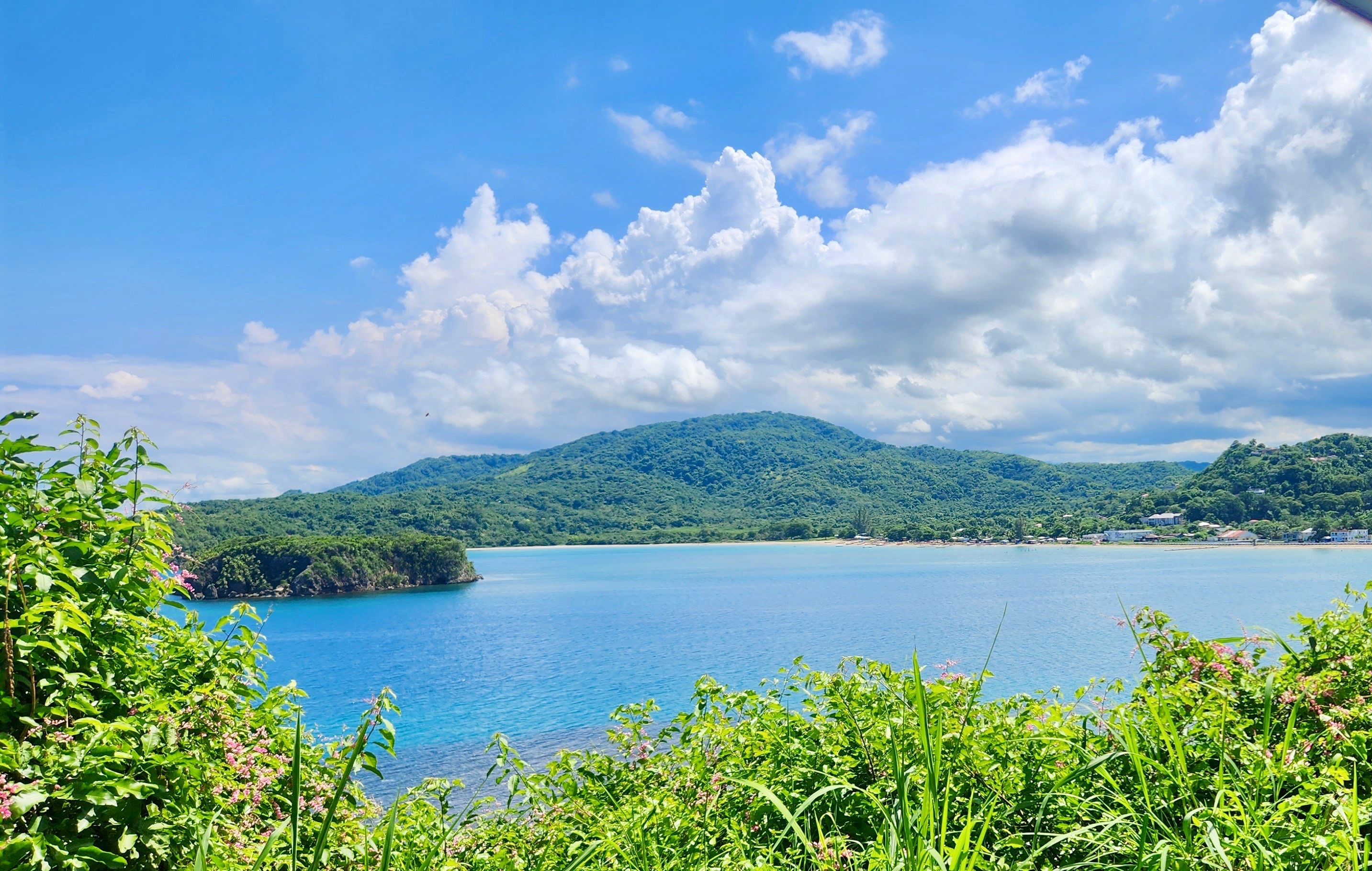
Port Maria Harbor & Cabarita Is.

It has a population of 8,240 people and 2,870 dwellings according to the 2022 Census. Notable structures include St Mary's Parish Church, built in 1861, and the St Mary courthouse, a Georgian structure built in 1820 which now houses the Port Maria civic centre. Jamaica's first Prime minister Alexander Bustamante was put on trial for manslaughter with Frank Pixley at the courthouse in 1947. They were acquitted.

Port Maria is the birthplace of Sports Illustrated model Georgianna Robertson.

As of March 2024, the mayor is Fitzroy Wilson of the People's National Party.

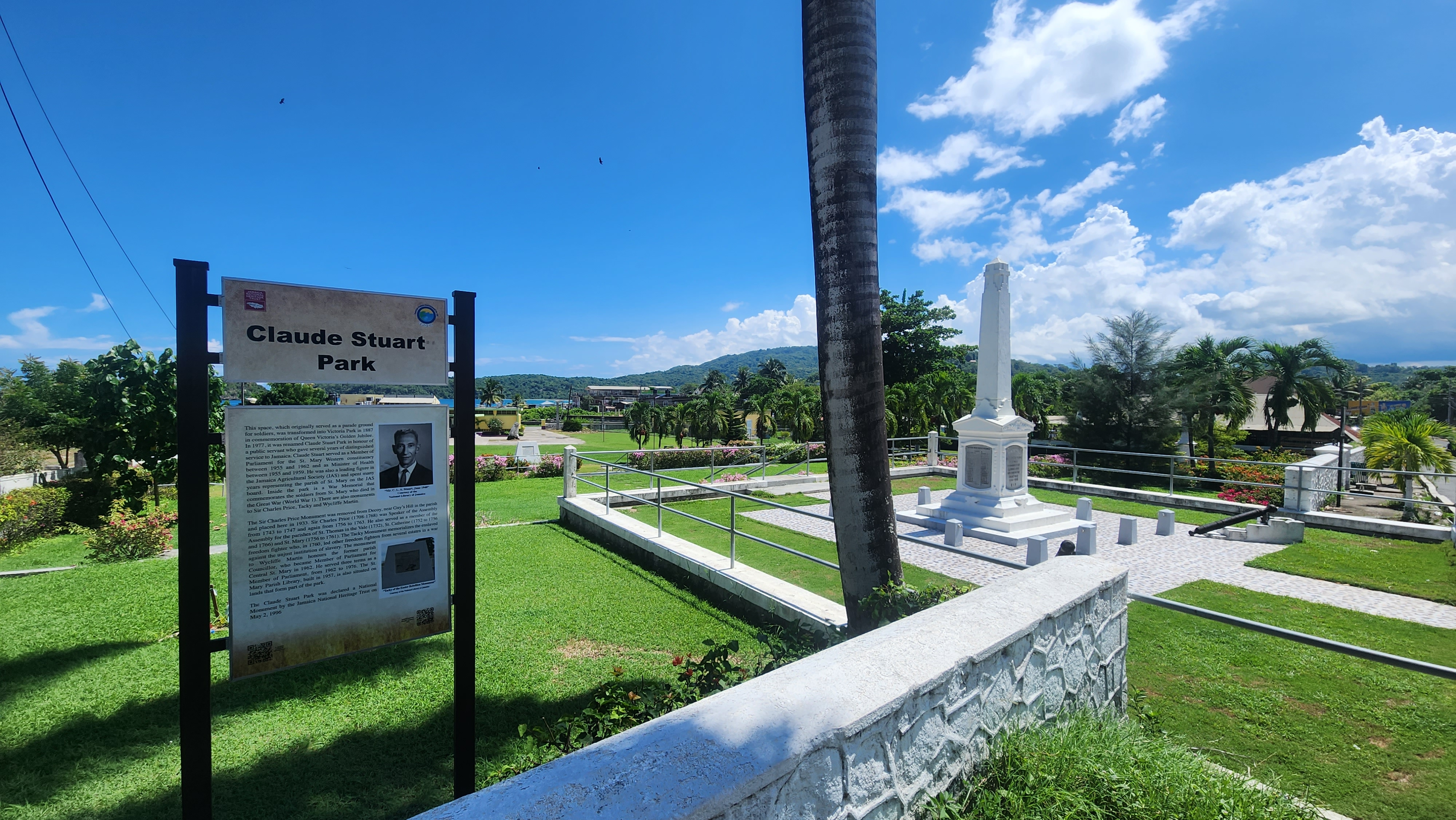
Claude Stuart Park historic marker sign

The Jamaica Heritage trail has Fort Haldane, the St. Mary Courthouse and Claude Stuart Park with marked signage.

== Notable buildings ==
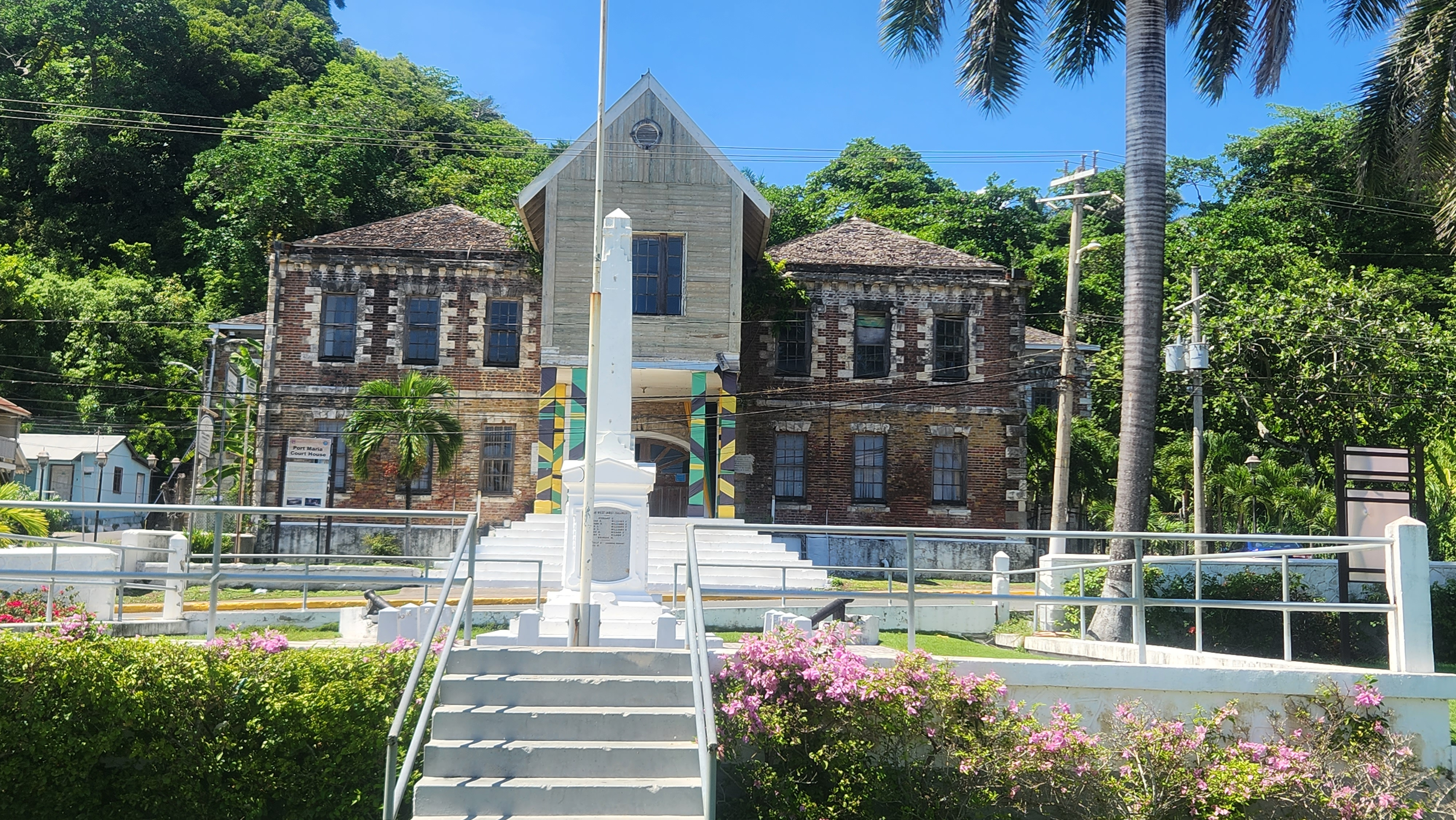
Port Maria Civic Centre, once the St. Mary Parish Courthouse (Historic Bldg)

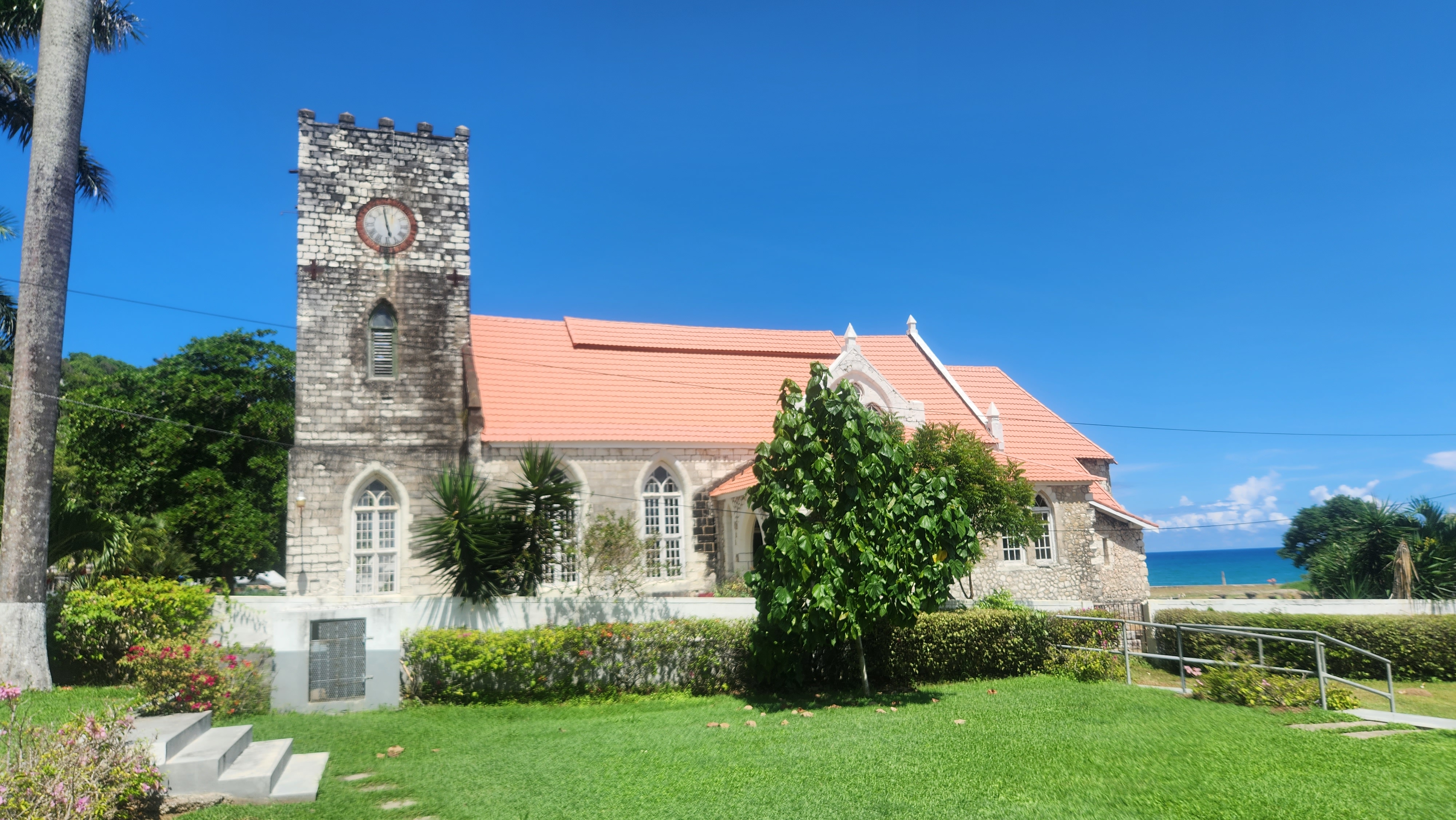
St. Mary Parish Church

- St Mary courthouse, a Georgian structure built in 1820. Jamaica's first Prime minister Alexander Bustamante was tried in 1947 for manslaughter with Frank Pixley at the courthouse. They were acquitted. After a fire gutted the building in 1988, it was rebuilt maintaining the original style and reopened as the Port Maria Civic Centre in 2000.
- St Mary's Parish Church, built in 1861

== Economy ==
Port Maria exports bananas. it is also a local economic centre for surrounding localities, serving as a market for them. The surrounding area produces logwood, coconuts, coffee, oranges, and pimento.

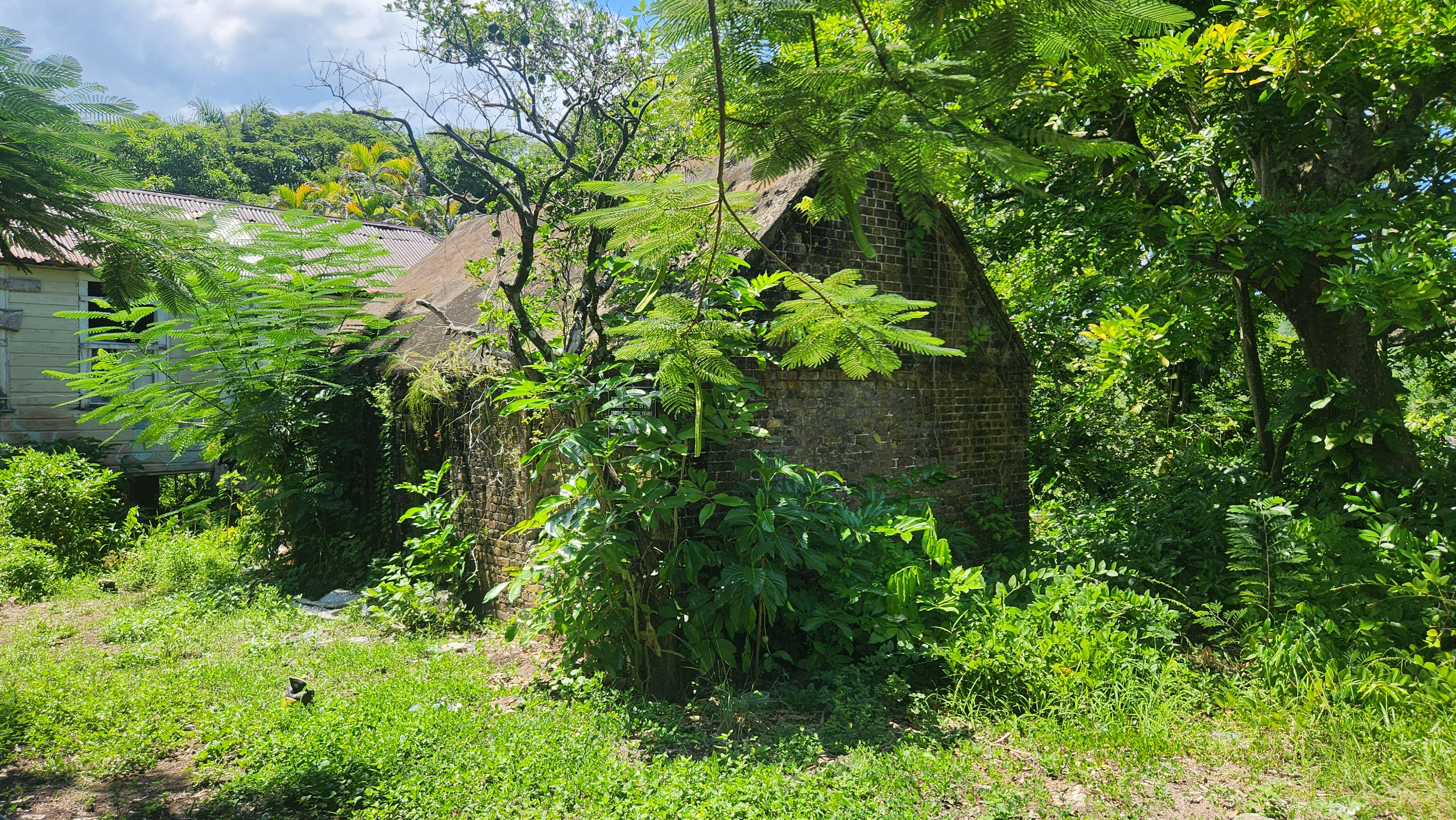
Armory Bldg at Fort Haldane

== See also ==
- Otram River
- Paggee River
- Frontier Estate
- Trinity plantation
- Alfred Constantine Goffe
