= Pagee River =

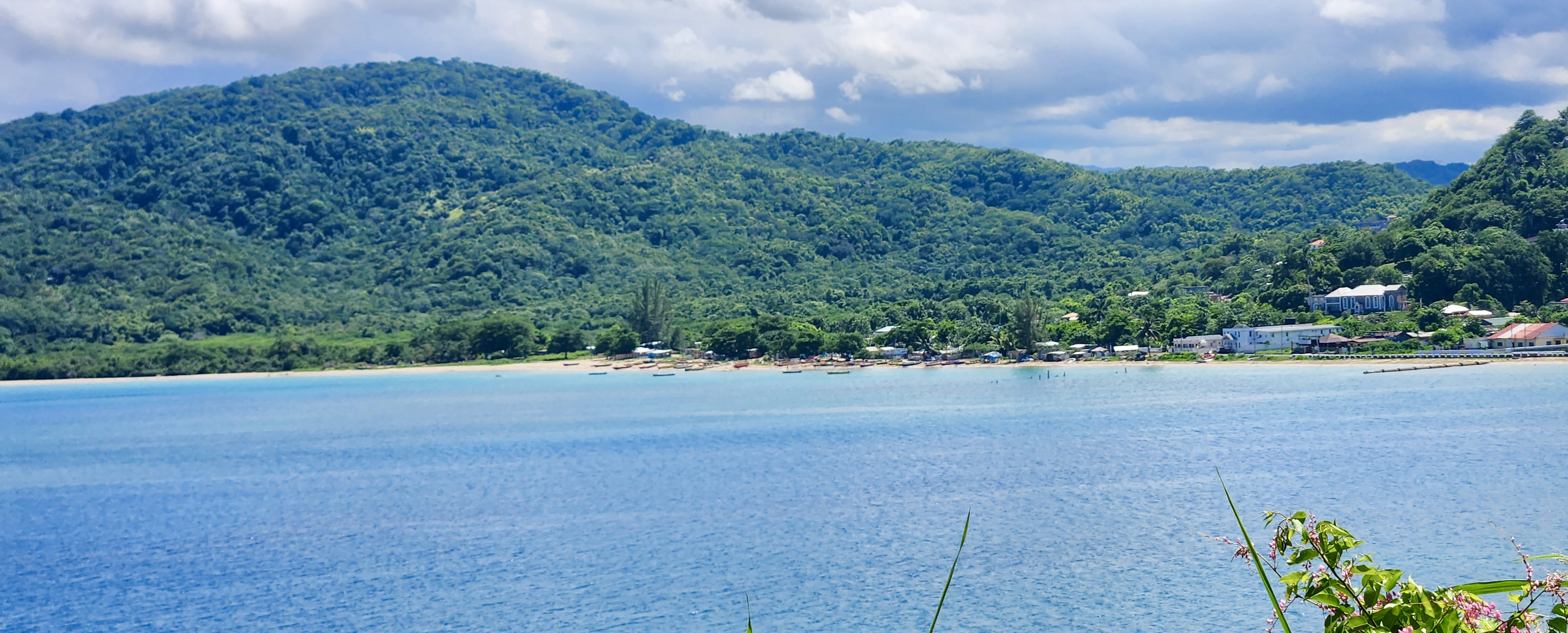

Location
- Country: Jamaica
- Location: Saint Mary

Physical characteristics
- Source
  - coordinates: 18.29488°N 76.92817°W
  - elevation: 970 ft (300 m)
- Mouth
  - coordinates: 18.36845°N 76.87935°W
  - elevation: Sea level
- Length: 14 mi (23 km)
- Basin size: Pagee

Basin features
- Tributaries
  - left: From head to source: 03. Unnamed River; 04. White River; 06. Unnamed River; 07. Llanrumney River; 09. Unnamed River
  - right: From head to source: 01. Frenchmans River; 02. Broughtons River; 05. Unnamed River; 08. Slippery River; 10. Unnamed River; 11. Unnamed River; 12. Joyees Gully

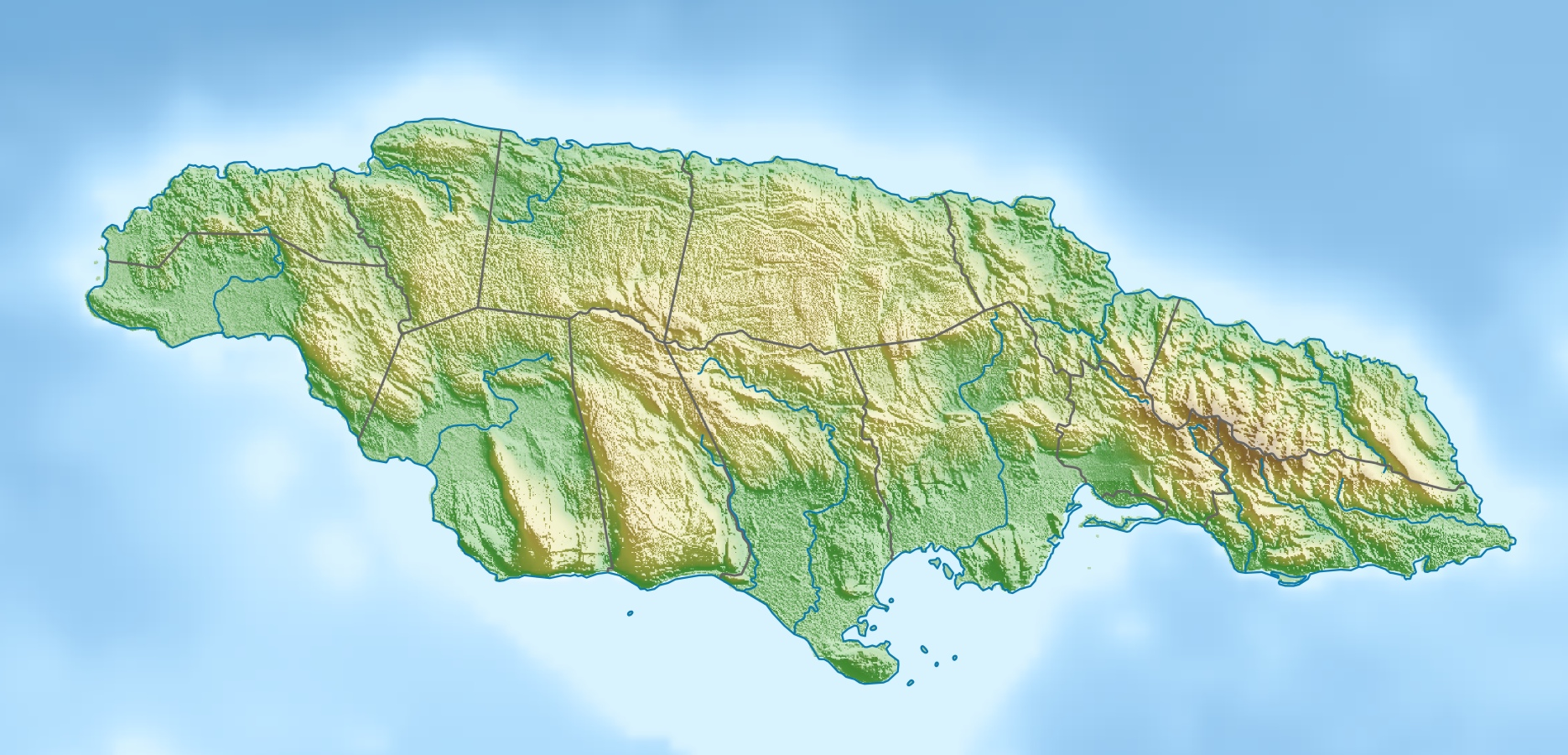
Mouth of the Pagee River

The Pagee River rises on the south eastern flank of Berry Hill (a 1,655 ft (504 m) summit) just below the 1,000 ft (300 m) contour at 18.29488°N 76.92817°W near Crawle Pen in Saint Mary. It reaches the sea 14 miles (23 km) later at Pagee Beach (18.36845°N 76.87935°W) also in Saint Mary.

== Gallery ==
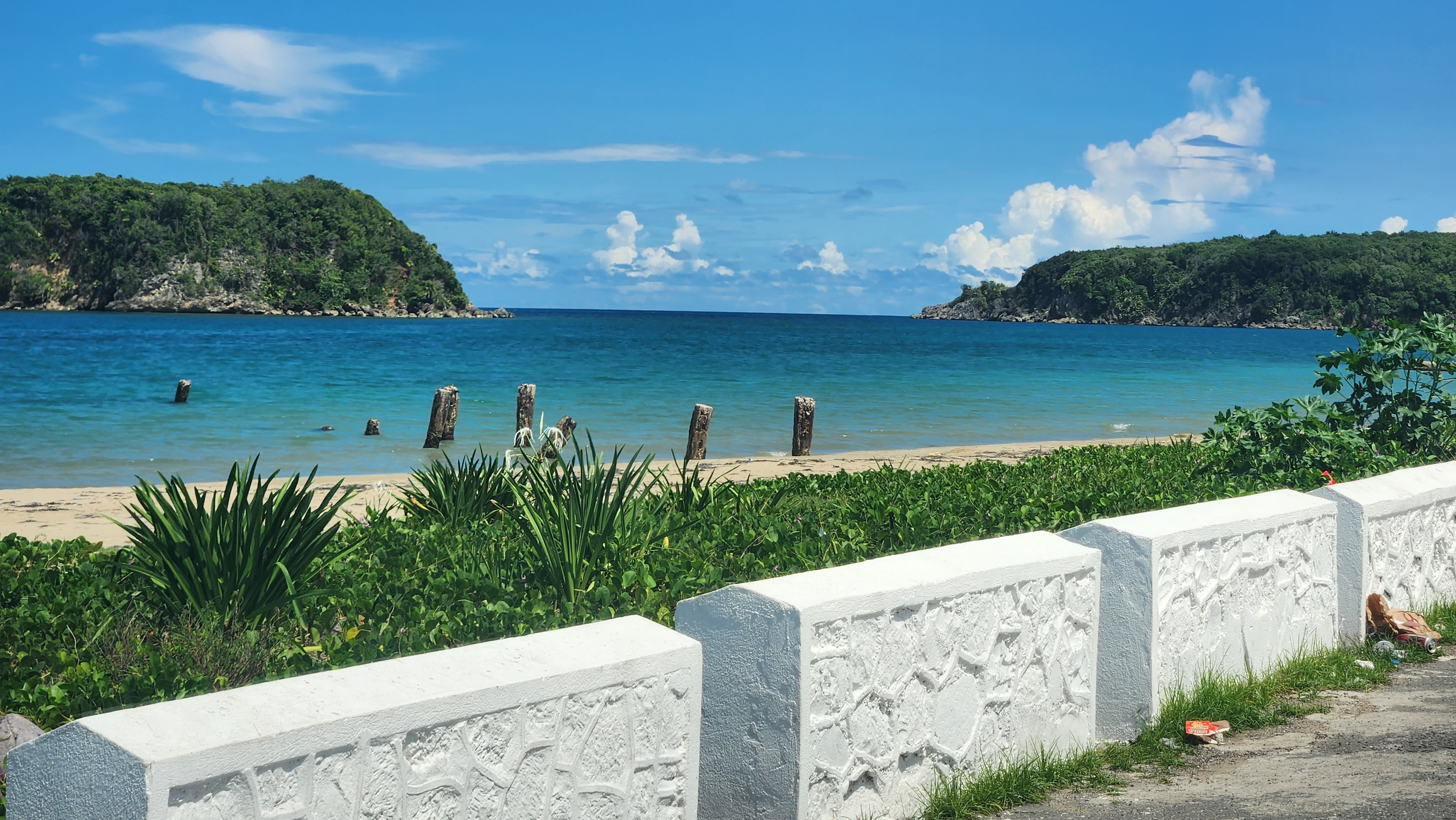
Pagee Beach near Main St., Port Maria

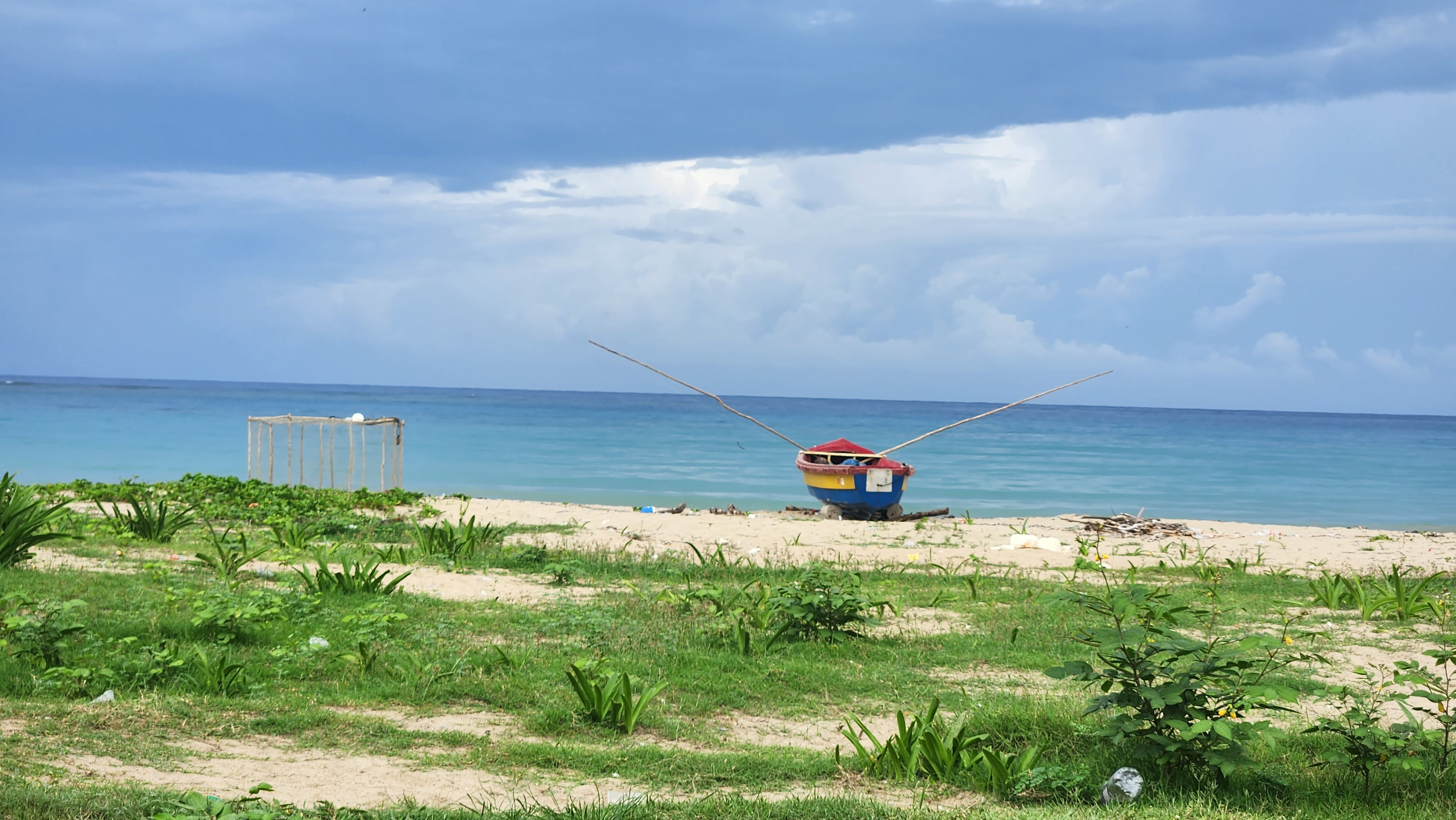
Pagee Beach

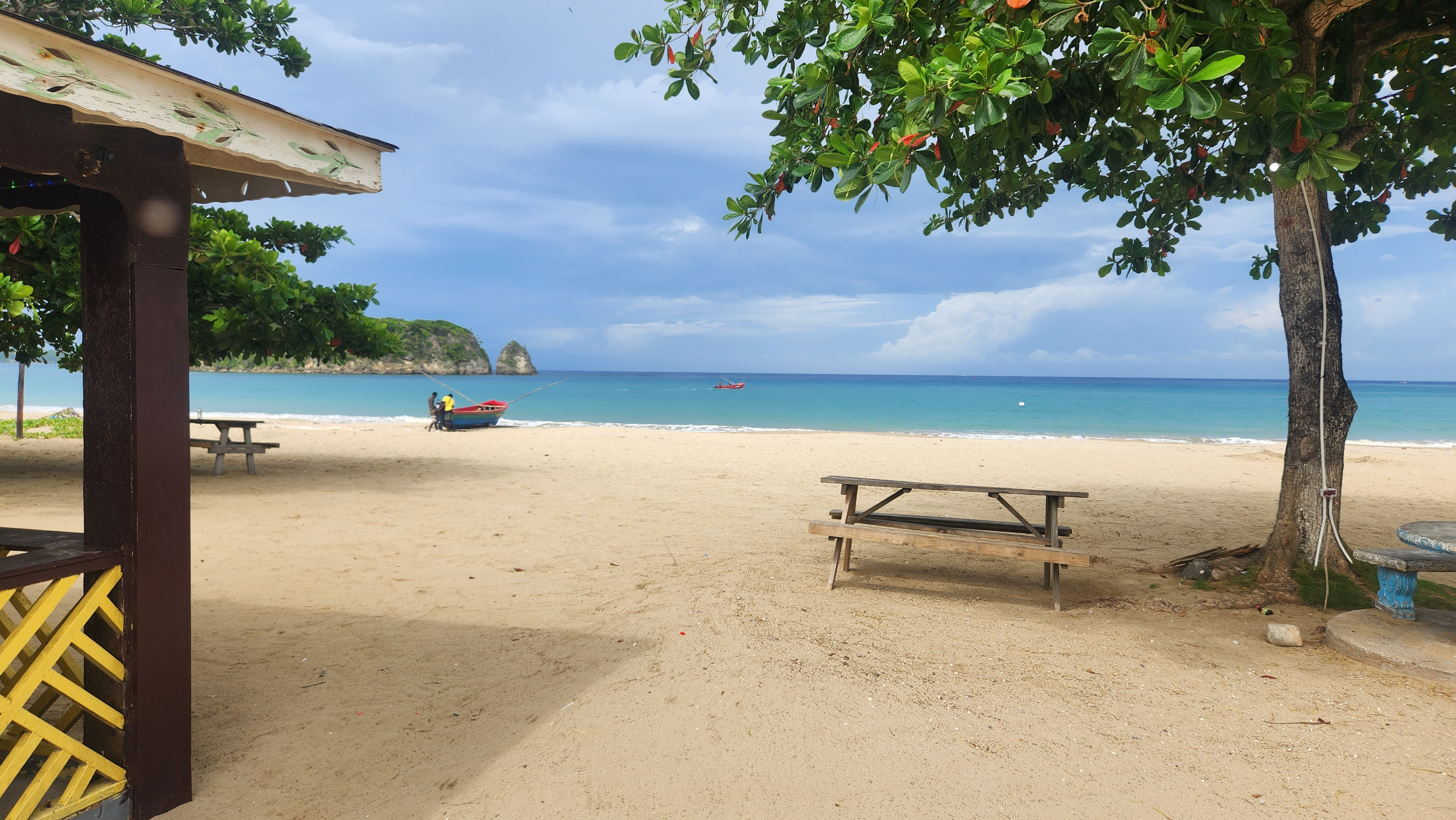
D'Shore beach club

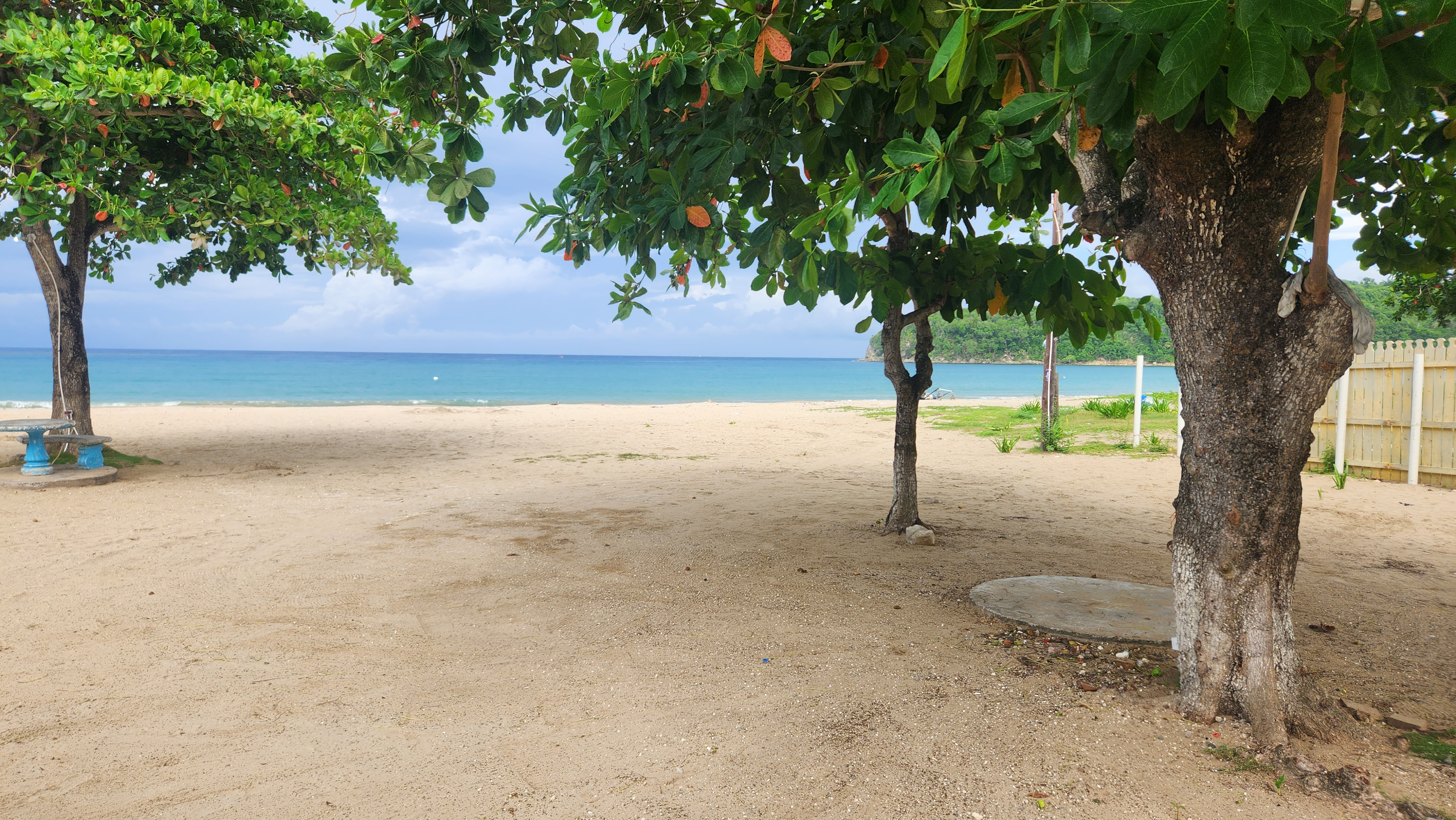
D'Shore beach club

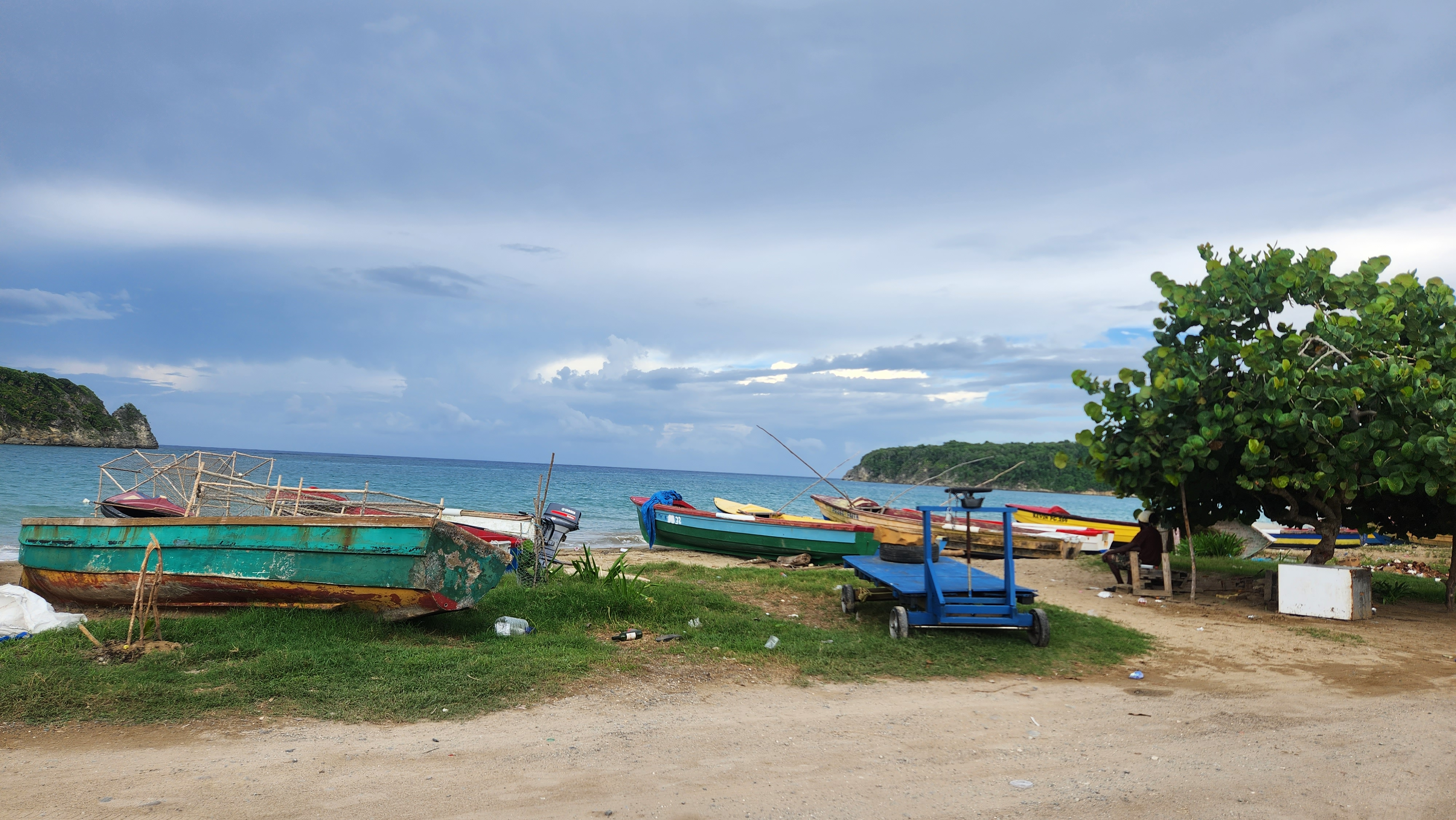
Pagee Fishing Boats

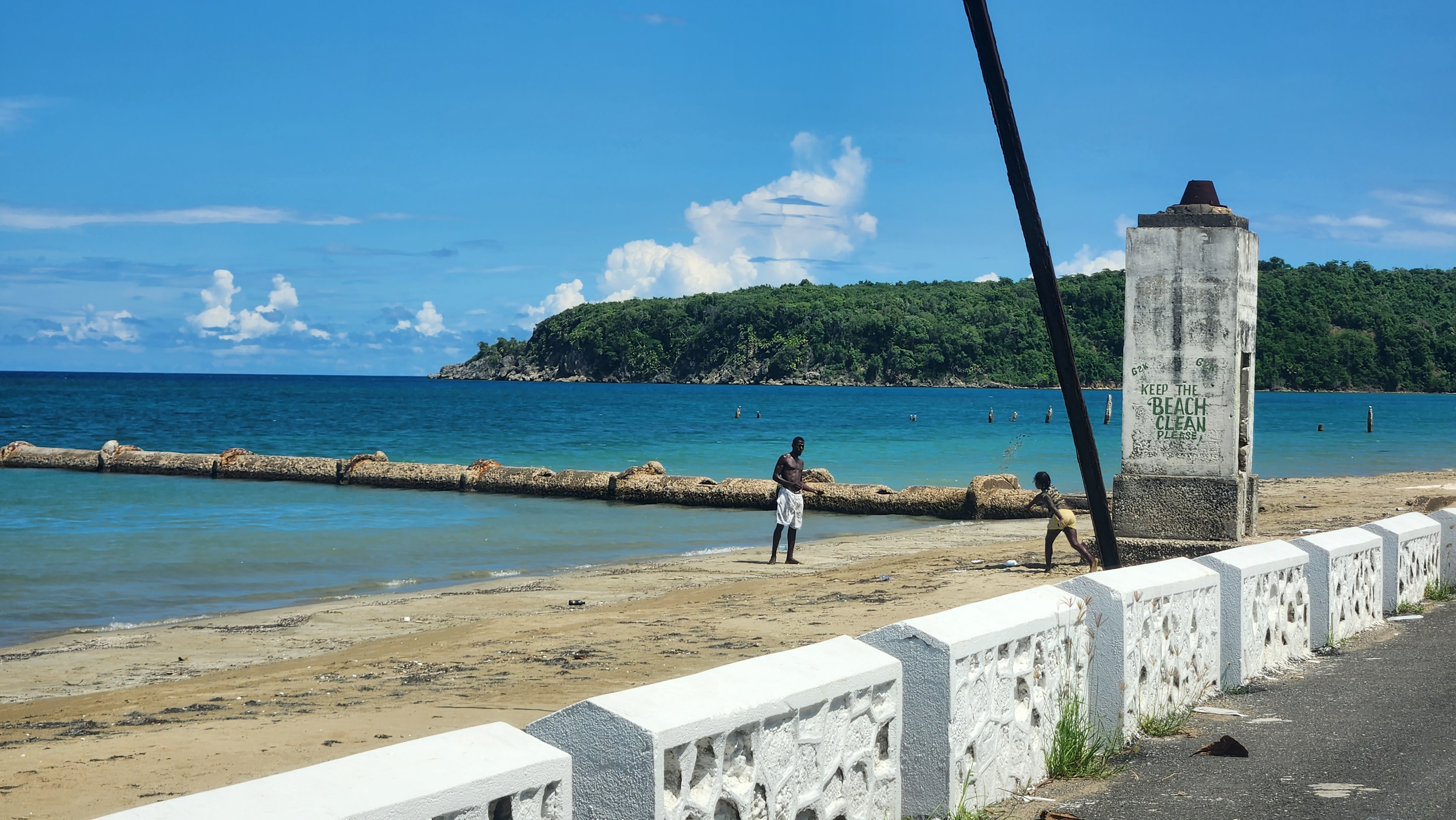
Pagee Beach

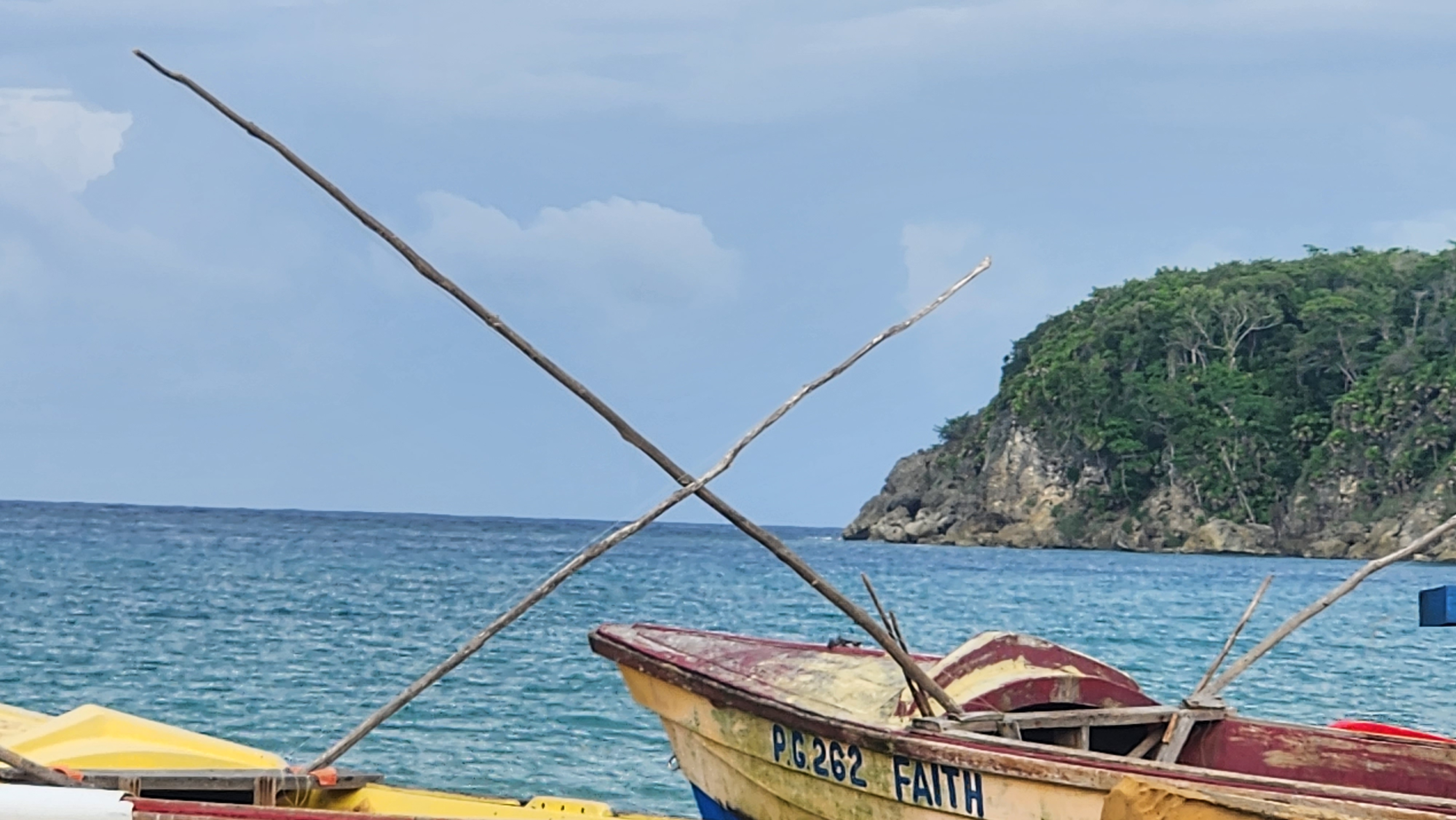
Pagee Fishing Boats

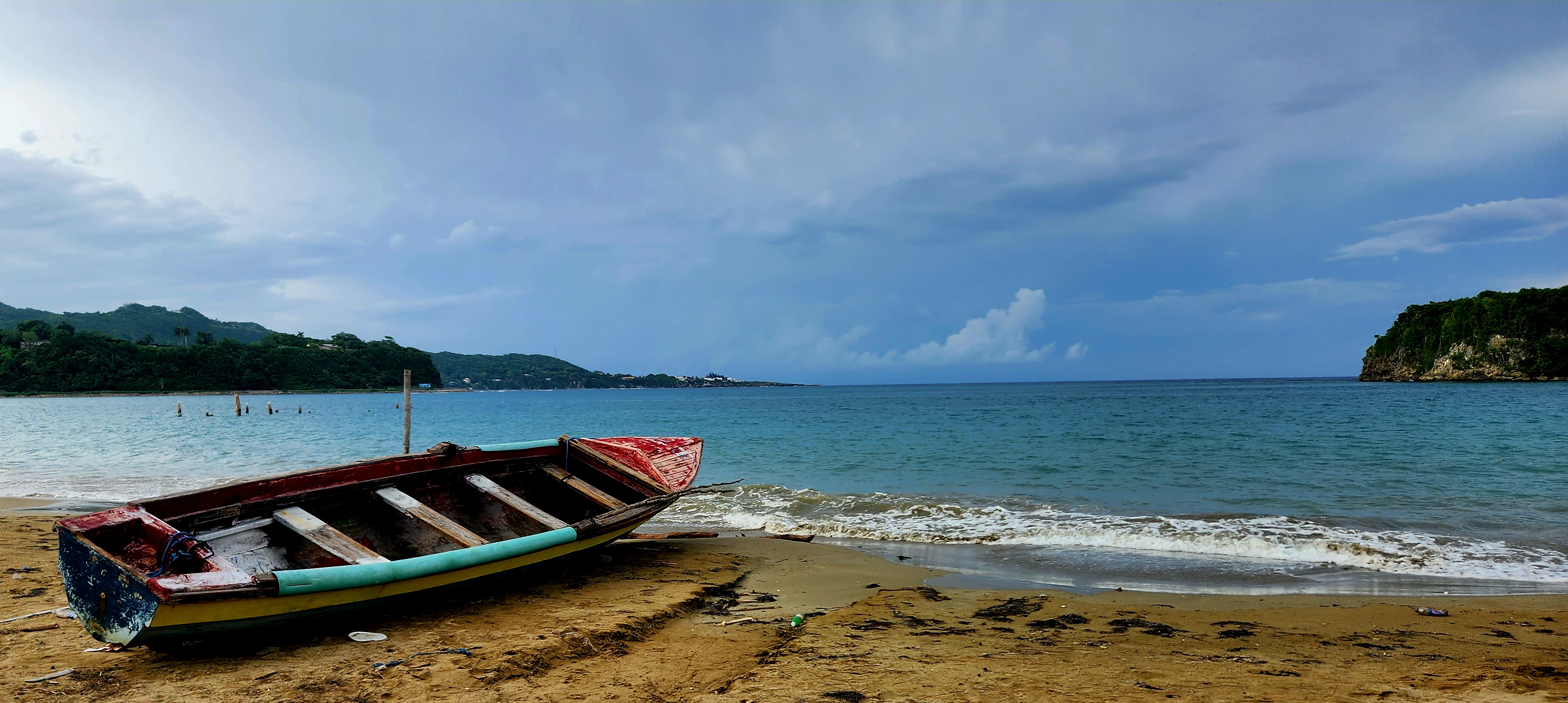
Pagee Fishing Boats

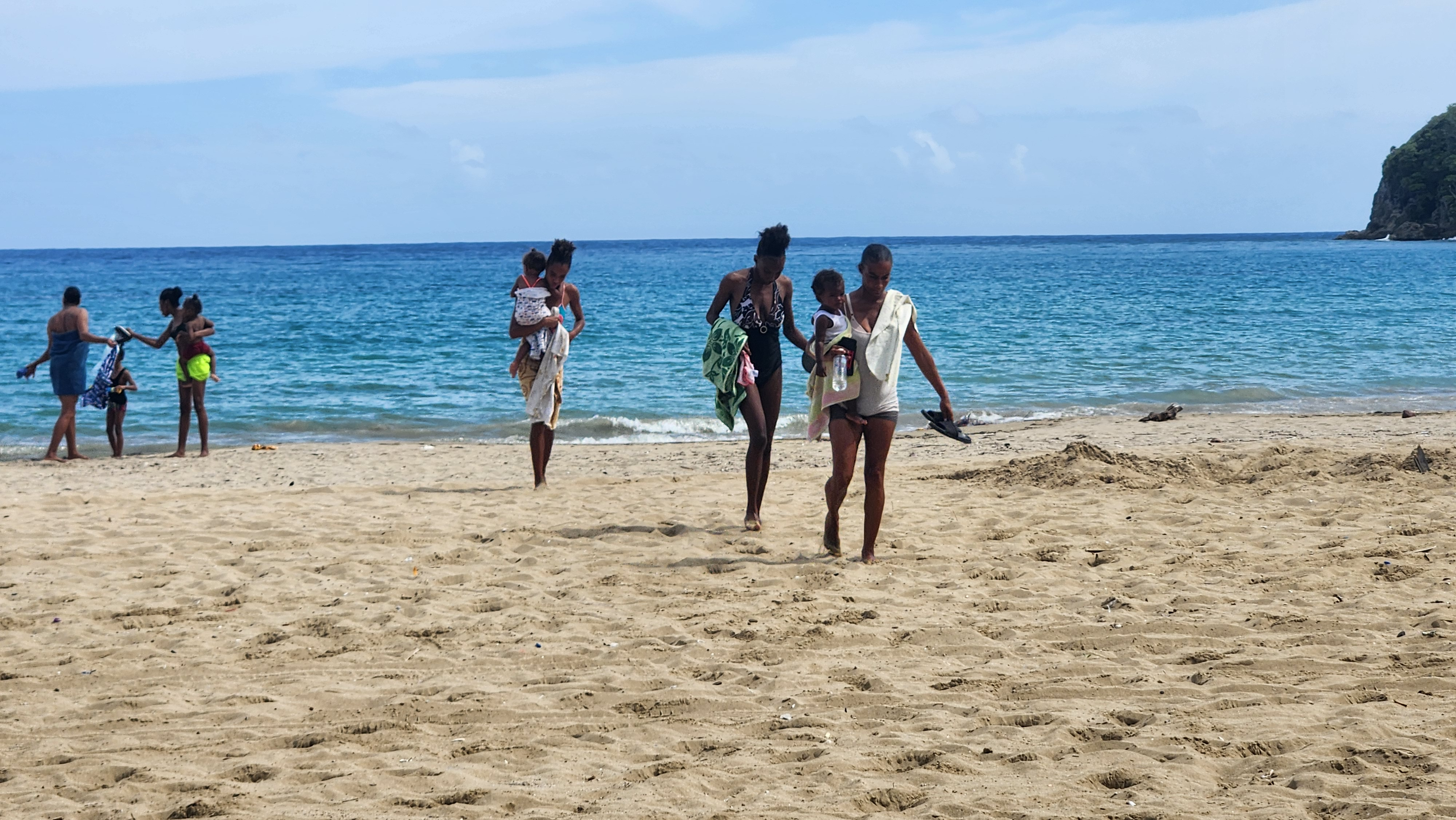
Pagee Public Beach

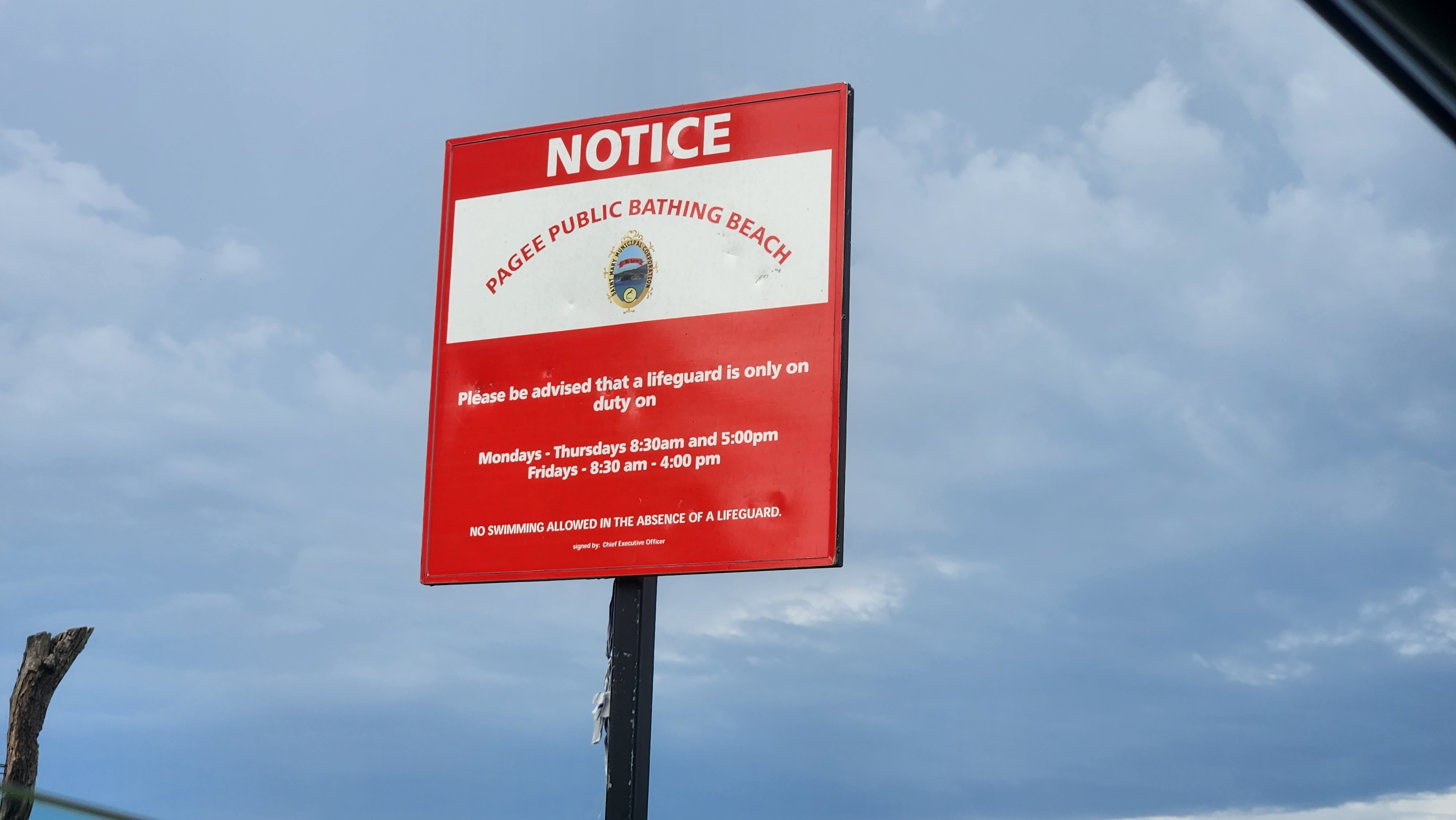
PageePublicBeach sign
