= James Robertson (surveyor) =

Scottish surveyor and cartographer

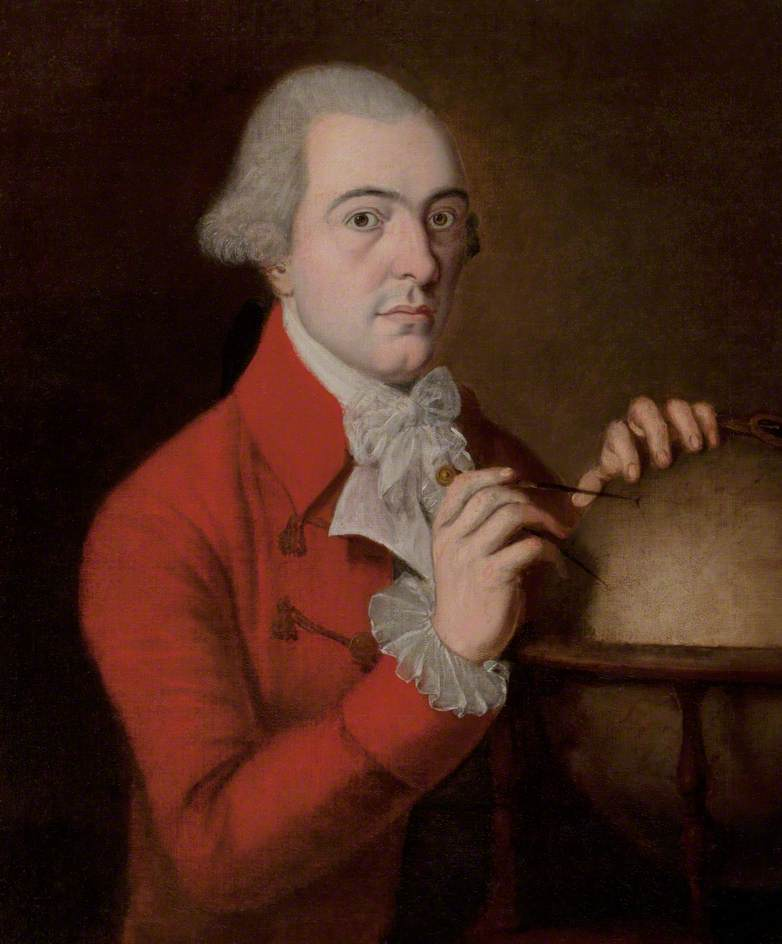
James Robertson of Gossabrough

James Robertson, FRS (1753–1829) was a Scottish surveyor and cartographer.

== Life ==
He was born on the island of Yell in the Shetland Islands north of mainland Scotland, the youngest of ten children to John Robertson, a relatively wealthy merchant.

His family moved to Aberdeen in his youth and he was educated at Aberdeen Grammar School then studied at Marischal College in Aberdeen, graduating MA in 1778.

He moved to Jamaica in 1778/9 and leased out cattle to plantation owners. He made maps from at least 1791. In 1796 he successfully lobbied the House of Assembly to commission him for three years to map the entire island. He completed his one inch to a mile series of maps in November 1799 and was further commissioned to create more detailed maps which he completed in 1801. For the task he was paid £10,450, an absolute fortune at that time. He then went to London to organise for the printing (and sale) of his maps, which were published in 1804. In London he lived in the Pall Mall area.

In December 1810 he was elected a Fellow of the Royal Society of London.

He unsuccessfully lobbied the Admiralty to commission the mapping of Orkney and Shetland, and unsuccessfully lobbied landowners to map Northumberland. However, he obtained a successful commission from local landowners to map Aberdeenshire. This was begun in 1810 but was not "completed" until 1822. But the commissioning group were less than happy with the result, which was proven to have multiple omissions. Robertson went to court in Edinburgh's High Court to receive the agreed payment but the issue remained unresolved at the point of his death in Edinburgh, on 15 January 1829.

By contrast, in the 1980s the Jamaican maps were compared against modern maps and found to be 98% accurate.
