= Jorge M. Pérez =

Argentine-American businessman

Jorge Pérez
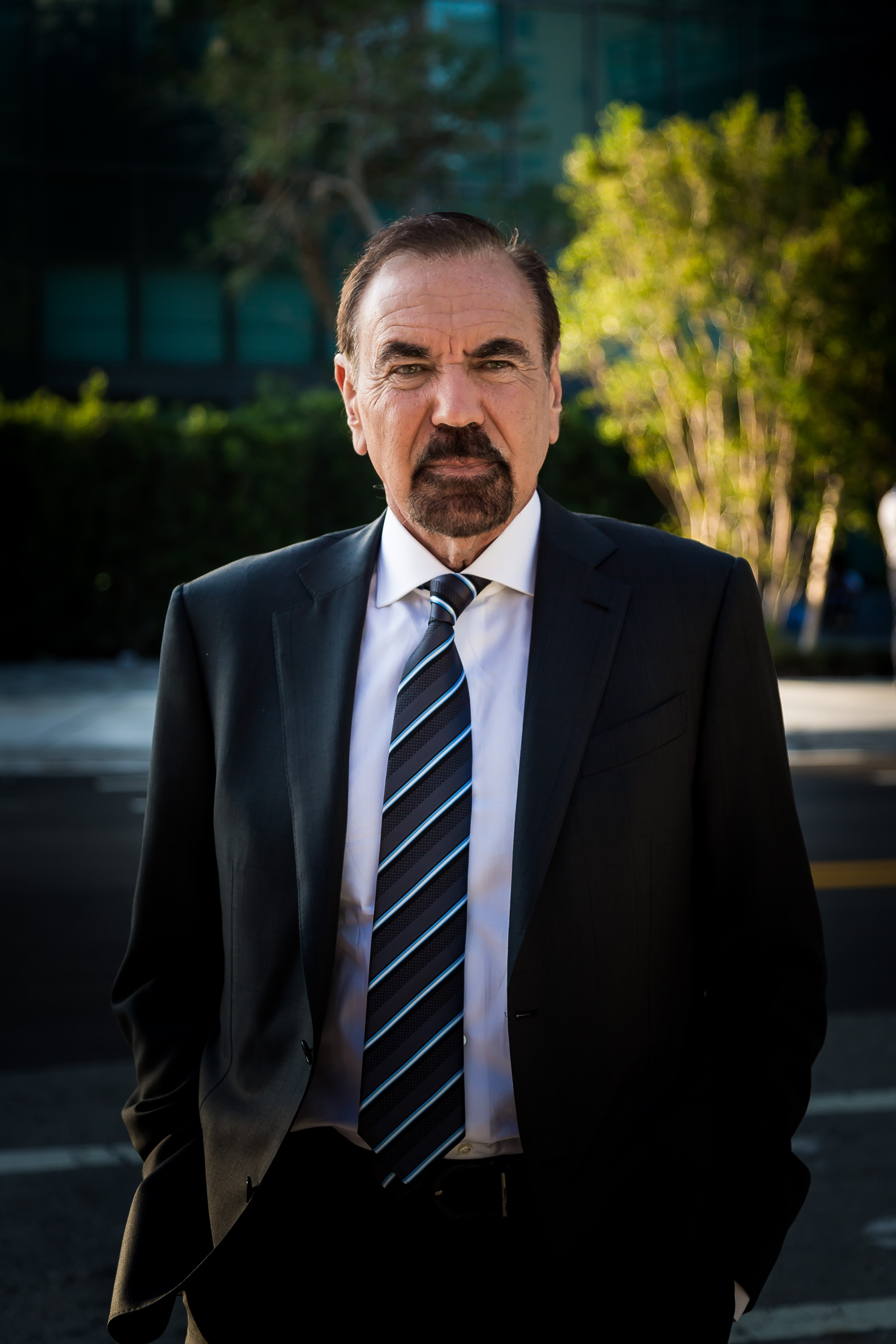
- Born: October 17, 1949 (age 76); Buenos Aires, Argentina
- Education: Long Island University, Post (BA); University of Michigan, Ann Arbor (MUP)
- Occupations: Businessman, investor, philanthropist, writer, economic development director
- Political party: Democratic
- Spouse: Darlene Pérez
- Children: 4

Jorge M. Pérez (born 17 October 1949) is an Argentine-American businessman, philanthropist, and art collector. He is the chairman and CEO of The Related Group, a Miami-based real estate development company, which he founded in 1979. The company develops and manages apartments across the United States and internationally. As of August 2025, Forbes estimated his net worth to be US$2.6 billion.

== Early life ==
Pérez was born on 17 October 1949 in Buenos Aires, Argentina, to Cuban parents of Spanish descent. In 1959, his family moved from Cuba to Bogotá, Colombia, where they lived for several years before relocating to Miami in 1968.

In 1972, Pérez graduated from LIU Post with a bachelor's degree in economics. He later obtained a master's degree in urban planning from the University of Michigan in 1976.

== Career ==
Pérez began his career as an Economic Development Director with the city of Miami.

In 1979, Pérez founded The Related Group in partnership with New York real estate developer Stephen M. Ross, initially focused on building and operating low-income, multi-family apartments in Miami. By the mid-1980s, the company had become the largest affordable housing builder in Florida.

Pérez later expanded into rental apartments and high-rise condo developments in the southern United States. Pérez has developed or owned 50 condo towers in South Florida, Fort Myers, and Las Vegas. During his career, he has built a $40 billion development portfolio with more than 120,000 residential units, primarily in South Florida. Half of his business comes from selling luxury units while the other 50 percent comes from rental apartments and affordable housing. He also has built luxury condos and rental apartments in Arizona, Georgia, and North Carolina while also developing projects in Brazil and Mexico. His projects have featured designs by architects and designers such as Philippe Starck, Cesar Pelli, and Rem Koolhaas.

According to the Hispanic Business 500, the Related Group had $2.1 billion in revenue in 2004.

Pérez has been a long-time member and supporter of the Democratic Party. Among his political activities, he participated in the Democratic Party's fundraising, advised former U.S. president Bill Clinton on Cuba, and contributed to the fundraising campaigns of two Democratic Party presidential candidates: Hillary Clinton and Barack Obama.

During the 2008 financial crisis, some of The Related Group's projects experienced financial difficulties as buyers defaulted or banks restricted lending. Pérez established a hedge fund to acquire distressed real estate. Forbes estimated his wealth at $1.3 billion before the 2008 financial crisis. As of March 2013, his wealth was estimated at $1.2 billion, coinciding with a resurgence in Florida real estate prices.

His firm has developed projects in Argentina, Brazil, Panama, Uruguay, and Mexico. Completed skyscraper condo projects include: 50 Biscayne, Icon Brickell, Icon South Beach, Murano at Portofino, and Paraiso Bay.

In 2008, the company finalized Icon Brickell, a three-tower urban development on the south side of the Miami River with more than 1,700 condominium units. In 2018, the Related Group finished Paraíso Bay, consisting of four towers and more than 1,300 condominium units in Miami's Edgewater neighborhood. In 2019, the company completed a 400-unit luxury apartment project in Tampa, Florida, while announcing plans for the construction of over 700 units in west Florida. In 2017, The Related Group opened an office in Dallas with plans for apartment development in Denver, Las Vegas, Phoenix, and major Texas markets. In 2018, The Related Group and Block Capital Group broke ground on the Bradley, a 175-unit apartment building in Miami featuring interior design by Kravitz Design. In 2018, The Related Group completed Icon Midtown, a high-rise apartment building in Atlanta, marking Pérez's first completed development in the state of Georgia. Wynwood 25, a partnership between Pérez and East End Capital, was scheduled for completion in 2019 and includes 289 rental apartments, ranging from 400 to 1,200 square feet. The Residences at 6 Fisher Island, a 50-unit ultra-luxury project on Fisher Island,Florida, will be completed in 2026.

== Art collecting and philanthropy ==
In December 2011, Pérez donated $35 million in cash and art to the Miami Art Museum to support the construction of its Herzog & de Meuron-designed building. The museum was subsequently renamed the Pérez Art Museum Miami (PAMM). In 2016, Pérez donated 200 works of Cuban contemporary art (valued at $5 million) from his collection to the museum, while pledging an additional $10 million donation to support the acquisition of works by Cuban and Latin American artists, as well as to grow the museum's endowment. His personal collection has more than 9,000 works. Furthermore, he has pledged to donate his entire collection to the museum after his death.

In 2019, Pérez opened El Espacio 23, a contemporary art space in the Allapattah neighborhood of Miami. The space hosts curated exhibitions from the Pérez Collection and offers free public admission, with apartments available for artist and curator residencies. In 2020, Pérez donated a dozen works by Latin American and U.S. Latino artists to Spain's national museum of modern art, the Museo Nacional Centro de Arte Reina Sofia.

In September 2021, Pérez donated $33 million to the Miami Foundation, an organization supporting arts, culture, education, and social justice in Miami. The donation came from the proceeds of the sale of his waterfront estate, Villa Cristina.

In April 2025, Pérez and his wife, Darlene, donated Joan Mitchell's triptych Iva to the Tate Modern in London. The couple also endowed a curatorial post at Tate for African art, and plan future donations of works by African and Latin American artists from their collection. In November 2025, the Pérez's also donated to the Tate a group of 36 important works by artists from across Africa and the African diaspora.

In 2026, Related Group was named a founding partner in Jackson Health Foundation's campaign for the new emergency room at Jackson Memorial Hospital.

As of 2026, the Pérez family has gifted more than $200 million through the Pérez Family Foundation and the Related Philanthropic Foundation.

== Personal life ==
Pérez resides in Miami, Florida, with his wife, Darlene Pérez. The couple has four children.

President Donald Trump wrote the foreword for Pérez's 2008 book, Powerhouse Principles. Despite collaborating with Trump on his book, Pérez later publicly criticized his presidency and policies.

== Selected works ==
- Powerhouse Principles: The Ultimate Blueprint for Real Estate Success in an Ever-Changing Market. New York: New American Library. 2008. ISBN 0-451-22705-0
