= Murano Grande at Portofino =

Residential skyscraper in Florida

Coordinates: 25.772843°N 80.140324°W

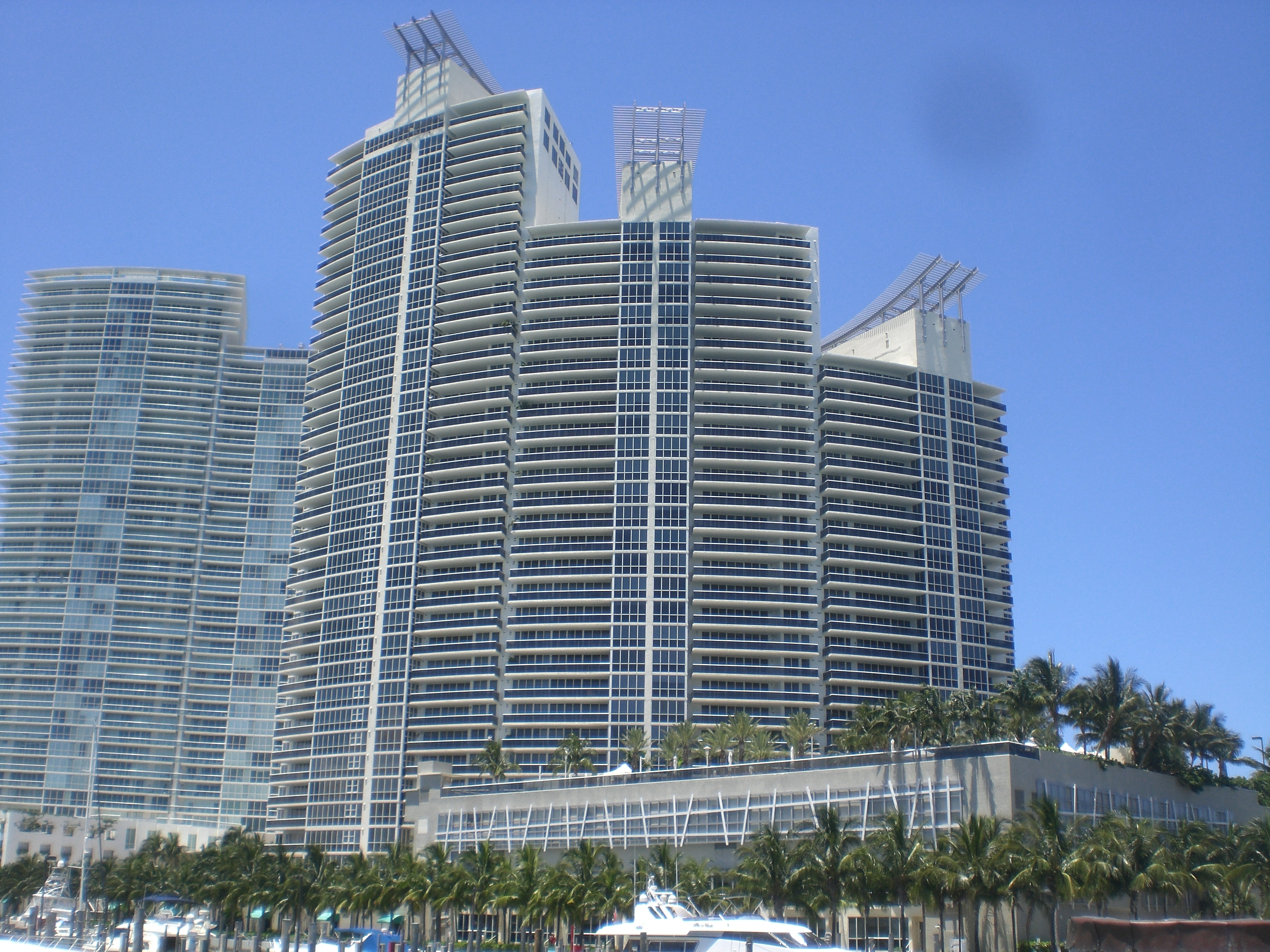

General information
- Address: 400 Alton Road; Miami Beach, FL 33139

Website
- https://muranogrande.info/

Murano Grande at Portofino is a residential enclave skyscraper in Miami Beach, Florida's South Beach. It is located directly on Biscayne Bay on the Miami Beach Marina. The tower opened in 2003, at 407 ft (124 m) tall and 37 floors. It is located in the SoFi (South of Fifth Street) neighborhood.

The building has three tiers, rising 25 floors, 31 floors, and 37 floors, consecutively and occupies 700 linear feet along Biscayne Bay. It is the seventh tallest skyscraper in Miami Beach.

Murano Grande was developed by Thomas Kramer's Portofino Group in partnership with the Related Group of Florida and designed by The Sieger Suarez Architectural Partnership, with interior design by the Rockwell Group.

Murano Grande is located on the southwesternmost edge of Miami Beach facing the Biscayne Bay to the west and Atlantic Ocean to the East. The Murano shares the main driveway ramp with neighboring condo ICON at South Beach.

== See also ==
- List of tallest buildings in Miami Beach
