= The Related Group =

Real estate company

The Related Group is a privately owned, real estate development company based in Miami, Florida, with projects and/or offices in Orlando, Tampa, Atlanta, Texas, Arizona, Las Vegas, Mexico, Argentina, Brazil, and Panama. The company founder is Jorge M. Pérez.

== History ==
The Related Group was launched in 1979 as a builder of affordable housing. Pérez teamed up with New York developer Stephen Ross in 1979 to start the company, and over the following decades, expanded to developing mixed-use luxury condominiums, hotels, commercial spaces and rental apartment buildings incorporating extensive amenities and museum quality art into sophisticated living and working environments.

Pérez was an economic development director with the City of Miami before he entered the development business. The firm became the largest affordable housing builder in Florida by the middle of the decade and subsequently one of the largest multifamily, luxury residential developers in the Southeastern United States.

Related Group has built projects in Argentina, Brazil, Panama, Uruguay and Mexico. The company has many completed skyscraper condo projects including 50 Biscayne, Icon Brickell, Icon South Beach, Murano at Portofino and Paraiso Bay.

In 2017, the company commenced work on a 400-unit luxury apartment project in Tampa, Florida, and also plans to build more than 700 units in West Florida. The Related Group opened an office in 2017 in Dallas with plans to build apartments in Las Vegas, Phoenix, and other major Texas markets. The Related Group opened Icon Midtown, a high-rise apartment in the Midtown section of Atlanta, in 2018.

== Art collection ==
The Related Group owns an art collection which consists mostly of international contemporary art. Currently, at over 700 objects, the pieces in the collection, including drawings, paintings, sculptures and installations, range in scale from intimate to large format.

The Related Group acquires art specifically for placement within its condo projects. The company often puts original works in prominent locations while selecting less expensive lithographs for secondary locations. Art is included in the common areas of projects in every division of the company: condo, apartment and urban.
