= Portofino (disambiguation) =

Portofino is a village and resort in Italy.

Portofino may also refer to:

- Portofino (musical), a 1958 Broadway musical
- Lamborghini Portofino, a 1987 concept car developed for Lamborghini
- Ferrari Portofino, a grand tourer produced by Ferrari since 2018
- Portofino Tower, a 1997 residential skyscraper in Miami Beach, Florida
