= Blackstone Hotel (disambiguation) =

The Blackstone Hotel is a landmark in Chicago, Illinois.

Blackstone Hotel may also refer to:

- Blackstone Hotel (Long Beach, California), a City of Long Beach historic landmark
- The Blackstone, a hotel in Miami Beach, Florida
- Blackstone Hotel (Kansas City, Missouri), a National Register of Historic Places listing in Downtown Kansas City
- Blackstone Hotel (Omaha, Nebraska)
- Blackstone Hotel (Fort Worth, Texas)
