= Icon Bay =

Residential tower in Miami, Florida

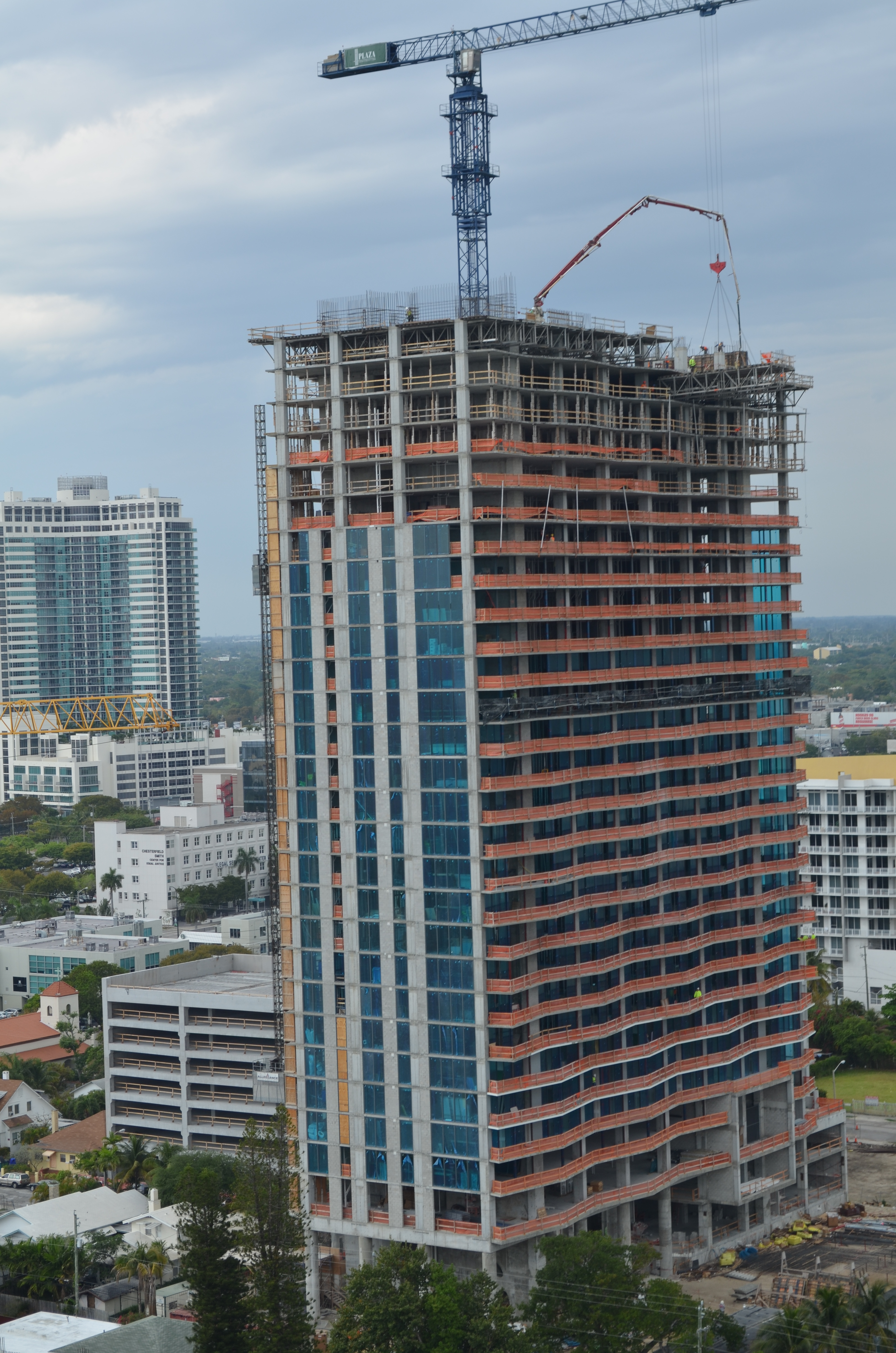
- U/C in 2014
- Interactive map of the Icon Bay area

General information
- Status: Completed
- Type: Residential
- Location: 460 NE 28th Street, Miami, Florida, United States
- Coordinates: 25.8035984°N 80.1871881°W
- Construction started: 2013
- Completed: 2015

Height
- Height: 494 feet (150.6 m)

Technical details
- Floor count: 42

Design and construction
- Architect: Bernardo Fort-Brescia
- Developer: The Related Group
- Main contractor: Plaza Construction Group

Icon Bay is a residential high-rise in the Edgewater neighborhood of Miami, Florida, containing about 300 units over 42 floors. In return for using the end of a city of Miami owned street where it meets Biscayne Bay, the project design approved included a small public park as appeasement. In 2016, the building was awarded sixth place in the Emporis best new skyscraper annual awards.

== Design ==
The developer designed the building so that each unit can be cross-ventilated. Each unit has 2-3 frontages in order to achieve this. The balconies are designed with a zig-zag pattern which: the design element invites more light into the apartments.

The building has 300 one, two and three bedroom apartment/units.

== See also ==
- List of tallest buildings in Miami
