= List of tallest buildings in Miami Beach =

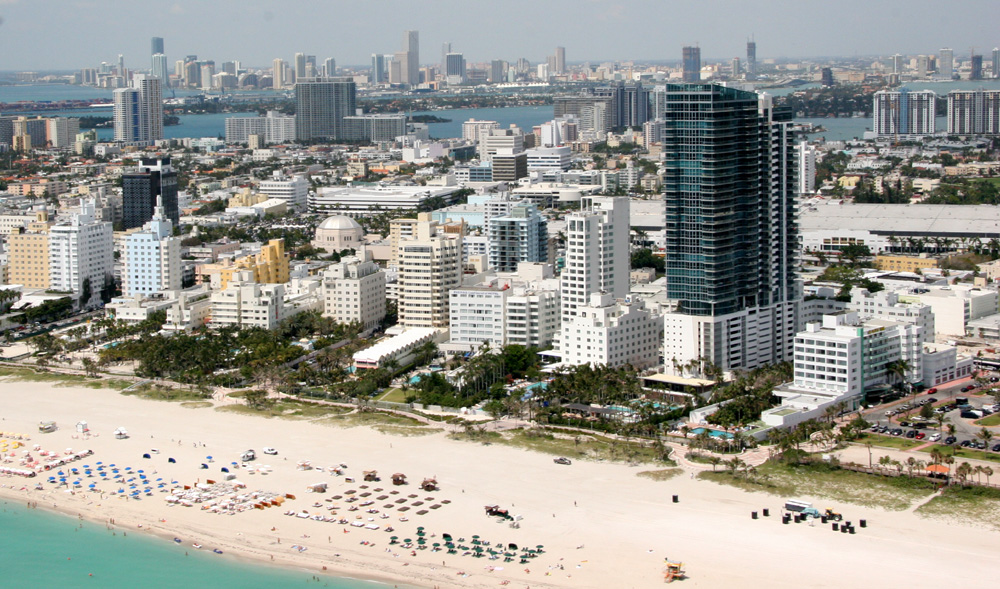
Small portion of the Miami Beach skyline as seen from the Atlantic Ocean 2006 with The Setai Miami Beach visible to the right.

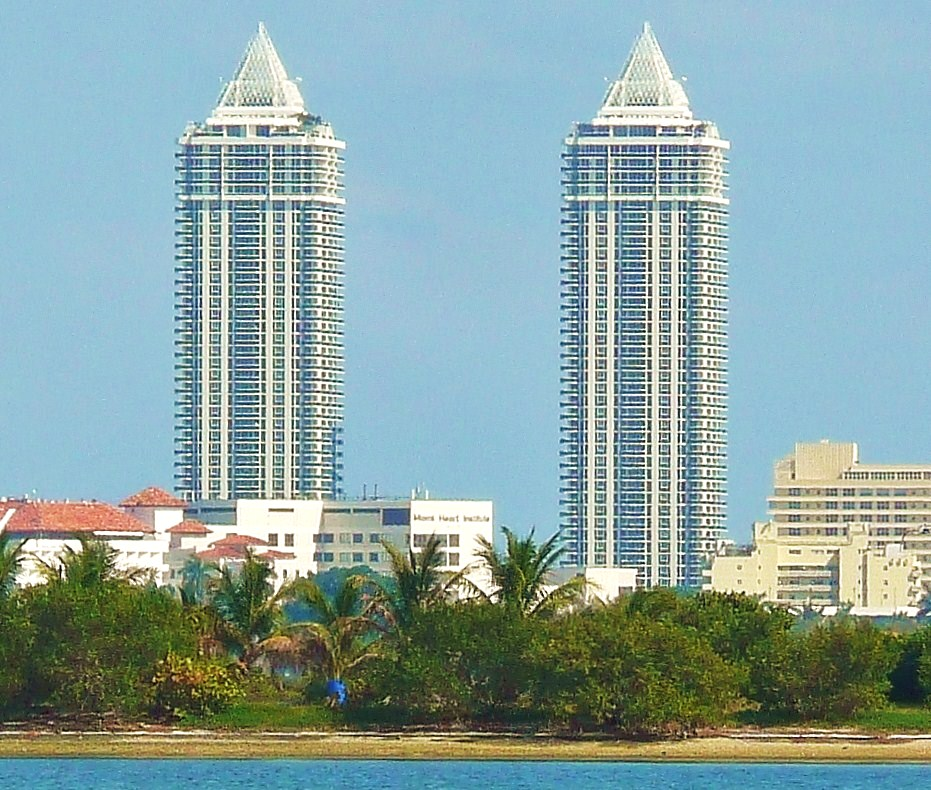
Blue and Green Diamond, the tallest buildings in Miami Beach

This list of tallest buildings in Miami Beach ranks skyscrapers in the city of Miami Beach, Florida by height. The tallest completed building in Miami Beach is the Blue and Green Diamond, twin towers which both stand 559 ft (170 m) tall and contain 44 floors.

Miami Beach's history of skyscrapers began in 1929 with the completion of The Blackstone. Back then, the hotel was the tallest building in Miami Beach, at 157 feet (48 m) tall. For more than five decades between 1940 and 1995, Miami beach went on a skyscraper hiatus, with few buildings taller than 200 feet (61 m) constructed. However, since 1995, Miami Beach has gone on a construction boom, as many of the city's skyscrapers were completed between 1995 and present. Thomas Kramer is well known for the negotiations with local government that allowed the building of the tallest towers in the Miami Beach Area. No Miami Beach buildings are among the tallest in the United States, but the city is home to four buildings at least 492 feet (150 m). Overall, Miami Beach's skyline (based on number of skyscrapers over 300 feet (91 m) ranks 2nd in the state of Florida, (behind Miami).

The tallest building in Miami Beach are currently the Blue and Green Diamond, 44-story twin towers located at 4779 Collins Avenue.

== Tallest buildings ==
This lists ranks Miami Beach buildings that stand at least 200 feet (61 m) tall, based on standard height measurement. This includes spires and architectural details but does not include antenna masts. Existing structures are included for ranking purposes based on present height.

Rank	Name	Image	Height ft / m	Floors	Year	Notes
1=	Green Diamond		559 / 170	44	2000	
1=	Blue Diamond		559 / 170	44	2000	
2	Five Park		548 / 167	43	2024	Completed in November 2024.
4	Akoya Condominium		492 / 150	47	2004	Also known as White Diamond.
5	Portofino Tower		484 / 148	44	1997	Tallest building completed in the 1990s.
6	Continuum on South Beach, South Tower		471 / 143	43	2002	
7	Fontainebleau Tower Suites		434 / 132	36	2005	
8	Icon at South Beach		423 / 129	42	2008	
9	Continuum on South Beach, North Tower		412 / 126	37	2008	
10	Murano Grande at Portofino		407 / 124	37	2003	
11	Murano at Portofino		402 / 123	37	2001	
12	Carillon Residences North Tower		397 / 121	39	2008	Also known as the Canyon Ranch North Tower. Part of the Canyon Ranch Miami Beach complex.
13	The Setai Hotel and Residences		386 / 118	38	2004	
14	The Waverly at South Beach		358 / 109	36	2001	
15	La Gorce Palace		345 / 105	34	1996	
16	The Yacht Club at Portofino		341 / 104	38	1999	
17	Flamingo Point		338 / 103	32	2001	
18	The Floridian		337 / 103	33	1997	
19	La Tour		292 / 89	26	1995	
20	Loews Miami Beach Hotel		272 / 83	16	1998	
21	The Grand Venetian		271 / 83	26	2002	
22	Bentley Bay South Tower		259 / 79	26	2005	
23	Canyon Ranch South Tower		255 / 78	22	2008	Part of the Canyon Ranch Miami Beach complex.
24	Bentley Bay North Tower		243 / 74	24	2005	
25	Ritz Plaza Hotel		204 / 62	12	1940	Tallest building completed in the 1940s.
26	Shore Club Hotel		200 / 61	18	1938	Tallest building completed in the 1930s.
27	Miami Beach Federal Building		148 / 45	13	1956	Also known as 407 Building.

== Timeline of tallest buildings ==
bentley miami residences

Name	Street address 18401 Collins Avenue, Sunny Isles Beach, Miami FL 33160	Years as tallest	Height feet / m	Floors	References
The Blackstone	800 Washington Avenue	1929–1936	157 / 48	13	
The Tides	1220 Ocean Drive	1936–1938	161 / 49	10	
Shore Club Hotel	1901 Collins Avenue	1938–1940	200 / 61	19	
Ritz Plaza Hotel	1701 Collins Avenue	1940–1970	204 / 62	12	
5660 Condominiums	5660 Collins Avenue	1970–1982	220 / 67	22	
Club Atlantis Condominiums	2555 Collins Avenue	1982–1987	240 / 73	24	
South Pointe Tower	400 South Pointe Drive	1987–1995	260 / 79	25	
La Tour	4201 Collins Avenue	1995–1996	292 / 89	26	
La Gorce Palace	6301 Collins Avenue	1996–1997	345 / 105	34	
Portofino Tower	300 South Pointe Drive	1997–2000	484 / 148	44	
Green Diamond	4775 Collins Avenue	2000–present	558 / 170	44	
Blue Diamond	4779 Collins Avenue	2000–present	559 / 170	44	

== See also ==
- List of tallest buildings in Florida
- List of tallest buildings in Fort Lauderdale
- List of tallest buildings in Jacksonville
- List of tallest buildings in Miami
- List of tallest buildings in Orlando
- List of tallest buildings in St. Petersburg
- List of tallest buildings in Sunny Isles Beach
- List of tallest buildings in Tampa
- List of tallest buildings in Tallahassee
