= Kathryn Schotthoefer =

American film and television executive

- Occupation: Film and television executive

Kathryn Schotthoefer is an American film and television executive. She founded Original Media Ventures, a studio focused on developing film and TV projects from underrepresented creative voices in 2017 and launched REPRESENT, a community to offer support, education, and opportunities for storytellers, in 2018. She previously worked for entertainment companies including Twentieth Century Fox, New Line Cinema, Warner Bros., and was the former president of M&C Saatchi company, Heavenspot. She is a vocal advocate for human rights and civil rights, particularly in regards to refugee humanitarian efforts. In 2016, she was awarded the Global Gift Foundation Philanthropreneur Award, an honor previously awarded to Victoria Beckham and Jorge Perez. She is a native of Bloomfield Hills, Michigan and resides in Los Angeles, California.
