= Jennifer Horev =

American businesswoman

- Born: July 1990 (age 35–36); Chicago, United States
- Occupations: Businesswoman; restaurateur
- Known for: Founder of the Pura Vida Miami restaurant chain
- Spouse: Omer Horev (m. 2018)

Jennifer Horev (born July 27, 1990) is an American businesswoman. She is a co-founder and chief brand officer of Pura Vida Miami.

== Early life ==
Horev was born in Chicago and grew up in Weston, Florida. Her grandparents owned a restaurant in Skokie. She earned a Bachelor of Science in marketing from the University of Florida.

== Career ==
In her early career, Horev worked as a real estate broker. She met her husband Omer in 2014 during a real estate transaction.

In 2015; Horev joined Pura Vida Miami, a year after the restaurant was incorporated. She led the redesign of the franchise's locations.

== Personal life ==
Horev married Omer in 2018.
