= Canyon Ranch Miami Beach =

Condominium complex in Miami Beach, Florida, US

The Carillon Hotel & Spa North Tower
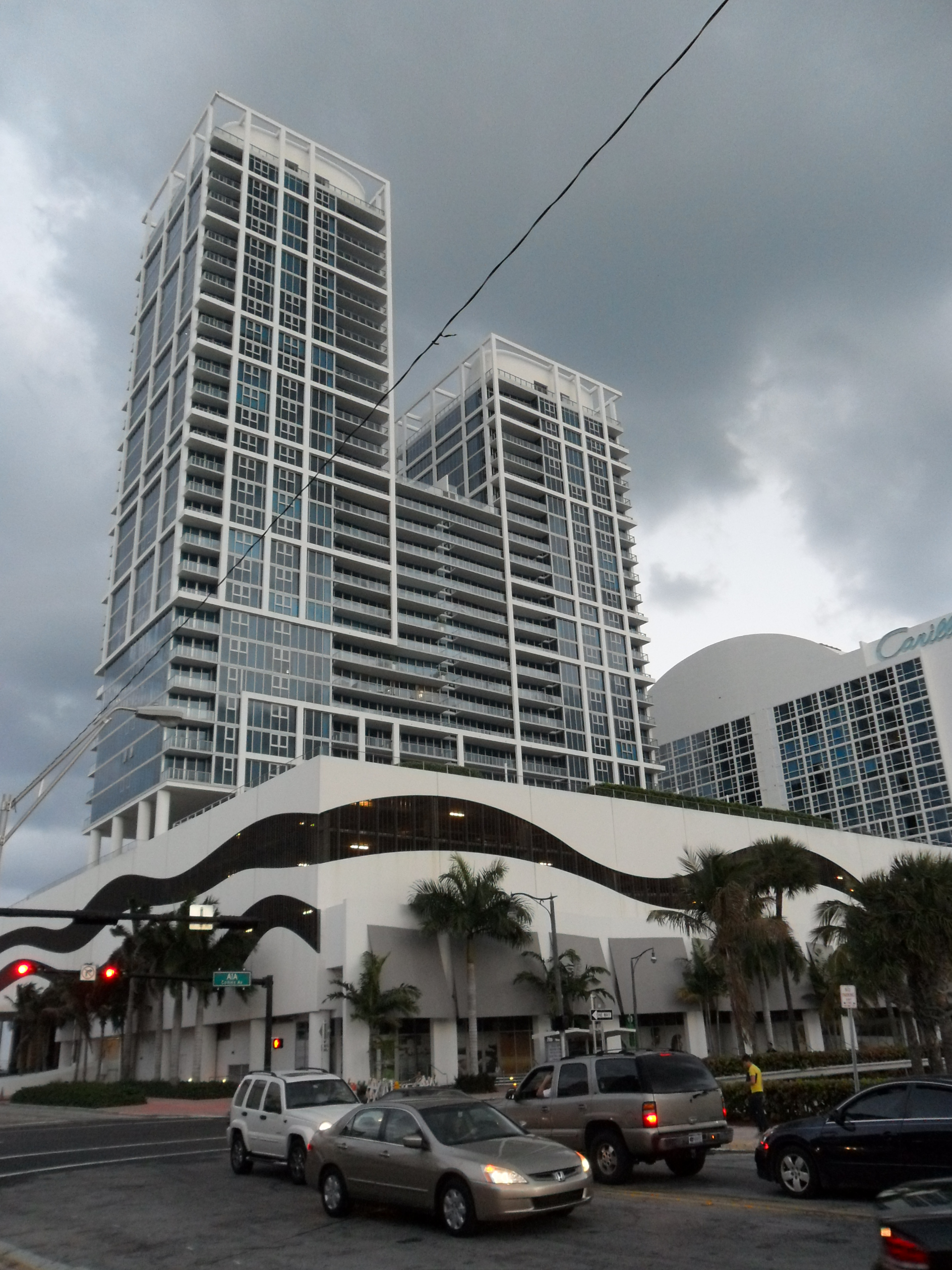
- The Carillon Hotel & Spa North Tower from 69th Street
- Interactive map of the The Carillon Hotel & Spa North Tower area

General information
- Type: Hotel, Residential
- Location: 6801 Collins Avenue, Miami Beach, Florida, United States
- Coordinates: 25°51′14″N 80°7′11″W
- Construction started: 2004
- Completed: 2008
- Opening: 2008

Height
- Roof: 397 ft (121 m)

Technical details
- Floor count: 37

Design and construction
- Architect: Arquitectonica
- Developer: WSG Development

The Carillon Hotel & Spa South Tower
- Interactive map of the The Carillon Hotel & Spa South Tower area

General information
- Type: Hotel, Residential
- Location: 6801 Collins Avenue, Miami Beach, Florida, United States
- Opening: 2008

Height
- Roof: 257 ft (78 m)

Technical details
- Floor count: 22

Design and construction
- Architect: Arquitectonica
- Developer: WSG Development

The Carillon Hotel & Spa, and the Carillon Residences, formerly known as Canyon Ranch Miami Beach, is a complex of three high rise luxury condominiums in North Beach, Miami Beach, Florida, United States. It is located on the beachfront on the east side of Collins Avenue between 68th and 69th Streets. The Carillon Hotel & Spa complex includes The Carillon Hotel & Spa North Tower, the 20 floor The Carillon Hotel & Spa South Tower, The Carillon Hotel building located between The Carillon Hotel & Spa Towers on Collins Avenue, as well as the proposed Golden Sands Canyon Ranch proposed to be built north of The Carillon Hotel & Spa North Tower. The old Golden Sands Hotel and Lounge is being demolished to make way for the new Golden Sands building. The 15-story Carillion Hotel building was built in 1955 but was vacant for 15 years until it was renovated in 2007 and became part of the Canyon Ranch complex. The 22 floor The Carillon Hotel & Spa South Tower is 257 feet (78 meters) tall and was completed in 2008. The tallest building, the north tower of The Carillon Hotel & Spa is 37 floors and 121 meters (397 feet) tall, was completed in 2008 and is one of the tallest buildings in Miami Beach. The Carillon Hotel & Spa North Tower looks like two separate, connected towers, but both are the North Tower building.

== Gallery ==
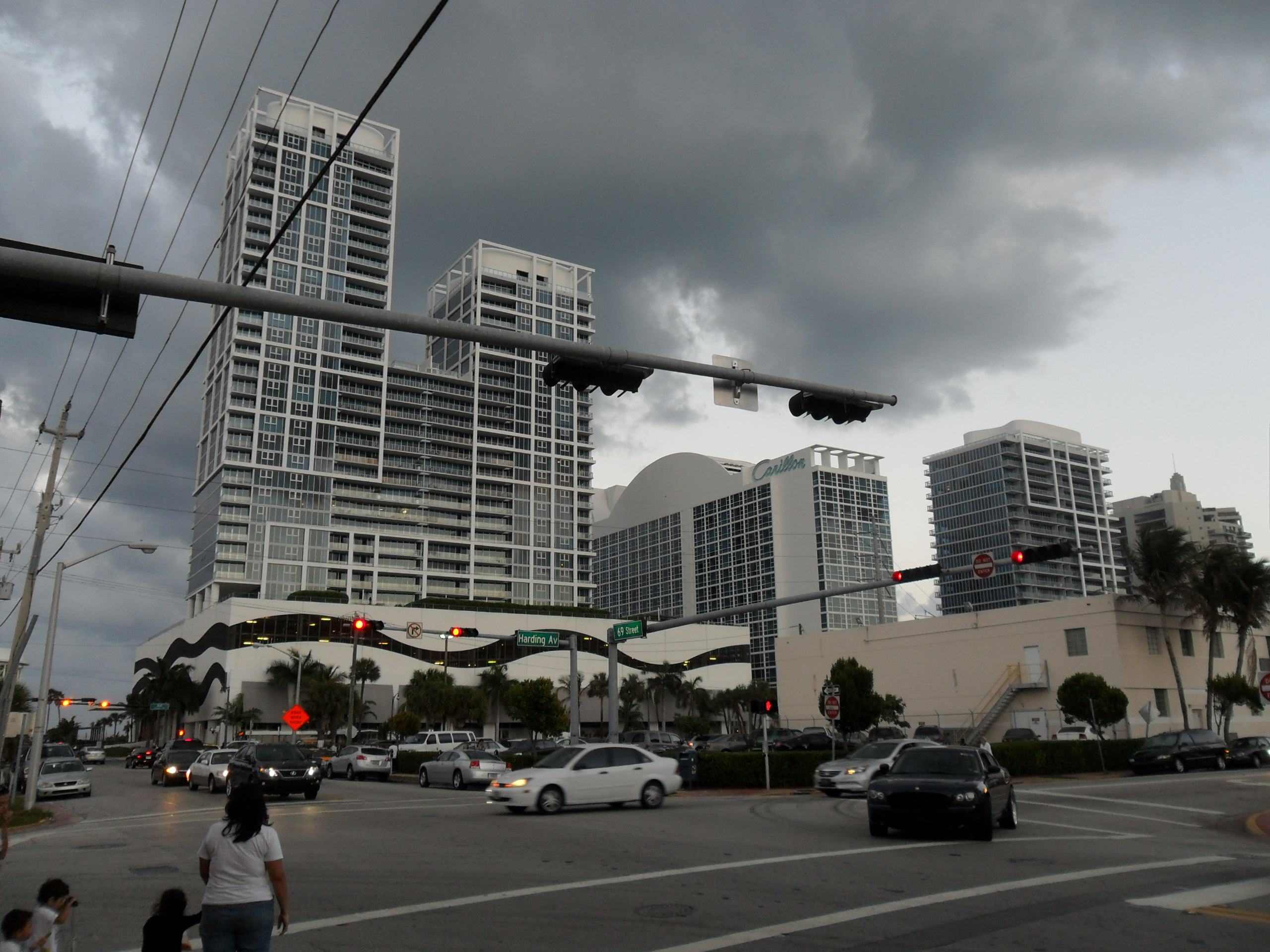
From left to right, The Carillon Hotel & Spa North Tower, Carillion Residences, Canyon Ranch South Tower

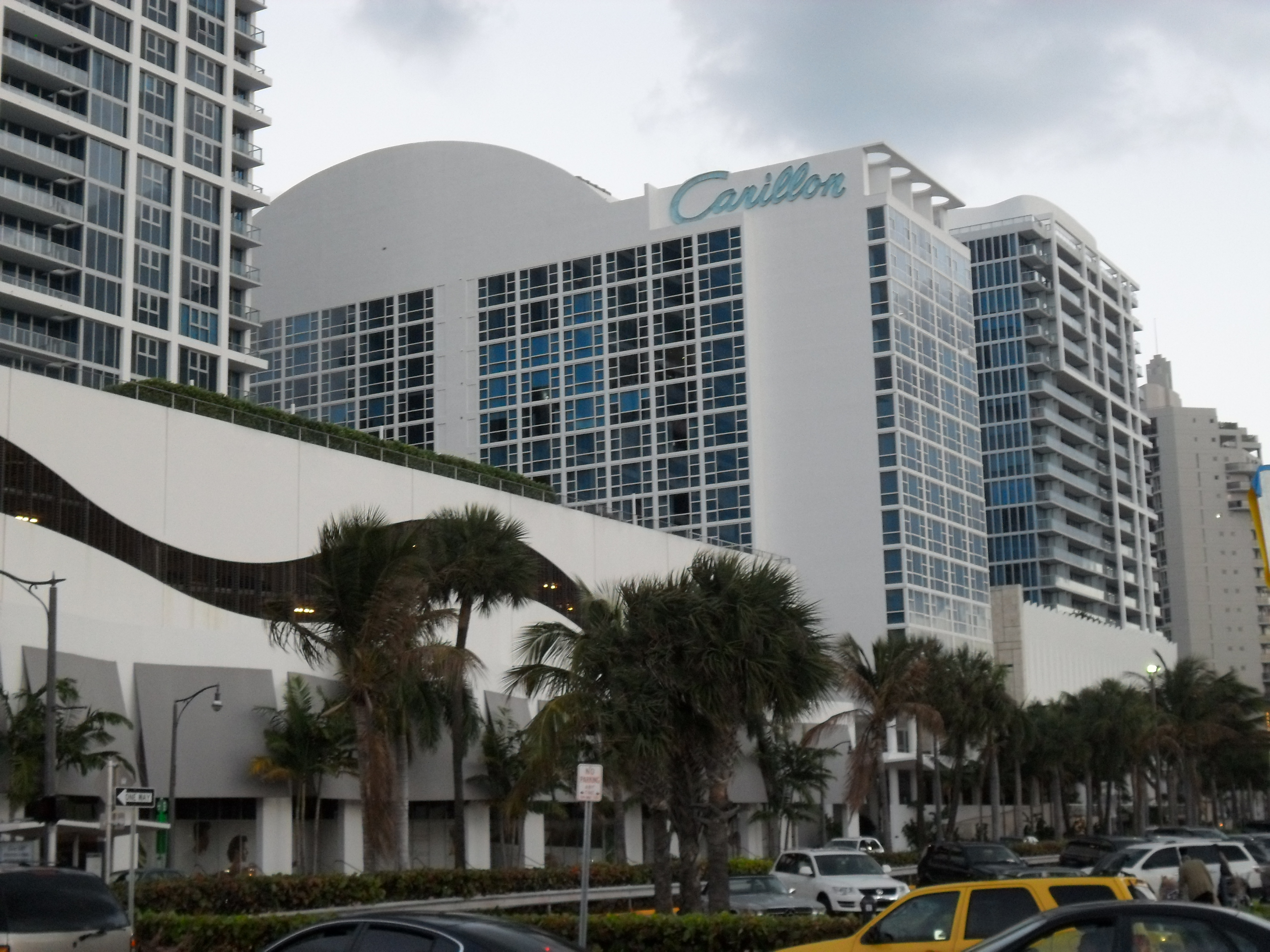
Carillion Hotel, built in 1955

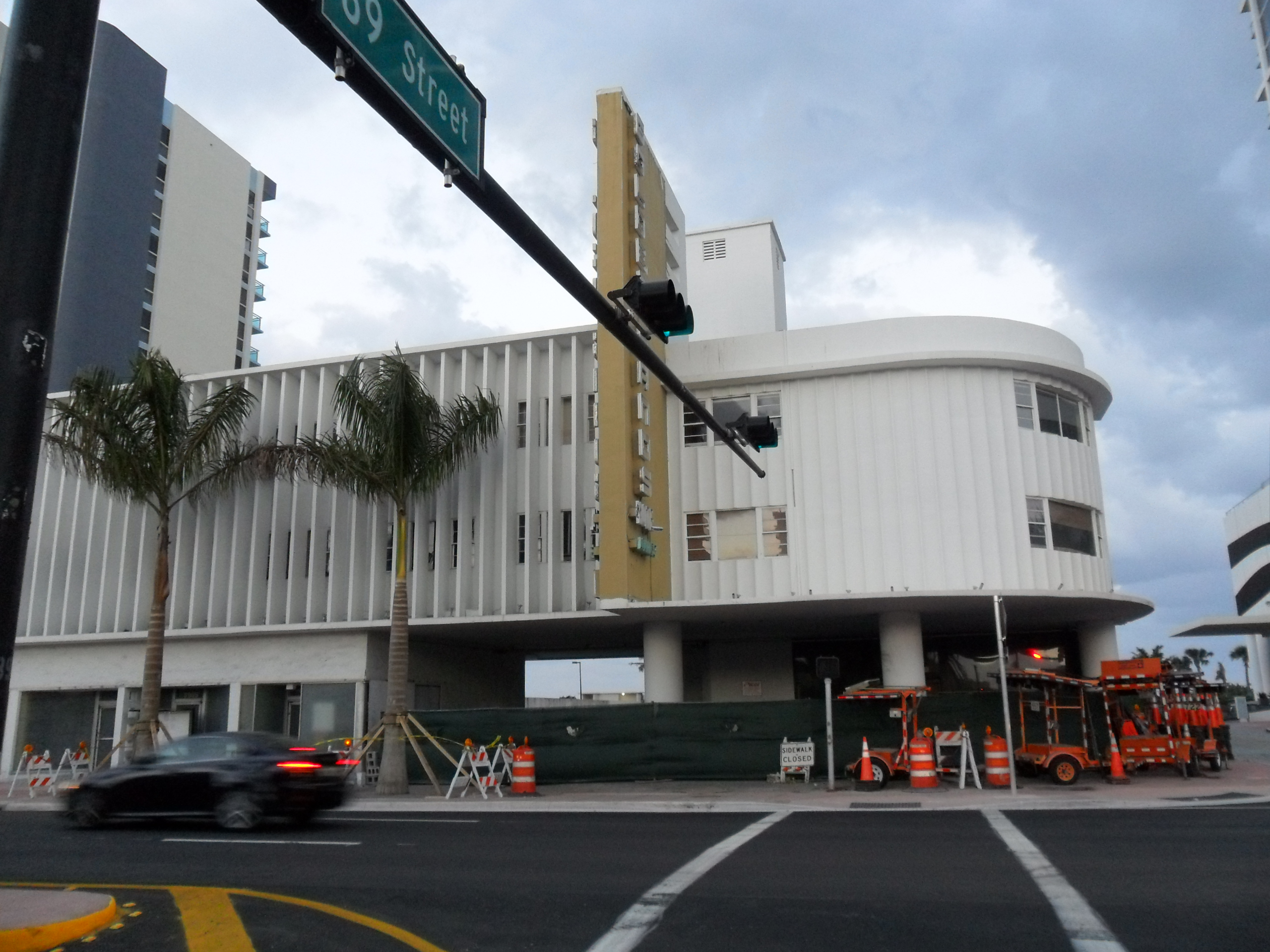
Historic Golden Sands Hotel & Lounge under demolition on the Golden Sands Canyon Beach site

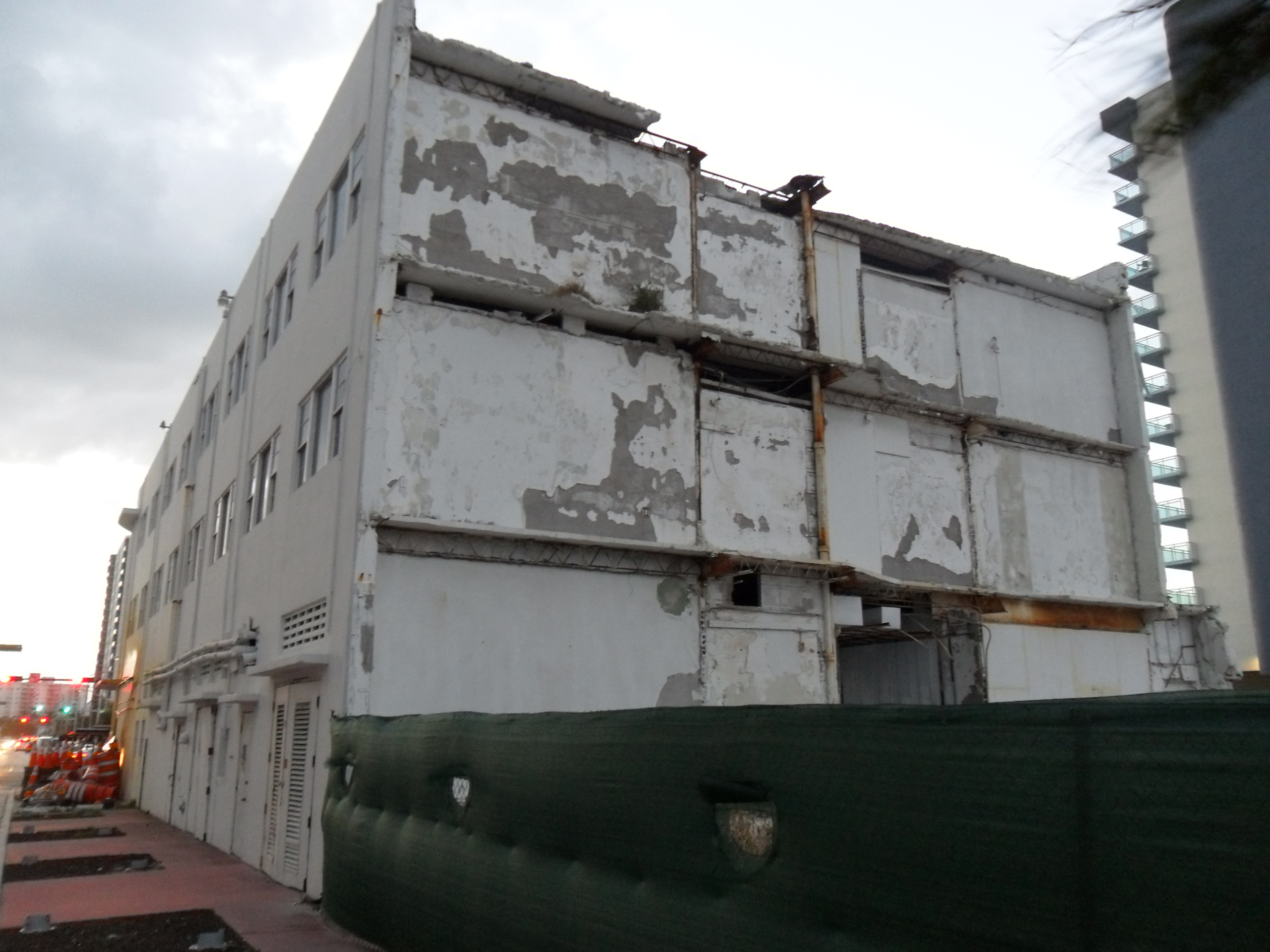
Back of the Golden Sands Hotel demolition suspended (March 2011)

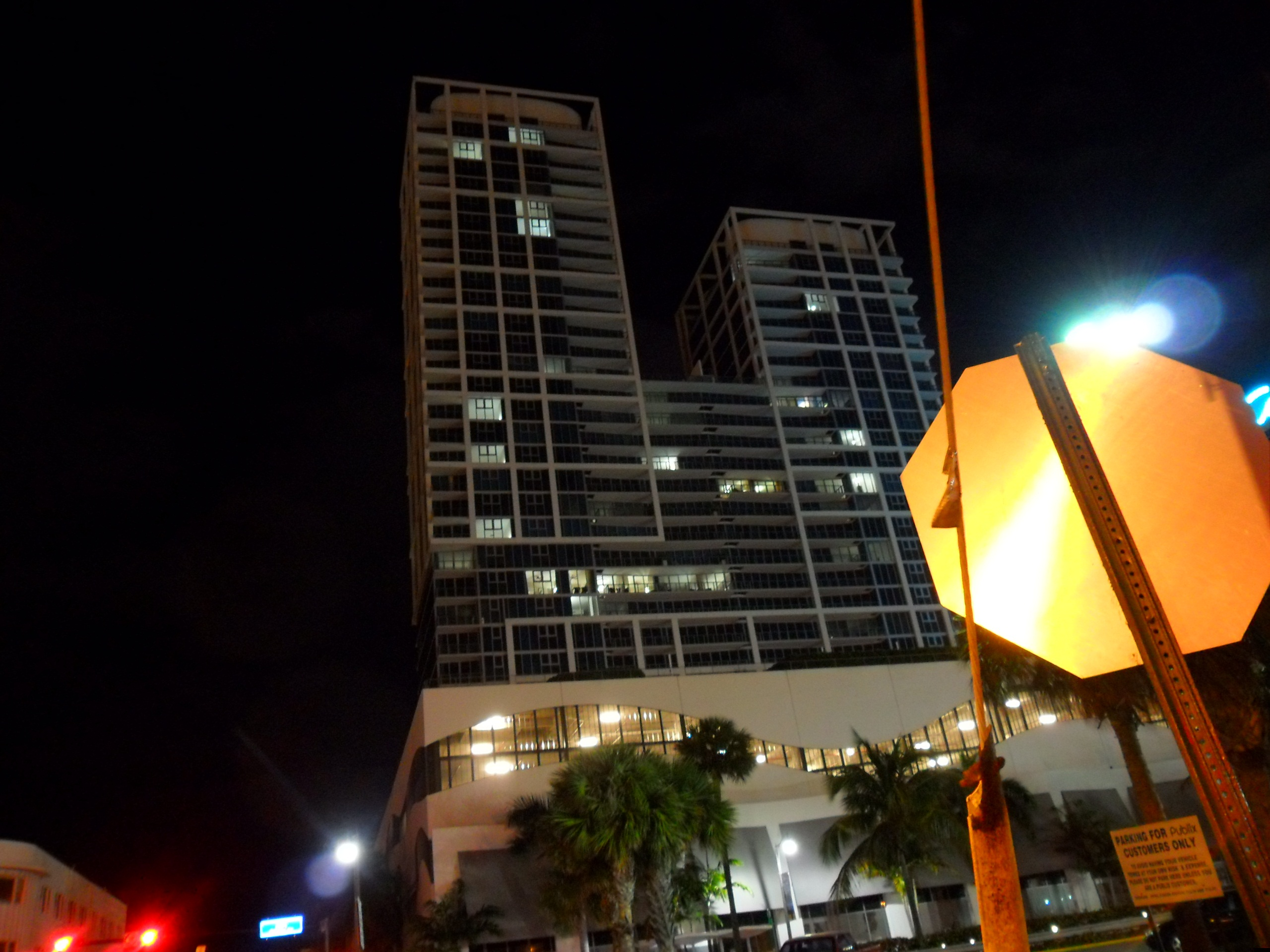
The Carillon Hotel & Spa North Tower at night viewed from the west on 69th Street

== See also ==
- List of tallest buildings in Miami Beach
