= Pura Vida Miami =

American restaurant chain

- Industry: Food and beverage; Café
- Founded: United States (2012; 14 years ago)
- Founder: Omer and Jennifer Horev
- Headquarters: Miami Beach, Florida, United States
- Number of locations: 40+ (2025)
- Key people: Omer Horev (Co-Founder & CEO); Jennifer Horev (Co-Founder & CBO)
- Products: Health-focused all-day café menu
- Website: https://www.puravidamiami.com

Pura Vida Miami is an American fast-casual café and restaurant chain founded in 2012 in Miami Beach, Florida. Since opening its first location in South Beach, the chain has grown to over 40 locations in Florida, New York, New Jersey, Maryland, Virginia, and California.

The chain offers an all-day café menu, in addition to smoothies, açai bowls, and more.

== History ==
Pura Vida Miami was founded in 2012 by Omer and Jennifer Horev, who opened the first café in the South of Fifth neighborhood of Miami Beach.

By 2020, Pura Vida had expanded to multiple Miami and South Florida locations, including a major outpost on West Avenue in Miami Beach. The company opened its first New York City location in July 2024 in the NoMad neighborhood.

In 2025, Pura Vida opened several locations in California.

The company raised growth investment from TSG Consumer Partners in November 2025.

== Locations ==
| Country | Number of locations |
|---|---|
| Florida | 37 |
| New York | 5 |
| California | 3 |
| Total in the United States | 45 |
