= The Setai Miami Beach =

The Setai Tower
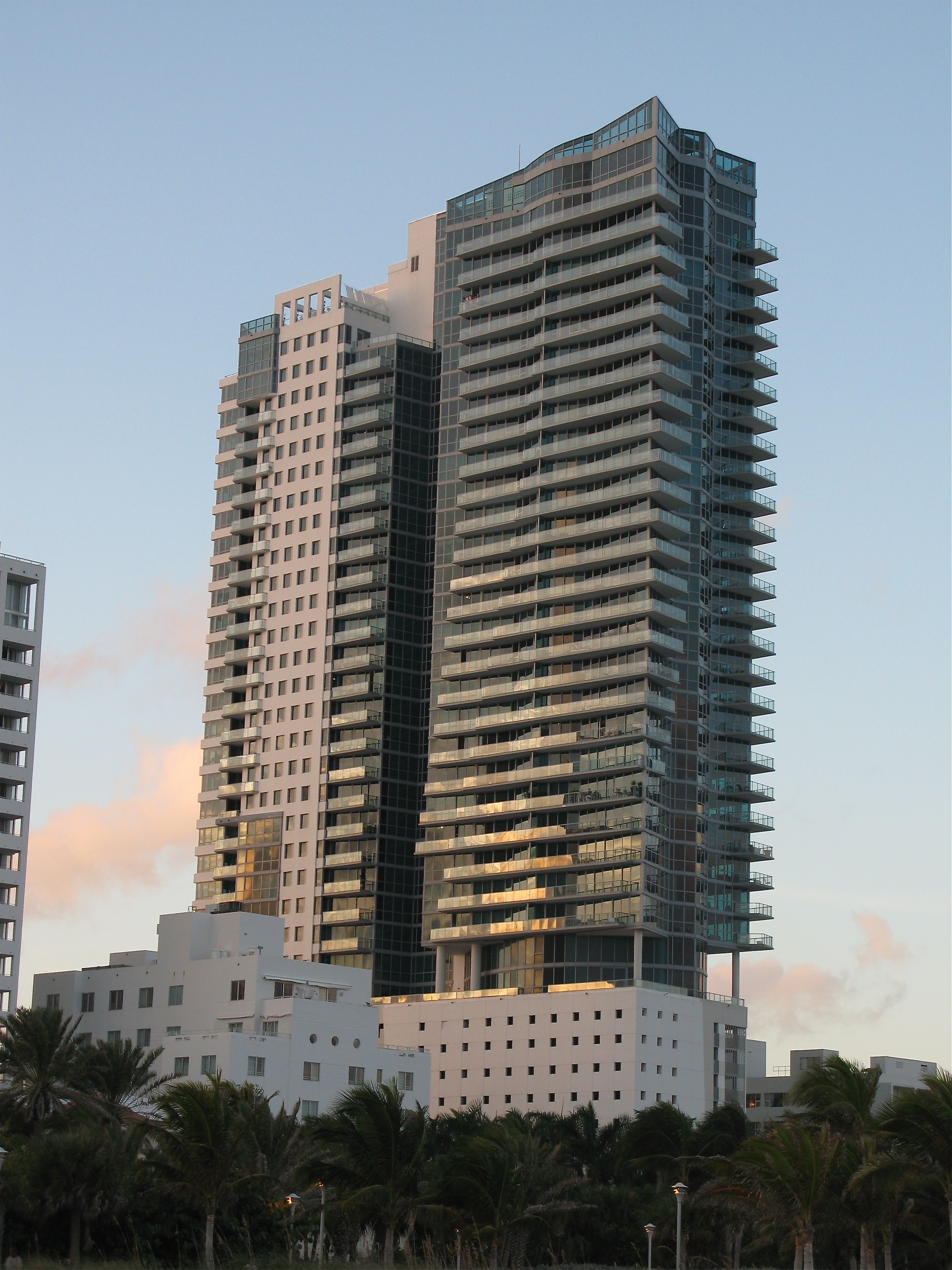
- The south side of The Setai viewed from the beach

General information
- Status: Completed
- Type: Residential condominium/hotel
- Location: 2001 Collins Ave. Miami Beach, FL
- Coordinates: 25.795988°N 80.128782°W
- Topped-out: December 2002
- Opening: 2004
- Owner: Joe Nakash (co-owner) André Alves da Cruz Ferrari

Height
- Roof: 117.5 m (385 ft)

Technical details
- Floor count: 38

The Setai Hotel and Residences, also known as The Setai Miami Beach and The Setai South Beach, is a high rise luxury hotel and condominium located in South Beach in Miami Beach, Florida. The building has 38 floors and is 117.5 meters tall, making it one of the tallest buildings in Miami Beach. The hotel, designed by Jean-Michel Gathy, includes a recording studio and a 10,000-square-foot (930 m^{2}) penthouse that includes a rooftop pool and jacuzzi.

The Setai Miami Beach is a member of The Leading Hotels of the World.

== Gallery ==
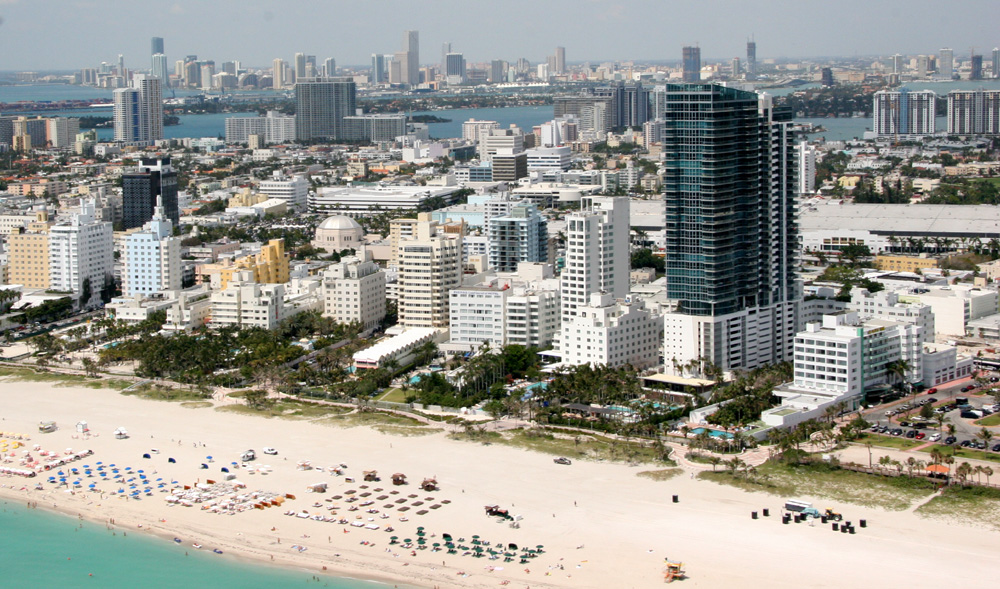
The Setai viewed from the air looking southwest towards Miami

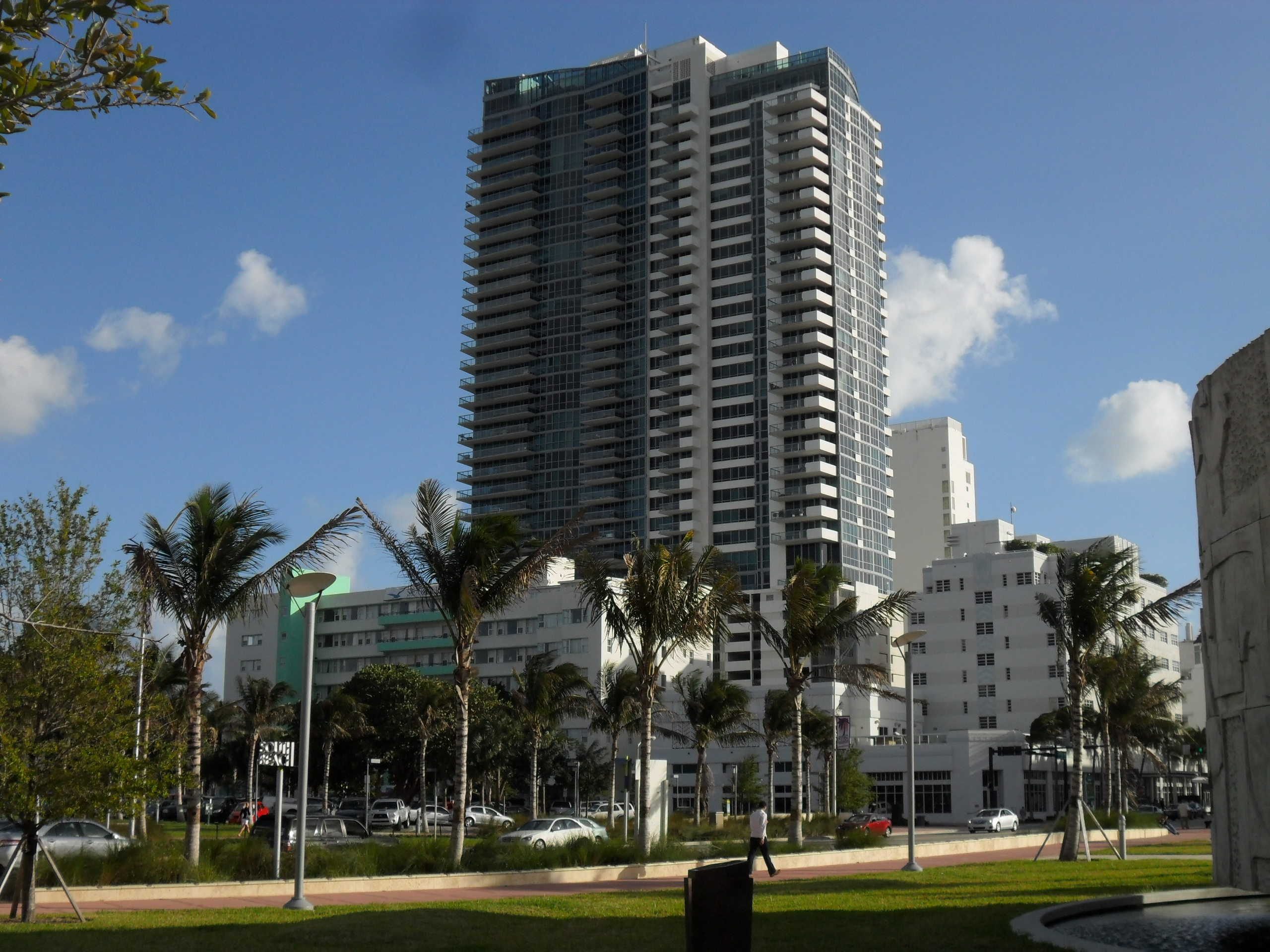
The north side of the Setai viewed from 22nd Street
