= Portofino Tower =

1997 residential skyscraper in Miami Beach, Florida

Coordinates: 25.767664°N 80.135051°W

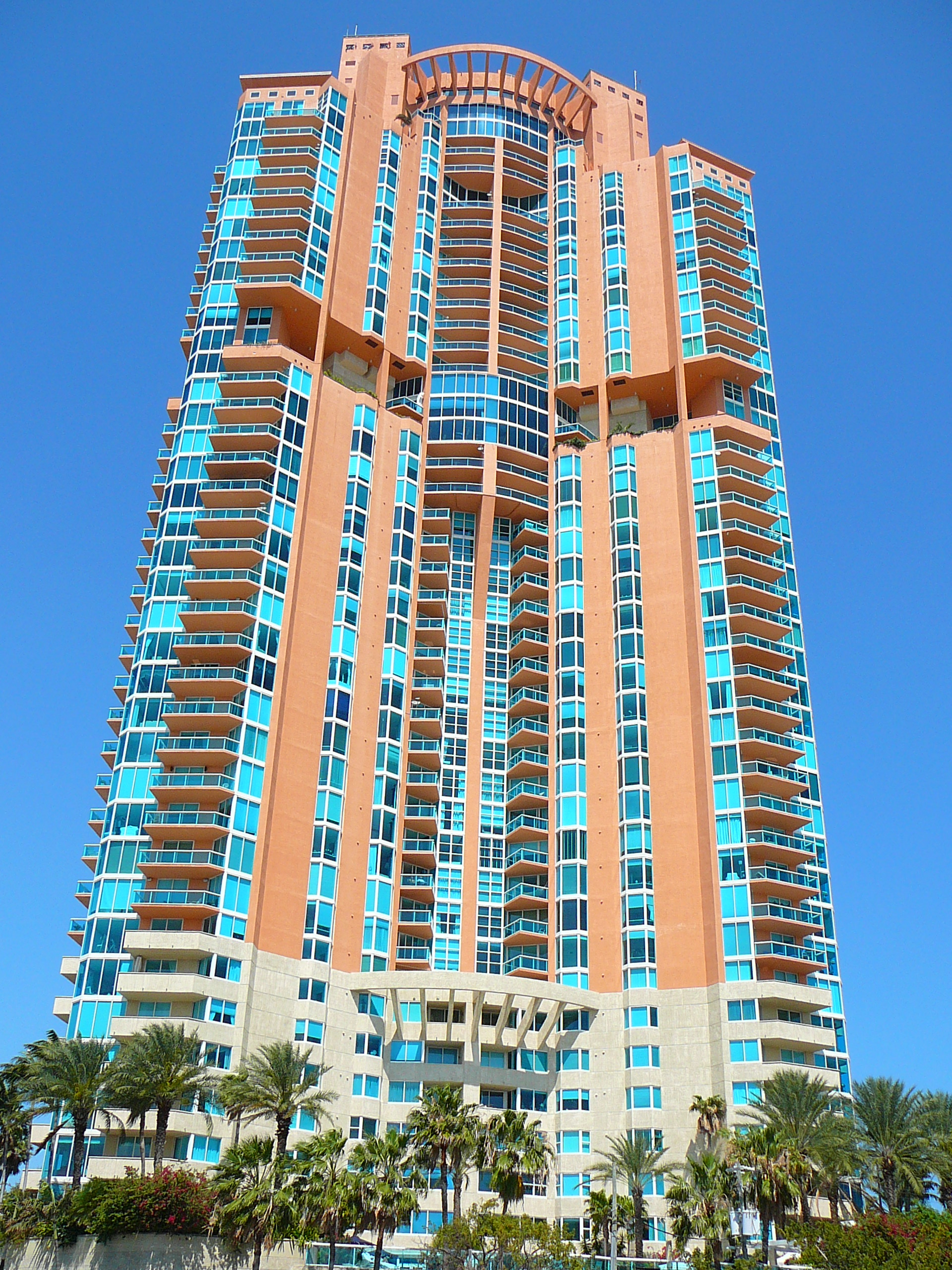
Portofino Tower in Miami Beach. Photo: Marc Averette

Portofino Tower is a residential skyscraper in Miami Beach, Florida. South Beach. It is located on the southern extremity of the city overlooking Government Cut. Portofino, which opened in 1997, is 484 ft (148 m) tall and contains 44 floors. It is located in the "SOFI" (South of Fifth Street) neighborhood. The tower is named after the Italian town of Portofino.

It is the fourth tallest skyscraper in Miami Beach.

Developed by Thomas Kramer's Portofino Group in partnership with The Related Group, Portofino Tower was South of Fifth's second luxury skyscraper condominium.

Portofino Tower contains eight different floor plans ranging from 1,000 sq ft (93 m^{2}) to more than 6,000 sq ft (560 m^{2}). Amenities include a swimming pool, tennis courts, fitness center, full-time concierge service, recreation room, and four-story lobby.

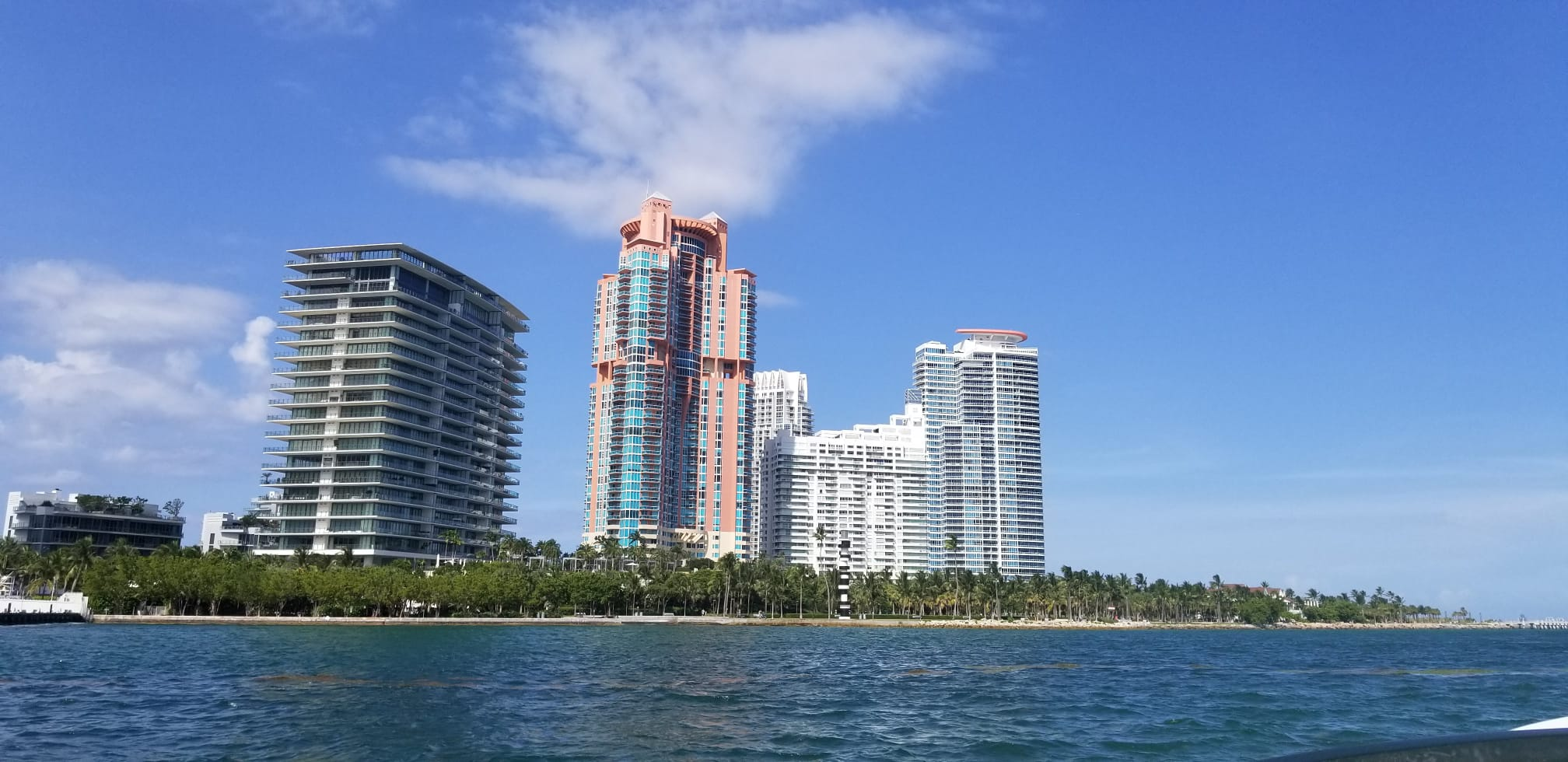
Portofino Tower seen from the Government Cut

Because of Portofino Tower's high profile and high-security accommodations, the building has become the home of multiple national and international celebrities. Famous current and former residents include: Donald Sutherland, Sir Ivan, Ingrid Casares, Anna Kournikova and Isabella S.

== See also ==
- List of tallest buildings in Miami Beach

Preceded by La Gorce Palace	Tallest Building in Miami Beach; 1997—2000; 148m	Succeeded by Blue and Green Diamond
