= Omer Horev =

Israeli businessman (born 1985)

- Born: April 1985 (age 41); Netanya, Tel Aviv
- Occupations: Entrepreneur; restaurateur
- Known for: Founder of the Pura Vida Miami restaurant chain
- Spouse: Jennifer Horev (m. 2018)

Omer Horev (born April 1985) is an Israeli businessman and former real estate associate. He is best known as founder and chief executive officer of Pura Vida Miami. He also founded Abba Telavivian Kitchen, a mediterranean restaurant in Florida.

== Early life ==
Horev was born in Netanya, Tel Aviv, Israel and moved to the United States when he was 21. His parents are Moroccan.

== Career ==
Horev was a real estate associate. In 2012, he began Pura Vida as a side project in South Florida. He met his wife Jennifer, a real state agent at the time, in 2014. She joined Pura Vida in 2014. The first location opened on Washington Avenue.

In 2021, he opened Abba Telavivian Kitchen with chef Sam Gorenstein in South Beach.

== Personal life ==
Horev married Jennifer in 2018.
