= Akoya Condominium =

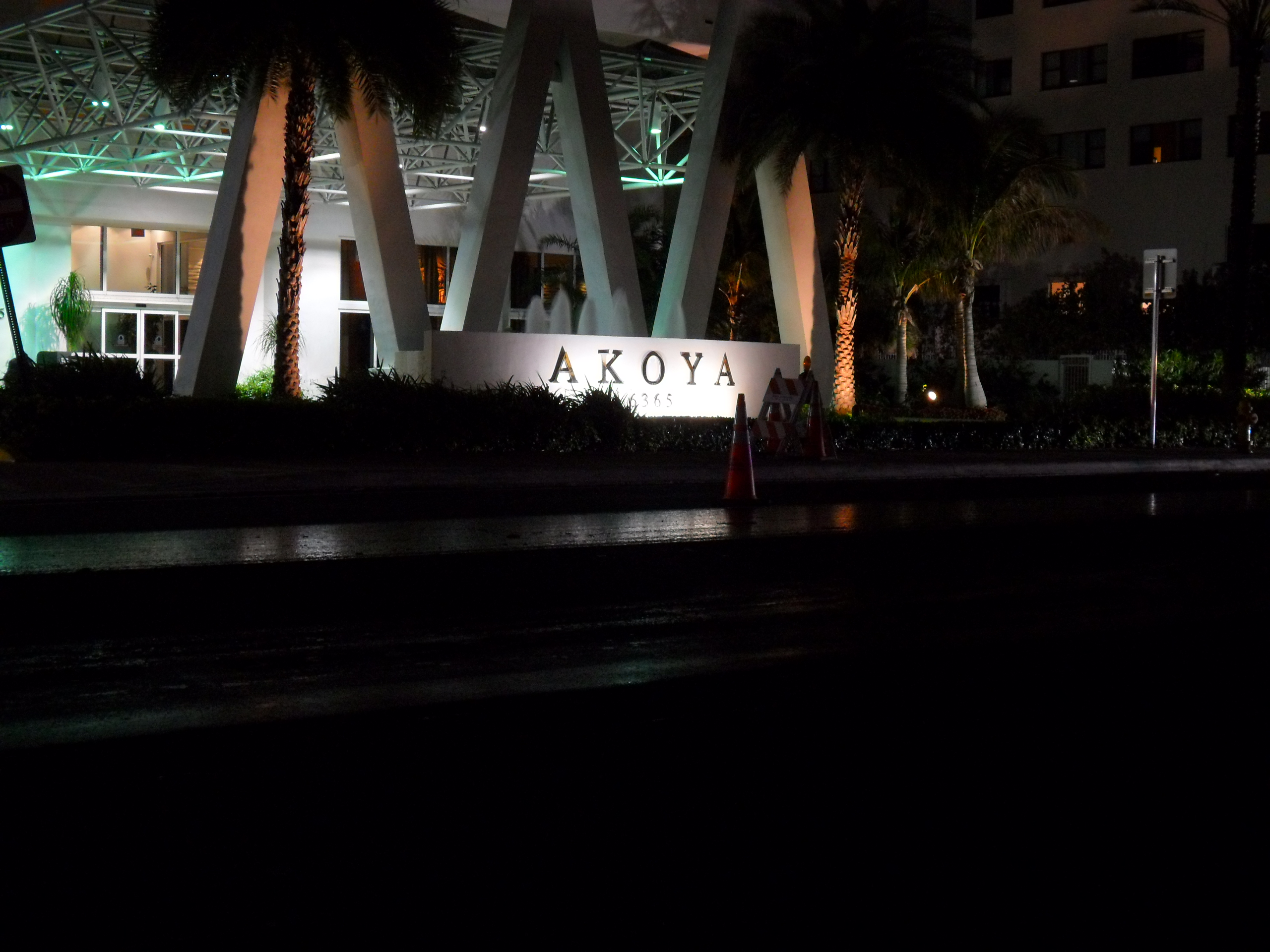
- Entrance of Akoya Condominium on Collins Avenue

- Location within Florida

General information
- Type: High-rise residential condominium
- Location: Miami Beach, Florida, United States
- Coordinates: 25.845826°N 80.119781°W
- Opened: 2004

Height
- Height: 150 m (490 ft)

Technical details
- Floor count: 47

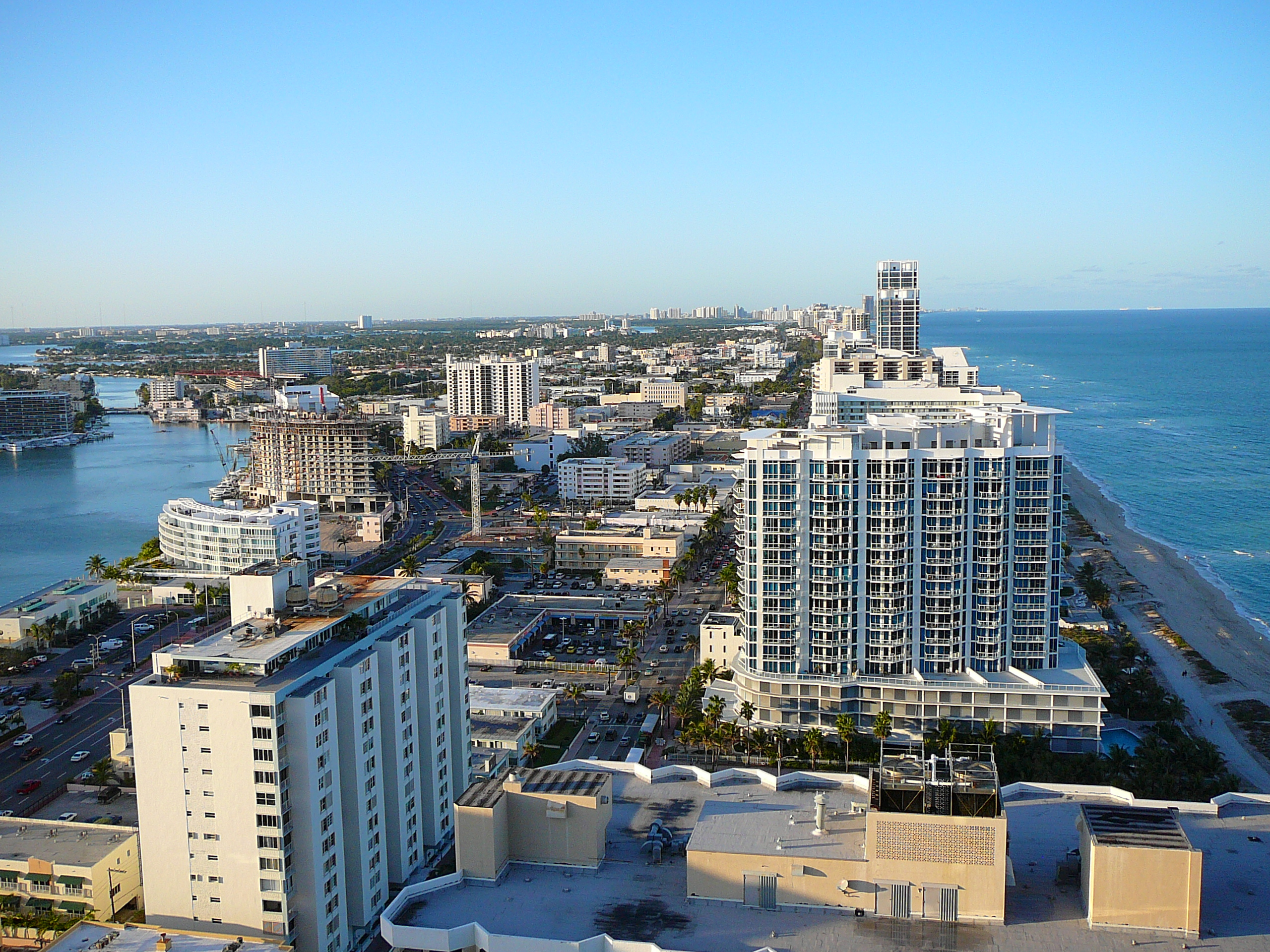
The northern part of the city of Miami Beach, Florida, known as North Beach, as seen from Akoya Condominium 2/14/2008.

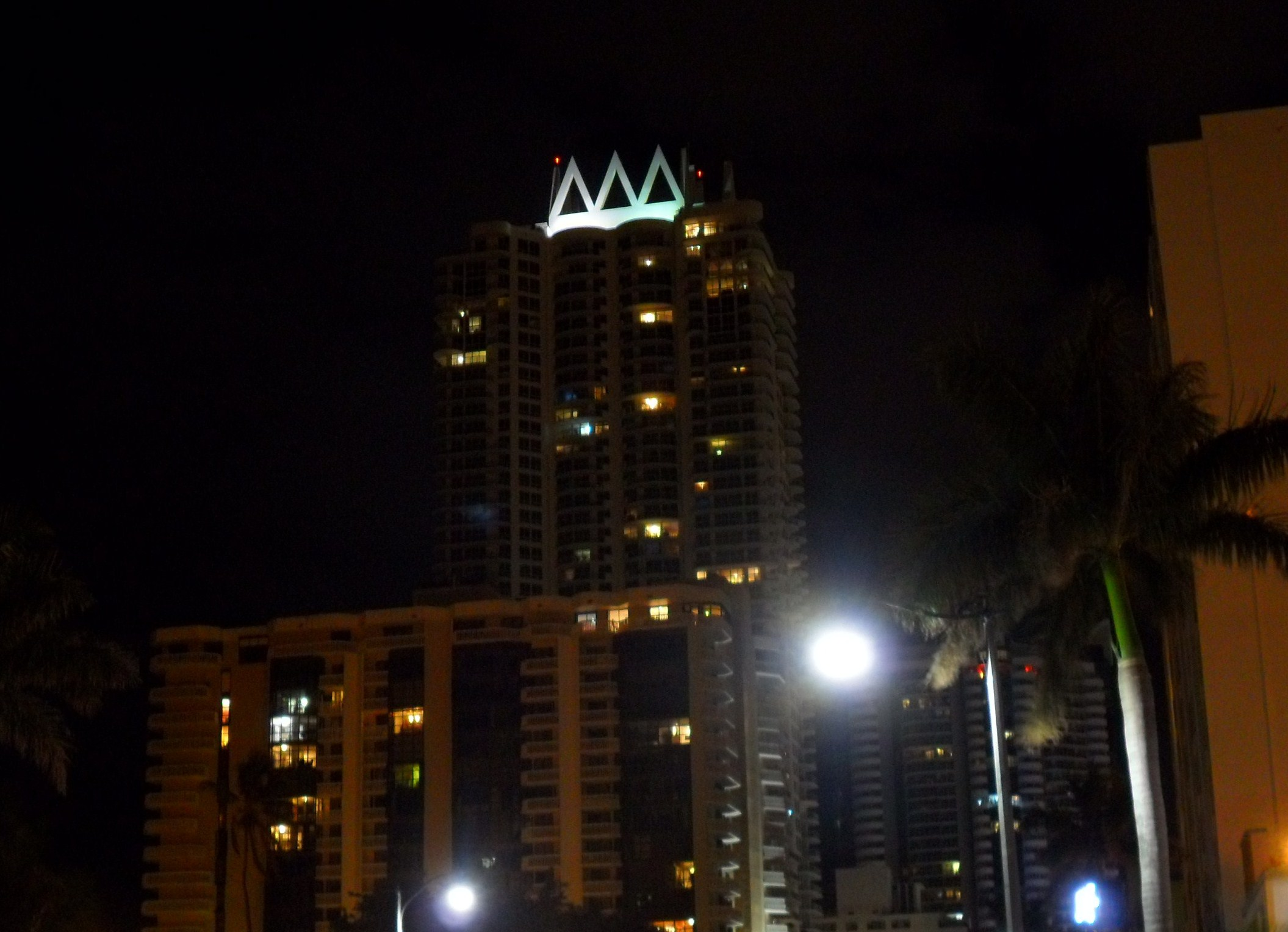
Akoya Condominium at night from Collins Avenue southbound

Akoya Condominium is a 47-story, high-rise residential condominium located in Miami Beach, Florida. Built in 2004 and rising 150 meters (492 feet), Akoya Condominium is the third tallest building in Miami Beach, after the 170-meter (559 ft) Blue and Green Diamonds and the 167-meter (548 ft) Five Park tower. It was built as one of the last very tall buildings permitted in Miami Beach before a 1998 height ordinance, capping buildings at 200 feet, went into effect. In the 2020s some of these restrictions were lifted as the 545-foot (166 m), 48-story Five Park was built in South Beach.

The Akoya Condominium was originally planned to be the White Diamond. Akoya has more floors than the Blue and Green Diamond buildings but does not have the diamond-shaped roof that they have. The original developer of the projects, Brazilian businessman Múcio Athayde, was forced to sell the White Diamond project in 2001 due to financial stresses that later put the other two buildings into bankruptcy. The project was completed by the MerCo Group, controlled by developer Homero Meruelo, which later also bought the nearby Deauville Hotel. The name "Akoya" is originally Japanese (阿古屋) and refers to the Akoya pearl oyster, which was chosen to replace the diamond theme.

Akoya Condominium is located along the beach of the Atlantic Ocean on Collins Avenue. Akoya Condominium has 528 units, with 11 units per floor which translates to 48 floors. A modern fitness center, a tennis court, a swimming pool and racquetball facilities are available exclusively for Akoya's residents.

== See also ==
- List of tallest buildings in Miami Beach
