= Continuum on South Beach =

Continuum complex in Miami Beach, FL 33139 United States

Coordinates: 25.766876°N 80.132861°W

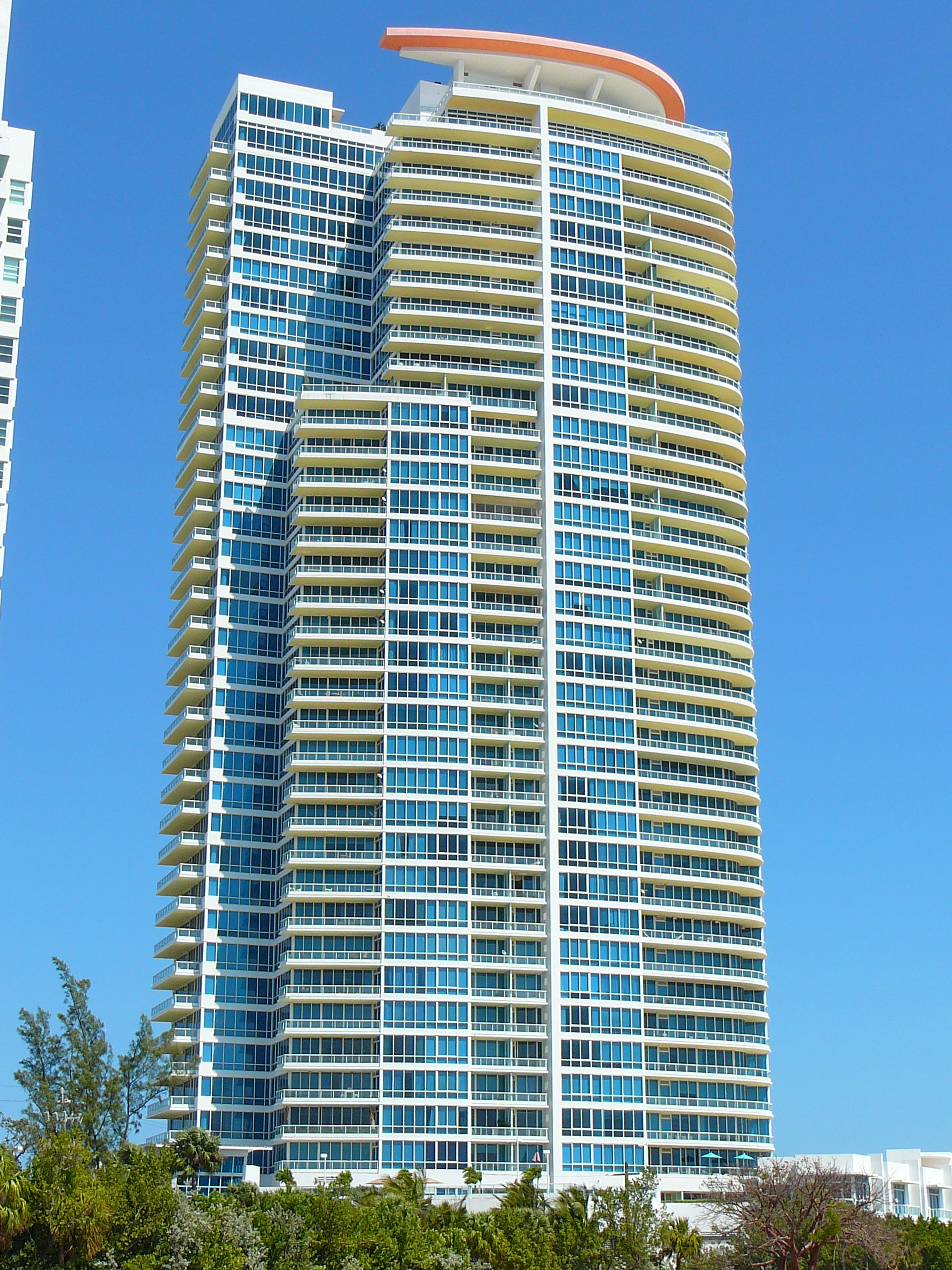
The Continuum on South Beach south tower in Miami Beach.

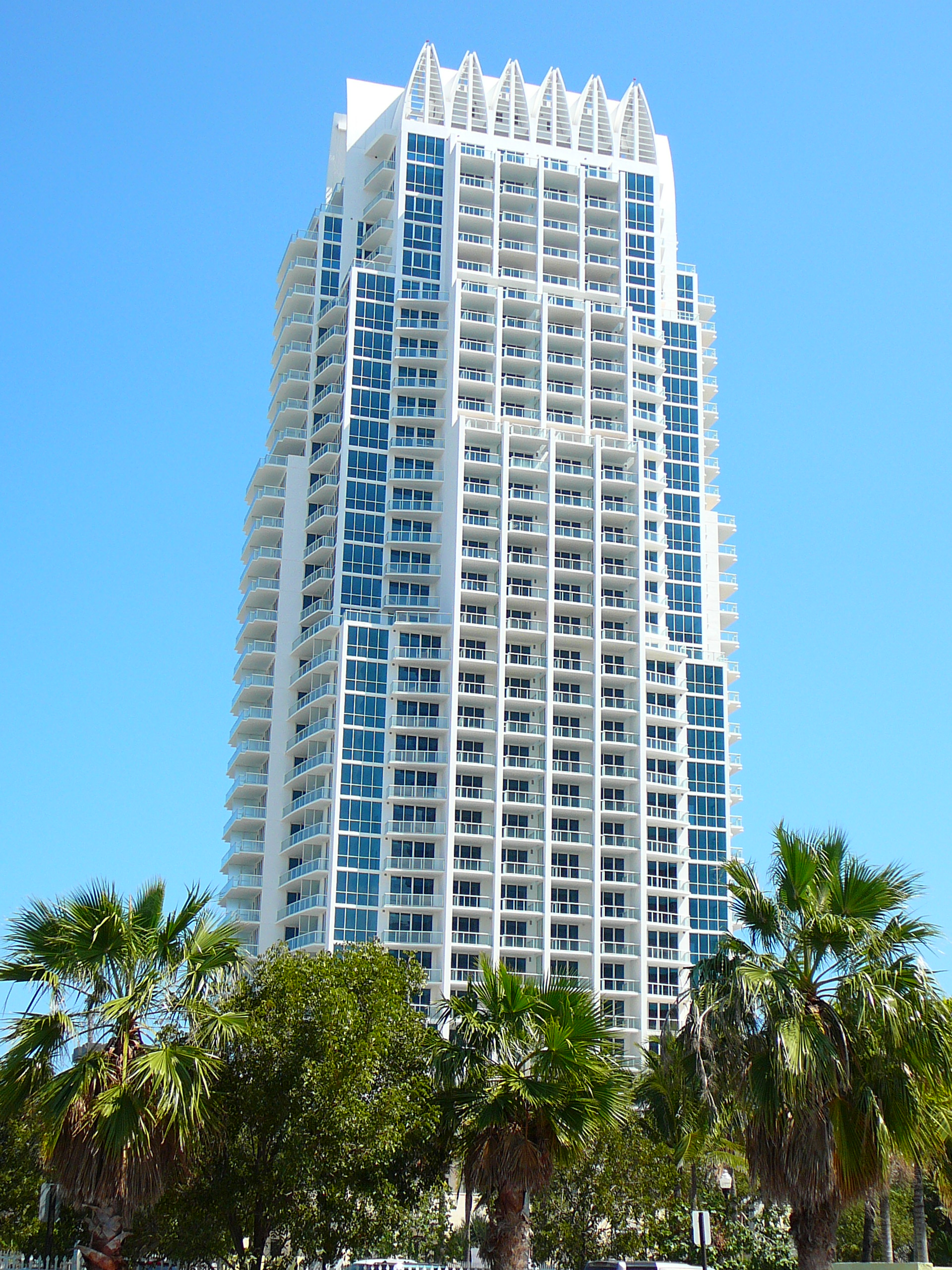
The Continuum on South Beach north tower in Miami Beach.

The Continuum on South Beach are residential skyscrapers in Miami Beach, Florida's South Beach, located in the "SoFI" (South of Fifth Street) neighborhood (the southern extremity of the city), overlooking Government Cut. The south tower, which opened in 2002, is 471 ft (143 m) tall and has 40 floors. The north tower, which opened in 2008, has 37 floors. Both towers were developed by Ian Bruce Eichner's The Continuum Company, LLC.

The Continuum is an oceanfront property with 26 different condo floor-plans and 5 different townhouse floor-plans. Amenities at the Continuum includes a lagoon pool, sporting club, multiple meeting rooms, 3 tennis courts, 24-hour security, heated whirlpools and cold plunge, private tennis club, spa services, and Redwood sauna among others. The Continuum provides direct access to the beach.

Situated on a 12 acres oceanfront property, the Continuum has unobstructed views of the Atlantic Ocean to the east, Fisher Island to the South, city of Miami Beach to the North and partial view of the downtown Miami skyline to the west.

The Continuum I South Beach features 318 condo units with the typical floor plan ranging from 1,201 to 4,973 sq.ft. and the Continuum II South Beach features 203 condo units with the typical floor plan ranging from 1,491 to 3,030 sq.ft.

== History ==
According to the Sun-Sentinel, Continuum opened for business in 2000, with the 42-floor south tower. In 2008, a 37-floor north tower was added. In 2019, the owners decided to drop "South Beach" from the name.

In 2019, the North Tower grand lobby hosted a month-long exhibition of original NASA images celebrating 50 years since the Moon landing.

== Notable residents ==
- Donna Adelson
- Chris Cornell
- Stan Wertlieb

== See also ==
- List of tallest buildings in Miami Beach
