= Blue and Green Diamond =

Twin towers in Miami Beach, Florida, United States

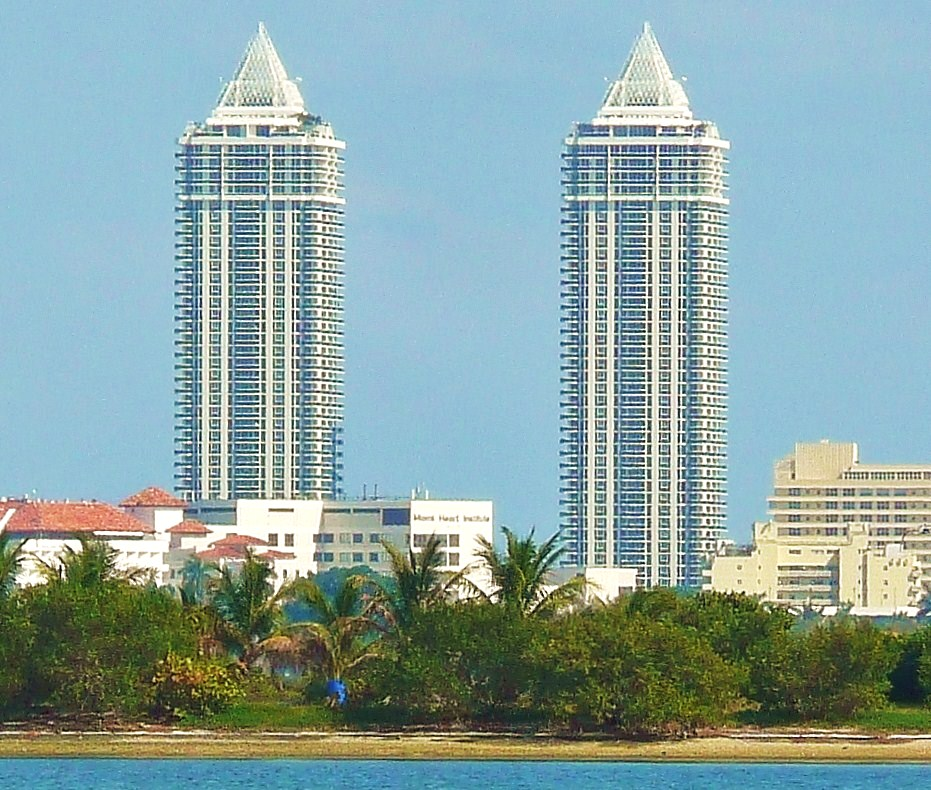
- The Blue and Green Diamond condominiums as seen from Morningside Park
- Interactive map of the Blue and Green Diamond area

General information
- Location: Miami Beach, Miami, United States
- Coordinates: 25.822834°N 80.121411°W
- Completed: 2000

Height
- Roof: 559 feet (170 m)

Technical details
- Floor count: 44

Design and construction
- Architect: Robert M. Swedroe Architects & Planners

The Blue and Green Diamond are twin towers in Miami Beach, Florida, United States. They are both 559 feet (170 m) and 44 floors. They are the tallest buildings in Miami Beach, and were both completed in 2000. The towers, mirror image of each other, share a full service, stand-alone clubhouse building designed to look like the early mansions of the rich and famous that once dotted the 1920s Miami Beach shoreline. The complex contains a multi-level parking garage with tennis courts atop. There is a large pool deck overlooking the beach and surrounded by private cabana units. The towers are typically 8 residential units per floor. The Tower Suites near the top are marked by the prominent wrap-around terraces. The top full floor features seven penthouse units, six of which are two-story with private roof terraces and plunge pools. The Blue Diamond (north tower) and Green Diamond (south tower) were known for being the tallest oceanfront residential towers in the United States until Jade Beach and Jade Ocean were built in Sunny Isles Beach, Florida, in 2008 and 2009.

The towers are on Collins Avenue, north of the Eden Roc Hotel.

== Gallery ==
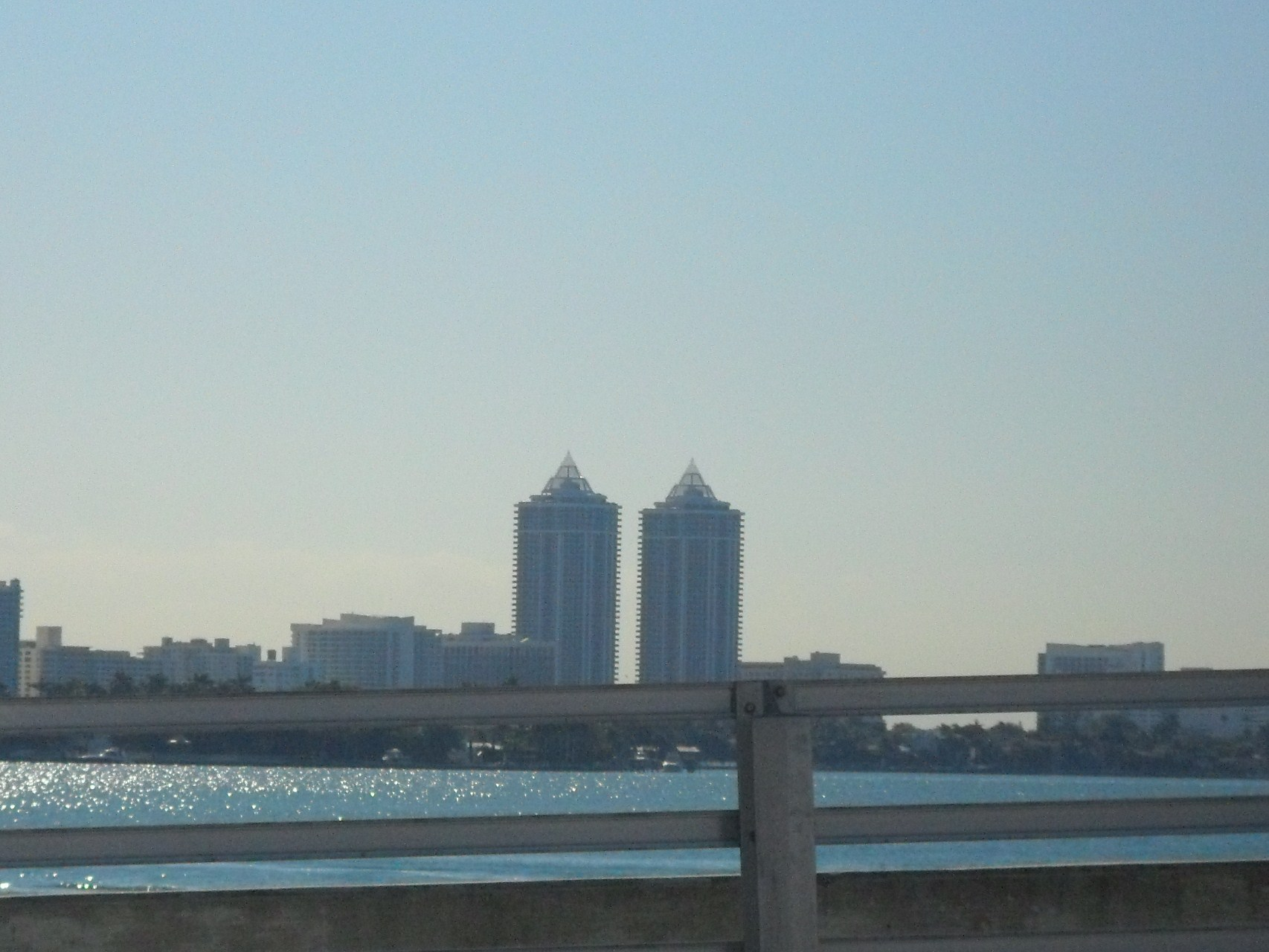
Blue and Green Diamond from the John F Kennedy Causeway (northwest)

Preceded by Portofino Tower	Tallest Building in Miami Beach; 2000—2024; 153m	Succeeded by Five Park

== See also ==
- Akoya Condominiums
- List of tallest buildings in Miami Beach
