= The Tides (Miami Beach) =

Building in Miami Beach, Florida, United States

Coordinates: 25.783121°N 80.130351°W

The Tides is an art deco building in Miami Beach. With 49 meters and 11 stories of height, at the time of construction in 1936 was the tallest edifice in the city and one of the tallest in the state of Florida. The building was renovated in 1997, and is currently a residential condominium. and luxury hotel.

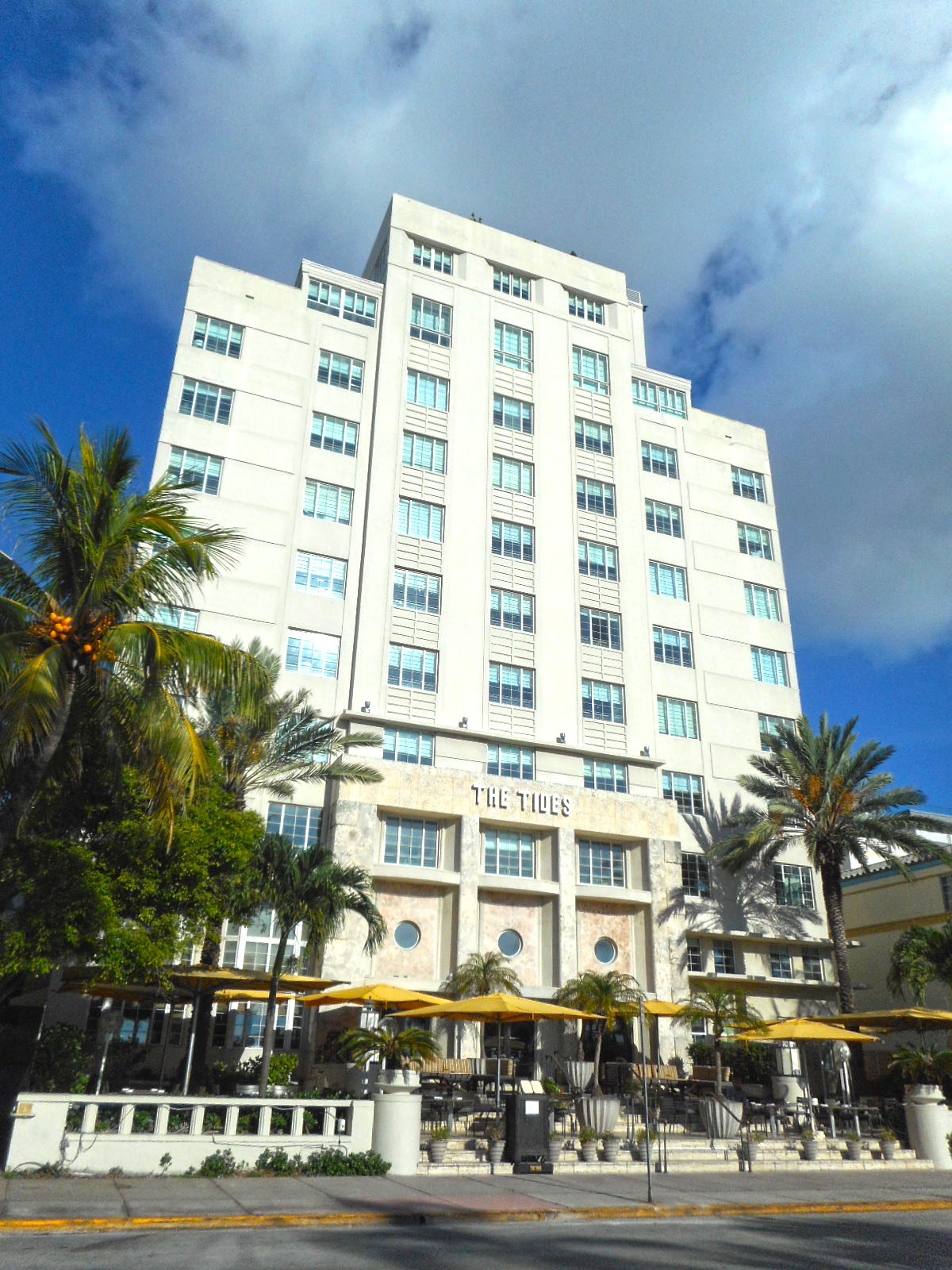
The Tides building in South Beach, Miami

It was previously operated by the Chris Blackwell resort group Island Outpost. Since being operated by Island Outpost, it had multiple owners and is currently known as the King & Grove Tides South Beach .

Preceded by The Blackstone	Tallest Building in Miami Beach; 1936—1938; 49m	Succeeded by Shore Club
