= Murano at Portofino =

Skyscraper in Miami Beach, Florida

Coordinates: 25.768533°N 80.137759°W

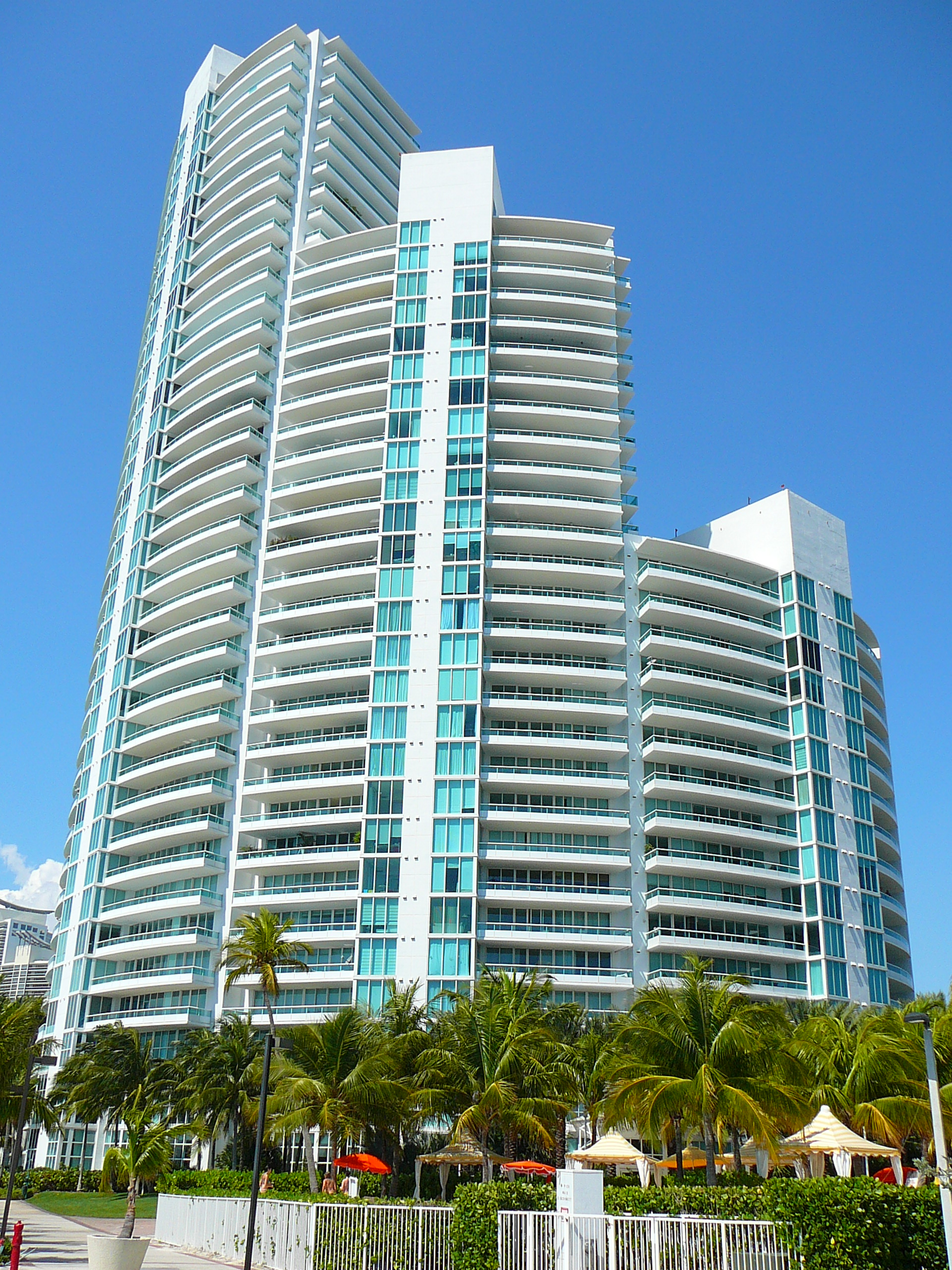
The Murano at Portofino residential tower in Miami Beach. Photo: Marc Averette

Murano at Portofino is a highly affluent residential enclave tower /skyscraper in Miami Beach, Florida's South Beach. It is located directly on Biscayne Bay on the Miami Beach Marina. The tower, which opened in 2001, is 402 ft (123 m) tall and contains 37 floors. It is located in the "SOFI" (South of Fifth Street) neighborhood.

The building has 3 tiers on a 4.5-acre (18,000 m^{2}) site, and has over 600 linear ft along Biscayne Bay.

It is the eighth tallest skyscraper in Miami Beach.

Developed by Thomas Kramer's Portofino Group in partnership with the Related Group of Florida, Murano at Portofino includes eight different style floor plans ranging from 1,000 sq ft (93 m^{2}). to 3,400 sq ft (320 m^{2}).

Murano at Portofino faces west and has views of the Biscayne Bay, Government Cut, and partial view of the Atlantic Ocean. It is considered to be one of the most luxurious condominiums in Miami Beach. Murano at Portofino amenities include bay-front pool and spa, tennis courts, fitness center, freshwater pools, private beach club, media and multi-purpose rooms, 24-hour security, and valet service.

== See also ==
- List of tallest buildings in Miami Beach
