= The Blackstone =

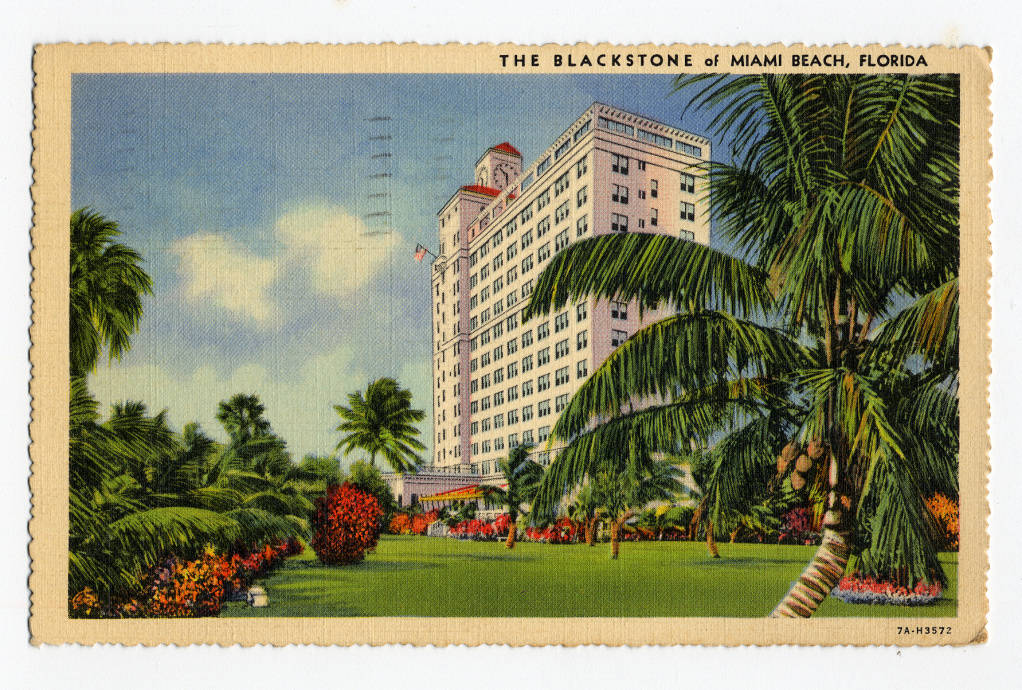
- Interactive map of the The Blackstone area

General information
- Status: Topped-out
- Type: Residential
- Location: Miami Beach, Florida, United States
- Coordinates: 25.778496°N 80.133471°W

Technical details
- Floor count: 13

Design and construction
- Architects: D. Kingstone Hall, Santos/Raimundez Architects

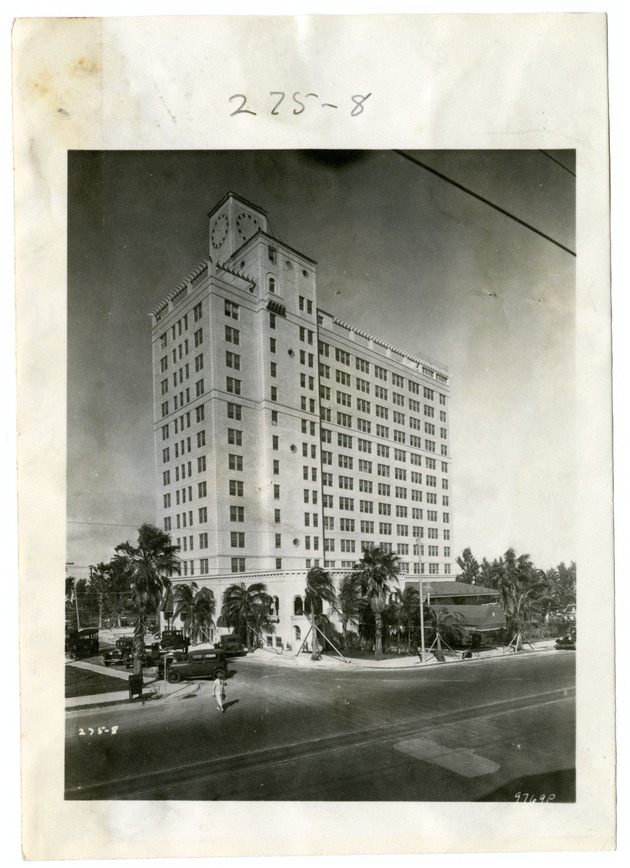
Blackstone Hotel in 1930. From HistoryMiami's Claude Matlack Photograph Collection.

The Blackstone is a residential building located at 800 Washington Avenue, Miami Beach, Florida, United States.

It was designed as the Blackstone Hotel by architect B. Kingston Hall in 1929. Built and designed in the Mediterranean Revival style, the hotel was 13 stories high, had a mission tile roof supported by exposed rafters, and was topped by a clock that concealed the hotel’s elevator machinery. Nathan Stone, a Jewish entrepreneur, was the developer but he died shortly before the hotel opened in 1929. Nathan's son Alfred Stone (father of future senator U.S. Senator Richard Stone) completed the construction and ran the hotel. At the time it was built, it was considered to be the tallest building in the city, and so remained for seven years.

The Blackstone Hotel is reputed to be the first Miami Beach hotel to solicit Jewish clients, and also the first to give accommodations to African-Americans. In 1954, the African Methodist Church organized a convention to take place in Miami Beach and tasked local Black minister Edward Graham to find a hotel for the event. The Blackstone Hotel was the only large hotel that agreed to host the convention, however, when the news became public, the Stone family faced threats of harm from extremist groups and a boycott from the community. Despite the threats, Alfred Stone upheld his commitment.

George Gershwin reportedly wrote portions of Porgy and Bess while reposing in the Blackstone Hotel's rooftop solarium.

In the 1950s Michael Sossin purchased and developed the Blackstone into a retirement home. In the late 1980s it was renovated by George Perez into affordable housing, and was one of the first low income tax credit rehab projects in Miami Beach.

The hotel was renovated again in 1987. Debt on the building is still being paid back.

Preceded by Unknown	Tallest Building in Miami Beach; 1929—1936; 48m	Succeeded by The Tides
