= Paraíso Bay =

- Interactive map of the Paraíso Bay area

General information
- Status: Completed
- Type: Residential
- Location: Miami, Florida, United States
- Coordinates: 25.8062°N 80.1862°W
- Construction started: 2014
- Completed: 2018
- Opening: 2018
- Owner: Resident-owned

Height
- Roof: 550 ft (170 m)

Design and construction
- Architect: Arquitectonica
- Developer: The Related Group

Paraíso Bay is a group of four adjacent high-rise buildings in the Edgewater neighborhood of Miami, Florida, United States. Two of the towers, Paraiso Bay and Grand Paraiso, are nearly identical, rising about 550 feet (168 m) with 54 floors, and adjoined by a common amenities, parking and recreation structure. The two additional towers are branded ONE Paraíso (53 floors, height of 601 feet) and Paraíso Bayviews (46 floors, height of 500 feet) and are standalone buildings. Collectively, the buildings contain over 1300 residential units.

A separate two-story structure is located on the water and currently houses a restaurant operated by James Beard Award-winning chef, Michael Schwartz. The restaurant, called Amara at Paraiso, is open to the public. The development also incorporates a bay-front park, called Paraiso Park, that includes a children's playground and fenced-in dog park. Collectively, the residential buildings, restaurant structure and park are referred to as The Paraiso District.

The development is located directly on the Biscayne Bay and all residential units enjoy direct views of the water.

Construction of the project started in July 2014 and was completed in 2018. Several city officials joined in the groundbreaking ceremony, including mayor Tomás Regalado. The developer, The Related Group, pledged to include a public park as part of the project due to a land swap deal that allowed them to close the end of a city street. The project was formerly approved as Element by a separate developer.

Paraíso is Spanish for paradise.

== Amenities ==
The development was originally marketed as having among the largest variety of resident amenities of any luxury complex throughout the world. Residents in Paraiso Bay and Grand Paraiso share a large variety of amenities, while ONE Paraiso and Paraiso Bayviews have amenities that are dedicated to each specific building.

Amenities include:

- Numerous swimming pools, including children's pools
- A large, circular "zero entry" pool (Paraiso Bay and Grand Paraiso)
- 3+ Acres of resort decks and lounging areas
- Outdoor hot tubs
- Resident clubrooms with catering kitchens
- Billiards tables and rooms
- Business centers with private boardroom
- Cardio and weight gyms
- Spin bike studios
- Cinema room
- Cigar room with private cigar storage
- Wine tasting room with private wine storage
- Indoor hot tubs, dry saunas and steam saunas
- Massage treatment rooms
- Lighted tennis courts
- BBQ grills and outdoor party pavilions
- Business centers and board rooms
- Game room
- Children's play room
- Golf simulator room (Paraiso Bay and Grand Paraiso)
- Bowling lanes (Paraiso Bay and Grand Paraiso)
- Putting green
- Storage for bicycles, scooters and personal water equipment (e.g. stand-up paddle-boards)
- Valet parking
- Private boat dock
- Bayview park with children's playground and dog park

== See also ==
- List of tallest buildings in Miami
