= South of Fifth =

Human settlement in Miami Beach, Florida, United States of America

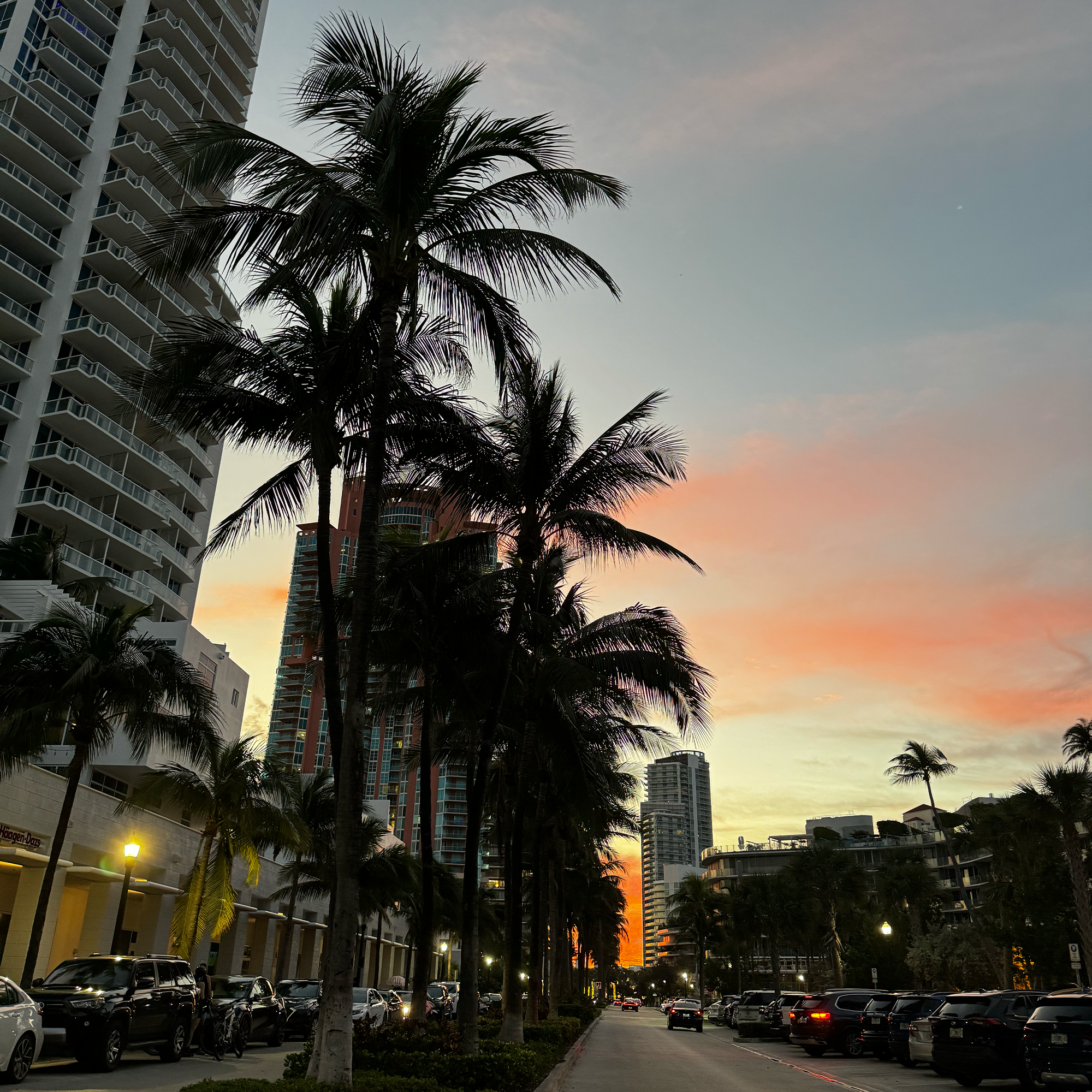
- Picture of the sunset along South Pointe Drive in the South of Fifth Neighborhood of Miami Beach, FL.
- Nickname: SoFi

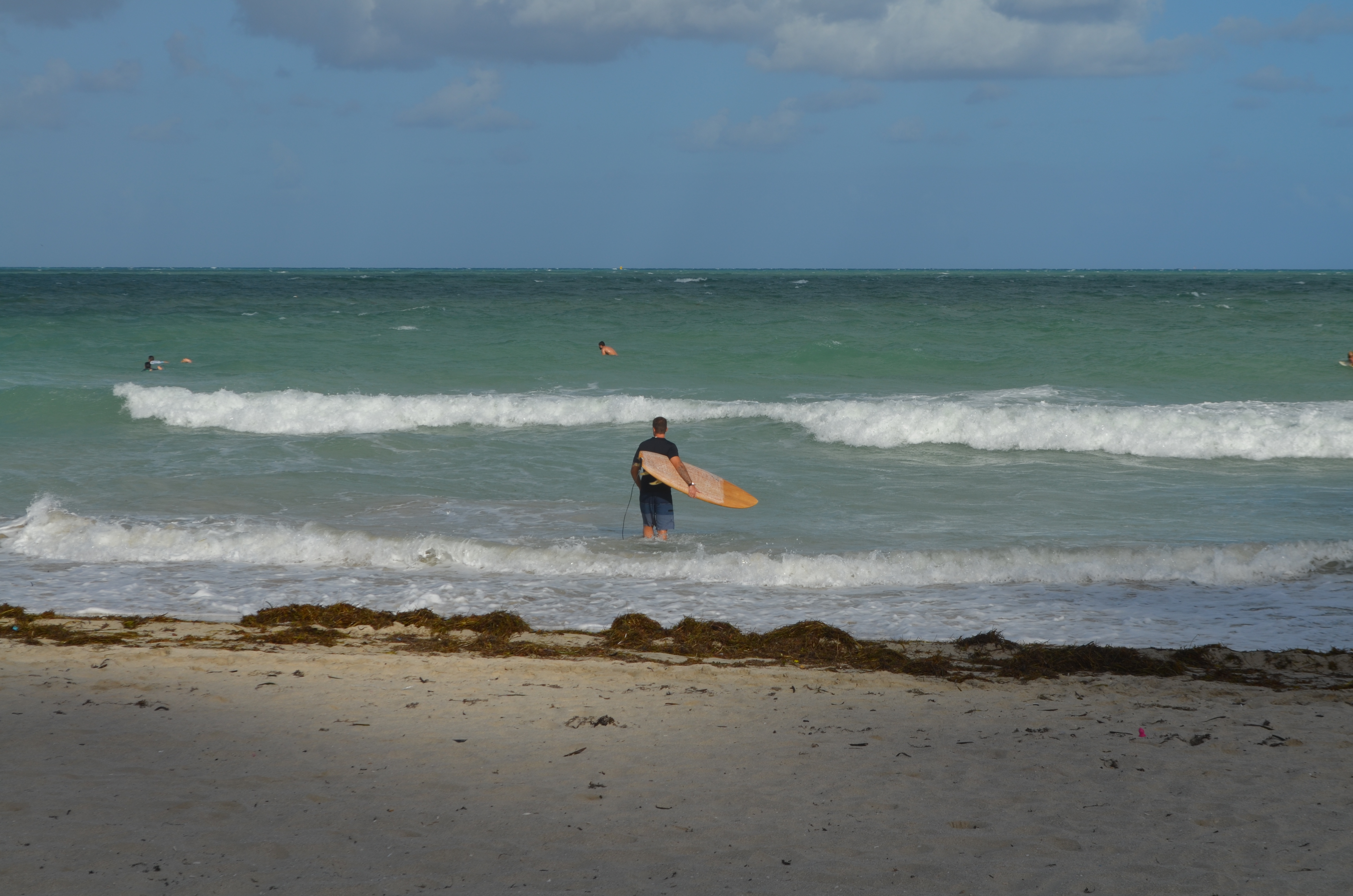
Surfing attempts near a high tide.

South of Fifth, also known as SoFi (so-FEE), is a small exclusive affluent neighborhood in South Beach (Miami Beach) that goes from South Pointe Park north to fifth street; from east to west. The area is surrounded by water on three sides from the Ocean to Biscayne Bay. South of Fifth is considered a peaceful oasis with immediate access to many of South Beach's notable activities. Its ZIP code is 33139.

Prior to the end of World War II, the South of Fifth neighborhood was known as one of the few enclaves that catered to Jewish residents and visitors, who were widely discriminated against during the period. Developers and hoteliers, including prominent figures like Carl G. Fisher and Henry Flagler, imposed restrictive covenants that explicitly barred Jews from purchasing property or staying in hotels north of Fifth Street.

The neighborhood remains home to Congregation Beth Jacob, Miami Beach's first permanent synagogue, as well as the Jewish Museum of Florida-FIU.

At one time, South of Fifth was known as an area with a high rate of poverty and crime. But after years of development, the neighborhood became known for luxury.

South Pointe Park is a 17-acre park and promenade in this area that features a kids area, plenty of lush lawn for picnics, hills and walkways for outdoor exercising, and direct access to the beach. This family and pet friendly park is located in the same area as one of South Beach’s most historic restaurant: Joe's Stone Crab. Other famous restaurants include: Smith & Wollensky, Prime 112, Prime Italian, and Milos among others.

South of Fifth is home to some of Miami Beach's most luxurious condos like: Glass house, Portofino Tower, Apogee South Beach, Icon, Murano Grande, Murano at Portofino, Continuum Towers, Ocean House, South Pointe Tower and the Yacht Club At Portofino.
