= Thomas Kramer =

German-born real estate developer and venture capitalist

Thomas Kramer (born April 27, 1957) is a German-born real estate developer and venture capitalist, noteworthy for his part in the redevelopment of South Beach, Miami, Florida. Thomas Kramer's development projects include the Apogee, the Portofino Tower, the Murano Grande, and the Yacht Club.

== Biography ==
Kramer is the son of Frankfurt stockbroker Willi Kramer. "By the age of 13 he was making waves with a rabidly right-wing student newspaper he founded." Subsequently, he attended the Salem Boarding School. Kramer claims to have made his first million marks trading stock options from a payphone while still a student at the boarding school. Then Kramer took a brokerage apprenticeship in London and became a licensed broker. He joined his father's firm, before moving on to Shearson Lehman Brothers. He founded his own company in 1986, TK Kapitalverwaltung GmbH.

In the early 1990s, Kramer purchased for $45 million large portions of South Pointe, the southern tip of South Beach, a high-crime and poverty-stricken area. The deal allowed him to consolidate his holdings in a land swap. It also cleared zoning to allow the erection of the tallest buildings south of Manhattan. The whole area was turned into a premier residential area.

In 2000, Verena von Mitschke-Collande and Claudia Miller-Otto, heirs to the Giesecke+Devrient business, won a $90 million settlement against Kramer in a Swiss court. The plaintiffs had financed Thomas Kramer's real estate purchases in Miami, but when they intended to collect their money in 1995, Thomas Kramer tried to overturn the request and lost. When the Otto daughters launched the collect request in Florida, which included his 1.84 acres of Miami properties, Thomas Kramer transferred the majority of his assets to the Isle of Man.

In 2013, Kramer signed an agreement with Pakistani real estate tycoon Malik Riaz to build the first-ever Island City in Karachi, Pakistan, the Bundal & Buddo Islands, a deal worth US$20 billion. The deal fell through since Kramer failed to provide the necessary funds.

Kramer was subjected to a record fine for an individual from the Federal Election Commission. He donated to political candidates as a foreign citizen. This is illegal under United States campaign finance laws. He claimed he had been unaware of the prohibition, pointing out that he is a prominent, public figure and known to be a German citizen. He turned himself in to the FEC and immediately requested the refund of all political donations. The imposed fine was agreed upon as part of a voluntary conciliation agreement with the FEC. Howard Glicken pleaded guilty to criminal charges arising from the circumstance. He admitted soliciting donations from Kramer when he knew that Kramer was not a U.S. citizen.

In a hearing report made public in 2014, Thomas Kramer explained that he had lost all financial liability since that event. In August 2017, his house on Star Island was auctioned and sold for $40 million.

Following the loss of his Miami properties, Kramer relocated to Dubai. According to reports from 2023, he operates a consultancy service named "Fast Lane Dubai," assisting foreign companies with incorporation and residency in the United Arab Emirates. He also acts as an intermediary for international investors and family offices.

== Other activities ==
Thomas Kramer appeared on the third season of The Real Housewives of Atlanta and the second season of The Real Housewives of Miami.

== Philanthropy ==
Thomas Kramer created the Thomas Kramer Foundation, his main charitable vehicle.

In 1992, Thomas Kramer purchased the Woman in an Armchair, painted in 1932 by Pablo Picasso, for $2.86 million, well below the expected price of $3.5 million to $4.5 million.

== Personal life ==
In 1989, Kramer married Catherine Burda, granddaughter of the publisher Franz Burda I, and stepdaughter of Siegfried Otto. Otto himself had married into a money-printing business and was hiding 200 million Deutschmarks in Switzerland from German tax authorities which in 1992 he signed over to Kramer.

Kramer stated that after his daughter, Joya, moved in with him in Miami in 2010, he significantly shifted his lifestyle to focus on fitness and health.

Early in 1995, Kramer was arrested in Zurich after allegedly sexually assaulting a woman. Later that year, a second woman reported to Miami police that she had been raped by Kramer. In 1999, Kramer was charged in England with raping his secretary. In 2007, Kramer was arrested after a 13-year-old boy claimed Kramer had fondled him. Later in 2007, Kramer was sued by a woman who claimed he had grabbed her breast at a party.

== See also ==
- Apogee
- Portofino Tower
- Murano Grande
- Yacht Club
