= Icon at South Beach =

Residential building in Florida, United States

Coordinates: 25.773944°N 80.141074°W

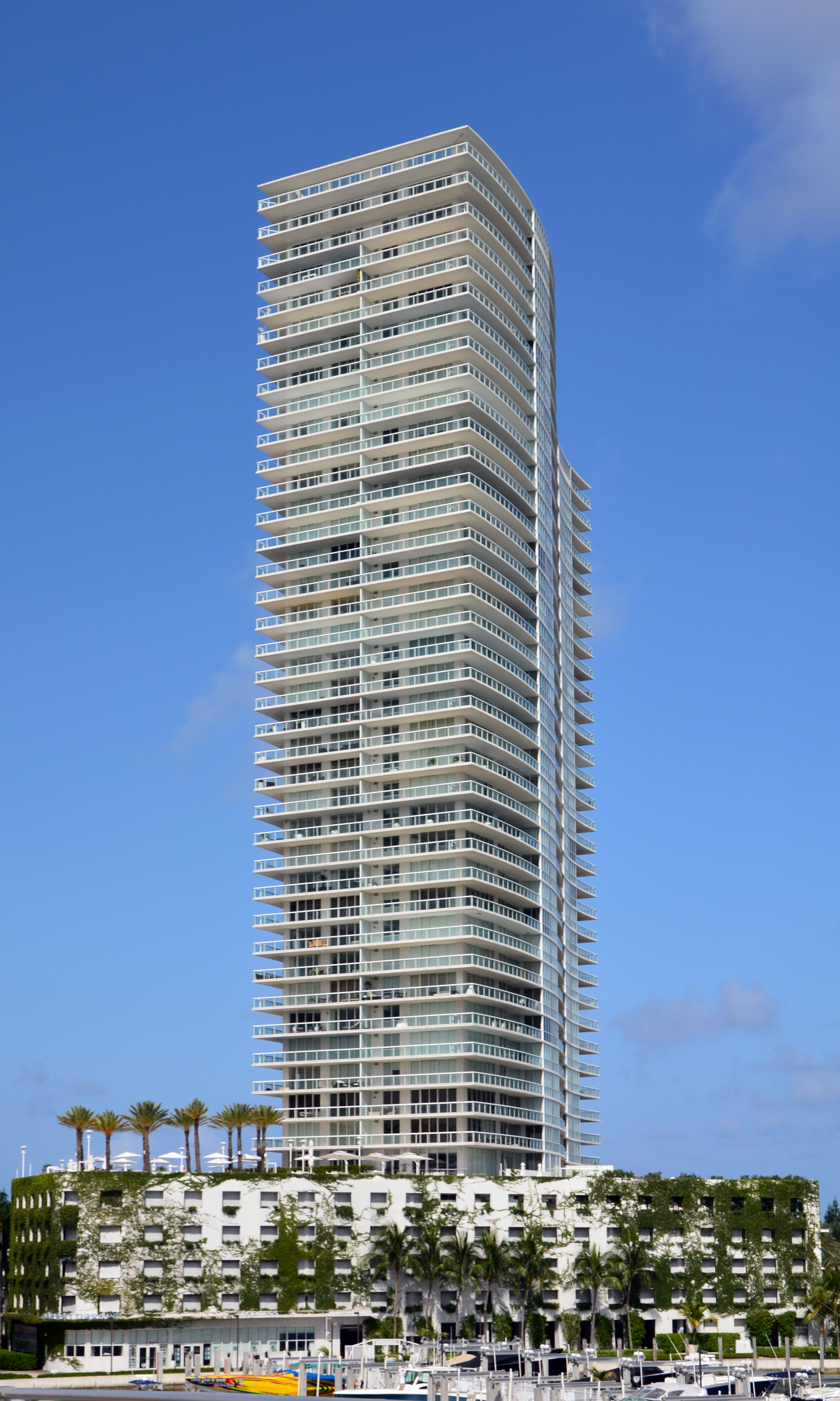
The ICON at South Beach residential tower in Miami Beach. Photo: Marc Averette

ICON at South Beach is a residential enclave tower /skyscraper in Miami Beach, Florida's South Beach. It is located directly on Biscayne Bay on the Miami Beach Marina. The tower, which opened in 2004, is 423 ft (129 m) tall and has 42 floors. It is located in the "SOFI" (South of Fifth Street) neighborhood.

It is the eighth tallest skyscraper in Miami Beach.

Icon on South Beach was designed by Philippe Starck and developed by the Related Group of Florida.

== See also ==
- List of tallest buildings in Miami Beach
