= Saint Mary Parish, Jamaica =

Parish of Jamaica

Coordinates: 18°19′N 76°54′W

Saint Mary Sint Mieri
- Parish
- Saint Mary in Jamaica
- Country: Jamaica
- County: Middlesex
- Capital: Port Maria
- Major towns: Highgate, Jamaica, Oracabessa, Richmond, Annotto Bay

Area
  - Total: 610 km^{2} (240 sq mi)
  - Rank: 10

Population (2012)
  - Total: 114,227
  - Density: 190/km^{2} (480/sq mi)
- Demonym: Saint Maryese

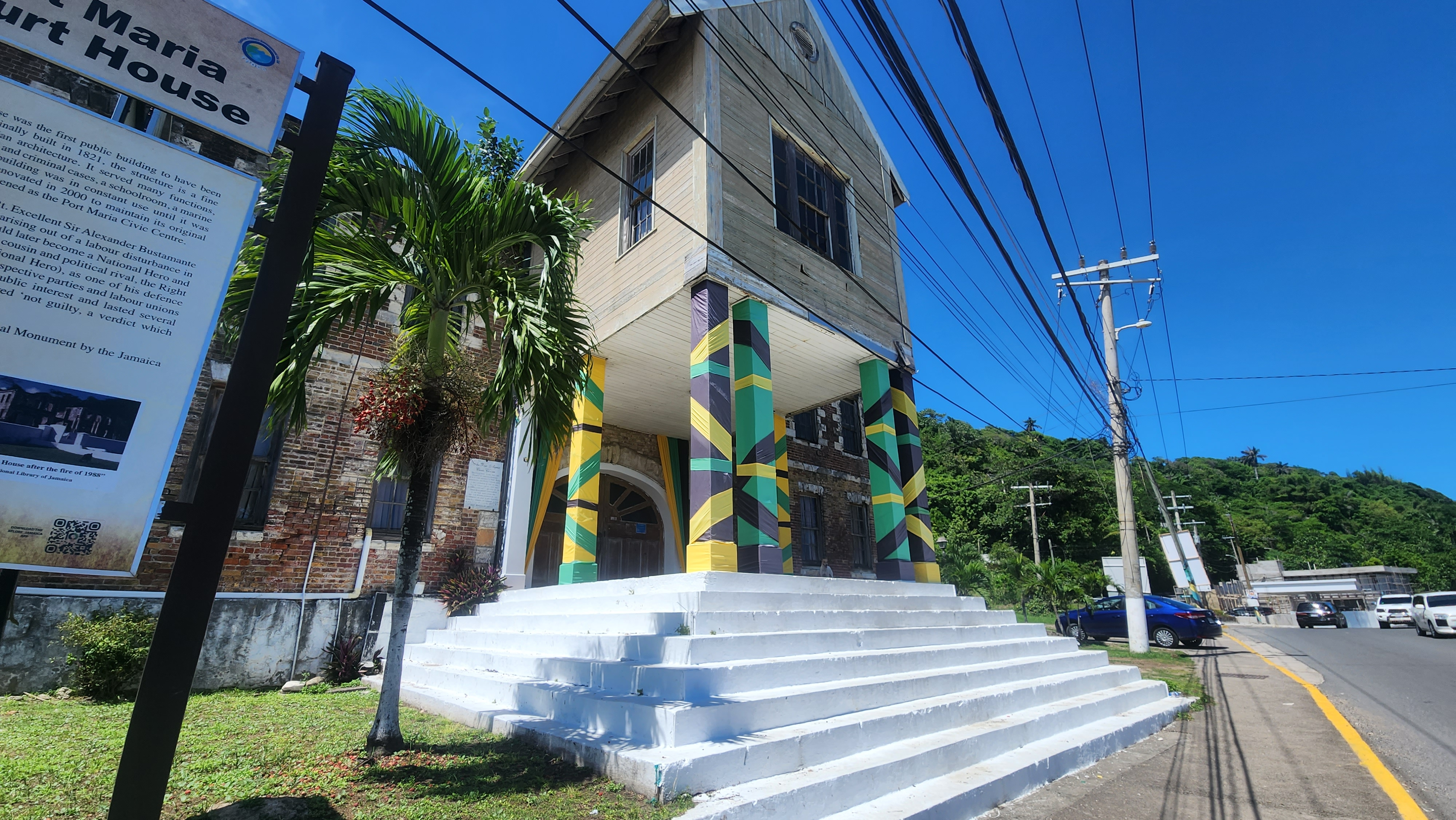
Port Maria Civic Centre, once the St.Mary Parish Courthouse

Saint Mary (Jamaican Patois: Sint Mieri) is a parish located in the northeast section of Jamaica. With a population of 114,227, it is one of Jamaica's smallest parishes, located in the county of Middlesex. Its chief town and capital is Port Maria, located on the coast.

The parish is the birthplace of established dancehall reggae artists, including Capleton, Lady Saw, Ninjaman, Ini Kamoze, Sizzla, and Tanya Stephens. Other notable residents of St. Mary parish include author Colin Simpson, who is the great-great-grandson of abolitionist James Phillippo, Jamaican writer and community activist Erna Brodber, and music producer Chris Blackwell, who produced later works of reggae icon Bob Marley.

== History ==
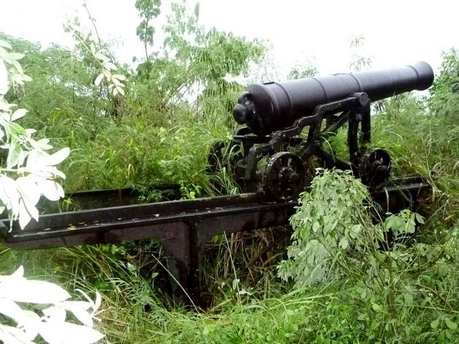
A cannon at Fort Haldane

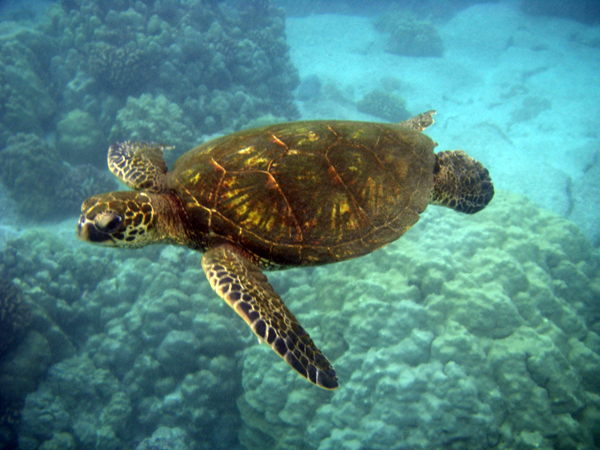
Sea Turtle in Oracabessa Bay Fish Sanctuary

There are a few traces of Taíno/Arawak presence in the parish. Saint Mary was also one of the first sections of the island to be occupied by the Spaniards. Puerto Santa Maria was the second town the Spaniards built on the island. In 1655, after the English captured Jamaica from the Spanish, the north coastal town of Santa Maria became known as Port Maria.

One of St. Mary's most famous early residents was Sir Henry Morgan, who had a home on the hill overlooking Port Maria. The property offered a commanding view of the St. Mary harbour and provided Morgan with a strategic vantage point and featured a secret escape tunnel to Port Maria. Morgan's home was later purchased by Sir Noël Coward and is located beside Fort Haldane.

Fort Haldane was built in 1759 to protect the strategic harbour of Port Maria from Spanish raids. It was also used as a garrison to keep the enslaved and working classes of St. Mary under control. It was named after General George Haldane, then Governor of Jamaica. The fort's cannons were strategically positioned on a hill facing seaward over Port Maria for protection. Fort Haldane served a pivotal role in the famous Tacky's rebellion, one of Jamaica's bloodiest rebellions against slavery in 1760. On Easter Sunday, a runaway slave known as Tacky and a small group of slaves from neighboring plantations murdered their masters and marched to Port Maria where they killed the guards at Fort Haldane and stole several barrels of gunpowder and firearms. They fought alongside hundreds of other slaves for five months but their rebellion was ultimately quashed by the British colonial authorities and the skilled Jamaican Maroons from Scott's Hall. A Maroon officer from Scott's Hall, Davy the Maroon, shot Tacky dead following a fierce gunbattle.

Descendants of the Maroons carried on their struggle after the abolition of slavery and they joined with Reverend James Phillippo in his quest to establish one of his Free Villages in St. Mary. Phillippo built the first church in Oracabessa and led a defiant protest against the local landowner's refusal to sell land to former slaves. The Maroons joined Phillippo in a show of force that led to the landowner's capitulation and the sale of enough land to build homes for the local population. St. Mary's present size was determined in 1867, when the parish of Metcalfe was merged with St Mary.

One of the largest landowners in Saint Mary at the turn of the 20th Century was Blanche Blackwell, mother of Chris Blackwell. Blanche sold plots of land from Oracabessa to Port Maria to her coterie of friends, including playwright Noël Coward, U.S. Ambassador Ruth Bryan Owen, and James Bond author Ian Fleming. Noël Coward's Firefly Estate is designated as a National Historic site, and overlooks St. Mary Harbour.

The first James Bond film, Dr. No was filmed in part in Saint Mary Parish, including in the Oracabessa river.

In the 1990s, the Island Outpost Corporation developed one of St. Mary's best-known tourist attractions, the James Bond Beach and the facility includes a concert pavilion as well as a large bar/restaurant.

St. Mary is home to the Oracabessa Bay Fish Sanctuary, which was established in 2011 to protect the marine ecosystem in Oracabessa Bay. The eastern perimeter of the Oracabessa Bay Fish Sanctuary is located on the edge of the Cayman Trough with walls that begin at 60 ft. and drop down to over 150 ft. These walls are covered in a large variety of hard and soft corals. The walls contain many overhangs and ledges and are home to lobsters, king crab, green and spotted moray eels, and a host of other marine creatures. Beyond the boundaries of the Oracabessa Bay Fish Sanctuary, the Cayman Trough plunges to depths of over 25,000 ft and is renowned for deep-water sport fishing including marlin and tuna.

== Geography ==
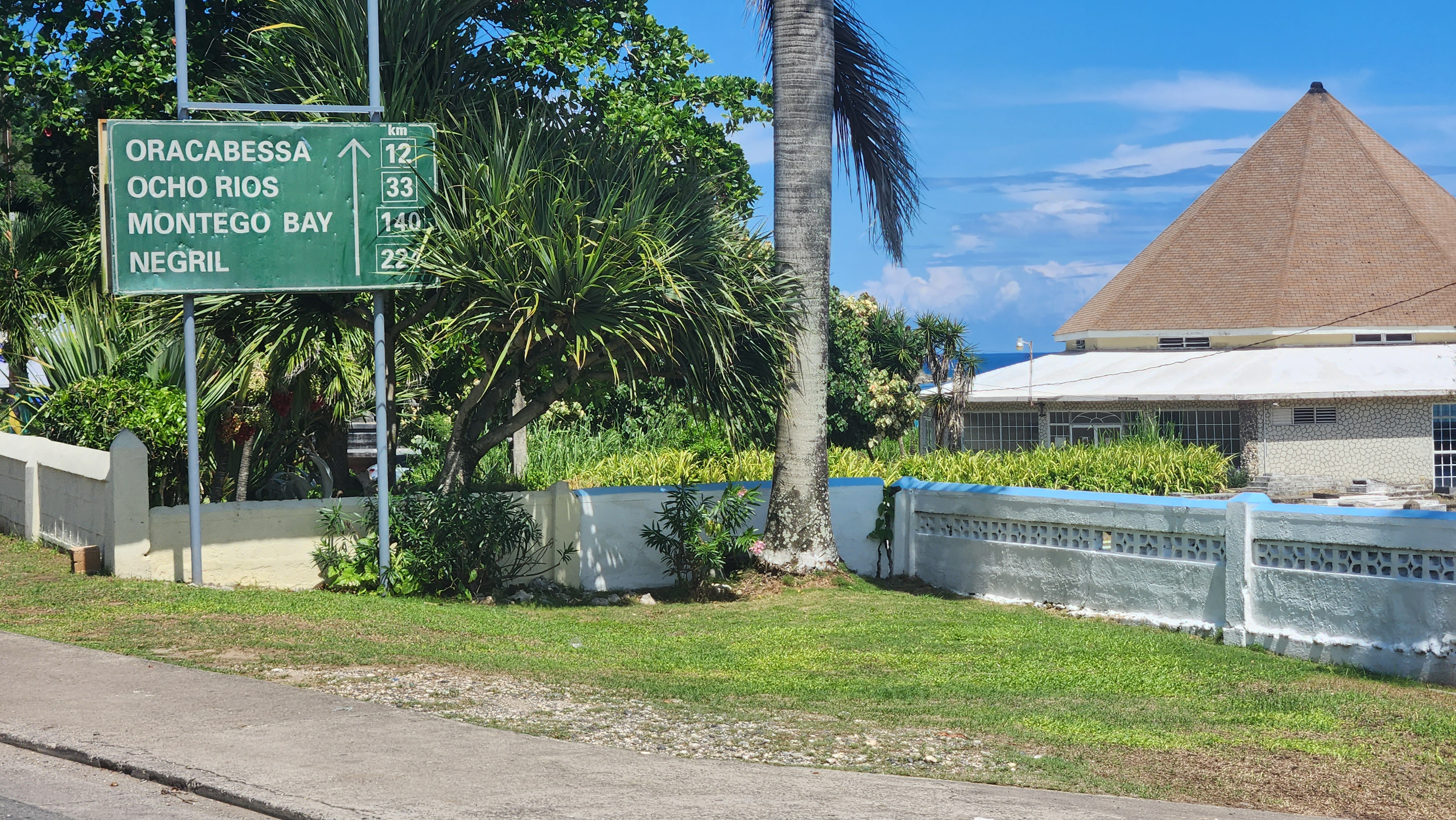
Port Maria Mile marker opposite the Courthouse

St. Mary is located at latitude 18°09'N, longitude 77°03'W. It is bordered by Portland in the east, St. Ann in the west, and parts of St. Catherine and St. Andrew in the south.

The parish covers an area of 610 km^{2}, making it Jamaica's fifth smallest parish. The terrain is mountainous, rising up to almost 1,200 metres (4,000 ft) at the highest point, but there are no distinctive mountain ranges. The climate is varied, like most parishes on the island. The eastern section of the parish has shale rock and an intricate surface draining pattern, while the western section is limestone with predominantly underground rivers.

There are three main rivers in Saint Mary, the Rio Nuevo, Wag Water River and White River.

== Commerce ==
The parish has a good variety of agricultural resources. The principal products are bananas, sugar, citrus, pimento, cocoa, coconuts, coffee, vegetables, breadfruit and annatto. Pastoralism is also practiced. In recent years, however, agriculture has been on the decline, which may be due to the problems that Jamaican banana export has been facing.

Saintt Mary Parish, had once been listed as one of the poorest in Jamaica, but over the past 10 years there have been substantial improvements in the economy due to the influx of investments in infrastructure, including a new international airport (Ian Fleming International Airport), a new highway, and development of luxury resorts, such as Goldeneye and Golden Clouds. The new intercoastal highway constructed in 2005 has benefited the parish and has brought a significant increase to tourism-related activities.

Essential services includes banking and postal services. There are hospitals located in Port Maria and Annotto Bay, as well as public health clinics in Highgate, Oracabessa and Boscobel.

== Tourism ==
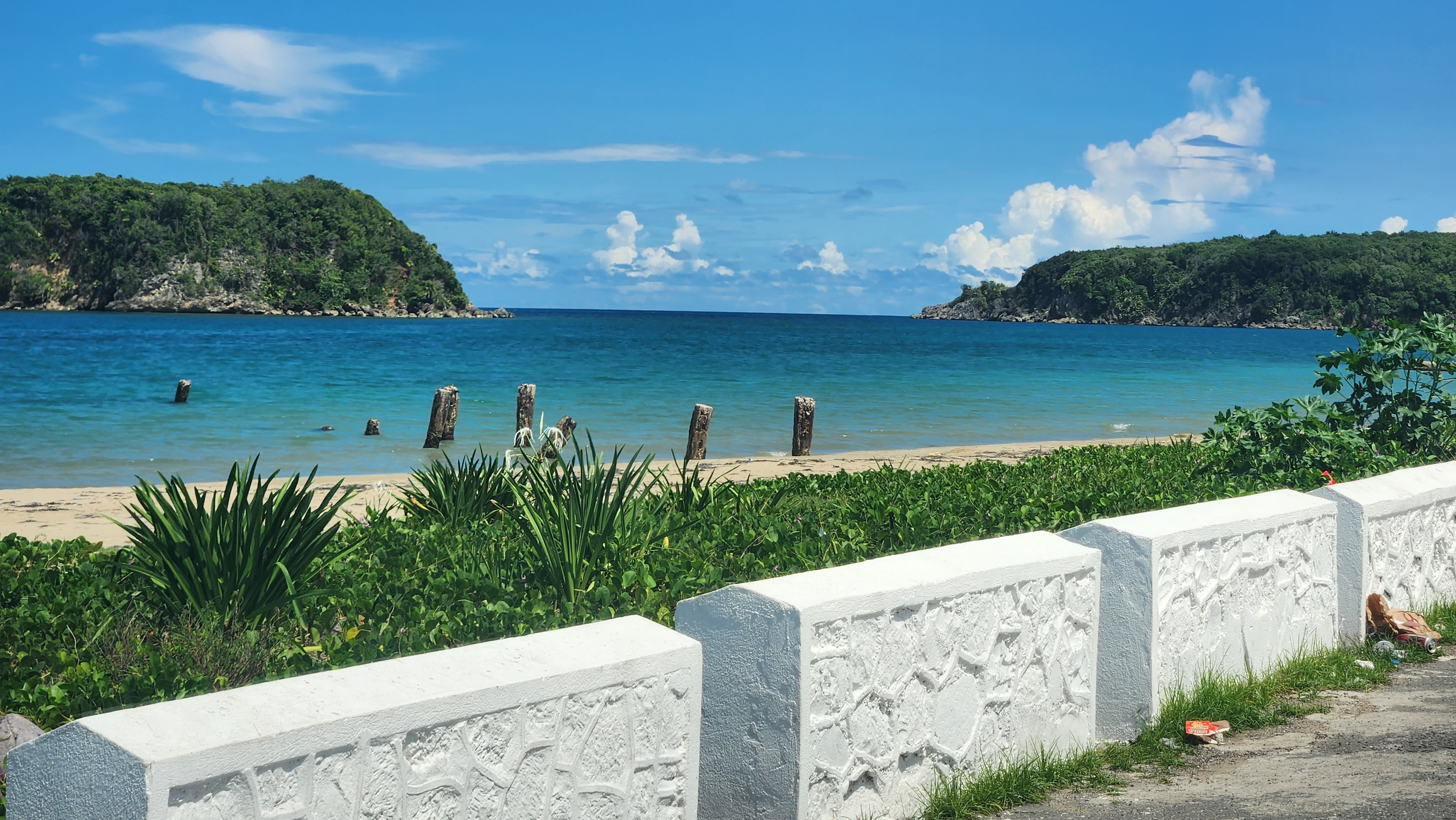
Pagee Beach near Main St., Port Maria

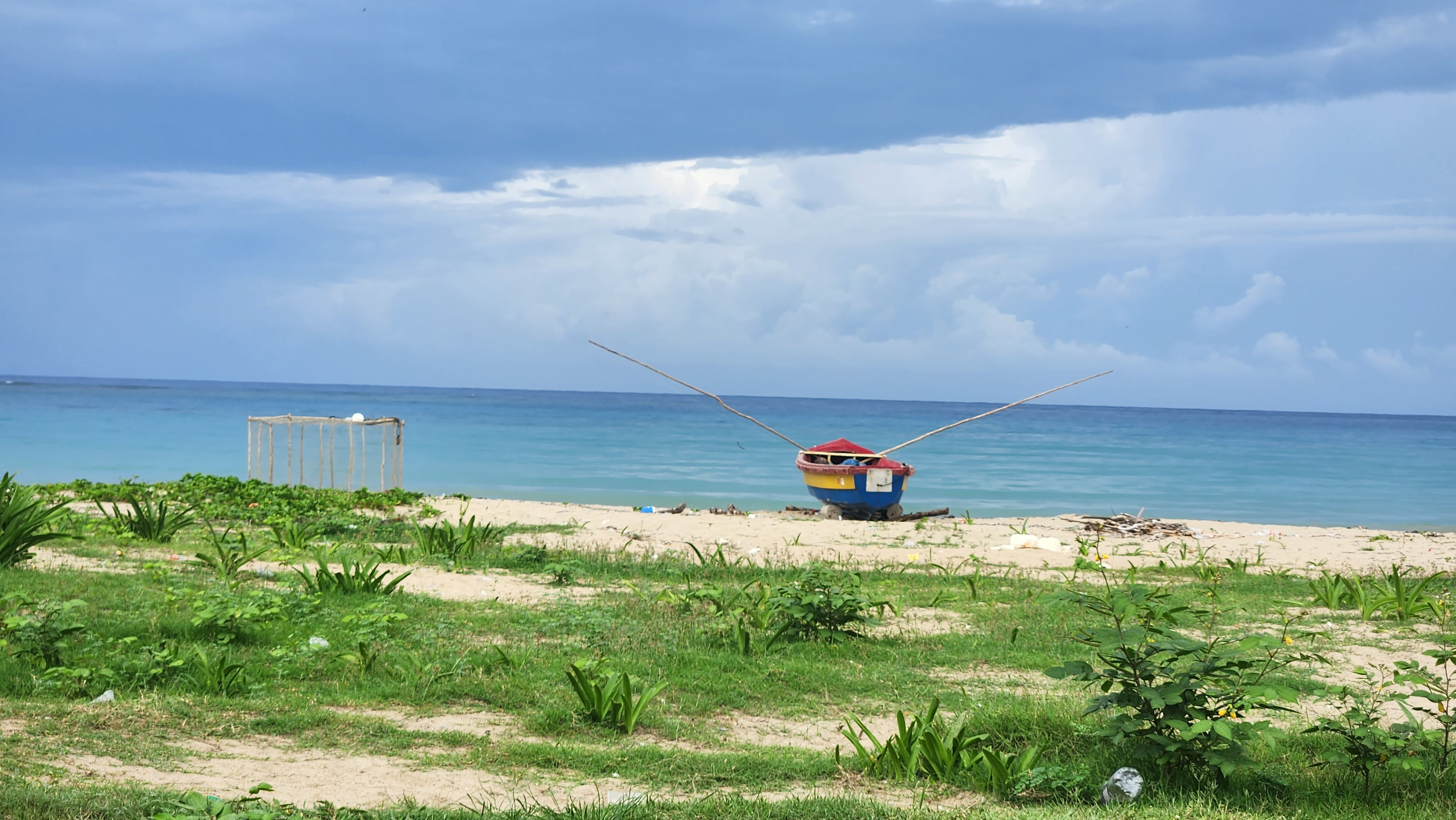
Pagee Beach

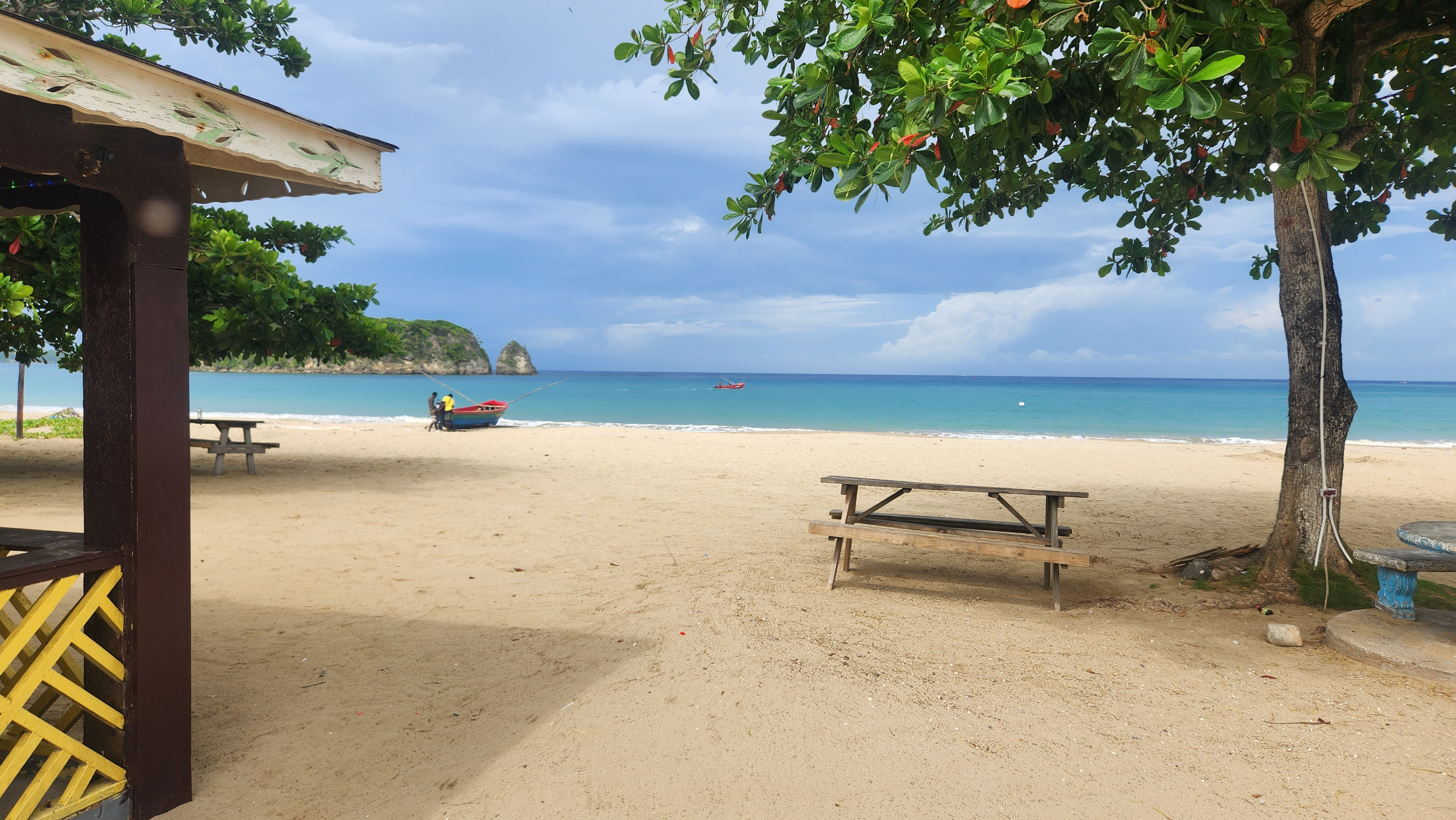
D'Shore beach club

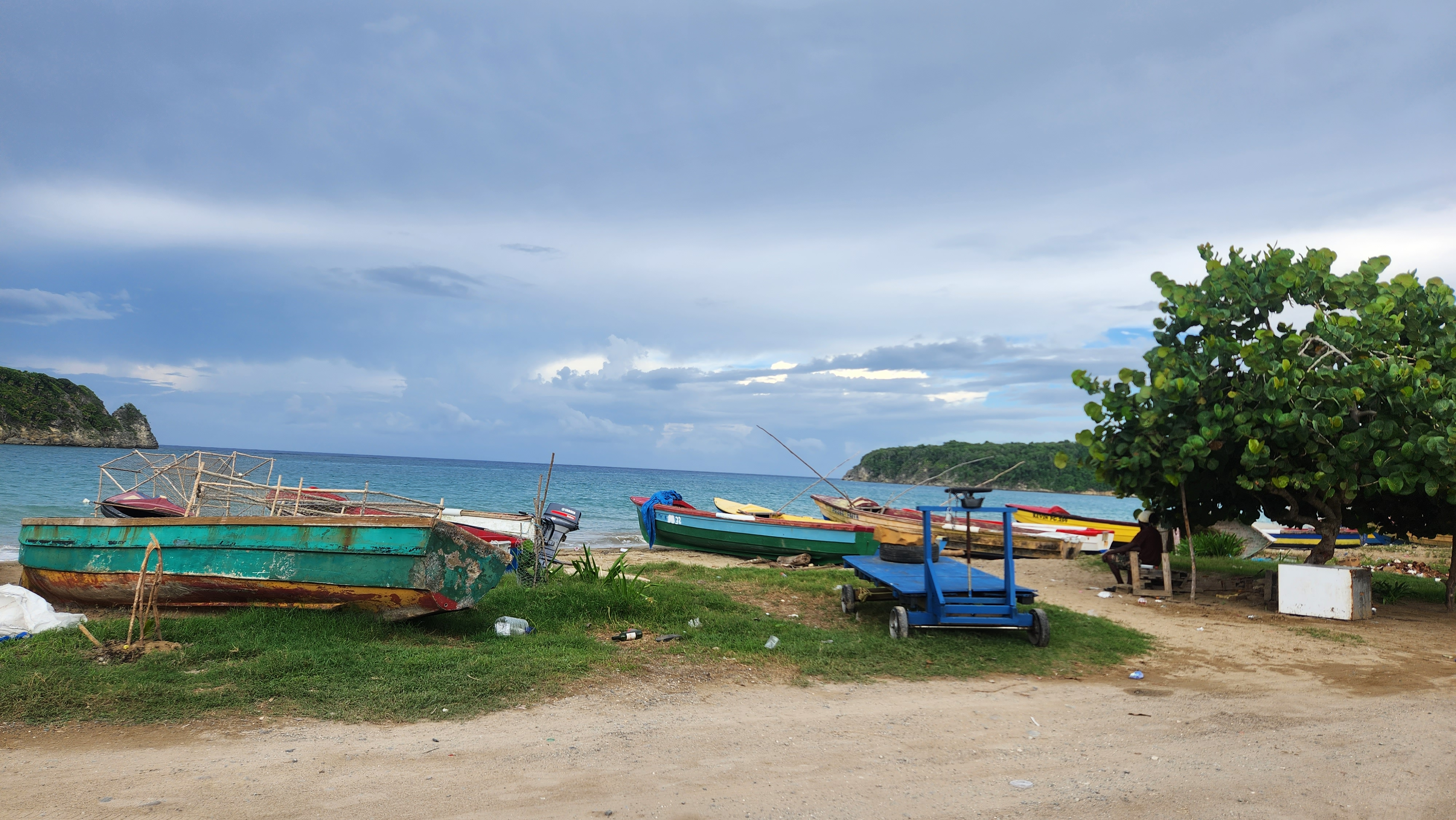
Pagee Fishing Boats

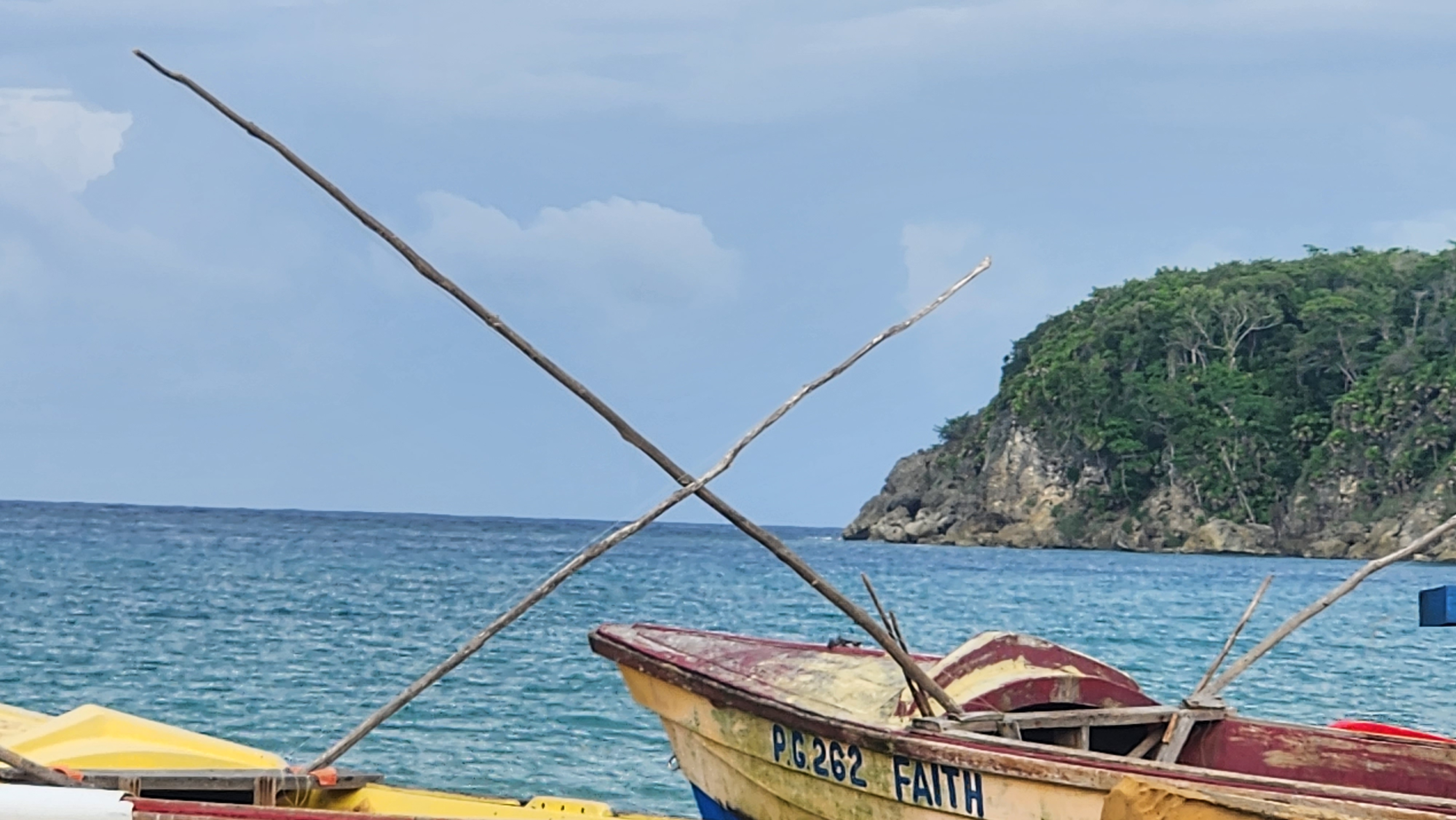
Pagee Fishing Boats

Tourism has become an increasingly important source of income for parishioners of St. Mary. Some of the most well known resorts in St. Mary include Couples Sans Souci, Couples Tower Isle, Beaches Boscobel, Goldeneye and Golden Clouds. Ian Fleming International Airport provides private jet service for these luxurious properties as well as emergency airlift and general passenger service. Two of the most popular beaches in St. Mary are James Bond Beach and Reggae Beach.

== Politics ==
Saint Mary Parish is covered by three parliamentary constituencies:

- Saint Mary Central
- Saint Mary South Eastern
- Saint Mary Western

== Notable people ==
Notable people who live or have lived in Saint Mary parish include:

- Esther Anderson, filmmaker, actress
- Aleen Bailey, Olympic gold-medal winner
- Chris Blackwell, award-winning music producer
- Ruth Bryan Owen, U.S. Ambassador
- Capleton, reggae and dancehall artist
- Noël Coward, award-winning playwright
- Christine Day, Olympic medalist
- Stephen deRoux, professional soccer player
- Clancy Eccles, ska and reggae singer
- Ian Fleming, bestselling author
- Alfred Constantine Goffe, Banana king of Port Maria
- Andy Hamilton, jazz saxophonist and composer
- Beres Hammond, reggae singer
- Lisa Hanna, Member of Parliament, Minister of Youth and Culture, Miss Jamaica World 1993, Miss World 1993
- Perry Henzell, movie director
- Ini Kamoze, reggae singer
- Kiddus I, reggae singer
- Lady Saw, Grammy-award-winning DJ and reggae singer
- Audrey Marks, Jamaican ambassador to the U.S.
- Beverly McDonald, Olympic gold-medal winner
- Danny McFarlane, Olympic medalist
- Count Prince Miller, actor and musician
- Ninjaman, dancehall DJ
- Pan Head, ragga-dancehall DJ
- Georgianna Robertson, fashion model and actress
- Oliver Samuels, Comedian
- Colin Simpson, bestselling author and musician
- Tanya Stephens, reggae singer
- Admiral Tibet, dancehall singer and recording artist
- Richard Von White, internationally renowned artist
- Josey Wales, dancehall DJ
