= Goldeneye (estate) =

Building in Oracabessa, Jamaica

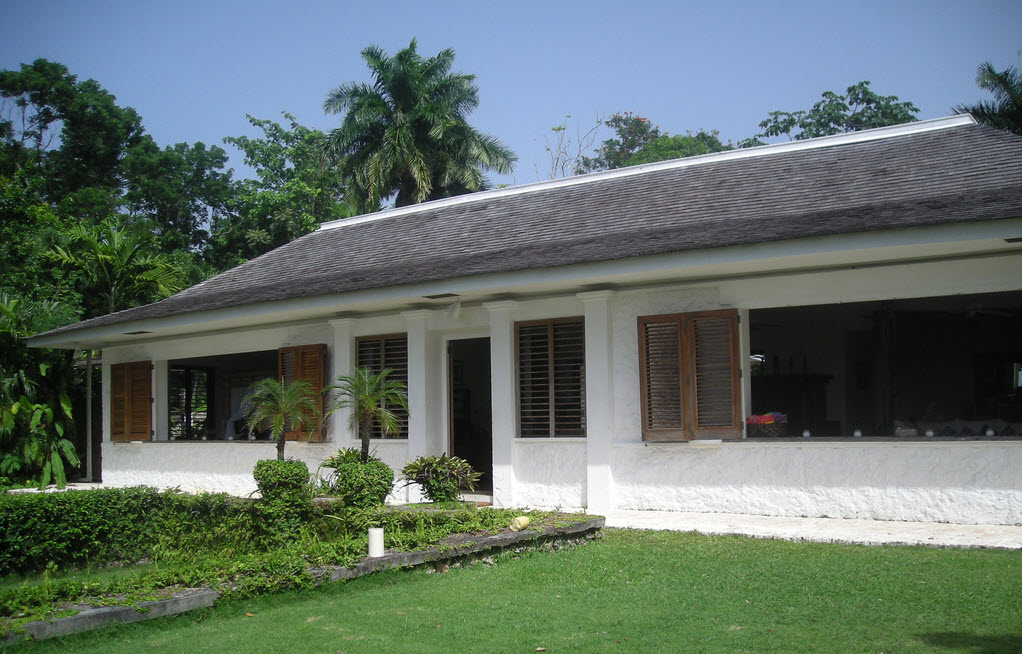
Goldeneye estate

Goldeneye is the original name of novelist Ian Fleming's estate on Oracabessa Bay on the northern coastline of Jamaica. He bought 15 acres (6.1 ha) adjacent to the Golden Clouds estate in 1946 and built his home on the edge of a cliff overlooking a private beach. The three-bedroom structure was constructed from Fleming's sketch, fitted with wooden jalousie windows and a swimming pool. Fleming's visitors at Goldeneye included actors, musicians, and filmmakers, among others.

As of 2010, the property operates as Goldeneye Hotel and Resort, consisting of Fleming's main house and several cottages, and it continues to host celebrities as resort guests. The Goldeneye resort is ranked as one of the most exclusive hotels in Jamaica.

The estate is located in the Oracabessa Bay Fish Sanctuary, established in 2011 to protect the area's marine ecosystem. It is adjacent to James Bond Beach, which has served as a concert venue.

== History ==
In spite of its obvious proximity to Golden Clouds, Fleming claimed a number of origins for the name Goldeneye, including Carson McCullers's 1941 novel, Reflections in a Golden Eye, and Operation Goldeneye, a Second World War era contingency plan Fleming had developed in case of a Nazi invasion of Gibraltar through Spain.

Fleming joined The Sunday Times in 1946, for which he oversaw the paper's worldwide network of correspondents. He negotiated a contract whereby he could spend three months of each year at Goldeneye. Here he entertained Ann Fleming. Ann was then married to Lord Rothermere, who thought Ann was staying with Noël Coward.

On 17 February 1952, Fleming began writing his first Bond novel, Casino Royale, at Goldeneye. For the next 12 years, Fleming wrote all his Bond stories there. A number of the Bond movies, including Dr. No and Live and Let Die, were filmed near the estate. On Her Majesty's Secret Service, the first novel published after the Bond film series officially launched, was written at Goldeneye while Dr. No was being filmed nearby.

In 1956, British Prime Minister Sir Anthony Eden and his wife Clarissa spent a month at Goldeneye after Eden's health collapsed in the wake of the Suez Crisis. The attendant publicity helped to boost Fleming's writing career.

On 5 February 1964, the ornithologist James Bond paid Fleming a surprise visit at Goldeneye. Fleming had seen Bond's name on the cover of his book Birds of the West Indies and used it to name his character James Bond. Previously unseen footage of the two meeting at Goldeneye was featured in the 2022 documentary The Other Fellow.

In 1976, 12 years after Ian Fleming's death, the property was sold to reggae musician Bob Marley. A year later, he sold the estate to Island Records founder Chris Blackwell. Blackwell gradually added 25 acres (10 ha) in small parcels to the original estate to reach a current total of 40 acres (16 ha). As it grew, he also added various cottages and huts around an inner lagoon sandwiched between James Bond Beach and Low Cay Beach. In the late 1980s, he formed the company Island Outpost and opened the property as a small hotel.

The name Goldeneye has found its way into the James Bond film and television franchises. It was used in the 1991 animated series James Bond Jr, where it became the name of a valuable pendant worn by a prince in the episode "Ship of Terror". It was more famously used again in 1995, when GoldenEye became the title of the 17th James Bond film, the first to star Pierce Brosnan, and in the 1997 video game GoldenEye 007.

In the 2021 film No Time to Die, Bond's retirement in Jamaica is a nod to Fleming's life at Goldeneye.

== Hotel and resort ==
Goldeneye Hotel

- Location within Jamaica

General information
- Location: Oracabessa
- Coordinates: 18°24′39″N 76°56′37″W
- Owner: Chris Blackwell
- Operator: Island Outpost

Website
- www.goldeneye.com

Rather than a traditional hotel, Goldeneye resort is a compound of tropical buildings, gardens and private beaches. It closed in 2007 for major additions and renovations, and reopened in December 2010.

According to Condé Nast Traveler, "Few places manage to condense the sheer joy of island living as successfully as Jamaica's favorite hotel." The magazine described the hotel as "hip, friendly, respectful." In August 2024, Caribbean Journal ranked Goldeneye resort as one of the 10 best hotels in Jamaica.

=== Guests ===
Fleming's Goldeneye became the social epicenter of Jamaica's north coast along with nearby Firefly owned by Noël Coward, and Bolt House, owned by Chris Blackwell's mother, Blanche, who was a long time friend of Fleming. The property was popular with a coterie of Hollywood stars and British literary greats as it was British aristocrats and international heads of state. Errol Flynn, Lucian Freud, Truman Capote, Patrick Leigh Fermor, the Duchess of Devonshire, Princess Margaret and Prime Minister Anthony Eden were visitors.

The Goldeneye of the Blackwell era has also attracted celebrities, both as his friends and resort guests, among them Martha Stewart, Grace Jones, Bono (who would later co-author and perform the title song of the Bond movie "Golden Eye"), Naomi Campbell, Michael Caine, Pierce Brosnan, Harrison Ford, Johnny Depp, Kate Moss, and Richard Branson. Sting wrote "Every Breath You Take" at Fleming's writing desk while vacationing on the estate in 1982.

In 2015, Anthony Bourdain stayed at Goldeneye, which was featured in the fourth season of the series Anthony Bourdain: Parts Unknown. Bourdain thanked Blackwell for hosting him and for "many excellent rum punches."

English-Albanian singer Dua Lipa stayed at Goldeneye in 2023. Adele has also stayed at Goldeneye, claiming she "met God" and "baptized herself" at the resort.

=== Garden ===
Sir Anthony Eden started a tree-planting tradition at Goldeneye when he and his wife, Clarissa, planted a Santa Maria tree before departing from the hotel, and the tradition is still ongoing. Today, there are hundreds of mango, lime, orange and ackee trees in the garden. Each was planted by a guest, with a plaque stating who planted it and when. A $1,000 required donation goes to the Oracabessa Foundation, which promotes sustainable development in the town of Oracabessa.

== See also ==
- List of hotels in Jamaica
