= Reggae Beach =

- Beach
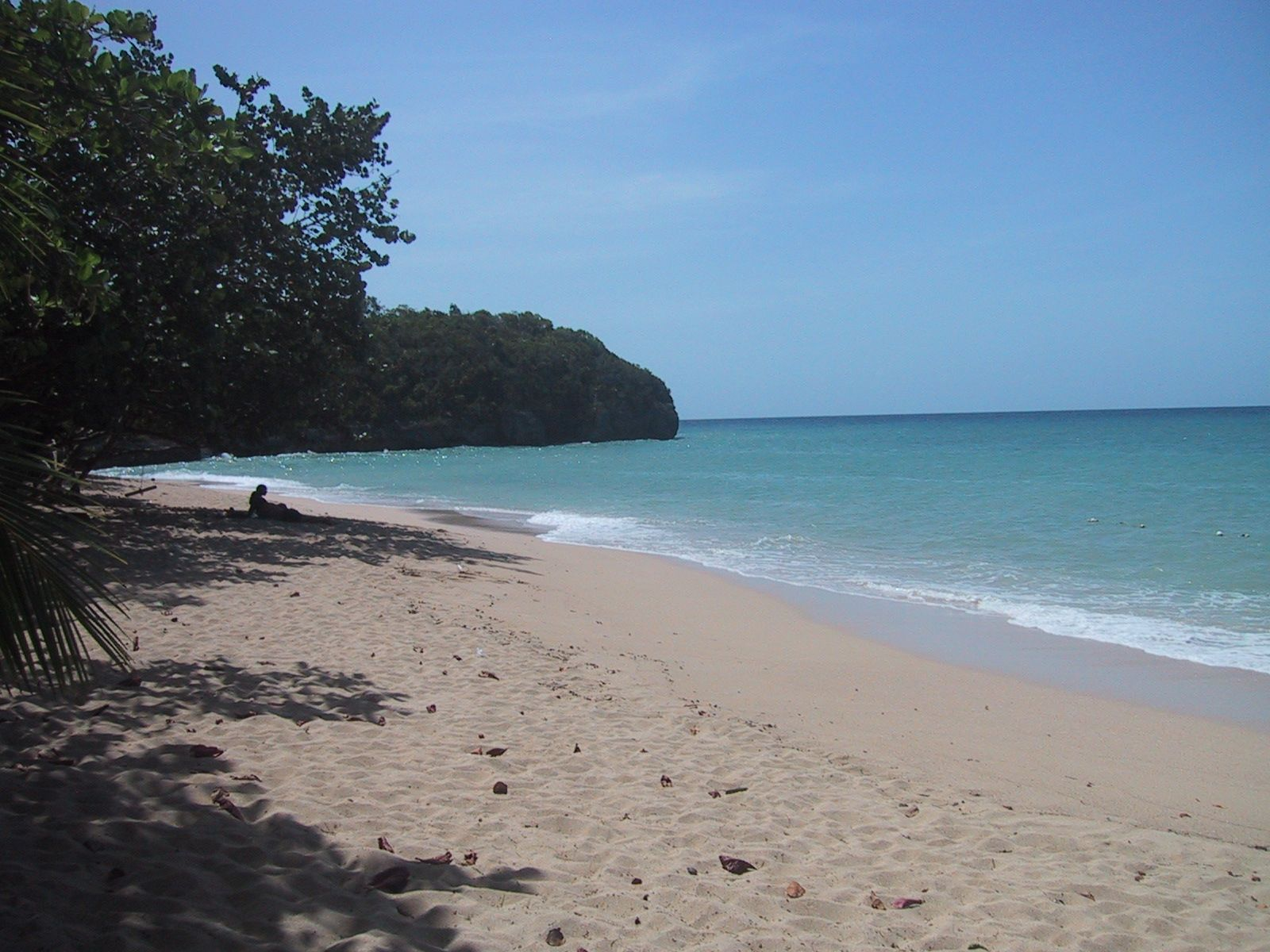
- Reggae Beach, St. Mary , Jamaica.

- Location within Jamaica
- Coordinates: 18.4214964°N 77.0440936°W
- Country: Jamaica
- Parish: St. Mary,
- Time zone: UTC-5 (EST)

Reggae Beach was a 250-acre property which was located in Jamaica, midway between Ocho Rios and Oracabessa.

In 2008, the Caribbean Urban Music Awards were presented at Reggae Beach, which were based on the votes of over 1.5 million Caribbean music fans worldwide. Award recipients present at the ceremony were Beenie Man, Sly and Robbie, and Spragga Benz.

In 2010, Reggae Beach was voted by Readers of Lonely Planet guidebook and magazine as the Greatest Cultural Tourism Experience. The award was announced in August 2010. Reggae Beach in Jamaica placed first, ahead of Ballet at the Mariinsky Theatre in St. Petersburg, Salsa dancing in Havana, Opera in Italy, and authentic Blues in Chicago.

The property is owned by Jamaican-Canadian businessman, Michael Lee-Chin.
