= List of shipwrecks in March 1835 =

The list of shipwrecks in March 1835 includes ships sunk, foundered, wrecked, grounded or otherwise lost during March 1835.

== 1 March ==
List of shipwrecks: 1 March 1835
Ship	State	Description
Uxbridge	United Kingdom	The ship was driven ashore near Westport, County Mayo. She was on a voyage from Glasgow, Renfrewshire to Westport.

== 2 March ==
List of shipwrecks: 2 March 1835
Ship	State	Description
Aspasia	United States	The ship was driven ashore and wrecked at Troon, Ayrshire, United Kingdom. She was on a voyage from Savannah, Georgia, United States to the Clyde.
Brunswick	United Kingdom	The ship was driven ashore on Spurn Point, Yorkshire. She was on a voyage from Hull, Yorkshire to Dunkerque, Nord, France. She was later refloated and taken in to Grimsby, Lincolnshire.
Catherine	United Kingdom	The ship was wrecked at Milford Haven, Pembrokeshire.
Despatch	United Kingdom	The ship was driven ashore west of Killybegs, County Donegal. She was on a voyage from Liverpool, Lancashire to Ballyshannon, County Donegal.
Eroe	United States	The ship foundered off Tarifa, Spain. She was on a voyage from Gibraltar to Boston, Massachusetts.
James Holmes	United Kingdom	The barque ran aground and sank at Whitehaven, Cumberland. Her crew survived. She was on a voyage from Demerara to Dublin.
Lively	United Kingdom	The ship departed from Drogheda, County Louth for Irvine, Ayrshire. No further trace, presumed foundered with the loss of all hands.
Margaret	United Kingdom	The ship was driven ashore at Magilligan, County Londonderry. She was on a voyage from Workington, Cumberland to Londonderry.
Sarah	United Kingdom	The ship was in collision with Silas Richards (United States) and sank with the loss of seven of the seventeen people on board. Sarah was on a voyage from Liverpool to Charleston, South Carolina, United States.
Silza	United Kingdom	The ship was driven ashore and wrecked on Spurn Point. She was on a voyage from Goole, Yorkshire to London.
Two Brothers	United Kingdom	The ship sank near South Shields, County Durham. She was refloated on 5 March and beached.
Venelia	Netherlands	The ship was driven ashore near Hellevoetsluis, South Holland, She was on a voyage from Hellevoetsluis to Boston, Massachusetts, United States.
William	United Kingdom	The schooner foundered in the Irish Sea off Rossall, Lancashire. Her four crew survived.
Zebulon	United Kingdom	The ship sank in the River Mersey at Liverpool.

== 3 March ==
List of shipwrecks: 3 March 1835
Ship	State	Description
Assiduous	United Kingdom	The ship was driven ashore at Spurn Point, Yorkshire. She was on a voyage from Wainfleet, Lincolnshire to Leeds or Wakefield, Yorkshire. Assiduous was refloated on 20 March and proceeded to Wakefield.
British Oak	United Kingdom	The ship was driven onto rocks at Derbyhaven, Isle of Man. She was on a voyage from Whitehaven, Cumberland to Dublin.
Castle Hill	United Kingdom	The ship was driven ashore in Loch Indaal.
Ebenezer	United Kingdom	The sloop capsized in the North Sea off Robin Hoods Bay, Yorkshire. Her crew were rescued by Exchange (United Kingdom).
Juno	United Kingdom	The ship was driven ashore at Peel, Isle of Man with the loss of a crew member. She was on a voyage from Belfast, County Down to Liverpool, Lancashire.
Pallas	United Kingdom	The ship was lost on the Hinder Bank, in the North Sea. Her crew were rescued. She was on a voyage from Sunderland, County Durham to Schiedam, South Holland, Netherlands.
William	United Kingdom	The ship was run down and sunk in Liverpool Bay by the barque Louisa (United Kingdom) Her thirteen crew survived. William was on a voyage from Liverpool, Lancashire to Jamaica.
William & Alexander	United Kingdom	The ship was driven ashore at Whitby, Yorkshire. Her crew were rescued.

== 4 March ==
List of shipwrecks: 4 March 1835
Ship	State	Description
Othello	United Kingdom	The ship was driven ashore at Hellevoetsluis, South Holland, Netherlands. She was on a voyage from Rotterdam, South Holland to Liverpool, Lancashire. Othello was refloated on 10 March.

== 5 March ==
List of shipwrecks: 5 March 1835
Ship	State	Description
Fame	United Kingdom	The ship was driven ashore at Vlissingen, Zeeland, Netherlands.
Laurentina Hendrika	Netherlands	The ship was driven ashore at Brielle, South Holland. Her crew were rescued. She was on a voyage from Bordeaux, Gironde, France to Rotterdam, South Holland.

== 6 March ==
List of shipwrecks: 6 March 1835
Ship	State	Description
Chance	United Kingdom	The ship foundered in the North Sea off Brielle, Zeeland, Netherlands. Her crew were rescued. She was on a voyage from Lisbon, Portugal to Rotterdam, South Holland, Netherlands.

== 7 March ==
List of shipwrecks: 7 March 1835
Ship	State	Description
Active	United Kingdom	The ship was driven ashore at Cemaes, Anglesey. She was on a voyage from Liverpool, Lancashire to Belfast, County Antrim.
Ann	United Kingdom	The ship was driven ashore in the Menai Strait. She was on a voyage from Buenos Aires, Argentina to Liverpool.
Bell	United Kingdom	The brig was driven ashore at "Port Cunan", Wigtownshire. Her crew were rescued. She was on a voyage from Dublin to Irvine, Ayrshire.
Climax	United Kingdom	The ship was driven ashore and wrecked at Cullercoats, Northumberland. Her crew were rescued.
Conference	United Kingdom	The ship was wrecked on the Gunfleet Sand, in the North Sea off the coast of Essex. Her crew were rescued.
Dundee	United Kingdom	The ship was driven ashore on Bornholm, Denmark. Her crew were rescued. She was on a voyage from Memel, Prussia to Porto, Portugal.
Effort	United Kingdom	The ship was driven ashore on Vlieland, Friesland, Netherlands. Her crew were rescued. She was on a voyage from London to Hamburg.
Endeavour	United Kingdom	The brig was driven ashore at Blakeney, Norfolk. She was on a voyage from Sunderland, County Durham to Brighton, Sussex.
Fountain	United Kingdom	The ship was driven ashore at Flamborough Head, Yorkshire. She was refloated on 15 March and taken in to Bridlington, Yorkshire.
Galatea	United Kingdom	The ship was driven ashore and damaged at Flamborough Head. Her crew were rescued. She was refloated on 15 March and taken in to Bridlington.
George IV	United Kingdom	The ship was driven ashore north of Ramsey, Isle of Man. She was on a voyage from Demerara to the Clyde. George IV was refloated on 10 March and taken in to Ramsey.
Gleaner	United Kingdom	The ship was wrecked on the East Hoyle Bank, in Liverpool Bay. Her crew were rescued. She was on a voyage from Liverpool to Ayr.
Hero	United Kingdom	The ship struck the Knowle Sand and lost her rudder. She was consequently driven ashore and wrecked at Lowestoft, Suffolk. She was on a voyage from Memel, Prussia to Poole, Dorset.
Humphrey	United Kingdom	The full-rigged ship lost her main and mizzen masts off the Mull of Galloway, Ayrshire. She was taken in tow by the steamship Ailsa Craig and was beached at Ramsey. Humphrey was on a voyage from New Orleans, Louisiana, United States to Glasgow, Renfrewshire.
Isabela	United Kingdom	The ship was wrecked at Skinburness, Cumberland with the loss of all hands. She was on a voyage from Liverpool to Carlisle, Cumberland.
Jane McAskill	United Kingdom	The sloop was driven ashore and wrecked at Colvend, Kirkcudbrightshire. Her crew were rescued. She was on a voyage from Liverpool to Inverness.
Neptune	United Kingdom	The brig foundered in the Atlantic Ocean off Padstow, Cornwall.
Reine	Belgium	The ship was driven ashore at Blankenberge, West Flanders. She was on a voyage from Hull. Yorkshire, United Kingdom to Antwerp. Reine was refloated on 14 March and taken in to Ostend, West Flanders.
Sir David Milne	United Kingdom	The ship was abandoned in the North Sea. She was on a voyage from Hull to Newcastle upon Tyne, Northumberland.
Sisters	United Kingdom	The ship was driven ashore at Bridlington, Yorkshire. Her crew were rescued by the coble Sportsman (United Kingdom).
St. François	France	The ship was driven ashore and wrecked at Lowestoft.
Two Brothers	United Kingdom	The ship was driven ashore and wrecked near Dingle, County Kerry.

== 9 March ==
List of shipwrecks: 9 March 1835
Ship	State	Description
Armistead or Armistice	United Kingdom	The ship struck the pier at Great Yarmouth, Norfolk and sank. She was on a voyage from Dundee, Forfarshire to Great Yarmouth.
James	United Kingdom	The ship was driven ashore at Tranmere, Cheshire. She was on a voyage from Liverpool, Lancashire to Limerick.
Lexington	United States	The ship was driven ashore at Sandy Hook, New Jersey. She was on a voyage from Cádiz, Spain to New York.
Tyne or Tyne and Rose	United Kingdom	The ship was driven ashore and wrecked in Dunmanus Bay, County Cork.

== 10 March ==
List of shipwrecks: 10 March 1835
Ship	State	Description
Brownfield	United Kingdom	The ship was driven ashore at Ryde, Isle of Wight.
Dorothy	United Kingdom	The barque foundered in the North Sea off Whitby, Yorkshire. Her thirteen crew were rescued by the brig Echo (United Kingdom).
Happy Return	United Kingdom	The ship was wrecked on the Pan Sand, in the North Sea off the coast of Kent. She was on a voyage from Guernsey, Channel Islands to London.

== 11 March ==
List of shipwrecks: 11 March 1835
Ship	State	Description
HMS Jackdaw	Royal Navy	The schooner was wrecked on a reef off Old Providence Island.
Lise Auguste	Denmark	The ship was wrecked on Fanø. She was on a voyage from Assens to Douglas, Isle of Man.
Three Gebroeders	Bremen	The ship was driven ashore near Ringkøbing, Denmark. Her crew were rescued. She was on a voyage from Bremen to Amsterdam, North Holland, Netherlands.

== 12 March ==
List of shipwrecks: 12 March 1835
Ship	State	Description
Caledonia	United Kingdom	The ship was driven ashore in St. Mary's Bay, Isle of Man. Her crew were rescued. She was on a voyage from the Strangford Lough to Liverpool, Lancashire.
George III	United Kingdom	George III. The convict ship, a full-rigged ship was wrecked in the D'Entrecasteaux Channel with the loss of 133 of the 294 people on board.

== 14 March ==
List of shipwrecks: 14 March 1835
Ship	State	Description
Cottager	United Kingdom	The sloop foundered in the North Sea north of Whitby, Yorkshire. Her crew were rescued.
George IV	United Kingdom	The ship was driven ashore and severely damaged at Douglas, Isle of Man. She was on a voyage from Liverpool, Lancashire to São Miguel, Azores, Portugal. George IV was later refloated and taken in to Ramsey, Isle of Man.
Heroine	United Kingdom	The ship was driven ashore and wrecked in Dundrum Bay. She was on a voyage from Liverpool to New Orleans, Louisiana, United States.
Lancaster	United Kingdom	The ship struck rocks and sank in Cardigan Bay off Pwllheli, Caernarfonshire. Her crew were rescued. She was on a voyage from Liverpool to an African port.
Mary Ann	United Kingdom	The ship was lost on the Bree Bank, in the North Sea off the coast of West Flanders, Belgium. She was on a voyage from Rotterdam, South Holland, Netherlands to London.

== 15 March ==
List of shipwrecks: 15 March 1835
Ship	State	Description
Helen	United Kingdom	The ship was driven ashore and severely damaged at Rock Ferry, Cheshire. She was on a voyage from Liverpool, Lancashire to New York, United States.
Swallow	United Kingdom	The ship foundered in the English Channel 5 nautical miles (9.3 km) west of Portland Bill, Dorset. Her crew were rescued. She was on a voyage from Poole to Bridport, Dorset.

== 16 March ==
List of shipwrecks: 16 March 1835
Ship	State	Description
Hallestown or Halsetown	United Kingdom	The ship was driven ashore and wrecked on the coast of Tarragona, Spain. Her crew were rescued. She was on a voyage from Marseille, Bouches-du-Rhône to Liverpool, Lancashire.
Little Turk	(United Kingdom of Great Britain and Ireland) Antigua	The drogher was wrecked on the Belfast Reef, off Antigua.
Louisa	United Kingdom	The ship was driven ashore and wrecked at the mouth of the Ebro. She was on a voyage from Barcelona and Salem, Spain to London.
Richard	United Kingdom	The ship departed from Svinør, Norway for Liverpool, Lancashire. No further trace, presumed foundered in a gale on or after 18 March with the loss of all handas.

== 17 March ==
List of shipwrecks: 17 March 1835
Ship	State	Description
Aracabessa (or Oracabessa)	(United Kingdom of Great Britain and Ireland) Jamaica	The ship was wrecked at Jamaica.
Copernicus	United Kingdom	The ship ran aground and was wrecked in Cochin Bay. She was on a voyage from Cochin, India to London.
Hanne Caroline	Hamburg	The ship was wrecked at Flekkefjord, Norway with the loss of all but two of her crew. she was on a voyage from Odense, Denmark to London, United Kingdom.
Margaret Brown	United Kingdom	The ship ran aground on the North Bank, in Liverpool Bay and was consequently beached. She was on a voyage from Dundalk, County Louth to Liverpool, Lancashire.

== 18 March ==
List of shipwrecks: 18 March 1835
Ship	State	Description
Margaret	United Kingdom	The ship ran aground in the River Mersey at Liverpool. She was on a voyage from Dundalk, County Louth to Liverpool, Lancashire.
Sarah	United Kingdom	The ship was driven ashore and wrecked on Puffin Island, Anglesey. She was on a voyage from Liverpool to New Orleans, Louisiana, United States.

== 19 March ==
List of shipwrecks: 19 March 1835
Ship	State	Description
Friendship	United Kingdom	The ship struck rocks and sank at Jersey, Channel Islands. Her crew were rescued. She was on a voyage from Bridport, Dorset to Jersey.
Tagus	United Kingdom	The ship was wrecked on the Bird Rock. She was on a voyage from St. Jago de Cuba, Cuba to Trieste.

== 24 March ==
List of shipwrecks: 24 March 1835
Ship	State	Description
Mordecai	United States	The ship foundered in the Atlantic Ocean 50 nautical miles (93 km) south east of Barnegat, New Jersey. She was on a voyage from New York to Gibraltar.

== 26 March ==
List of shipwrecks: 26 March 1835
Ship	State	Description
Venus	United States	The ship was wrecked at Bermuda. She was on a voyage from Norfolk, Virginia to Guadeloupe.

== 27 March ==
List of shipwrecks: 27 March 1835
Ship	State	Description
Bristol Packet	United Kingdom	The ship foundered in the Bristol Channel with the loss of all hands. She was on a voyage from Bideford, Devon to Bristol, Gloucestershire.

== 28 March ==
List of shipwrecks: 28 March 1835
Ship	State	Description
Brown	United States	The ship was driven ashore and wrecked at Sandy Hook, New Jersey. She was on a voyage from Porto, Portugal to New York.
HMRC Hound	Board of Customs	The cutter was driven ashore and wrecked at Weymouth, Dorset.
HMRC Swallow	Board of Customs	The cutter was driven ashore and wrecked at Weymouth.

== 29 March ==
List of shipwrecks: 29 March 1835
Ship	State	Description
Twende Brodre	Norway	The ship foundered off Stavanger. She was on a voyage from Drammen to Leith, Lothian, United Kingdom.

== 31 March ==
List of shipwrecks: 31 March 1835
Ship	State	Description
Auld	(United Kingdom of Great Britain and Ireland) British North America	The sealer, a schooner, was lost in ice off the coast of Newfoundland. There were six survivors of her 23 crew.

== Unknown date ==
List of shipwrecks: Unknown date 1835
Ship	State	Description
Alliance	United Kingdom	The ship foundered in the North Sea off Thisted, Denmark.
Ann	United Kingdom	The ship was driven ashore at Demerara before 5 March.
Belleck Castke	United Kingdom	The ship was driven ashore in Lough Swilly. She was on a voyage from Liverpool, Lancashire to Limerick.
Blucher	United Kingdom	The ship was driven ashore at Berbice, British Guiana before 5 March. She was on a voyage from Liverpool, Lancashire to Demerara.
Caroline	United Kingdom	The ship was abandoned in the Atlantic Ocean (53°N 14°W). Her crew were rescued by Napoleon (United Kingdom). Caroline was on a voyage from Saint John, New Brunswick, British North America to Hull, Yorkshire.
Dankbarkeit	Netherlands	The ship was driven ashore and wrecked on Walcheren, Zeeland before 7 March. She was on a voyage from Java, Netherlands East Indies to Rotterdam, South Holland.
Dee	United Kingdom	The ship was wrecked on Walney Island, Lancashire.
Fanny	(United Kingdom of Great Britain and Ireland) New South Wales	The schooner was wrecked in the Manning River before 28 March.
Frederike Henriette	Hamburg	The ship was wrecked at Thisted, Denmark before 29 March. She was on a voyage from Hamburg to Hull.
Harmony	United Kingdom	The ship foundered in the Atlantic Ocean between the Isles of Scilly and the Seven Stones Reef before 19 March.
Hope	United Kingdom	The ship was lost whilat on a voyage from South Shields, County Durham to Wells-next-the-Sea, Norfolk.
James Daly	United Kingdom	The ship was driven ashore at Tranmere, Cheshire. She was on a voyage from Liverpool to Limerick.
Jean Mackaskill	United Kingdom	The ship was lost in the "Western Highlands".
Jeune Clemence	Belgium	The ship was lost whilst on a voyage from Hull, Yorkshire, United Kingdom to Antwerp.
Lady Douglas	United Kingdom	The ship was driven ashore in Tor Bay.
Louise	France	The sloop was driven ashore and wrecked at Westkapelle, Zeeland before 7 March. She was on a voyage from Vlissingen, Zeeland to Dunkirk, Nord.
Matilda	United Kingdom	The ship was driven ashore at Demerara before 5 March.
Selsey	United Kingdom	The ship was wrecked before 20 March. She was on a voyage from Goole, Yorkshire to London.
Thomas	United Kingdom	The ship was driven ashore in Holyhead Bay with the loss of five of her crew. She was on a voyage from Sierra Leone to Liverpool.
Union	United Kingdom	The ship was driven ashore and wrecked at Holyhead, Anglesey before 19 March. She was on a voyage from Wexford to Liverpool.
Union	United Kingdom	The ship was wrecked at Grenada before 28 March.
