= List of ships named Oracabessa =

Several ships have been named Oracabessa (or Aracabessa, or Orakabeza, or Oracabezza, or Orracabeza) for Oracabessa, a small town in St Mary, Jamaica.

- Orakabeza (1785 ship) (or Aracabessa in some United States sources), was a West Indiaman launched at Hull. A French privateer captured and burnt Orakabeza within the bar of Charleston Harbor, in violation of the United States's neutrality.
- Oracabessa (1810 ship) was launched at Hull. In May 1823 she foundered on the Long Sand in a hurricane in the Bay of Bengal while on the way to Mauritius.
- Oracabessa was reported on 17 March 1835 to have wrecked at Hope Bay, Jamaica.
- Oracabessa was launched in 1894 as Carlisle City by Wm Doxford, Sunderland, for Furness Withy & Co. Fyffes Line purchased her in 1902 to use as a banana boat. She was of 3,002 tons (GRT). After a sequence of owners and some changes of name she was scrapped in 1932.
