= Pan Head =

- Born: Anthony Johnson; October 28, 1966
- Origin: Saint Mary Parish, Jamaica
- Died: October 10, 1993 (aged 26)
- Genres: Reggae
- Occupation: Recording Artiste
- Instrument: Vocals
- Years active: 1980s–1993

Pan Head (born Anthony Johnson on October 28, 1966 in Islington, Saint Mary Parish, Jamaica, died October 10, 1993, Marverly, St. Andrew) was a reggae/dancehall deejay.

== Biography ==
Pan Head emerged in 1985, and after working for several years with the Love Vibration and Scorpio sound systems, he released his first single, "Gimme Lickle Lovin'" in 1988. Early releases such as "Respect Gunman", "Punny Printer", and "Gunman Tune" were immediately popular in Jamaica. As his popularity grew, he performed with the likes of Buju Banton, Beenie Man, and Capleton. Although he was predicted to be a major star, his career was cut short when he was shot dead by 3 gunmen as he and his 2 other friends left a dance in Spanish Town in October 1993, leaving a widow and two children. The crime has never been solved.

Pan Head's death shocked the music community in Kingston, and prompted several performers to record tributes; Capleton recorded "Cold Blooded Murderer", Buju Banton released the single "Murderer", and Beenie Man and Luciano collaborated on "No Mama No Cry", which went to number one in Jamaica in 1994.

== Albums ==
- Punny Printer: By Far (1994) VP
- Tribute to Pan Head (1995) Imp
