= Richard Von White =

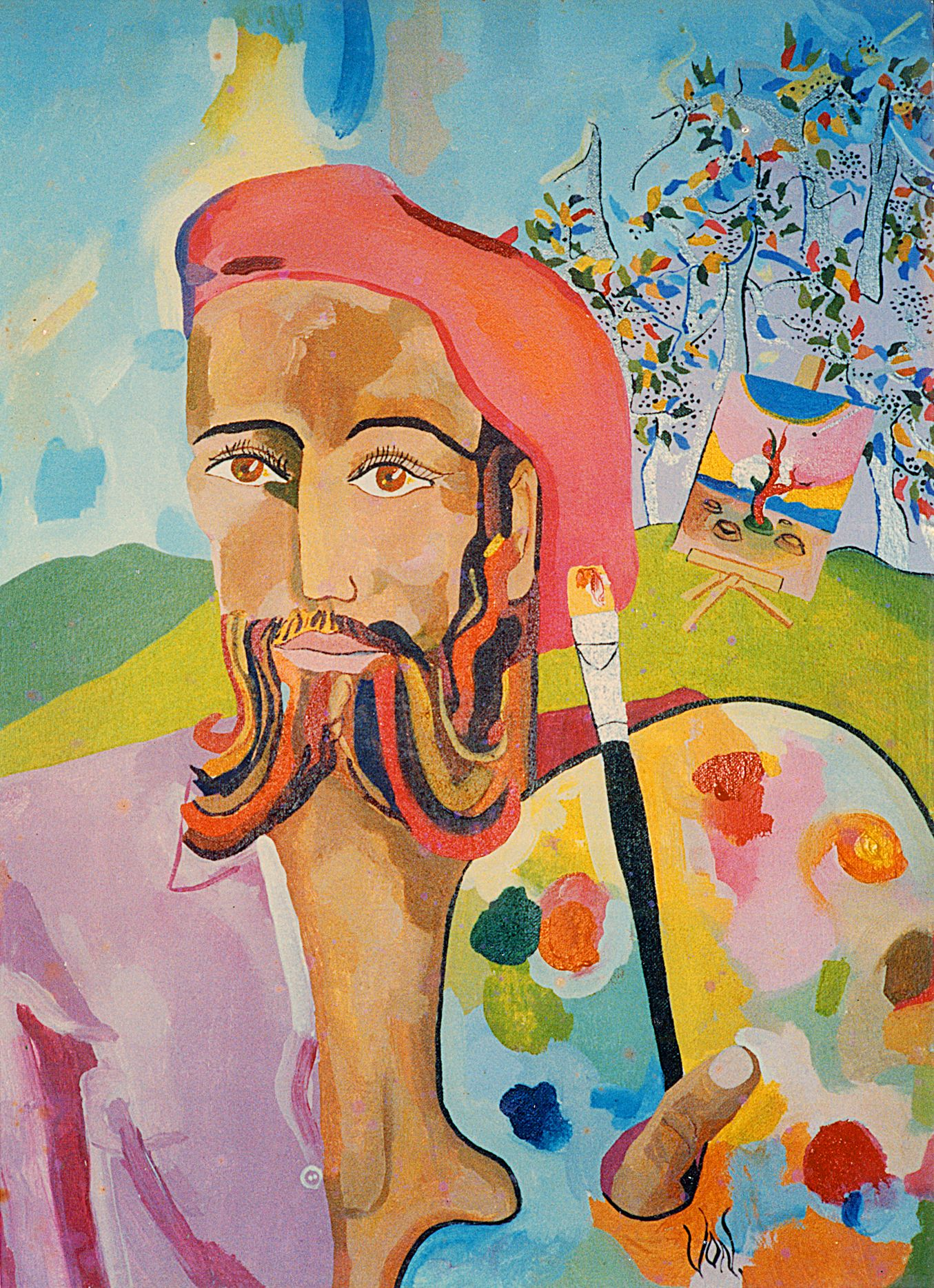
- Self-portrait of Von
- Born: Richard Elis Blair White; 24 August 1951 (age 74)
- Education: Goldsmiths College of Art in London
- Known for: Painter, printmaker, draftsman, illustrator, poet
- Movement: Modern art, modern painters

Richard "Von" White is a British abstract expressionist artist. Born Richard Elis Blair White, on the island of Jamaica in 1951, to a family of prominent businessmen and founders of the town Oracabessa. "Von" is the stage name of Richard White, an artist who specialises in pastel tropical scenes inspired by nature and the female form.

Richard "Von" White studied at the Jamaica College of Art, then went on to study at Goldsmiths College of Art in London, under the tutelage of Professor Harry Thubron. Graduating with honours from Goldsmiths, Von went on to develop his own style of abstraction, with a keystone on the masters that have gone before – particularly Pablo Picasso, Paul Gauguin and Georgia O'Keeffe.

Von's philosophy on art finds its roots in Taoism. He expanded on many of his early ideas on art in an academic thesis based on creativity and its relationship with Taoism of Laozi. Von's themes are an approach to abstract expressionism as embodied by the Tao. Von is of the Christian faith.

Von's paintings have been said to have a prevailing message of tranquility.

Von's art also finds great inspiration from the rock and roll era of the 1960s and 1970s.

== Biography ==
Richard "Von" White was born in Kingston, Jamaica on 24 August 1951 at Nuttall Hospital just after Jamaica had been devastated by Hurricane Charlie (1951). All telecommunications were downed due to the hurricane, so his birth (among others) was announced on the national radio to get messages of births and deaths to respective families islandwide. He began painting and drawing from an early age of 3 years old. Von Grew up in Oracabessa, and attended Oracbessa Primary as a youth, and then at eight years old went to dèCarteret College in Mandeville where he completed his secondary education with a primary focus on the visual arts, finishing with A level Art and A level English Literature. Following this Von attended the Edna Manley College of the Visual and Performing Arts (formally Jamaica School of Art) in 1970, where he was tutored by professor Harry Thubron who was contracted to work with Jamaica School of Art at that time. Following this Von travelled to London to do a foundation course with Hammersmith College of Art/Chelsea School of Art, Kings Road London. He then applied to Goldsmiths College London where he was accepted to complete a Bachelor of Fine Arts, and again under Professor Harry Thubron tutelage he graduated First Division honours in 1977. Upon return to Jamaica in 1978, Von has had several exhibitions throughout the decades. These are listed below. This artist has devoted a lifetime to the development of his style of art and produced many works of art. His work is owned by people worldwide, with original paintings in locations from Australia to the far east, and from Europe to North America.

== Von's Art - From a philosophical background ==
=== The Tao ===
Von is an artist who is a Jamaican that studied art in London England and found inspiration from the Sage Laozi from ancient China. "The utility of the empty bowl is the space within". Laozi, a possibly mythological figure reputed to have lived around the time of Confucius, is said to have been keeper of the imperial archives at Luoyang in the province of Henan in the 6th century B.C. All his life Laozi taught that "The Tao that can be told is not the eternal Tao"; but, according to ancient legend, as he was riding off into the desert to die - sick at heart at the ways of men - he was persuaded by a gatekeeper in northwestern China to write down his teaching for posterity. This book is called the Tao Te Ching.

The essence of Taoism is contained in the eighty-one chapters of the book- roughly 5,000 words- which have for 2,500 years provided one of the major underlying influences in Chinese thought and culture, emerging also in proverbs and folklore. Whereas Confucianism is concerned with day-to-day rules of conduct, Taoism is concerned with a more spiritual level of being.

Poem ONE

The Tao that can be told is not the eternal Tao. The name that can be named is not the eternal name. The nameless is the beginning of heaven and earth. The named is the mother of ten thousand things. Ever desireless, one can see the mystery. Ever desiring, one can see the manifestations. These two spring from the same source but differ in name; this appears as darkness. Darkness within Darkness. The gate to all mystery.

The goal of an artist is to create art, to be creative. As the Taoist see it: Only Tao, mother of all things, is invisible and unfathomable, but it is through her manifestations, nevertheless, that all things are created. Alfred North Whitehead expressed his central concept thus: "In the philosophy of organism this ultimate is termed 'creativity' and God is its primordial, non-temporal accident." The Taoist, says that this ultimate is creativity, that creativity is Tao. Since Tao is inexpressible, explaining it in terms of the process of creativity is merely resorting to a verbal convenience, or, more precisely, a verbal inconvenience. Laozi, of course, faced the same difficulty. In one place he turns to the use of numbers in attempting to describe the process of creativity. But his use of numbers is entirely without conventional meaning. In Chapter 42 of the Tao Te Ching we read:

Poem Forty Two

From the Tao, the One is created; From the One, Two; From the Two, Three; From the Three, Ten Thousand Things.

The numbers as used here are simply intended to suggest the need for an intuitive awareness of the process of differentiation from nondifferentiation, the realization that the multiple diversities of existence emanate from the unity of the absolute realm of Tao. The numbers symbolize what our intellect is unable to explain. The same thing is true of the word process as is used here to try to explain it. Here obliged to resort to such a word in attempting to explain Tao intellectually. Actual creativity requires no intellectual explanation in terms of process. It is, rather, a mere intuitive reflection of things

Von the artist and student of the Tao in his academic thesis explored a subtle comparison of Taoist views and picture making. The first chapters had not dealt with any given technique or style of painting. As is reviewed in the next section (On The Masters). For it is his view that different styles of expression are merely different directions or roads leading to the same light or oneness. As an artist and a poet Von appreciated Laozi's views. Taking into consideration the idea that the artist's mind is the ultimate mirror. For he is the individual who is capable of reflecting the here and now of creation literally onto canvas.

=== On the masters ===
The style of art found in paintings by Von is primarily influenced by three masters. Pablo Picasso, Paul Gauguin and Georgia O'Keeffe. This is seen through a strong relationship with some aspects of the styles of these three masters of the visual arts. In Von's work there is a similarity in the flat shapes, hard-edged colours of Pablo Picasso, as well as a similarity in the inventiveness of their abstraction. There are also similarities in Pablo Picasso's distortions of female body in some of his work with some of Von's work.

It was said that when Paul Gauguin first went to Tahiti he was amazed at the colours he was painting with, so much brighter due to the strong tropical light as opposed to France where he was formerly. The tropical light and bright colours are also a strong feature of the works of Von. Beautiful women are likewise an inspiration to Von and the study of the female form.

Georgia O'Keeffe shows an open spatial awareness, and positive link with nature and her surroundings. This can be attributed to the time she spent living in New Mexico. This connection to nature and open spatial arrangement of work can be seen in Von's work as he has also been influenced by O'Keeffe.

Von was born on an island and has interpreted everything in his own way from the time of the impressionists to the present, and invented his own style of painting trying to break new ground and be original in his own way. This style is termed tropical modernism i.e. von Tropic Mod.

=== Von's philosophy ===
"The Tao is Elusive and Intangible. Oh it is intangible and Elusive, and yet within is image. Oh elusive and intangible and yet within is form. Oh it is dim and dark and yet within is essence." Laozi finally says "thus I perceive the creation." This verse encompasses that mystic unity of the physical and the metaphysical. The verse suggests that link with space and what is within the space if they complement each other. Just as how light complements darkness, some given thing, a source of material therefore an image complements nothing or emptiness, a void. To narrow this aspect of thought let us suggest that this material is our world complementary to outer space which it is within.

Now the terms nature and super nature include everything which has already been reckoned with. Through the study of our visible surroundings, Cezanne came to the conclusion that everything is based on the sphere, the cone and the cylinder. In this statement he did not include the cube which literally means a box, for nothing in nature is constructed from a box. Except perhaps a few seascape cliffs in remote paths for example the Giant's Causeway in Ireland. The cube or the box is a man made form and Cezanne was the first to introduce a slanting of basically rectangular patches of colour in various directions achieving three dimensional solidity and depth. This style of painting he used in landscape breaking up a natural environment. A good example is his paintings on Mont Sainte-Victoire. Sure this was a revolutionary way in seeing and out of it later came cubism, with father of modern art Picasso and Braque. They took this to its ultimate, including African sculpture as inspiration; but the cube or the box is a man-made form totally alien to natural construction unlike the sphere cone and cylinder.

In Western society and civilisation i.e. the "western tradition", the cities are often defined by straight lines and boxes. This trend has even furthered through the influence of Cubism on modern architecture. This infinity of boxes within boxes, a rigid geometry that stands in stark contrast to the organic forms of many indigenous African and Native American cultures, such as the adobe structures of New Mexico. A shape which some African and American Indian tribes to the day could not accept. Some of their buildings are the adobes of New Mexico. This box-like shape was also largely absent in the splendid Eastern and Middle Eastern architecture. Von has been inspired by ancient Chinese Taoist teachings, which advocate for staying centered within oneself, while remaining deeply connected to nature. This philosophy the physical world to reach a "super nature", finding a mysthical and metaphysical unity between the soul and the environment. In other words, encompassing the mystic unity between the mystical and the metaphysical.

"Oh it is elusive and intangible and yet within is image and form."

== Artwork ==
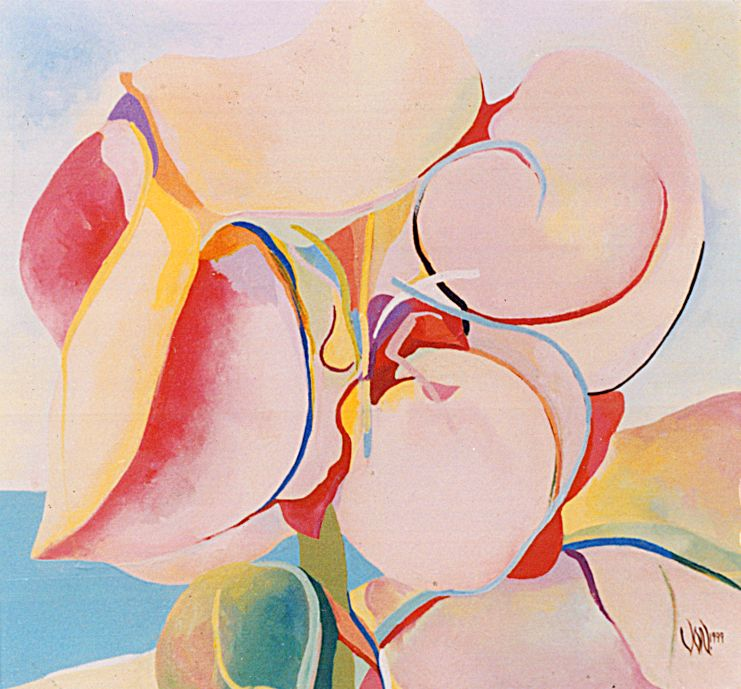
New Age English Rose 1999

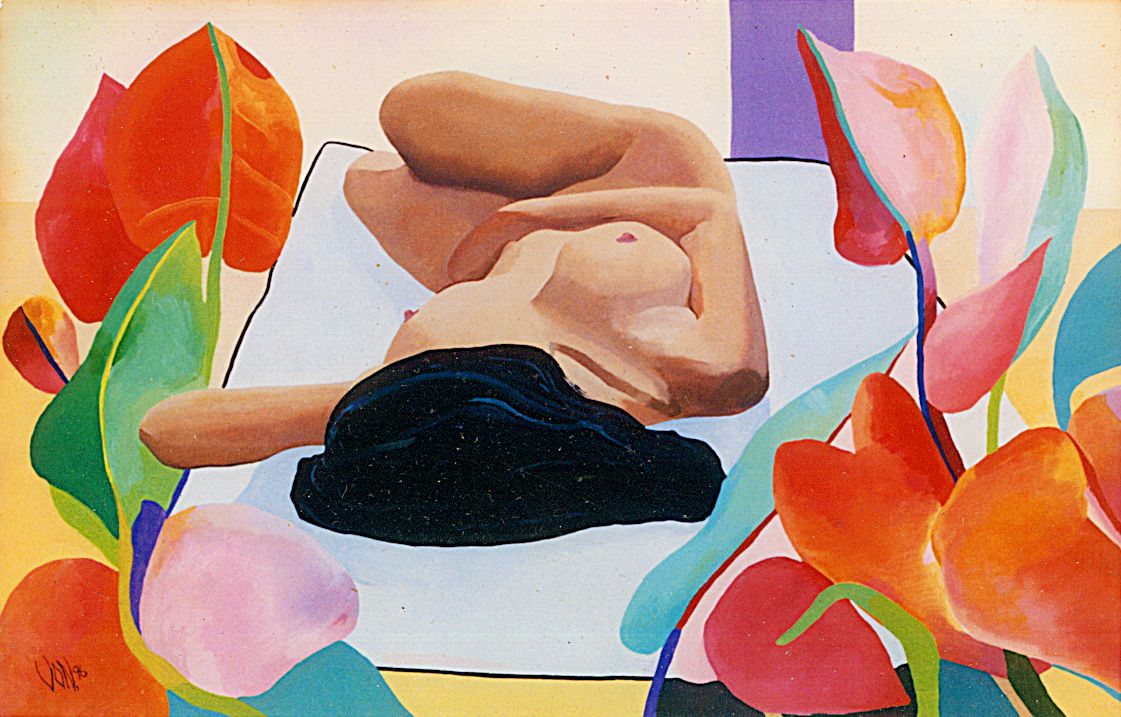
Eve of Tahiti 1996

== Exhibitions ==
=== Solo exhibitions ===
1977 Olympia Arts Centre, Kingston, Jamaica 1979 Bolivar Gallery, Kingston, Jamaica 1981 Diplomat Gallery, Kingston, Jamaica 1982 Harmony Hall, Ocho Rios, Jamaica 1983 Mutual Life Gallery, Kingston, Jamaica 1987 Gallery Makonde, Wyndham Hotel, Kingston, Jamaica 1998 New Mutual Life Gallery, Kingston, Jamaica 2004 Grosvenor Gallery, Kingston, Jamaica

=== Group exhibitions ===
1978 Tom Redcam Library, Kingston, Jamaica 1974 London Hilton, England (In Honour of Lord Pitt) 1978–present Annual National Exhibition, National Gallery of Jamaica
