= Operation Goldeneye =

Allied stay-behind plan in Spain during WWII

Operation Goldeneye was an Allied stay-behind plan during the Second World War to monitor Spain after a possible alliance between Francisco Franco and the Axis powers, and to undertake sabotage operations. The plan was formed by Commander Ian Fleming of the Naval Intelligence Division (NID). No German takeover of Spain took place, nor an invasion of Gibraltar, and the plan was shelved in 1943. Fleming later used the name for his Jamaican home where he wrote the James Bond stories.

== Background ==
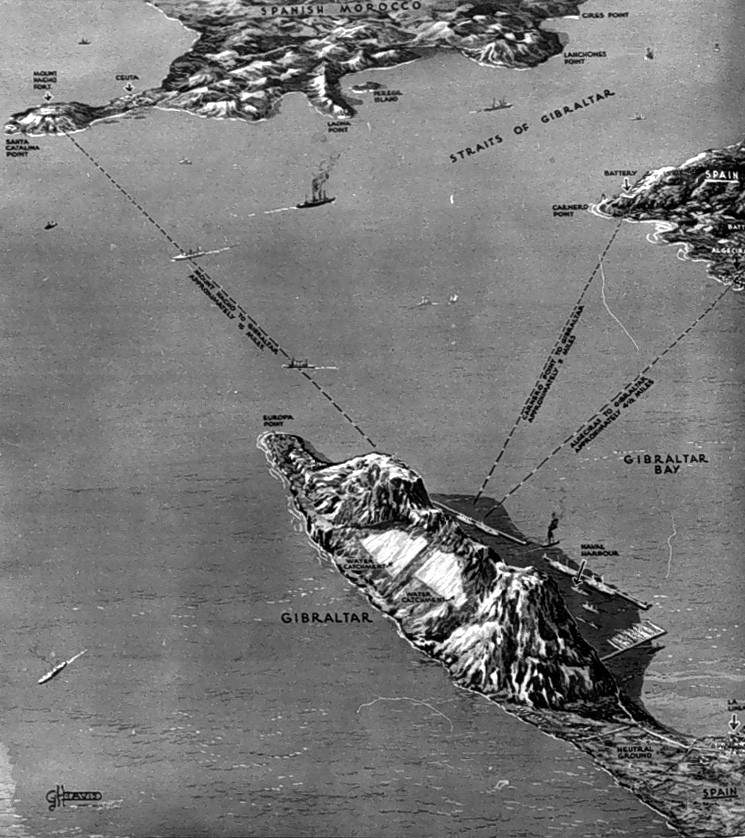
1939 map of the Strait of Gibraltar from The Illustrated London News

The aim of the operation was to ensure that Britain could continue to communicate with Gibraltar if Spain joined, or was invaded by, the Axis powers, and to carry out limited sabotage. In August 1940, Lieutenant Commander Ian Fleming of the NID was assigned the responsibility for drawing up the plan. Of particular concern to Fleming was the possible installation of Axis radar equipment and infrared cameras in the Strait of Gibraltar, which would have been a threat to the Navy's Mediterranean strategy and to Allied shipping interests in the Atlantic Ocean.

Under cover of a courier's passport, Fleming travelled to Gibraltar on 16 February 1941. On his arrival, he liaised closely with Alan Hillgarth, the British naval attaché in Madrid. Hillgarth provided much of the background to the plan for the guerrilla campaign and sabotage that would follow German presence on the Iberian peninsula. (Note: The sabotage was to have been carried out by Section H of the Special Operations Executive.) Fleming's presence in Gibraltar was primarily to set up a secure cipher link between London and the Goldeneye liaison office, the latter under the control of H. L. Greensleeves, an NID agent. A Tangier office was also set up by Fleming to assume the activities of the Gibraltar office should the Germans occupy Gibraltar. During the course of his visit, Fleming also met with William J. Donovan from the American Office of Strategic Services, who was on a fact-finding tour. Fleming returned to London on 26 February 1941.

A precursor to visiting the United States, Fleming discussed Goldeneye with the various intelligence organisations in Lisbon on 20 May 1941 to ensure their smooth coordinated operations. He also undertook an assessment of the facilities and equipment for Goldeneye. He suggested that an Anglo-American Intelligence Committee be set up to coordinate the gathering and evaluating of intelligence from North Africa and the Iberian peninsula.

In 1942 Goldeneye moved into a state of alert prior to the implementation of Operation Torch, the Allied invasion of North Africa, to monitor and counter the stepped up surveillance and sabotage activities by the Axis powers who suspected that some type of military action would occur in the Mediterranean area. The 10th Light Flotilla, an elite unit of Italian navy frogmen, would use wrecked ships in Gibraltar to launch attacks on Allied shipping. (Note: The frogmen used the below-the-waterline trapdoor of an Italian tanker to avoid detection, a scenario Fleming later used in his novel Thunderball.)

The reduced risk of Nazi occupation of Spain brought about the shutdown of Goldeneye in August 1943, along with the associated plan, Operation Tracer.

== Post-war legacy ==
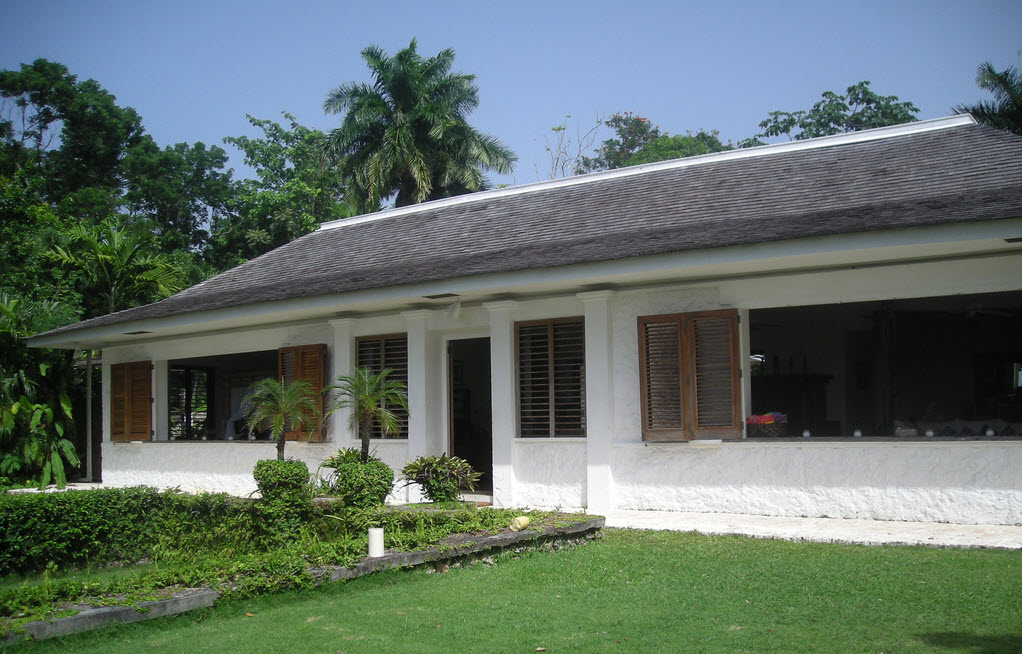
Fleming's Goldeneye estate, where he wrote all the Bond novels

Fleming later named his Jamaican estate "Goldeneye", and began writing his series of James Bond novels there. The name was also used for the title of the seventeenth James Bond film, GoldenEye starring Pierce Brosnan as Bond.

== Notes and references ==
Notes

== Bibliography ==
- Bennett, Tony; Woollacott, Janet (2003). "The Moments of Bond". In Lindner, Christoph (ed.). The James Bond Phenomenon: A Critical Reader. Manchester: Manchester University Press. ISBN 978-0-7190-6541-5.
- Cabell, Craig (2008). Ian Fleming's Secret War. Barnsley: Pen and Sword Books. ISBN 978-1-84415-773-0.
- Haining, Peter (2007). The Mystery of Rommel's Gold: The Search of the Legendary Nazi Treasure. London: Anova Books. ISBN 978-1-84486-053-1.
- Hart-Davis, Duff (2012). Man of War. London: Random House. ISBN 978-1-84605-971-1.
- Lochery, Neill (2011). Lisbon: War in the Shadows of the City of Light, 1939–1945. New York: PublicAffairs. ISBN 978-1-58648-879-6.
- Lycett, Andrew (1996). Ian Fleming. London: Phoenix. ISBN 978-1-85799-783-5.
- Macintyre, Ben (2008). For Your Eyes Only. London: Bloomsbury Publishing. ISBN 978-0-7475-9527-4.
- Macintyre, Ben (2010). Operation Mincemeat: The True Spy Story That Changed the Course of World War II. London: Bloomsbury Publishing. ISBN 978-1-4088-0921-1.
