= Fort Haldane =

Fortress in Jamaica

- Port Maria, St. Mary, Jamaica

Site information
- Owner: Government of Jamaica
- Open to the public: Yes

Location
- Coordinates: 18.3833°N 76.9°W

Site history
- Built: September 1759
- In use: No
- Materials: Granite

Fort Haldane is a fortress located near Port Maria in the parish of St Mary, Jamaica and was erected in 1759. It was named after General George Haldane, then Governor of Jamaica. The fort was constructed to protect the harbour of Port Maria from Spanish raids. It was also used as a garrison to keep the enslaved and working classes of St. Mary under control.

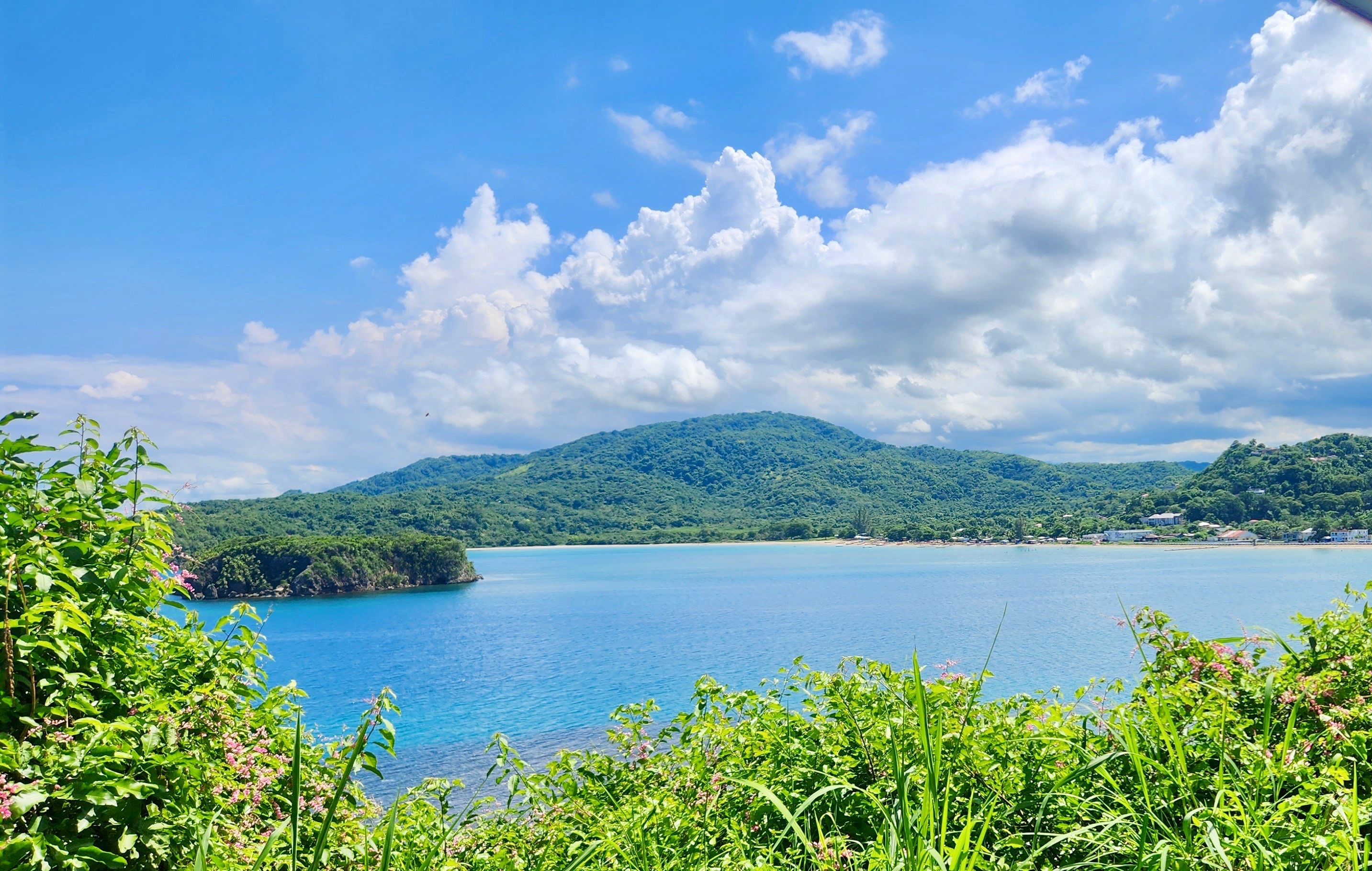
Cabarita Island and Paggee beach, St.Mary Parish

The guns of the fort are strategically positioned on a hill facing seaward, which gives a wide view of the old shipping port of Port Maria. The fort is located next to Firefly Estate, the original home of Sir Henry Morgan, and later, Sir Noël Coward. Morgan had realized the strategic military advantage of the land and used it as an observation outpost more than 150 years prior to the construction of the fort.

== History ==
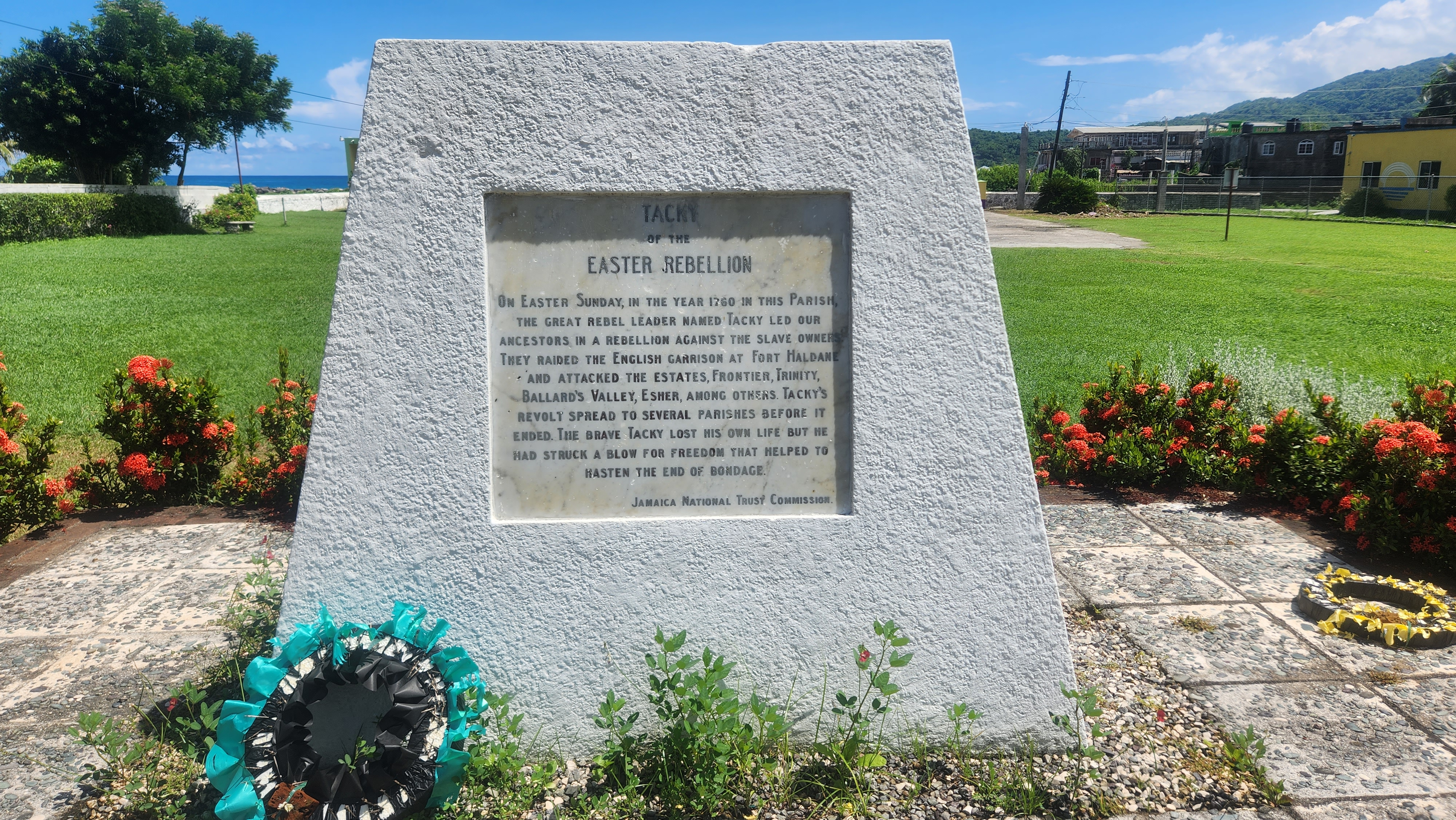
Tacky's Rebellion

Fort Haldane served a pivotal role in Tacky's rebellion, one of Jamaica's bloodiest rebellions against slavery in 1760. On Easter Sunday, a runaway slave known as Tacky and a small group of slaves from neighboring plantations murdered their masters and marched to Port Maria where they killed the guards at Fort Haldane and stole several barrels of gunpowder and firearms. They fought alongside hundreds of other slaves and Maroons for five months. Their rebellion was ultimately quashed by the colonial government and the death of Tacky in a fierce firefight.

The fort was in active service from 1759 until 1780 when a hurricane destroyed the storerooms, barracks, and main garrison building. By 1780, the threat of Spanish attack on the North Coast of the island had largely waned, and the decision was made to abandon the fort and relocate the garrison to nearby Ocho Rios.

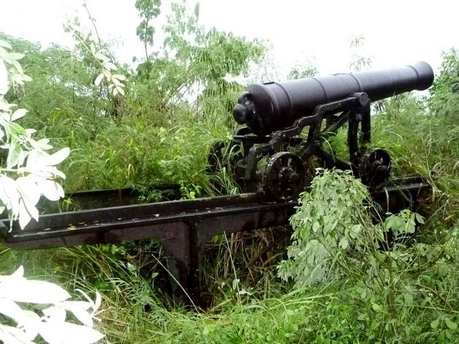
One of the cannons at Fort Haldane.

Governor Haldane was actively involved in the design of the fort. As a highly decorated veteran of many major field battles, Haldane was an expert in artillery and ballistics. Haldane was friends with noted English scientist Benjamin Robins, and he enlisted Robins to help with the gunnery placements for the fort.

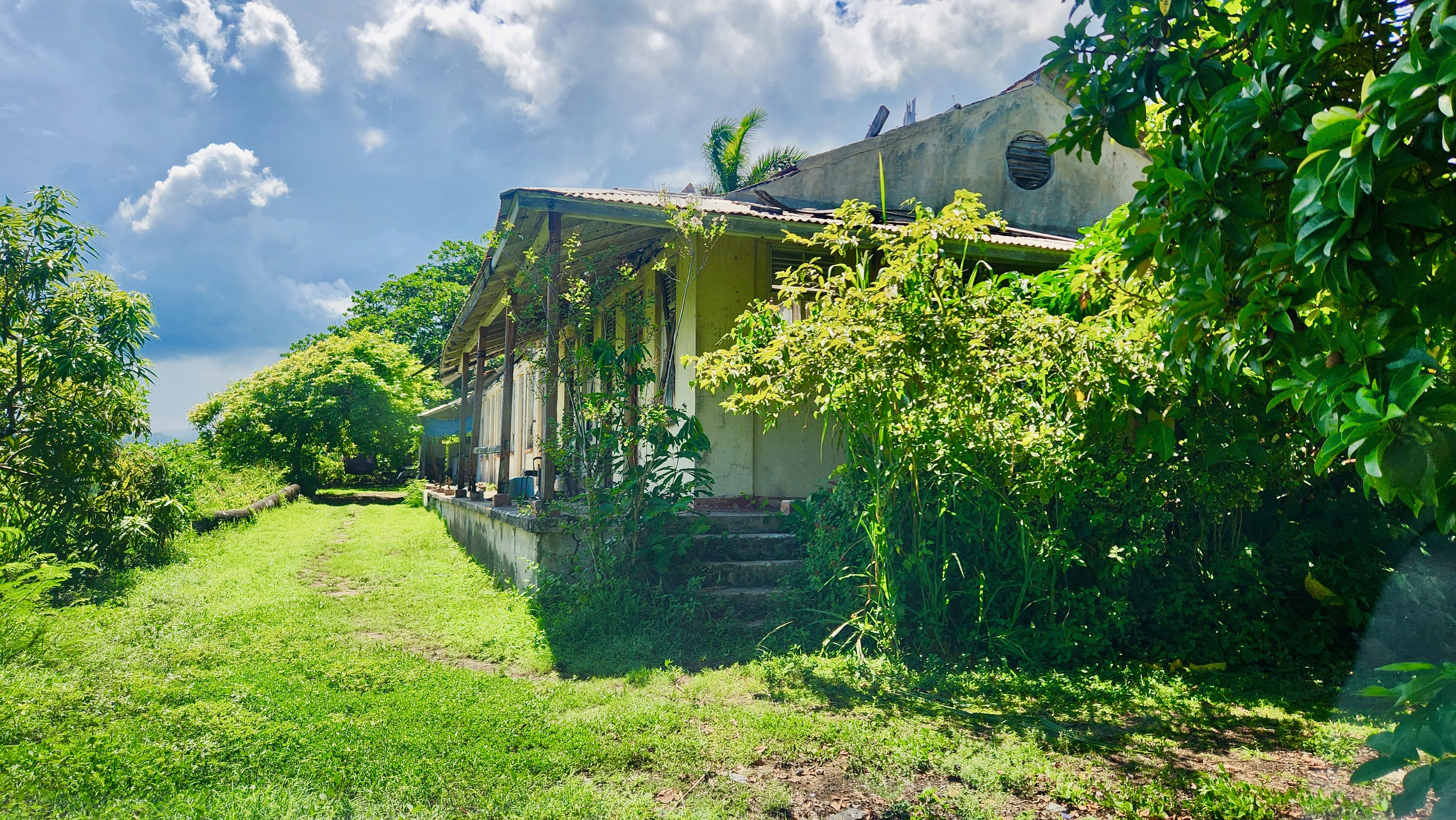
QuartersFortHaldane 20231007 123542

Robin's applied his scientific approach to ballistics, and determined that the entire port could be successfully defended by the use of two high-accuracy cannons placed 1,000 ft above sea level.

The guns that would be required would have a precision that was unprecedented at the time. The cannon carriages were mounted on turntables to permit side-to-side aiming, and a track to allow for cannon recoil. The turntable was a small version of the locomotive turntables that were used by railroad companies to reverse engines or move them from one track to another. The ability to move the cannons almost 180 degrees across the horizon eliminated the need for a multi-cannon arsenal, while providing the highest degree of protection from enemy attack.

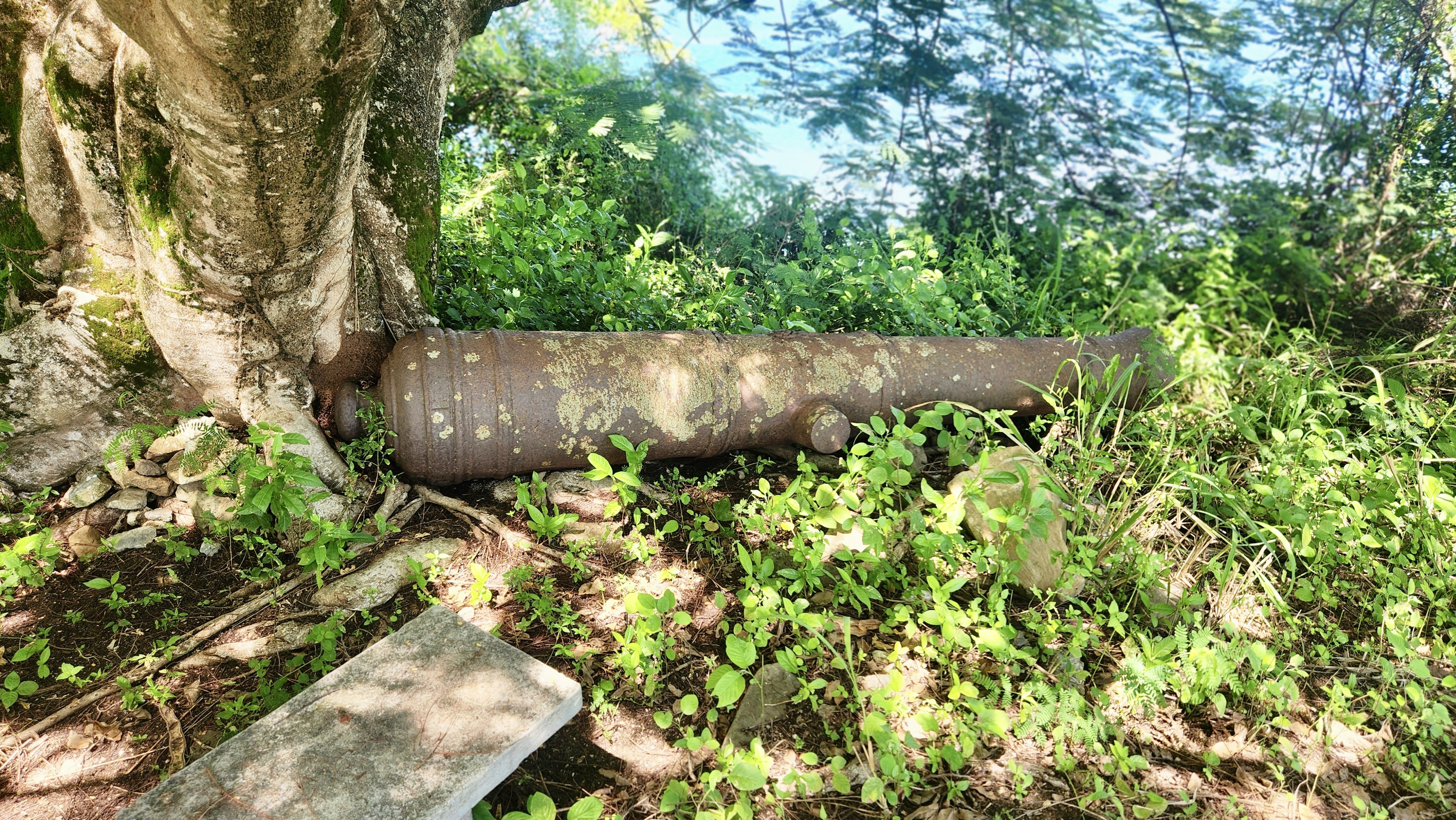
Cannon resting on a tree root

The two cannons and the ruins of several outbuildings are all that remains of Fort Haldane today.
