= Golden Clouds =

Building in Oracabessa, Jamaica

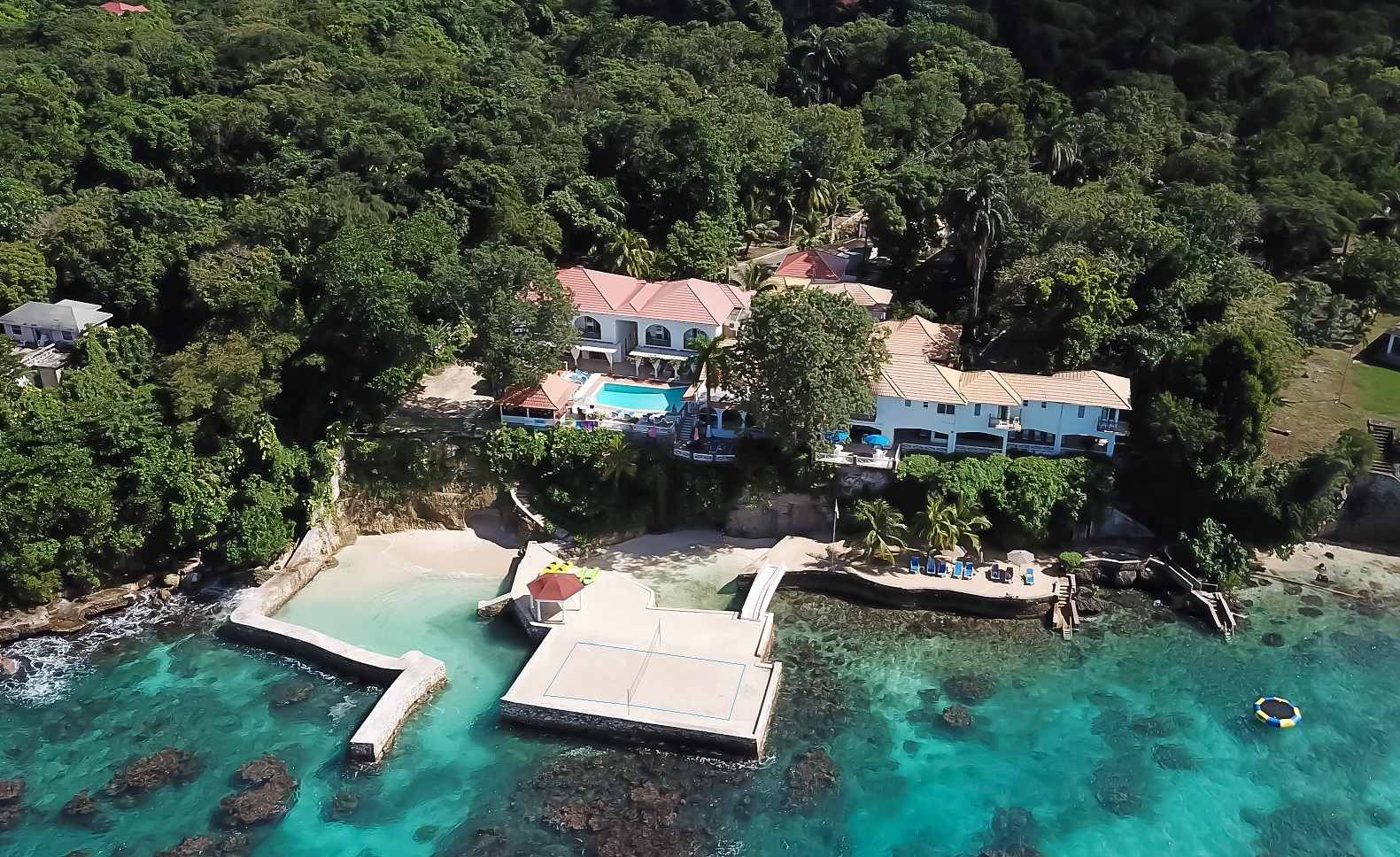
- Aerial photo of Golden Clouds

- Location within Jamaica

General information
- Location: Oracabessa, Jamaica
- Coordinates: 18.412503°N 76.9410646°W
- Owner: Colin Simpson, Oksana Simpson
- Management: Golden Clouds

Other information
- Number of suites: 12
- Parking: yes

Website
- goldenclouds.com

Golden Clouds was the name given by Ruth Bryan Owen, the first female US ambassador, to her house in Oracabessa, Jamaica. It is situated between Goldeneye, where Ian Fleming wrote many of the James Bond novels, and Noël Coward's Firefly Estate. The ocean front 15-bedroom estate is on 7 acres (2.8 ha) of manicured lawn and gardens with over 500 feet (150 m) of shoreline and its own private beach.

== History ==
Ambassador Owen purchased the property in 1911 from Chris Blackwell's grandfather, Percy Lindo, whose family owned the J. Wray and Nephew Ltd. distillery along with several thousand acres of real estate in the Oracabessa area. Owen oversaw the construction of the luxurious villa and entertained many famous guests there including Clark Gable, Carole Lombard, and Charlie Chaplin.

During the 1970s the estate was sold to Mr. and Mrs. Keeson, who restored the property. The Keesons began renting the villa to the public, and over the years the clientele has included a number of celebrities such as musicians Willie Nelson and Jimmy Buffett, and film stars Denzel Washington and Robert De Niro. The villa has also hosted many weddings and is consistently ranked as one of the top Caribbean wedding destinations.

In addition to being a popular wedding location, Golden Clouds has also served as a movie location and was featured in the film The Mighty Quinn, starring Denzel Washington, Robert Townsend, and Mimi Rogers. Golden Clouds has also been featured on several television shows including Lifestyles of the Rich and Famous, and as a grand prize on The Price Is Right.

In 2009, Golden Clouds was purchased by bestselling author and musician Colin Simpson and his wife, Oksana. Colin Simpson is the great-great-grandson of renowned slavery abolitionist James Phillippo who built the first church in the area and helped establish Oracabessa as one of Jamaica's first Free Villages. The Simpsons were married at Golden Clouds in 2001, and in an interview with The Jamaican Observer, the new owners indicated their intention to carry on the century-old tradition of luxurious accommodations and casual elegance that has made the villa world-renowned.

=== Famous clientele ===
One of Golden Cloud's most famous early guests was Charlie Chaplin, who was a good friend of original owner, Ruth Bryan Owen.

== Architecture ==
Golden Cloud's neoclassical architectural design was based on Casa Figueras, an 18th-century luxury villa that Owen stayed at during her first trip to Spain, and reflects Oracabessa's heritage as a Spanish settlement. In 1996, Golden Clouds received the Governor General's Award from the Jamaica Institute of Architects for its design, which combines historical elements with modern amenities.

== Sanctuary and attractions ==
Golden Clouds is located in the Oracabessa Bay Fish Sanctuary, which was established in 2010 to protect Oracabessa's marine ecosystem. Through investments by the Oracabessa Foundation, Seacology, and GEF, the Fish Sanctuary has reintroduced sea turtles and thousands of new coral into the Oracabessa Bay area. An important part of the Fish Sanctuary is the Oracabessa Bay Turtle project. The Turtle project monitors the beaches in Oracabessa Bay, and in 2012 they helped the release of more than 16,000 hatchlings from their nests.

The reef located directly in front of Golden Clouds is one of the largest in Oracabessa Bay.

== See also ==
- List of hotels in Jamaica
