= Oracabessa Bay Fish Sanctuary =

Protected area in Jamaica

- Oracabessa Bay Fish Sanctuary
- Location: Oracabessa, Jamaica
- Coordinates: 18.403214°N 76.94659°W

The Oracabessa Bay Fish Sanctuary was established in 2010 to protect Oracabessa's marine ecosystem. Its mission is to increase biodiversity in Oracabessa Bay to improve livelihoods in the local community. Through investments by the Oracabessa Foundation, Seacology, and GEF, the Fish Sanctuary has reintroduced Sea turtles and thousands of new coral into the Oracabessa Bay area. There are several reefs located in the Oracabessa Bay Fish Sanctuary as well as mangroves and beaches including James Bond Beach. The Golden Clouds reef is one of the largest in Oracabessa Bay and is a popular dive destination due to its diverse reef structure, vibrant marine life and close proximity to the Cayman Trough.

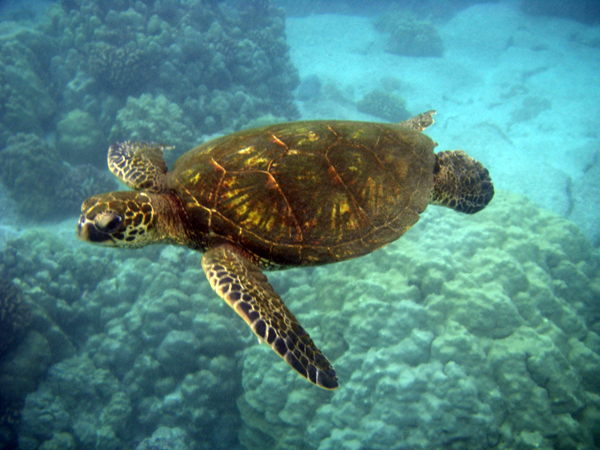
Sea Turtle in Oracabessa Bay Fish Sanctuary

Oracabessa has a long history as a Jamaican fishing village, with Oracabessa Bay at the heart of this activity. Oracabessa Bay comprises a rich ecosystem, home to a variety of habitats including coral reefs and mangroves with plentiful estuarine areas providing nursery habitat for a wide range of marine life. Concerned for the bay's long-term health, a local group called the Oracabessa Foundation succeeded in getting the bay declared an officially protected fish sanctuary.

The northern boundary of the Oracabessa Bay Fish Sanctuary is located on the edge of the Cayman Trough with walls that begin at 18 metres (60 ft). and drop down to over 46 metres (150 ft). These walls are covered in a large variety of hard and soft corals. Beautiful elephant-ear, basket, tube, and rope sponge are found on the edge of this trench with shades of red, pink, yellow, and orange colors as well as enormous trees of black coral and gorgonia. The walls contain many overhangs and ledges and are home to lobsters, king crab, green and spotted moray eels, and a host of other marine creatures. Beyond the boundaries of the Fish Sanctuary, the Cayman Trough plunges to depths of over 7,620 metres (25,000 ft) and is renowned for deep-water sport fishing including marlin and tuna.

In 2010, the Fish Sanctuary launched the Oracabessa Bay Sea Turtle Project, which monitors and protects critically endangered hawksbill sea turtles on the Oracabessa Bay beach and in the area. Due to the success of the project, over 100 nests and 16,000 hatchlings are now recorded each year. Visitors to "Turtle" beach can witness a nest release, where turtles are unleashed from the nest at a time which maximizes the percentage of eggs that hatch and reach the sea. When one of the Fish Sanctuary wardens carefully releases the nest, visitors witness the hatchlings dash for the sea and the number of turtles surviving is greatly increased with predators such as birds and crabs prevented from attacking the hatchlings.

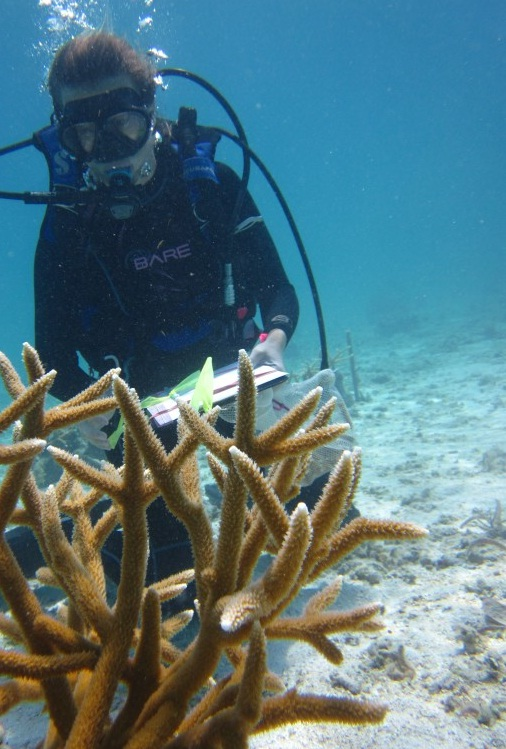
Staghorn Coral Cultivation

In 2012, the Oracabessa Bay Fish Sanctuary launched its Coral Propagation Project through the support of the Global Environment Facility Small Grants Program. The intent of this project is to propagate 2,000 individual pieces of Staghorn coral and out-plant them within the Bay's reefs through coral gardening. The process known as coral gardening consists of collecting coral biomass, usually by breaking off fragments, growing fragments in a nursery, and out-planting the reared corals on reefs. The Coral Propagation Project is intended to not only restore the thicket of Staghorn coral to its historical state on the reefs, which increases the health of the reef and provides needed habitat for fish, it is also retraining former local fishermen as coral gardeners, and providing gainful skills and steady employment opportunities for them.
