= George Haldane =

Brigadier-General George Haldane
- Born: July 1722
- Died: 26 July 1759 (aged 36–37) Jamaica

Brigadier-General George Haldane (July 1722 – 26 July 1759) was a British Army officer, politician and colonial administrator who served as the governor of Jamaica from 1756 to 1759. His father Patrick Haldane was a lawyer and politician, and his uncle Mungo Haldane was also a politician. Former Labour Party leader Jeremy Corbyn is one of his descendents.

== Life ==
He joined the British Army at the age of 17 and rose to the rank of brigadier-general after leading a series of successful military campaigns as a junior officer. He also served as Governor of Jamaica from 1756 until his death on 26 July 1759 at the age of 37.

Haldane fought in the Battle of Fontenoy in 1743, where he was wounded. He fought in the Battle of Dettingen in 1743 and he also fought in the Jacobite rising of 1745. He gained the rank of brigadier-general while serving in the 3rd Regiment of Foot Guards, and fought in the Battle of Lauffeld in 1747. His final battle was the Battle of Roucoux in 1747. After resigning his military command, Haldane held the office of Member of Parliament (M.P.) for Stirling Burghs between 1747 and 1756.

In 1759 he was appointed to the office of Governor of Jamaica. He was welcomed to the island in a poem, "An Ode to George Haldane," by Francis Williams, who went on to become one of Jamaica's most famous early writers and scholars. He died of an illness less than four months after his arrival in Jamaica.

In 1759, Fort Haldane was named in his honour and a statue erected in Port Maria, Jamaica.

Parliament of Great Britain
Preceded by James Erskine, Lord Grange	Member of Parliament for Stirling Burghs; 1747–1756	Succeeded by Robert Haldane
Government offices
Preceded by Henry Moore	Governor of Jamaica; 1756–1759	Succeeded by Henry Moore
