= James Bond Beach =

- Beach
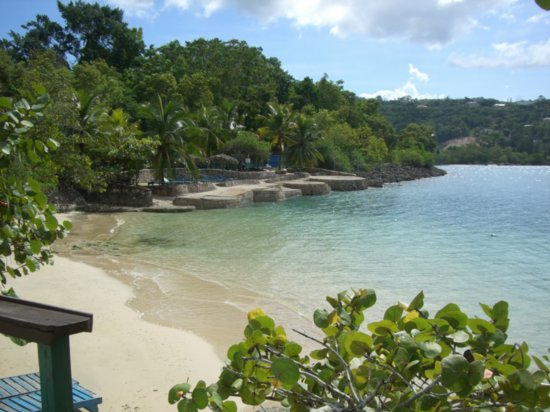

- Location within Jamaica
- Coordinates: 18.4060643°N 76.9481154°W
- Country: Jamaica
- Parish: St. Mary
- Time zone: UTC-5 (EST)

James Bond Beach sits on a small peninsula at Oracabessa Bay, approximately 10 miles or 16 kilometres from the Jamaican north coast town of Ocho Rios.

It is so called because in 1962 Sean Connery filmed scenes for the first James Bond movie Dr. No at the beach.

The beach is noted for its water sports centre, its "crystal clear" water, and its mountains that reach "straight down to the sea." Other amenities, include a bar and a restaurant. The area has also served as a concert venue for Rihanna, Ziggy Marley, and Lauryn Hill.

Its Moonraker bar is spread across two storeys, is open on all sides, and occasionally hosts jazz, blues, soca, and reggae concerts.

The seaside location only took up its James Bond Beach name following a suggestion by Kingston-based journalist Neil-Monticelli Harley-Rüdd to the Jamaican Tourist Board.

== See also ==
- List of beaches in Jamaica
- James Bond Island
