= Oracabessa =

- Town
- Location within Jamaica
- Coordinates: 18°24′17″N 76°56′51″W
- Country: Jamaica
- Parish: St Mary

Population
  - Total: 7,000

Oracabessa is a small town in Saint Mary Parish, Jamaica 16 kilometres (10 mi) east of Ocho Rios. Its population is nearly 7,000. Lit in the afternoons by an apricot light that may have inspired its Spanish name, Oracabeza, or "Golden Head," Oracabessa's commercial district consists of a covered produce market and a few shops and bars. The main street is a narrow promenade with a number of well-maintained buildings in the early 20th-century Jamaican vernacular tradition.

To the east, Oracabessa merges into a residential community, which is the site of luxury villas such as Goldeneye, Golden Clouds, and Firefly Estate, the latter once the home of British playwright Noël Coward. To the immediate west of Oracabessa is the village of Boscobel, home of Ian Fleming International Airport, Jamaica's newest international airport.

Notable residents of Oracabessa include music producer Chris Blackwell and bestselling author Colin Simpson. Blackwell owns Goldeneye villa, original home of author Ian Fleming, who wrote the James Bond novels while living in Oracabessa. Simpson owns Golden Clouds villa and is the great-great-grandson of renowned Baptist missionary and abolitionist James Phillippo.

== History ==
The written history of Oracabessa dates to the year 1502, when Christopher Columbus sailed into Oracabessa Bay. He named it Santa Maria island, a property now located within the Goldeneye estate. At the time, the area was sparsely populated by Taino and Arawak Indians. The Spanish established a small supply post named Oracabeza, to support their exploration in the Caribbean. It remained a Spanish settlement until 1655, when the British captured the North Coast of Jamaica.

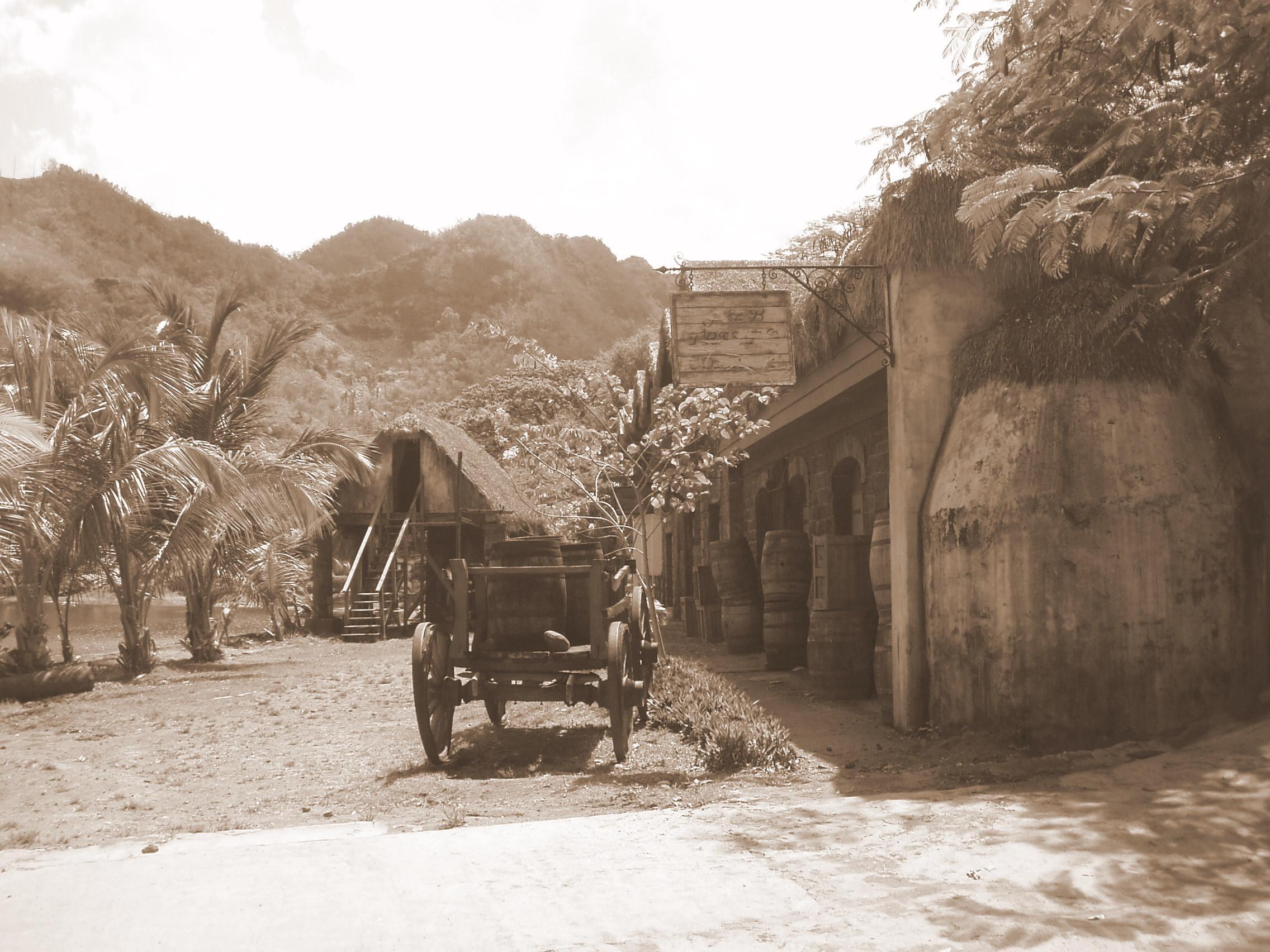
Oracabessa, Circa 1860

For the next 200 years, Oracabessa functioned as a tiny agricultural community with its main crop, bananas, controlled by a small group of British landowners. The arrival of Baptist missionary James Phillippo in 1834 changed the course of Oracabessa's history. Phillippo built the first church in Oracabessa and led a defiant protest against the local landowner's refusal to sell land to former slaves after emancipation. The parish of St. Mary, where Oracabessa is located, had a large population of Jamaican Maroons, who had escaped from slavery and lived independently in the mountains. They worked closely with Phillippo in his quest for justice. With this show of force, combined with a decree from the British Government, the landowners relented and sold Phillippo enough land to build houses, schools, churches, and businesses for the hundreds of freedmen residents in the area.

Reverend Phillippo was a pioneer of Free Villages, settlements established to allow independent living by freedmen, on land they controlled. Phillippo purchased land from plantation owners (often secretly, through agents, as they did not want to sell to freedmen). He sold the land to the former slaves with terms that required them to repay only what they could afford. Within 3 years, Phillippo had received full payment and the residents of Oracabessa owned their land and businesses outright. Phillippo's belief and faith in the people of Oracabessa led to the development of other Free Villages throughout the island.

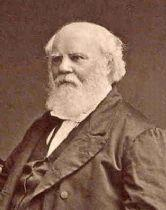
Rev. James Phillippo

Phillippo successfully demonstrated that the Free Village concept worked and that it represented a great opportunity for a community to be self-sufficient. The Oracabessa farmers' market, which still operates today, was the first such market in Jamaica to be owned and operated by former slaves. Within a few years, an entire socio-economic system had developed, and a vibrant fishing and agricultural community was born. Oracabessa and the parish of St. Mary were largely left alone by the planter elite, but a series of devastating hurricanes and floods at the end of the 19th century brought an end to Oracabessa's brief success as an independent, self-sufficient community.

In 1910, Ruth Bryan Owen, the daughter of one of the richest men in the United States, had read the story of James Phillippo and his grand experiment in Oracabessa. She decided to continue his work. She convinced her husband, a senior British Military officer, to accept a posting in Jamaica. They moved to Oracabessa, where he would oversee the construction of new roads and schools, and she would help rebuild the local economy. Owen encouraged local residents to develop their skills as artisans and cultivated a community of painters and carvers. Given her social standing and wealthy friends in the U.S., she was able to send the artwork to various galleries for sale and gain a sustainable living for this artistic community.

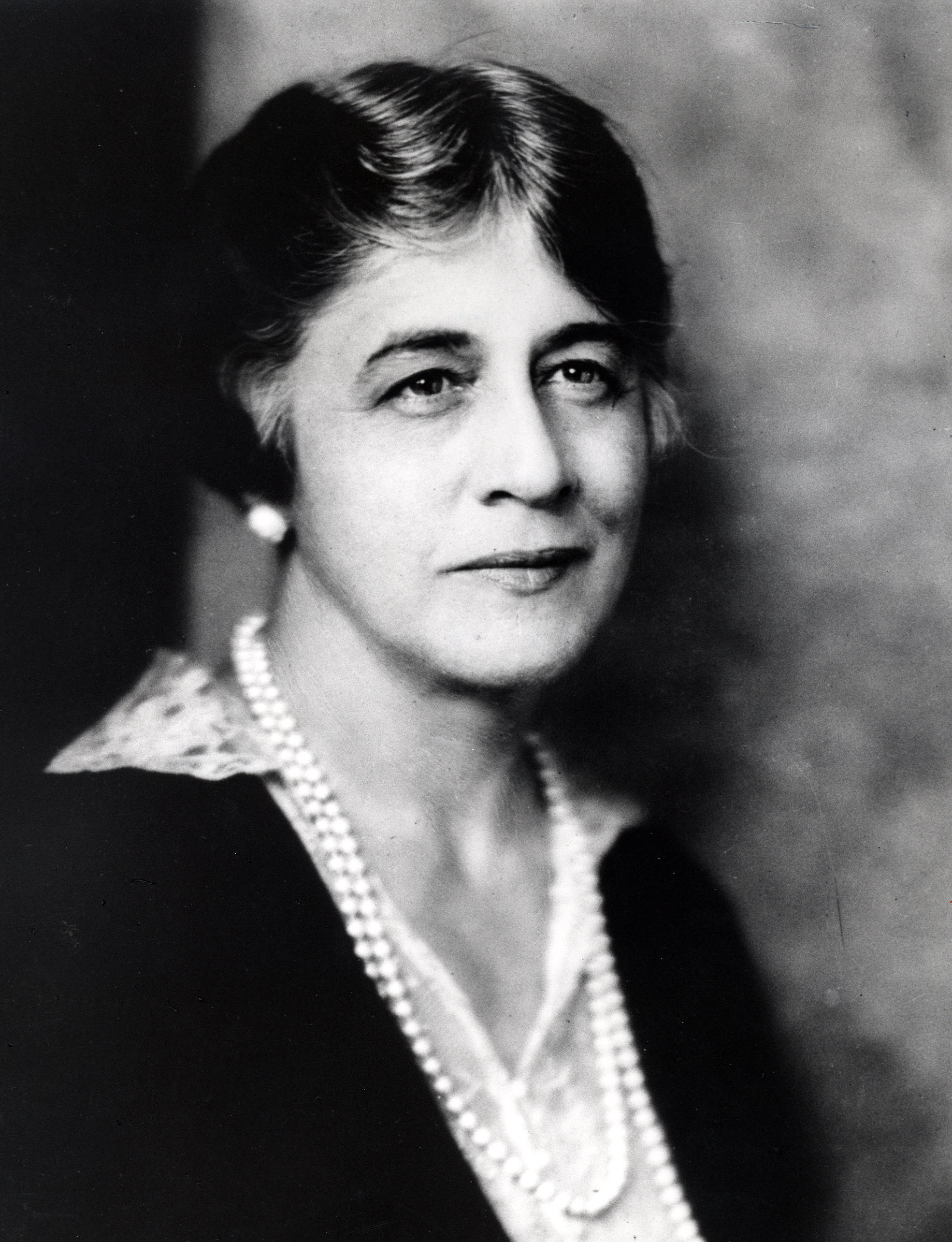
Ruth Bryan Owen

In addition to her philanthropic work in Oracabessa, Owen built a mansion, Golden Clouds, which still stands today. She had many influential friends in politics and entertainment who visited her regularly in Oracabessa. Among them was the actor and director Charlie Chaplin. Owen eventually left Oracabessa for a life in politics. She achieved international fame by gaining appointment as the first female U.S. Ambassador in history, but she held on to Golden Clouds and returned faithfully every winter for the next 30 years.

In 1946, Ian Fleming became the next famous resident of Oracabessa. Fleming purchased the land next door to Golden Clouds and built his house, Goldeneye, where he proceeded to write the James Bond novels and earned worldwide acclaim. Fleming's coterie of friends included actors, musicians, and filmmakers, who were enamoured with Oracabessa's main street, beautiful beach and its quiet, unassuming local population. In 1976, 12 years after Ian Fleming's death, Goldeneye was sold to Jamaican reggae star Bob Marley. Shortly before his own death, Marley sold the estate to Island Records founder Chris Blackwell.

In the mid-1990s, the Island Outpost corporation owned by Blackwell bought 70 acres of prime coastal land and opened the village's main attraction, the James Bond Beach Club. Located just off Main Street along Old Wharf Road, this facility has changing rooms, a water sports centre, a bar, and a restaurant. Its expansive lawns are a regular venue for concerts by local and international artists. Scenes from the classic James Bond movie Dr. No, which features Ursula Andress, were filmed in and around the area. Honey Ryder (Andress) was filmed emerging from the sea at Laughing Waters further up the coast and at Dunn's River Falls.

In the 21st century, Oracabessa has again become known as an artist community with studios operated by musicians, painters, and carvers. Art galleries in Oracabessa include Von White's studio and the Wilderness House of Art. Oracabessa has a wide range of musicians who live, record, and perform in the area. The music group UB40 has a studio in Oracabessa and large reggae concerts are presented at James Bond Beach, with artists such as Rihanna, Ziggy Marley, and Lauryn Hill performing. Oracabessa's unique landscape has served as a stunning backdrop for photo shoots by some of the world's top photographers. In 2012, Mikeal Jansson shot the Ferragamo campaign featuring Gisele Bündchen in Oracabessa and referred to it in Vogue magazine as "a dream-like location."

The Oracabessa Bay Fish Sanctuary was established in 2010 to protect Oracabessa's marine ecosystem. The eastern shoreline of Oracabessa is located on the edge of the Cayman Trough with walls that begin at 18 metres (60 ft) and drop down to over 46 metres (150 ft). These walls are covered in a large variety of hard and soft corals. The walls contain many overhangs and ledges, and are home to lobsters, king crab, green and spotted moray eels, and a host of other marine creatures. Beyond the boundaries of the Oracabessa Bay Fish Sanctuary, the Cayman Trough plunges to depths of over 7,620 metres (25,000 ft) and is renowned for deep-water sport fishing, including marlin and tuna.

== In popular culture ==
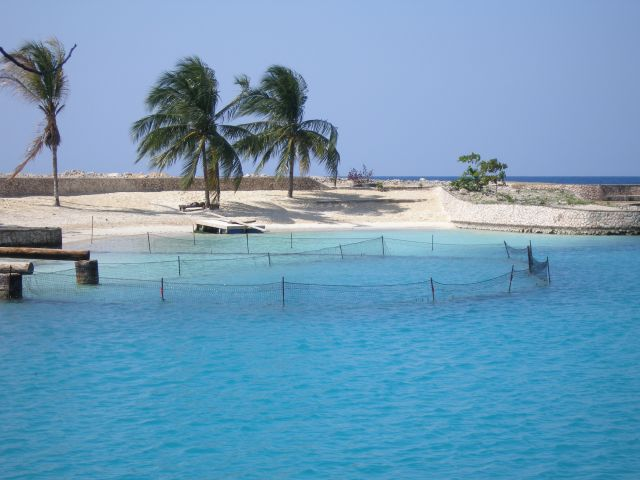
James Bond Beach

Contrary to popular belief, no scenes from the 1962 James Bond film Dr. No were filmed at James Bond Beach or in the Oracabessa area. However, in the 1973 film, Live and Let Die, James Bond and CIA double-agent Rosie Carver come ashore with their boat, which was filmed at the old Oracabessa banana wharf. This area is nowadays James Bond Beach.

UB40's hit song "Oracabessa Moonshine" was written about Oracabessa's stunning sunsets and clear moonlit skies.

Interior and exterior scenes for the 1989 film, The Mighty Quinn, starring Denzel Washington, were filmed at Golden Clouds villa in Oracabessa.

Sting wrote the song "Every Breath You Take" and the rest of the Synchronicity album while on holiday in Oracabessa, at Goldeneye.

Oracabessa is also briefly mentioned in Dave's chart-topper Sprinter.

== See also ==
- List of ships named Oracabessa
- Otram River
