= Bob Woolmer =

English cricketer (1948–2007)

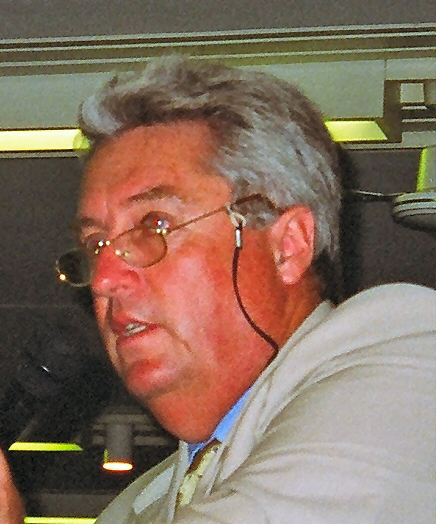
- Woolmer in December 1999

Personal information
- Full name: Robert Andrew Woolmer
- Born: 14 May 1948; Cawnpore, United Provinces, India
- Died: 18 March 2007 (aged 58); Kingston, Jamaica
- Nickname: Woollie, The-Bob
- Height: 6 ft 0 in (1.83 m)
- Batting: Right-handed
- Bowling: Right-arm medium
- Role: All-rounder
- Relatives: Clarence Woolmer (father)

International information
- National side: England
- Test debut (cap 463): 31 July 1975 v Australia
- Last Test: 2 July 1981 v Australia
- ODI debut (cap 16): 24 August 1972 v Australia
- Last ODI: 28 August 1976 v West Indies

Domestic team information
- Years: Team
- 1968–1984: Kent
- 1973/74–1975/76: Natal
- 1980/81: Western Province

Head coaching information
- Years: Team
- 1994–1999: South Africa
- 2004–2007: Pakistan

Career statistics
Competition	Tests	ODI	FC	LA
Matches	19	6	350	290
Runs scored	1,059	21	15,772	4,078
Batting average	33.09	5.25	33.55	20.39
100s/50s	3/2	0/0	34/71	1/17
Top score	149	9	203	112*
Balls bowled	546	321	25,823	13,473
Wickets	4	9	420	374
Bowling average	74.75	28.88	25.87	20.64
5 wickets in innings	0	0	12	3
10 wickets in match	0	0	1	0
Best bowling	1/8	3/33	7/47	6/9
Catches/stumpings	10/–	3/–	239/1	98/–
Medal record
Men's Cricket
ICC KnockOut Trophy
Representing South Africa as Coach
Winner	1998
- Source: CricInfo, 22 August 2007

Robert Andrew Woolmer (14 May 1948 – 18 March 2007) was an English cricket coach, cricketer, and a commentator. He played in 19 Test matches and six One Day Internationals for the England cricket team and later coached South Africa, Warwickshire and Pakistan. During his coaching career with South Africa, he led the team to being the winners of the 1998 ICC KnockOut Trophy, first of the only two ICC titles the country has won to date.

On 18 March 2007, Woolmer died suddenly in Jamaica, just a few hours after the Pakistan team's unexpected elimination at the hands of Ireland in the 2007 Cricket World Cup. Shortly afterwards, Jamaican police announced that they were opening a murder investigation into Woolmer's death. In November 2007, a jury in Jamaica recorded an open verdict on Woolmer's death.

== Early life ==
Woolmer was born in the Georgina McRobert Memorial Hospital across the road from the Green Park Stadium in Kanpur, India on 14 May 1948. His father was the cricketer Clarence Woolmer, who represented United Provinces (now Uttar Pradesh) in the Ranji Trophy. At the age of 10, Woolmer witnessed Hanif Mohammad scoring 499, setting a world record for the highest score in first-class cricket. Some 35 years later, Woolmer, as coach of Warwickshire County Cricket Club, was watching when the county's batsman Brian Lara passed that mark, setting a new record of 501 not out.

Woolmer went to school in Kent, first at Yardley Court in Tonbridge and then The Skinners' School in Royal Tunbridge Wells. When he was 15, Colin Page, the coach and captain of the Kent second XI, converted him from an off-spinner to a medium pace bowler.

Woolmer's first job was as a sales representative for ICI, and his first senior cricket was with the Tunbridge Wells Cricket Club and with Kent's second XI.

== Selection for Kent ==
In 1968, at the age of 20, Woolmer joined the Kent cricket staff and made his championship debut against Essex. His ability to move the ball about at medium-pace was ideally suited to one-day cricket at which he became a specialist. He won his county cap in 1969. Woolmer began his coaching career in South Africa in 1970–71 at the age of 22 and by 1975, when he made his Test debut, he had become a teacher of physical education at Holmewood House prep school in Kent as well as running his own cricket school – at the time one of the youngest cricket school owners anywhere.

== Playing career ==
Woolmer played English county cricket for Kent, initially as an all-rounder. He graduated to Test cricket with England in 1975 again, at first, as an all-rounder, having taken a hat-trick for MCC against the touring Australian cricket team with his fast-medium bowling. But he was dropped after his first Test, only reappearing in the final match of the series at The Oval where he scored 149, batting at number five, then the slowest Test century for England against Australia. He was only sparingly used as a bowler in test cricket, taking just 4 wickets overall, but further batting success followed over the next two seasons, including two further centuries against Australia in 1977. Rarely for an Englishman since the Second World War, all his Test centuries were made against Australia.

Woolmer was also a regular in England ODI cricket from 1972 to 1976. But Woolmer's international career stalled after he joined the World Series break-away group run by Kerry Packer. He continued to have success with Kent, helping them to win the County Championship and the Benson and Hedges Cup in 1978, winning the man of the match award in the final of the latter. But though he was recalled to the Test team for four matches in 1980 and 1981 after the World Series Cricket affair was over, he never recaptured the form of the mid-1970s. He also took part in the first rebel tour of South Africa of 1982, a move that effectively ended his international career.

== Coaching career ==
Woolmer obtained his coaching qualification in 1968.

=== In South Africa ===
After retiring from first-class cricket in 1984, he emigrated to South Africa, where he coached cricket and hockey at high schools. He also became involved in the Avendale Cricket Club in Athlone, Cape Town. He preferred to join a 'coloured' club rather than a 'white' one in apartheid South Africa. He was an inspiration to Avendale and was instrumental in assisting the club to grow and be successful. Because of him, there is still an annual programme for a talented Avendale cricketer to spend a summer at Lord Wandsworth College in Hampshire. Woolmer was the coach when South Africa won the 1998 ICC KnockOut Trophy, and in the same year the country won gold in the 1998 Commonwealth Games.

=== In England ===
He returned to England in 1987 to coach the second eleven at Kent. He went on to coach the Warwickshire County Cricket Club in 1991, the team winning the Natwest Trophy in 1993, and three out of four trophies contested the next year. He continued his success by leading Warwickshire to Natwest and County Championship success in 1995, before taking on the Post of South African National Coach.

Woolmer is thought to be the only person to have witnessed both Brian Lara's innings of 501 not out against Durham in 1994 and Hanif Mohammad's 499 in Karachi in 1958.

=== Coaching methods ===
Woolmer was known for his progressive coaching techniques. He is credited with having made the reverse sweep a more popular shot for batsmen in the 1990s, as well as being one of the first to use computer analysis, and trying to adapt the knowledge of goalkeepers to wicketkeepers in cricket. He later attracted attention at the 1999 World Cup by communicating with his captain Hansie Cronje with an earpiece during matches. The practice was later banned.

=== South Africa ===
He was appointed coach of South Africa in 1994. Initially his team performed poorly, losing all six matches on his first outing in Pakistan. However, in the next five years, South Africa won most of their Test (10 out of 15 series) and One Day International matches (73%). However, the team failed to win either the 1996 World Cup or the 1999 World Cup, despite having the highest ODI success rate among international teams in that period. However his greatest success as a coach was when his team won the inaugural ICC champions trophy (then called Wills international cup or ICC Knockouts trophy).

At the 1996 tournament on the Indian subcontinent, his team won all their preliminary group matches before succumbing to the West Indies in the quarter finals.

After this in 1998, South Africa won their first and to this day their only ICC tournament as they won the ICC Knockouts trophy held in Bangladesh. This was also the first team South Africa had played an ICC tournament final. Jacques Kallis was given the player of the tournament award in this tournament.

At the 1999 tournament, South Africa faced Australia in the final match of the Super Six round; Australia needed to win to qualify for the semifinals, whereas South Africa had already done so. Australia boasted a superior recent record in must-win matches against South Africa. Media speculation was focused on Woolmer's team being less adept at handling high pressure situations. In the 1997/98 Australian international season, Australia had lost all four of their qualifying matches against South Africa in a triangular tournament and conceded a 1–0 finals series lead, before recovering to take the series 2–1. The Super Six match saw Australia win the match in the last over, after Herschelle Gibbs dropped Australian captain Steve Waugh in a premature celebration of a catch. Waugh went on to score an unbeaten century and score the winning runs. The semifinal rematch saw a late Australian comeback culminate in a tie, when with match scores level, South African batsmen Lance Klusener and Allan Donald had a mix up, with Donald dropping his bat and being run out. As a result, South Africa were eliminated due to their inferior performance in the earlier matches, and Woolmer resigned.

Woolmer was a strong candidate to replace David Lloyd as coach of England in 1999 but wanted a break from cricket and was reluctant to lead England in a tour of South Africa so soon after having relinquished the South African coaching job.

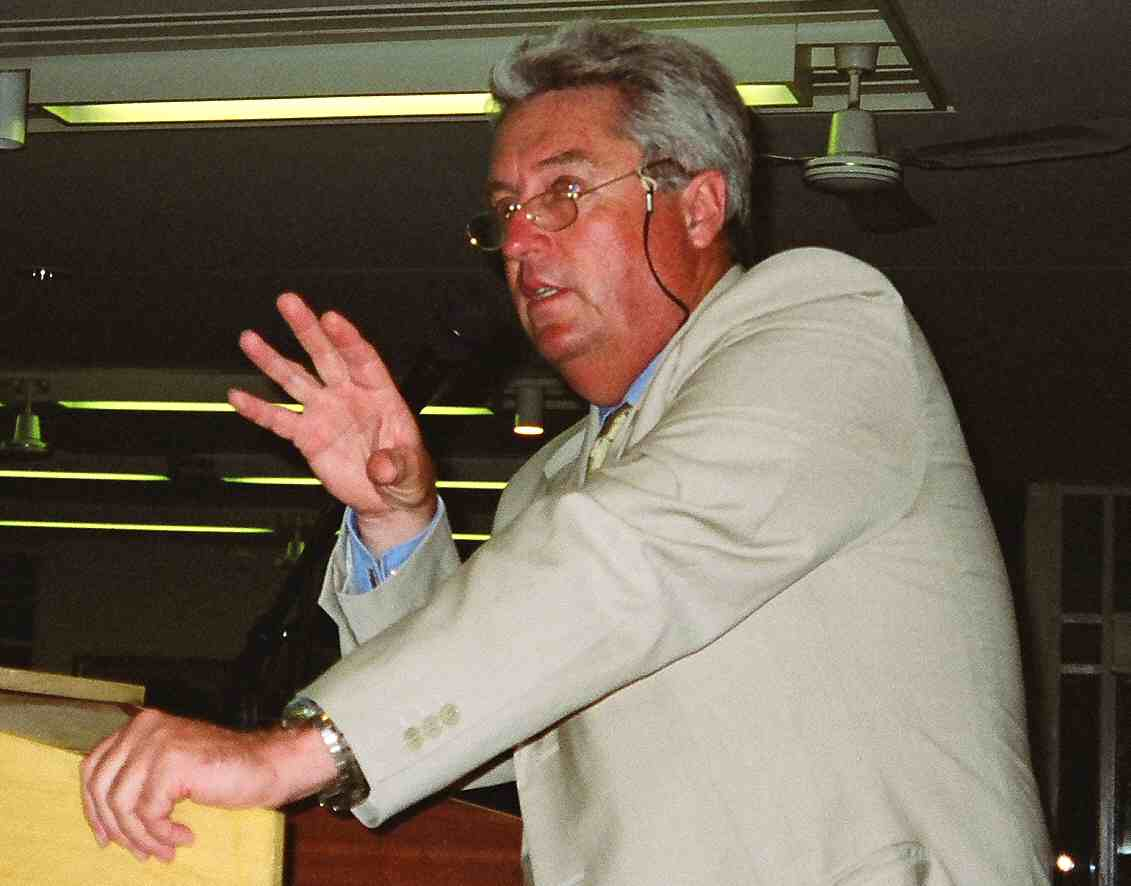
Woolmer speaking at a cricket dinner in Cape Town in December 1999

=== Back to Warwickshire ===
He later returned to Warwickshire, and gained attention when he called for the removal of a life ban on South African captain Hansie Cronje for match-fixing. Woolmer spoke openly about Cronje and match fixing in an interview on the BBC TV programme "Panorama" in May 2001. He then worked for the International Cricket Council in helping with cricket development in countries where the sport was not well established.

=== Pakistan ===
He was appointed coach of the Pakistan team in 2004. This came after Javed Miandad was sacked when the Pakistanis conceded a 2–1 Test and 3–2 ODI series loss on home soil to arch rivals India, their first series win there in two decades. He was feted when his team reversed the result in early 2005 on their return tour to India, drawing the Tests 1–1 and winning the ODI series 4–2. In 2005 Pakistan beat England in a home series immediately after England had beaten the Australian team in England to secure the Ashes. In the home series against India that followed, Woolmer's team were victorious in the Test series, winning it 1–0; however, they lost the ODI series that followed 4–1. Pakistan then beat Sri Lanka 2–0 in a 3 ODI series and achieved a 3rd consecutive Test series win with a 1–0 win in a 2 test series with Sri Lanka.

==== 2006 ball-tampering row ====
In August 2006, on the eve of Pakistan's Twenty20 international against England in Bristol, Woolmer was forced to defend his reputation when it was claimed Pakistani players lifted the seam of the ball when he was in charge of the team. Former International Cricket Council match referee Barry Jarman alleged that during the 1997 triangular one-day tournament involving South Africa, Zimbabwe and India, a match ball, still in Jarman's possession, that was confiscated after just 16 overs showed evidence of tampering by Woolmer's team. Woolmer could not recall any such incident and he denied advocating ball-tampering. He also indicated that he contacted the match officials from that game who also could not recall any such incident.

Woolmer stated in 2006 that he believed that ball-tampering should be allowed in cricket and that a modification to existing laws should be made.

== Death ==
On 18 March 2007 – the day after Pakistan were knocked out of the 2007 World Cup, and three days before their final game of the tournament – Woolmer was found dead in his hotel room at the Jamaica Pegasus Hotel in Kingston, Jamaica. The initial report was that Woolmer had died of a heart attack. On 22 March, Jamaican police confirmed that an investigation had been launched because of the circumstances of Woolmer's death, based on a report by pathologist Ere Seshaiah that Woolmer had died of asphyxia via manual strangulation. Deputy Police Commissioner Mark Shields led the investigation.

On 12 June 2007, Lucius Thomas, the commissioner of the Jamaica Constabulary Force, announced that the investigation had concluded that Woolmer had died of natural causes, and was not murdered as indicated by the earlier pathologist's report. Three independent pathologists' reports commissioned by the police had found that the initial conclusion of manual strangulation was incorrect, and toxicology tests found no evidence of poisoning. The findings of the pathologists, and of Metropolitan Police detectives who had visited Jamaica to assist with the investigation, were reported in the weeks leading up to the announcement, which was widely expected by the time it was made. Reports suggested that Woolmer suffered from health problems including an enlarged heart and diabetes, which may have contributed to his death.

On 6 November, coroner Patrick Murphy asked for further tests to be carried out on samples taken from Woolmer's body following discrepancies in the toxicology reports by forensic scientists from the Caribbean and the UK.

After hearing twenty-six days of evidence, the jury at the inquest returned an open verdict, refusing to rule out the controversial strangulation theory put forward by Ere Seshaiah.

In an interview with Fox News, former South African cricketer Clive Rice claimed that Woolmer was murdered by organised crime groups, saying "These mafia betting syndicates do not stop at anything and they do not care who gets in their way".

Former Australian captain Ian Chappell has also gone on record stating that he "doubts that he died of natural causes" and speculated that Woolmer may have been about to reveal "some misgivings".

An article appearing in the Journal of Sport and Social Issues in 2010 suggested that there were links in the reporting of context surrounding Woolmer's death and Islamophobia in the British media.

That a British policeman was sent to solve his murder became the inspiration of the crime-drama TV series Death in Paradise.

== Awards and honours ==
- One of five Wisden Cricketers of the Year in 1976
- Green Park Stadium in Kanpur, Woolmer's birthplace, is nicknamed as Woolmer's Turf in his honour. Also the street surrounding the stadium is named Woolmer Street in memorial of Woolmer.
- Posthumously honoured with the Sitara-e-Imtiaz (Star of Excellence), a high ranking civil award of Pakistan, for his contribution to Pakistan cricket
- Cricket academy named after Bob Woolmer in Lahore "Bob Woolmer National Indoor Cricket Academy Lahore"
