= John Pringle (Jamaican businessman) =

Entrepreneur, Ambassador, Public Servant

John Kenneth McKenzie Pringle CBE OJ (October 4, 1925 – December 12, 2006) was an entrepreneur, Jamaican ambassador, advertising executive and founder of one of Jamaica's hotels Round Hill. Pringle was the youngest member of the Legislative Council of Jamaica when appointed aged 31. He was the first director of tourism serving between 1963 and 1967, where he tripled Jamaica's tourism revenues in four years. Pringle also served as chairman of the Jamaica Tourist Board and chairman of Jamaica's trade organization JAMCO where he championed Jamaica's interests in the banana industry. He served as the European Chairman of advertising agency DDB from 1967. He later became a film and television producer and in the 1990s went back to his routes as a hotelier, helping Chris Blackwell develop his hotels in Jamaica, including Strawberry Hill in Jamaica and The Tides in South Beach, Florida. In 2004 Jamaica made a set of stamps with Pringle and Round Hill and awarded him with the highest honor the Order of Jamaica (OJ). Pringle was awarded the Commander of the British Empire (CBE) in 1965. He died December 12, 2006, aged 81.
