= Island Outpost =

Island Outpost is a collection of distinctive Jamaican hotels and villas. Their properties include The Caves, Strawberry Hill, Goldeneye Hotel and Resort and the Fleming Villa. The management company was founded and run by Chris Blackwell.
