= Mark Shields (police officer) =

British law enforcement officer and security consultant

- Born: 1957 (age 68–69)
- Known for: Deputy Commissioner of Police (Crime) Jamaica Constabulary Force 2004-2009 Investigation into the death of Bob Woolmer Owner Shields Crime & Security Consultants
- Height: 6 ft 6 in (1.98 m)
- Title: Managing Director - Shields Crime & Security Former Deputy Police Commissioner of the Jamaica Constabulary Force
- Term: From 2004

Mark Shields (born 1957) is a former British law enforcement officer and security consultant. After nearly three decades of service with the City of London, Essex and the Metropolitan Police Services, in 2005 he moved to Jamaica to take up a new position as Deputy Police Commissioner of the Jamaica Constabulary Force. In that capacity, he came to worldwide attention as he led the investigation into the death of Pakistan's cricket coach Bob Woolmer in the run-up to the 2007 Cricket World Cup finals. The Guardian credits him as "the British officer who changed policing in Jamaica".

== Early career ==
Shields began his law enforcement career in 1976 at the age of 17. He served as the head of the City of London Police's special branch from 1987 to 1990. He also spent time as a member of the National Criminal Intelligence Service posted to Frankfurt, Germany as a drugs and organised crime liaison officer.

Shields later moved on to the Metropolitan Police Service, where he rose to the rank of Detective Chief Superintendent. He once investigated a kidnapping plot against Victoria Beckham. He also led investigations which resulted in the 2002 discovery of a large weapons cache in Hillingdon believed to have been stored by a criminal gang or professional contract killer. He was the project manager on the strengthening of the "Ring of Steel" anti-terrorism cordon around the City of London.

Shields' work at Scotland Yard also included investigations into organized crime and as a kidnap senior investigating officer. He gained a reputation for expertise in this area, and later began playing a more international role as a result. Shields first came to Jamaica at the request of Allan Brown of London's Metropolitan Police Service to aid in the investigation of Reneto Adams and four other policemen charged with 7 May 2003 murder of four civilians at Kraal, Clarendon Parish. Shields was successful in breaking a wall of silence from the Jamaican police, persuading four officers to testify against their colleagues; however, the prosecutor was unable to secure a conviction, in an acquittal widely viewed as corrupt by the Jamaican public.

== As Deputy Commissioner in Jamaica ==
=== Assignment ===
On the basis of his earlier role in bringing the Adams case to trial, Shields was assigned on secondment to the Jamaica Constabulary Force in 2005. He was one of a number of foreign police officers recruited for the JCF in those years, the others being fellow Britons Les Green and Justice Felice, and Canadian Paul Martin. Among the aims of the recruitment exercise were to augment the force's capabilities for intelligence activities and investigation. With his appointment, the Jamaican and British police would better co-ordinate their efforts over the gang- and drug-related violence affecting both countries.

Shields introduced a number of procedural and technological reforms in the JCF which were credited with increasing the arrest and conviction rate, including systematic digitisation of fingerprints taken from arrested suspects, increased introduction of closed-circuit television cameras, and further use of DNA evidence. From 2005 to 2006, the number of murders in Jamaica fell by 20 percent, from 1,680 to 1,340. He also stressed getting the community involved through neighbourhood watch programs and independent advisory groups who would liaise with the police and build trust between the two groups. There was some concern over whether British policing methods would be effective in the different culture and situation of Jamaica. Shields described Jamaica as presenting different challenges than his native Britain, noting that while the crime rate was higher in Jamaica, there were far fewer people committing those crimes; in simple words, his solution was "to target the gunmen". He also sought to fight corruption in the JCF.

Shields earned respect for the personal risk he took in combating deep-set corruption and violence, and for his perceived honesty. He had initially been worried that he would be seen as a "colonialist" as a white man going into a black community in an authority position, but his fears about public perceptions of his role turned out to be unfounded. As for his relations with the rest of the JCF, his position was newly created for his arrival, meaning that he was not blocking anyone else's chances for promotion. However, local colleagues complained that Shields often took the lead in high-profile investigations as a means of garnering media attention. His tenure was also marked by conflict with then-Leader of the Opposition Bruce Golding over policing in Tivoli Gardens, Kingston.

=== Woolmer case ===
Shields was brought into the international spotlight by his investigation into the March 2007 death of the Pakistan Cricket Coach, Bob Woolmer. At the time, hundreds of journalists were in the West Indies to cover the Cricket World Cup, making the media response to the suspected murder immediate and intense. Their interest increased once Shields announced a pathologist's findings that Woolmer's death was caused by manual strangulation. Shields held frequent updates in the lobby of Jamaica Pegasus Hotel where Woolmer's body was found, and himself became the focus of media attention – too much, his detractors claimed.

Shields also expressed frustration with the media's pressure for immediate answers and a rapid arrest, and their insinuations that the death was an inside job by someone from the Pakistani team, speculation which Shields rejected. Shields turned to his old Scotland Yard colleagues to review the investigation as he was not convinced of Dr Ere Seshiah, the pathologist's determination that Woolmer had been strangled. Shields ordered a re-examination of Woolmer's body and the recovery of the hyoid bone, which Seshiah believed was broken, indicating that Woolmer had been strangled.

Shields engaged the services of three internationally recognised forensic pathologists, Professor Lorna Martin Cape Town, South Africa, Michael Pollanen in Canada and top Home Office pathologist, Nat Carey in the UK. They independently agreed that Wooler had died of natural causes, completely discrediting the claims made by Seshiah. Based on this work and with the full support of the Woolmer family, their investigation reached a startlingly different result: they stated that Woolmer had died of a heart attack.

In late November, after 26 days of testimony from 57 witnesses, the 11-member jury convened to conduct the inquest into Woolmer's death concluded that there was insufficient evidence to return a verdict on its cause. Shields then announced that the JCF did not intend to pursue further investigation.

=== Beach theft ===
On July 20th of 2008 some 500 truckloads of white sand was stolen from a beach in Trelawny. The subsequent case never was resolved and as deputy commissioner for crime at the Jamaica Constabulary Force, Shields expressed the complexity of the crime regarding the possible police briberies, many suspects, and possible recipients of the sand.

== Exit from JCF and subsequent work ==
In November 2008, the Ministry of National Security announced that Shields had declined an extension of his contract, and subsequently would be leaving the JCF. Investigations into Christopher "Dudus" Coke and his Tivoli Gardens stronghold began under Shields' watch, but it would not be until a year after his departure from the JCF that they would come to fruition with Coke's arrest.

After the end of his contract, Shields announced that he would establish his own company, Shields Crime and Security Consultants. He supported Owen Ellington's bid to succeed his former boss Rear Admiral Hardley Lewin as Police Commissioner. Through his consultancy work, he would encourage Caribbean law enforcement agencies to adopt advanced technology and forensic techniques such as DNA profiling and telephone tapping on mobile phones. However, he acknowledged that there were significant barriers to implementing these techniques, such as the atmosphere of mistrust between the policing and the telecommunications sectors in Jamaica.

== Personal life ==
Shields was born in London, the son of a nurse and a civil servant in the Ministry of Defence. Shields married his first wife in 1987, and had two children with her. He attended the University of Essex on a police scholarship, where he studied government and politics.

In Jamaica, outside of his work hours he enjoyed a bon vivant lifestyle, and was described as "one of Jamaica's 30 most eligible men" by the Jamaica Gleaner. In 2007, he was reported to have been in a serious relationship for two years with a 24-year-old local fashion designer, but they separated soon after. He lives in the upscale Norbrook neighbourhood of the Kingston Metropolitan Area. On one occasion police showed up with a warrant to search his house, but it turned out they were actually looking for the house of his neighbour Vybz Kartel; Shields' boss Lewin later apologised to him over the incident.

Shields married Emily Crooks, an attorney at law and broadcast journalist. They have a daughter, Zuri born in 2009.
