= Pegasus Hotel =

Pegasus Hotel may refer to:

- Jamaica Pegasus Hotel, a hotel in Kingston, Jamaica
