= Frenchman's Cove Resort =

Hotel in Port Antonio, Jamaica

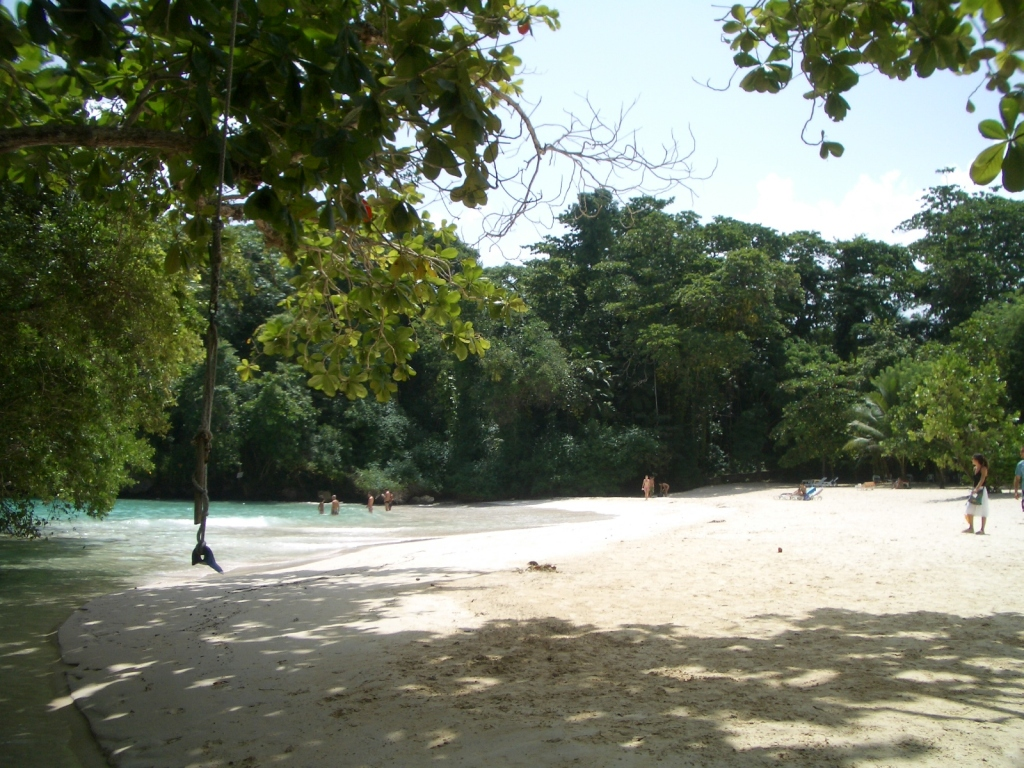
- The beach at Frenchman's Cove

- Location within Jamaica

General information
- Location: Port Antonio, Jamaica
- Coordinates: 18.1751913°N 76.4009213°W

Website
- www.frenchmanscove.com

Frenchman's Cove Resort, previously known as Frenchman's Cove Hotel, is a hotel located on a 42-acre (170,000 m^{2}) property near Port Antonio on Jamaica's northeastern shore. It is considered to be the world's first all-inclusive hotel with a history indicating its role in Jamaica's tourism industry.

The hotel was popular with guests in the 1960s and considered to be one of the most expensive hotels at the time at $1000 per week. It is currently underused. Nevertheless, and although very small in size the Frenchman's Cove beach is one of the best in the island even when compared with the beautiful Seven Mile's beach in Negril. The small cliffs on both sides of the sea entrance along with the clear sands, the small blue lagoon and the dense vegetation that surrounds all the area makes of this beach a place with an atmosphere absolutely unique.

== See also ==
- List of hotels in Jamaica
- List of beaches in Jamaica
