= Clarence Woolmer =

English cricketer

Clarence Shirley Woolmer (27 June 1910 in Lewisham, London, England – 10 February 1999) was a former English cricketer. He was captain of United Provinces (now Uttar Pradesh) during the Ranji Trophy in 1948–1949 against Bombay State (Maharashtra).

His son Bob Woolmer (born in Kanpur) was a cricketer for England as well as a coach of South Africa and Pakistan. When Bob was born, Clarence placed bat and ball in Bob's cot hoping that he would eventually become a cricketer.

== See also ==
- Bio on ESPNcricinfo
- CricketArchive
- "Article on Bob Woolmer". The Independent. 22 July 2006.
