= Jamaica Constabulary Force =

Law enforcement agency

- Insignia of the JCF
- Abbreviation: JCF
- Motto: Serve, Protect and Reassure

Agency overview
- Formed: 1867

Jurisdictional structure
- Operations jurisdiction: Jamaica
- Area: 10,990 sq mi (28,463.97 km^{2})
- Population: 2,838,427 (2024)

Operational structure
- Headquarters: Kingston, Jamaica
- Elected officer responsible: Horace Chang
- Agency executive: Kevin Blake, Commissioner of Police

Facilities
- Stations: 5 area headquarters; 19 divisional headquarters; 190 stations; 4 recruiting centres

Website
- Official website

The Jamaica Constabulary Force (JCF) is the national police force of Jamaica. Founded in 1867 under Law 8 of that year during the period of British colonial rule, the JCF was modelled on the Royal Irish Constabulary and intended as a civil body with a military structure. Its primary purpose under colonialism was to secure the stability of the colonial regime rather than to operate by public consent as in Britain.

The JCF is headed by a Commissioner of Police, a title that replaced Inspector General of Police in 1939, and falls under the authority of the Ministry of National Security. The force is organised into numerous specialised divisions and units, including the Criminal Investigations Branch, the Marine Division, the Narcotics Division, and the Specialised Operations Branch, among others.

Officers are trained at the National Police College of Jamaica, established in 2014 at Twickenham Park, St. Catherine, following the merger of several previously independent training institutions. The JCF equips its officers with standard personal protective equipment and has received vehicles, surveillance technology, and non-lethal equipment from both the Jamaican government and international partners including the United States, the European Union, and the Pan American Health Organization.

Since the late 1990s, the JCF has undergone a period of modernisation aimed at removing colonial inheritances from the force. The JCF has nonetheless been the subject of significant controversy, including accusations of extrajudicial killings; per capita killings by the force have been described as among the highest in the world.

== History ==
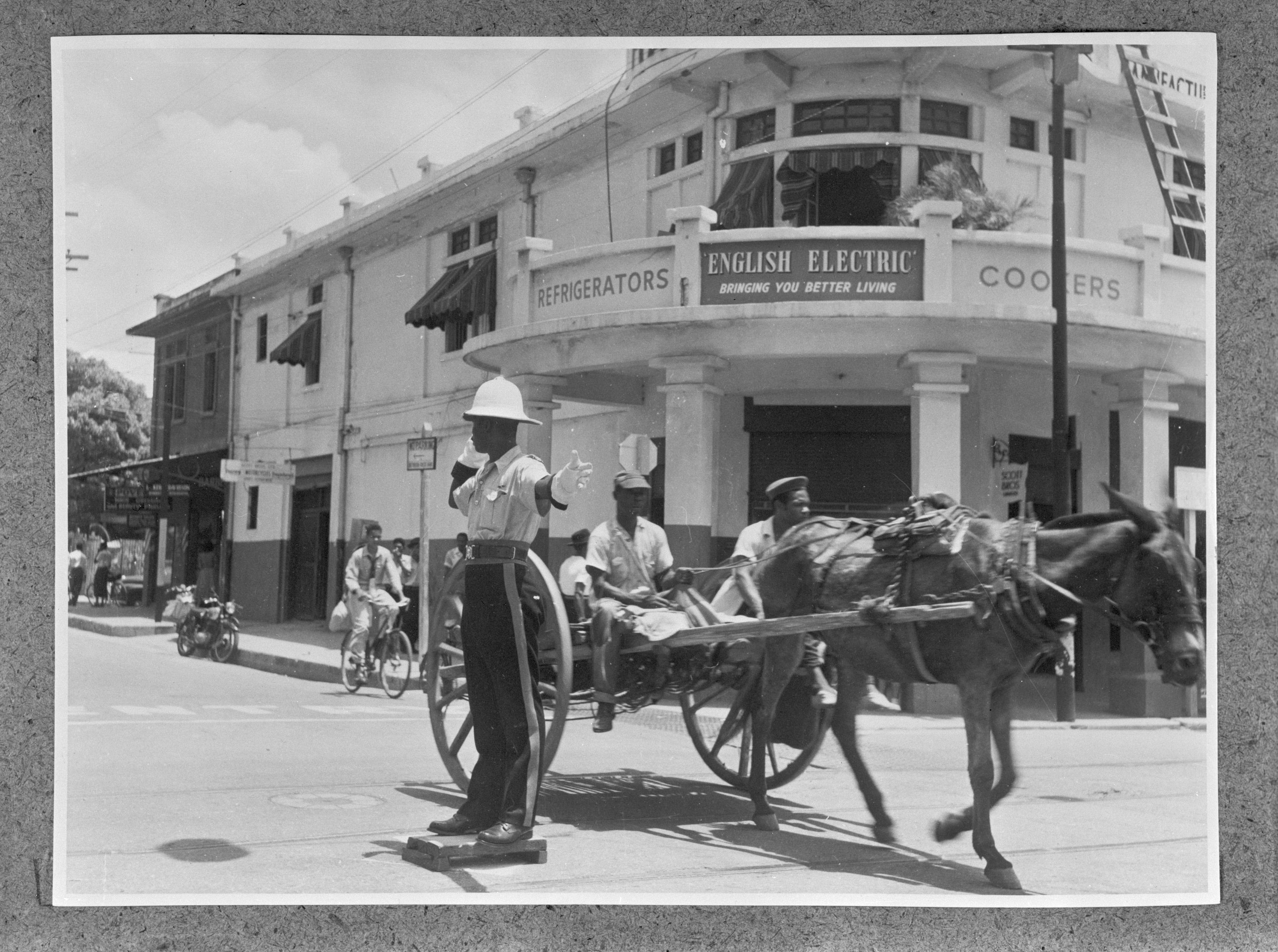
A JCF constable engaging in road traffic control, 1955

The Jamaica Constabulary Force (JCF) was established by Law 8 of 1867, during the period of British colonial rule and two years after the Morant Bay rebellion. The JCF was intended to be a civil body with a military structure and was based on the Royal Irish Constabulary. Unlike in Britain, where policing operated by public consent, the JCF's primary purpose was to secure the stability of the colonial regime.

The JCF was established with an Inspector General as its head, with a Deputy Inspector General as his deputy, and a staff of inspectors and sub-inspectors. The Inspector General was empowered to recruit constables, who could then be promoted to Acting Corporal, Corporal, Sergeant, Sergeant Major, and Staff Sergeant Major.

In 1932, the JCF had 123 police stations across the island. In 1948, it was reported that the JCF was split into three branches: the Uniformed Branch, Water Police, and Detectives.

In 1993, Trevor MacMillan was appointed as Commissioner of Police, the first outsider since independence to lead the JCF. During his tenure, he attempted to enact reforms to move the JCF from a political to a professional force, but after failed negotiations around the degree of autonomy senior officers had from the political directorate, his contract was terminated in 1996. In 1998, the JCF began a period of reform characterised as "police modernisation" but understood to involve the removal of colonial inheritances from the police.

In 2024 the JCF, alongside the Jamaica Defence Force deployed personnel as part of the Kenyan-led Multinational Security Support Mission in Haiti.

== Leadership ==
The Jamaica Constabulary Force is led by a Commissioner of Police. The title changed from Inspector General of Police in 1939. The JCF falls under the authority of the Ministry of National Security.

=== Commissioners of Police, 1867–present ===
| 1867–1878 | Major J. H. Prenderville |
| 1879–1886 | E H. B. Hartwell |
| 1887–1891 | Captain L. F. Knollys |
| 1892–1895 | Major M. J. Fawcett |
| 1900–1904 | Edward F. Wright |
| 1904–1919 | A. E. Kershaw |
| 1919–1925 | William E. Clarke |
| 1925–1932 | Col. M. D. Harrell |
| 1932–1947 | Owen (Jack) Wright |
| 1948–1953 | W. A. Calver |
| 1953–1958 | Col. R. T. Mitchelin |
| 1957–1962 | L. P. R. Browning |
| 1962–1964 | N. A. Croswell |
| 1964–1970 | A. G. Langdon |
| 1970–1973 | J. R. Middleton |
| 1973–1977 | Basil L. Robinson, |
| 1977–1980 | D. O. Campbell, |
| 1980–1982 | W. O. Bowes |
| 1982–1984 | J. E. Williams |
| 1984–1991 | Herman Emanuel Ricketts |
| 1991–1993 | Roy E. Thompson |
| 1993–1996 | Col. Trevor N. N. MacMillan |
| 1996–2005 | Francis A. Forbes |
| 2005–2007 | Lucius Thomas |
| 2007–2009 | Rear Admiral Hardley Lewin |
| 2010–2014 | Owen Ellington |
| 2014–2017 | Carl Williams, OD, CD, JP, PhD |
| 2017–2018 | George Quallo |
| 2018–2024 | Major General Antony Bertram Anderson |
| 2024–Present | Dr.Kevin Blake |

== Organisation ==
The JCF is divided into various squads and units including:

- Band Division
- Bicycle Patrol Unit
- Canine Division
- Centre for Investigation of Sexual Offences and Child Abuse (CISOCA)
- Chaplaincy Services Branch
- Constabulary Communications Network (CCN, formerly known as the Police Information Center (PIC) or Corporate Communications Unit)
- Criminal Investigations Branch (CIB)
- Department of Weapons and Tactical Training (DWTT)
- Marine Division
- Medical Services Branch (MSB)
- National Intelligence Bureau (NIB)
- Narcotics Division
- Polygraph Unit
- Public Safety and Traffic Enforcement Branch (PSTEB)
- Scenes of Crime Unit
  - Major Investigation Division
- Special Counter-Gang Task Force
- Specialized Operations Branch
- Specialized Weapons and Tactics (SWAT)
- Visual Identification Unit (VIU)

== Uniform and ranks ==
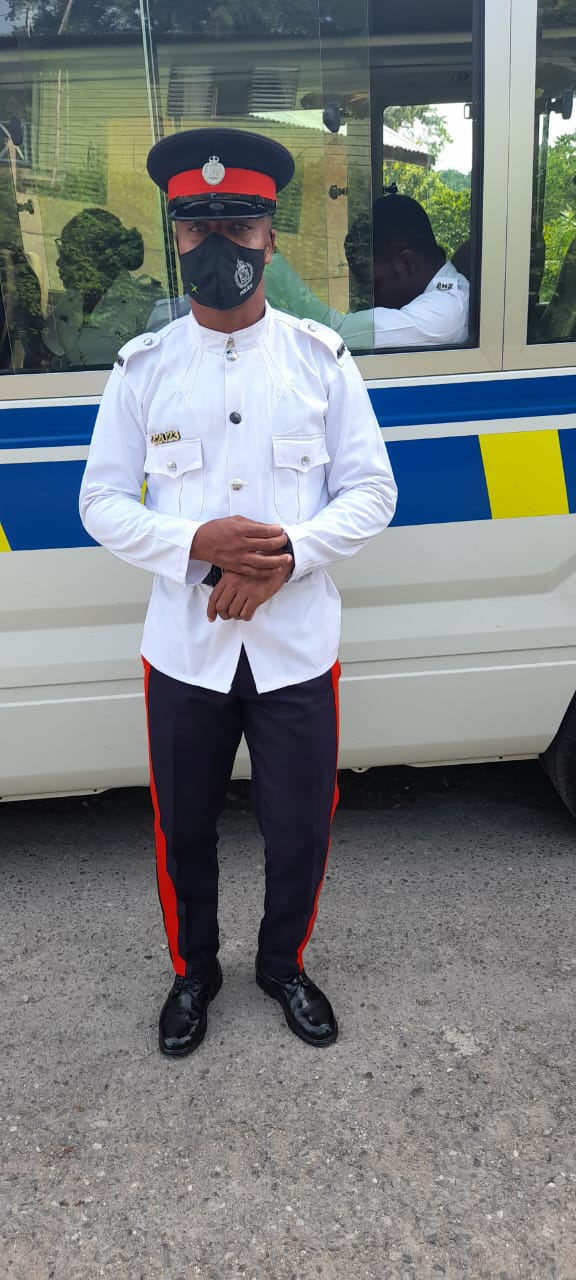
A constable of the Jamaica Constabulary Force in ceremonial uniform.

=== Ranks ===
There are 11 ranks in the JCF. They are (in order of highest to lowest):

- Commissioner (one laurel wreath and one crown on each shoulder strap)
- Deputy Commissioner (one laurel wreath and two stars on each shoulder strap)
- Assistant Commissioner (one laurel wreath on each shoulder strap)
- Senior Superintendent (one crown and one star on each shoulder strap)
- Superintendent (one crown on each shoulder strap)
- Deputy Superintendent (three stars on each shoulder strap)
- Assistant Superintendent (two stars on each shoulder strap)
- Inspector (two metal bars on each shoulder strap)
- Sergeant (three chevrons on right sleeve or three metal Chevrons on each shoulder strap)
- Corporal (two chevrons on right sleeve or two metal Chevrons on each shoulder strap)
- Constable (No emblem)
- District Constables (No emblem)

=== Uniform ===
In 2021, the Commissioner of Police, Antony Anderson, announced that the working uniform would be redesigned to accommodate equipment such as body cameras. Officers began being issued with the new uniforms in 2023.

== Training ==
The Police Academy of Jamaica opened in 1983 at Twickenham Park, St. Catherine. It was based on the old campus of the Jamaica School of Agriculture. The Police Academy was refurbished and reopened in 1997. In 2014, the National Police College of Jamaica was established following a merger of the Police Academy, the Jamaica Constabulary Staff College, the Caribbean Search Centre, the Firearm and Tactical Training Unit, and the Driving School, which all operated independently at Twickenham Park.

== Equipment ==
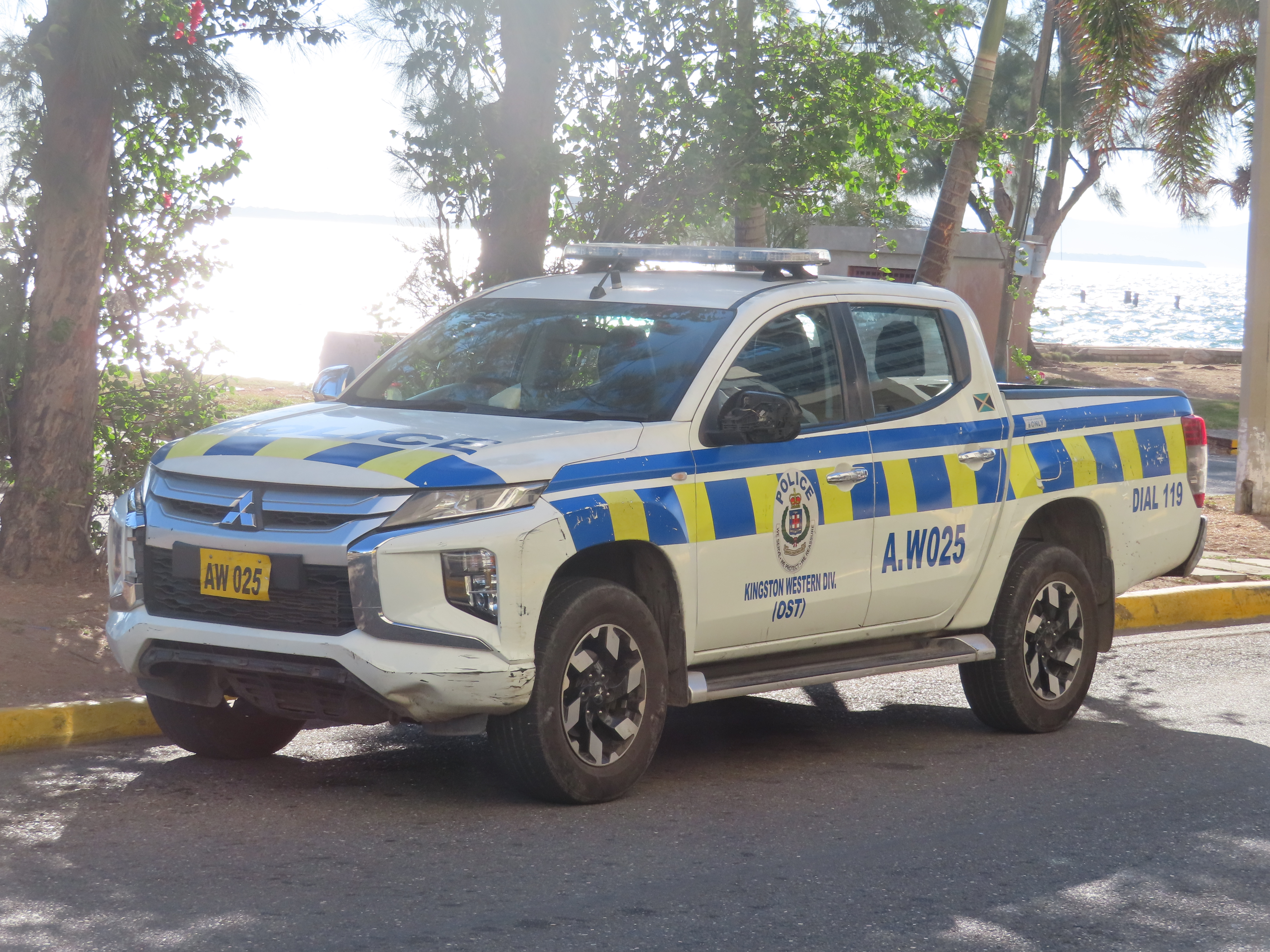
A Mitsubishi L200 pickup truck of the Jamaica Constabulary Force.

=== Vehicles ===
In 2020, the JCF received 107 Mitsubishi L200 pickup trucks and Mitsubishi Outlander compact crossover SUVs.

=== Personal equipment ===
JCF officers are equipped with batons, pepper spray, and handcuffs. In September 2006, the government approved a contract to get 600 ballistic helmets, 1,500 bullet proof vests, and riot shields for the Jamaica Constabulary Force (JCF). In 2013, the Jamaica Constabulary force received 20 motor vehicles, 500 ballistic vests, and 500 tactical uniforms from the United States government. In September 2021, International Organization for Migration (IOM) and the European Union (EU) donated binoculars, camcorders, night vision goggles, key chain voice recorders, digital voice recorders, mini keychain video cameras, hidden camera glasses, and flexible waterproof tripods to JCF. In 2022, Jamaica Constabulary Force received three laptop computers, cell phones, a printer, and printer cartridges from the IOM and EU to that was used to help combat human trafficking on the island. In 2022, the JCF received video cameras, monitors and some software from the Pan American Health Organization (PAHO) which was employed in the JCF’s ‘Enriching Your Health and Wellness’ initiative, that was run by the organization’s Medical Services Branch (MSB). In 2023, the JCF received 3,000 e-ticket machines.

== Controversies ==
The JCF has been accused of carrying out extrajudicial killings. In 2003 the Crime Management Unit (CMU), headed by the controversial Reneto Adams, was disbanded following allegations that it was "Jamaica's version of Dirty Harry". Mark Shields, then of Scotland Yard and later Deputy Police Commissioner of the JCF, was brought in from London to investigate; Adams was acquitted of shooting four people in an alleged extrajudicial execution.

In a climate of gang warfare cops with a record of killing gangsters such as Keith "Trinity" Gardner (noted for shooting several members of the Stone Crusher gang) and Cornwall "Bigga" Ford ( who was on the scene at the alleged killing of seven 15–20-year-old youths in Braeton in 2001) became folk heroes. The police team was searching for suspects who had killed a teacher in cold blood, and a policeman a few months earlier.

Per capita killings by the JCF are among the highest in the world. With a population of less than three million, police killed 140 people each year in the 1990s—five times the death rate in 1990s South Africa. Current rates may be as many as 300 per year. This makes Jamaica's police force "among the deadliest in the world".

On 31 July 2010, three policemen were arrested after they were filmed beating (and then shooting to death) an unarmed murder suspect, Ian Lloyd, in Buckfield, St. Ann; Lloyd was lying on the ground, writhing and apparently helpless. The footage was shown on TVJ television news 30 July 2010. Initial police reports were at variance with the actions shown in the amateur-video footage later released. The officers involved in the killing were acquitted due to an inability to present the maker of the video for court to authenticate it for evidentiary purposes.

== See also ==
- Island Special Constabulary Force
- Jamaica Rural Police Force (District Constable)
- Jamaica Police Federation
- Crime in Jamaica
- List of Law Enforcement agencies
