= Island Special Constabulary Force =

Island Constabulary Force
- Motto: We Serve, Protect and Reassure

Agency overview
- Formed: 1904

Jurisdictional structure
- Legal jurisdiction: Jamaica

Operational structure
- Sworn members: approx. 2,000 officers
- Agency executives: Owen Ellington, Commissioner of Police; James Golding, Commandant

Facilities
- Stations: approx. 20 head stations

Website
- Official website

The Island Special Constabulary Force (ISCF) was the first reserve to the Jamaica Constabulary Force (JCF) until both forces got the green light to merge in May 2014. Approximately fifty eight percent (58%) of the personnel were deployed in Kingston and St. Andrew. Establishment of the ISCF was 2,091 members, but the most current strength was 1,446. James Golding served as the last head of the Island Special Constabulary Force (ISCF).

== History ==
The Island Special Constabulary Force was established in 1950 as part of the police auxiliary forces. It was organised on similar lines to the Jamaica Constabulary Force, with officers and sub-officers attached to each police division. It was considered the first police reserve of Jamaica and had 1,037 all ranks in 1960. The ISCF was led by a commandant, who was responsible to the commissioner of police, and each area had its own assistant commandant. Each police division was home to a company.

== Motto ==
I Integrity and discipline in all my action.

S Satisfaction and proficiency in all my works and deeds.

C Courtesy to whom I encounter.

F Flawless action in service to my God, my country and my fellow men.

== Role ==
The ISCF members supplemented the regular force in all facets of policing including the detection and investigation of major breaches of the Road Traffic Act.

Some of their other roles included:

Security Keeping public security.

Maintaining public order.

Securing public events, rallies and holidays.

Traffic control Coordinating emergency services Police and community Handling civilian complaints.

Providing ceremonial escorts to the Governor General, the Prime minister and foreign ambassadors on state functions.

NB. The I.S.C.F. and the J.C.F had similar mandate.

== History ==
The history of the Special Constabulary dates back as far as 1904. At that time, under the power and authority of the Constables (Special) Law of 1904, two Justices of the Peace could appoint "so many as they may think fit of the householders or other persons residing in such parish and are willing to be appointed Special Constables, to act as Special Constables for such time, and in such manner as to the said Justice".

Special Constables then were given minimal tasks to assist the Jamaica Constabulary Force (JCF), also called the Regular Force, in the preservation of peace and good order. Special Constables received no formal training and there was no hierarchical structure. They operated under the orders of the Justice of Peace who appointed them, unless or until an officer or sub-officer of the JCF was present to take command.

In 1950, a new act was constituted and passed in parliament establishing the Island Special Constabulary Force as a permanent body (Law 18 of 1950).

== Organisational units ==
There were only a few organisational units within the ISCF. However ISCF members worked in most sections of the JCF.

Here are a few of ISCF Units:

Commandant Office

Administration and Support

Credit Union

Canine Unit

Agro and Environmental Patrol Duties

Special Branch

Mobile Reserve

Court Duties

Special Operations Unit

Traffic Headquarters

== Rank structure ==
There were 9 ranks in the ISCF. They are (In order of highest to lowest):

- Commandant (Mr. Osmond Bromfield, since 1 June 2004: one crown and two stars on each shoulder strap)
- Deputy Commandant (one crown and one star on each shoulder strap)
- Asst. Commandant (one crown on each shoulder strap)
- Commanders (three stars on each shoulder strap)
- Asst. Commanders (two stars on each shoulder strap)
- Inspectors (two metal bars on each shoulder strap)
- Special Sergeants (three chevrons on right sleeve)
- Special Corporals (two chevrons on right sleeve)
- Special Constables (no badge assigned)

== Badges of ranks ==
=== Gazetted ranks ===
Rank	Commandant	Deputy Commandant	Assistant Commandant
Insignia			

Rank	Commander	Assistant Commander
Insignia		

=== Non-gazetted ranks ===
Rank	Inspector	Sergeant	Corporal	Constable
Insignia				No badges assigned

== Uniform ==
The uniform for the ranks of Constables to Sergeant was:

Blue serge trousers with blue seams down each seam and a white and blue striped short-sleeved shirt.

The uniform for the ranks of Inspector to Commandant was:

Khaki shirt and pants, with shoulder straps along with the assigned badges.

== Hat ==
The hat for the ranks of Constables to Inspector was:

Black hat, with blue stripes around the top.

The hat for the ranks of Assistant Commander to Commandant was:

Black hat, with black stripes around the top.

== Training ==
Recruit of the Island Special Constabulary Force were trained at the Jamaica Police Academy Up park Camp, Kingston 5. Firearm and Tactical training is done at Jamaica Police Academy Twichenham Park, Spanish Town, St. Catherine. Recruits would undergo the minimum of at least 20 weeks basic training, where there will be given 2 examinations along with 12 practicals. Recruits had to be successful in examinations given in order to graduate.

Students would undergo one week practicum by visiting various stations and courts to get a knowledge of the job.

The Island Special Constabulary force had a clearly defined Basic Training Syllabus, which demands the highest level of discipline, integrity, ethics and professionalism.

== Merger with the JCF ==
On 4 March 2014 the Government reported that the Cabinet had approved a merger of the JCF and the ISCF. The merging of the two forces was recommended by the Wolfe Report of 1991 and five separate reports and studies since. The Special Constabulary Force Association (SCFA) was seeking to challenge the merger of the Island Special Constabulary Force (ISCF) and the Jamaica Constabulary Force (JCF). However, on 1 May 2014 Justice Bertram Morrison of the Supreme Court has struck out the application. The decision meant that the Government can go ahead with the merger. On 2 May 2014 the police high command of the JCF issued new regulation numbers to the former ISCF members and ordered the issuing of JCF shoulder flashes and "red seam" materials to these members.

== See also ==
- Jamaica Constabulary Force
- Jamaica Rural Police Force (District Constable)
- Jamaica Police Cadet Corps
