= The Enchanted Gardens, Jamaica =

Resort in St. Ann, Jamaica

The Enchanted Gardens
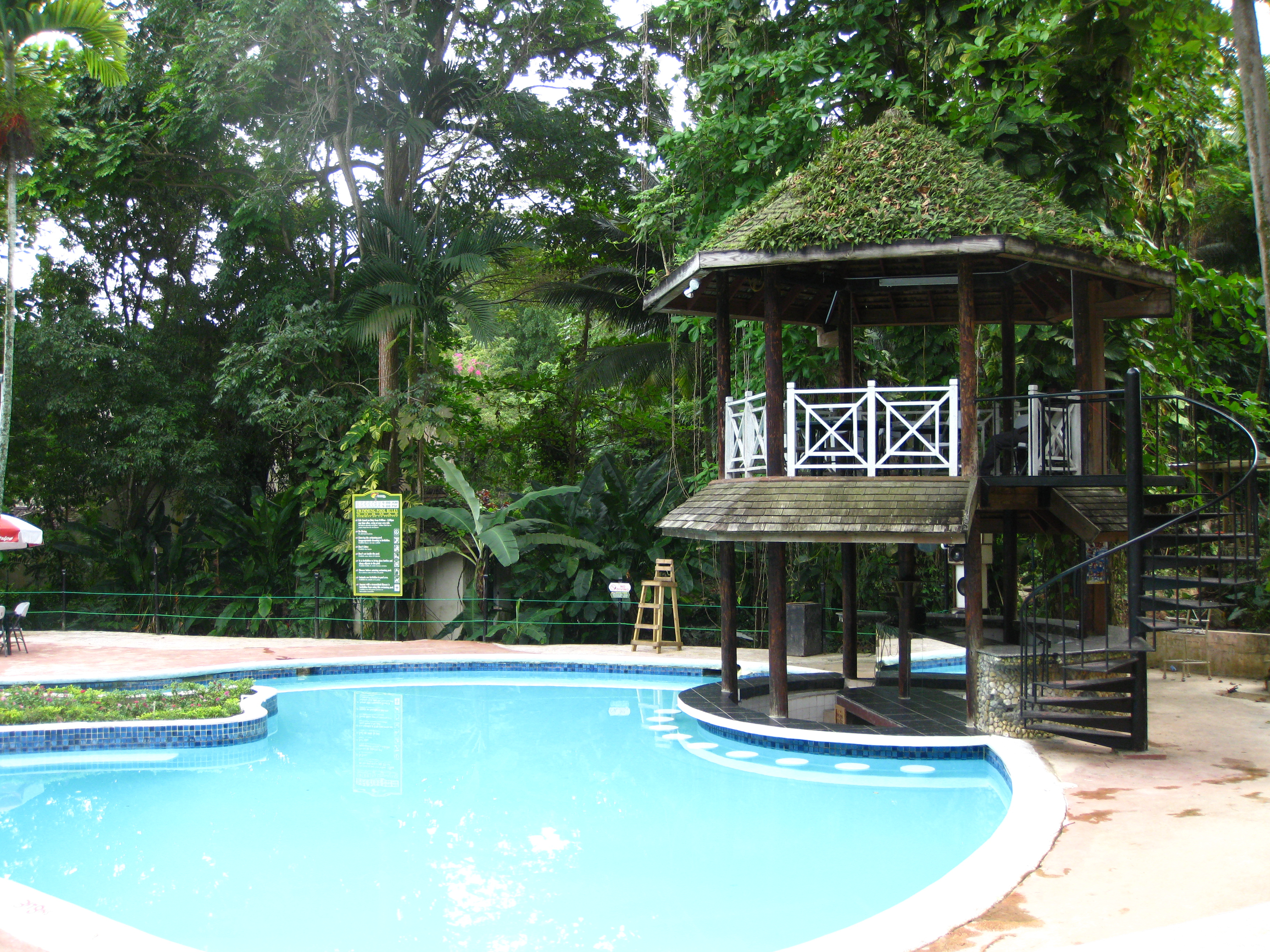
- The swim-up bar at the Enchanted Gardens in 2010.

- Location within Jamaica

General information
- Location: Ocho Rios, St. Ann, Jamaica
- Coordinates: 18.4026641°N 77.1109074°W
- Closed: ~2001
- Owner: Jamaican Redevelopment Foundation

The Enchanted Gardens is a resort near Ocho Rios in St. Ann, Jamaica. It is located in a natural river gorge with 14 waterfalls on 8 hectares (20 acres) of land. There is a nature walk with a wide variety of local plants and jungle like atmosphere. There is also an exotic aviary featuring rare birds, scenic ponds and a seawater aquarium.

The resort was originally owned by former Prime Minister Edward Seaga. It was forced to close shortly after 9-11 because of debt and tax issues.

An injunction barring the sale of the Enchanted Gardens was lifted in September 2008, allowing the property to be put back on the market by its current owner the Jamaican Redevelopment Foundation. This is the third time it has been put up for sale but the first without an injunction. It is expected that it will be sold by July 2009.

== See also ==
- List of hotels in Jamaica
