= Jamaica Rural Police Force =

Jamaica Rural Police Force (District Constable)
- Abbreviation: JRPF, DCF
- Motto: Serve, Protect and Reassure

Agency overview
- Employees: 1475

Jurisdictional structure
- General nature: Civilian police

Operational structure
- Elected officer responsible: Dr. Matthew Smith Barret, PhD, Commissioner

Facilities
- Stations: 189

Website
- Site

The Jamaica Rural Police Force (JRPF), also known as the District Constable (D.C.), is an auxiliary police force that supports the Jamaica Constabulary Force. District constables are appointed by the Commissioner of Police and are attached to a specific police station. Both men and women can serve can be chosen to work as a district constable. Like police officers in the Jamaica Constabulary Force, officers in the Jamaica Rural Police Force have authority in all areas in Jamaica.

== Role ==
District Constables no longer just perform community policing and patrolling the local communities they are found in every department of the Jamaica Constabulary performing police duty just like a regular constable, long gone are the days where District Constable are only assigned to community in order to decrease the amount of crime that happens or just a b auxiliary to the JCF. District Constables often reside in one of the communities that is part of the area they are responsible for. The only difference between a JCF constable and District Constable is that one can go up in rank and the other remains.

As of March 2024, the JRPF was estimated to have around 1,325 officers. District Constables are paid $147,000 monthly.

== Uniform ==
Since 2009, Jamaica Rural Police Force officers are allocated uniforms. Men wear a light blue shirt and dark blue pants, while women wear a light blue blouse and a dark blue skirt. The blouses and shirts have the Jamaica Constabulary District Constable crest on them.

== Training ==
Individuals recruited into the Jamaica Rural Police Force undergo 4–6 weeks of basic training at the Jamaica Police Academy, that is located in Twickenham Park, Spanish Town, St. Catherine.

District Constables training is composed of:

- Law education
- Policing methods
- Community policing
- Firearms education
- Defense strategies

== See also ==
- Island Special Constabulary Force
- Jamaica Constabulary Force
- Jamaica Police Cadet Corps
- Jamaica Defence Force
