= Round Hill Hotel and Villas =

Hotel in Hopewell, Jamaica

Round Hill

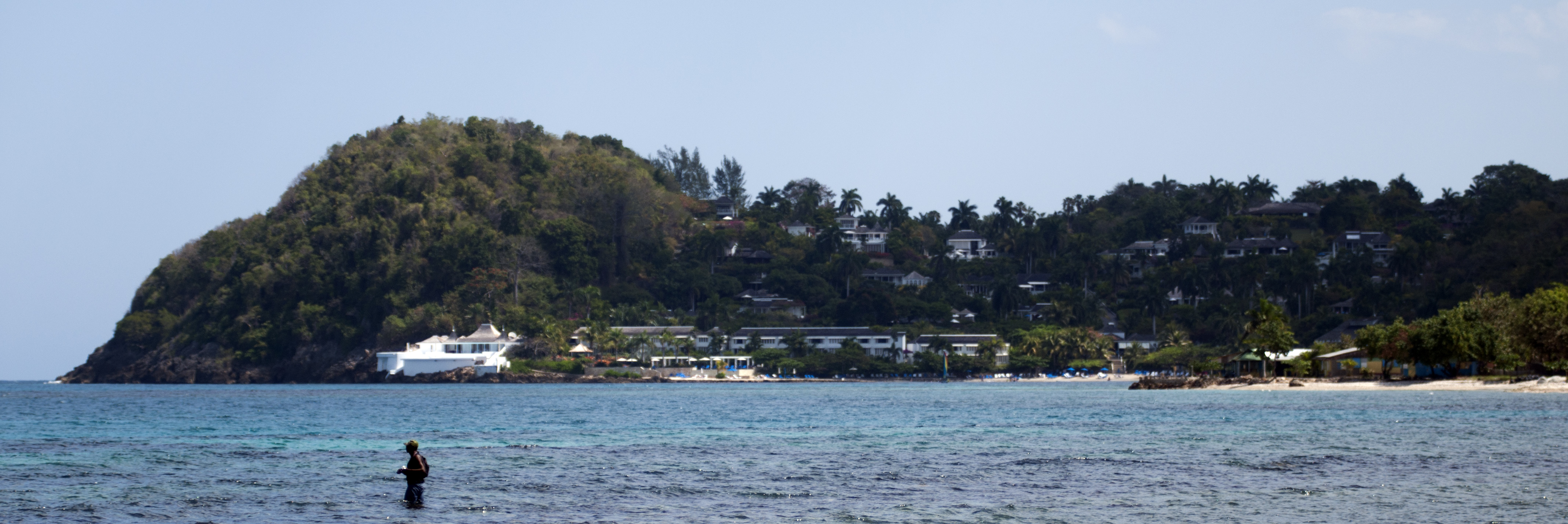
- Interactive map of the Round Hill area

General information
- Coordinates: 18.45871°N 78.01141°W
- Opening: 1952

Website
- www.roundhill.com

The historic Round Hill Hotel and Villas resort near Montego Bay in Hopewell, Hanover, Jamaica opened in 1952. It is located on a 100-acre (40 ha) peninsula and has entertained many celebrities and politicians including John F. Kennedy, Ralph Lauren, Paul Newman and Bob Hope. Ian Fleming was a frequent guest at Round Hill during his time in Jamaica.

== History ==
Round Hill was conceived by John Pringle and Liz Pringle (nee Liz Benn) as a private haven for celebrities. Twenty-nine acres of the estate's land were set aside for the resort. Investors supplied money to build a hotel, and built their own cottages on the site. Shareholders have included Noël Coward, Adele Astaire, Bill Paley, Oscar Hammerstein, Francis H. McAdoo, and Clive Brook. Regular guests included Princess Margaret, Grace Kelly and Clark Gable. Cole Porter regularly sang in the bar. Oscar Hammerstein wrote The Sound of Music here. John and Jackie Kennedy spent their honeymoon in Villa 10.

Round Hill has been host to the Sugar Cane Carnival, a fundraising event for a Jamaican charity, for over 50 years.

== In popular culture ==
Scenes from the American movie How Stella Got Her Groove Back were filmed in Cottage 11.

A collection of Jonathan Routh paintings is on display throughout the property. Jonathan stayed at Round Hill frequently and painted scenes depicting Round Hill.

Scenes from In Like Flint starring James Coburn were filmed at the hotel in the summer of 1966.

Round Hill was featured on the finale of The Amazing Race 7 with the final three teams finishing the first half of the episode at Villa 16.

== See also ==
- List of hotels in Jamaica
