= Chris Blackwell =

English-Jamaican record producer (born 1937)

The Honourable Chris Blackwell OJ
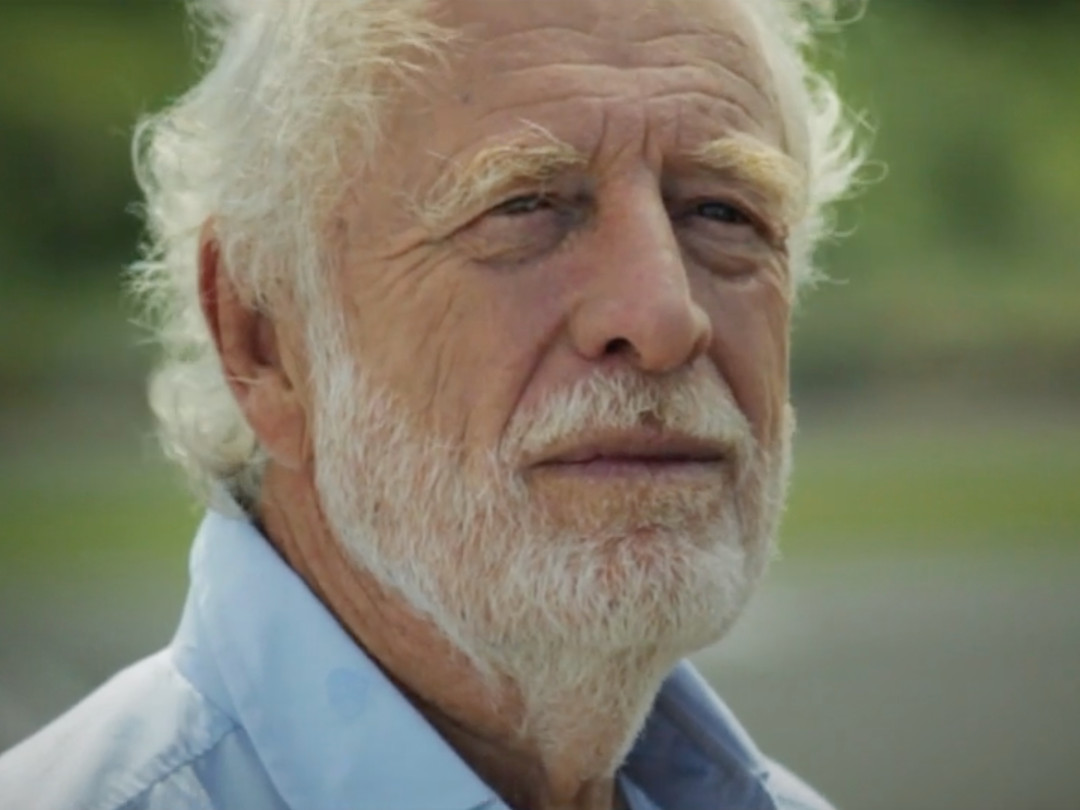
- Blackwell in 2015

Background information
- Born: Christopher Percy Gordon Blackwell; 22 June 1937 (age 89); Westminster, London, England
- Genres: Rock; reggae
- Occupation: Record producer
- Years active: 1959–present
- Website: islandoutpost.com

Christopher Percy Gordon Blackwell OJ (born 22 June 1937) is a Jamaican-British former record producer and the founder of Island Records, which has been called "one of Britain's great independent labels". According to the Rock and Roll Hall of Fame, to which Blackwell was inducted in 2001, he is "the single person most responsible for turning the world on to reggae music." Variety describes him as "indisputably one of the greatest record executives in history."

Having formed Island Records in Jamaica on 22 May 1959 when he was nearly 22, Blackwell was among the first to record the Jamaican popular music that eventually became known as ska. Returning to Britain in 1962, he sold records from the back of his car to the Jamaican community. His label became "a byword for uncompromised artistry and era-shaping acts."

Backed by Stanley Borden from RKO, Blackwell's business and reach grew substantially, and he went on to forge the careers of Bob Marley, Grace Jones and U2 among many other diverse high-profile acts. He has produced many seminal albums, including Marley's Catch A Fire and Uprising, Free's Free and The B-52's' self-titled debut album in 1979.

Having sold Island in 1989, Blackwell embarked on ventures in "hotels, real estate, resorts, another record company, rum, and his Island Films released Kiss of the Spider Woman and Stop Making Sense, among others." In 2022, he published a memoir, The Islander: My Life in Music and Beyond.

== Early life ==
Christopher Percy Gordon Blackwell was born on 22 June 1937 in Westminster, London, the son of Joseph Blackwell, an Anglo-Irish member of the family responsible for the Crosse & Blackwell brand, and Blanche Lindo Blackwell, a Costa-Rican-born Jamaican heiress. The family moved to Jamaica soon after his birth where his father became a major in the Jamaica Regiment. His mother's family, the Lindos, were of Sephardic Jewish heritage, originally from Portugal, the family adopted Christianity and became New Christians. His parents divorced when he was 10 years old.

Blackwell spent his childhood in Jamaica, and was sent to Britain to continue his education at Harrow. Deciding not to attend university, he returned to Jamaica to become aide-de-camp to Jamaica's Governor, Sir Hugh Foot. After Foot was transferred to Cyprus, Blackwell left King's House to pursue a career in real estate and other businesses, including managing jukeboxes across the country, which brought him into contact with the Jamaican music community.

In 1958, Blackwell was sailing off Hellshire Beach when his boat ran aground on a coral reef. The twenty-one-year-old swam to the coast and attempted to find help along the shore in searing temperatures. Collapsing on the beach, Blackwell was rescued by Rasta fishermen who tended his wounds and restored him to health with traditional Ital food. The experience gave Blackwell a spiritual introduction to the Rastafarian lifestyle, and was a key to his connection to the culture and its music.

== Founding Island Records ==
Only in his early 20s, Blackwell formed Island Records in 1959 with a start-up investment of $10,000 (over $112,000 in 2026) provided by his parents. The business took its name from Alec Waugh's novel Island in the Sun. Radio personality Graeme Goodall was his initial business partner. Blackwell received an allowance of £2,000 (over £50,000 in 2026) per year from his mother, which enabled him to have his own apartment at a young age and build on the low revenue that the business was bringing in. Island's debut release was a piano and vocal album by Bermudian jazz pianist Lance Hayward along with his band members, who all played at Half Moon resort in Jamaica as part of the resort's in house band. Blackwell began recording Jamaican popular music in 1959, achieving a number one hit there with Laurel Aitken's "Boogie in my Bones/Little Sheila".

In 1961, Blackwell was a location scout and production assistant for the James Bond film Dr. No (1962). Blackwell's mother, Blanche, had been original Bond author Ian Fleming's mistress. After the film wrapped, producer Harry Saltzman offered him a full-time position. Conflicted between music and film, Blackwell visited a psychic, who told him that he would be successful if he stayed in the music industry. In 1962, Blackwell founded the music publishing company Blue Mountain.

== Commercial breakthrough ==
By the following year, the fledgling record producer had released 26 singles and two albums on Island. Blackwell returned to England that year and continued to grow his business. He began having success with the niche market of Jamaican music, and progressed to bringing in licensed master tapes. One of these contained a performance by Jamaican singer Millie Small (1947–2020), who Blackwell brought over to England. In 1964, he produced and recorded Small's cover of the 1956 Barbie Gaye song "My Boy Lollipop", which was one of the first songs recorded in the ska style. Small's version was a massive hit in 1964, selling over 7 million copies worldwide. It launched Island Records into mainstream popular music, and is acknowledged as the first ska hit. It also made Small an international star at such a very young age.

Blackwell later recalled his decision to license the release to Fontana, a part of Philips.

It was a big hit all around the world, and I really wanted to look after Millie, so I went everywhere with her, which took me into the mainstream of the record industry... This whole new music was emerging.

== Mainstream success ==
After discovering The Spencer Davis Group, featuring Steve Winwood, at a performance in Birmingham, Blackwell focused on the rock acts that Island had signed. Island became one of the most successful independent labels of the 1960s, 1970s, and 1980s with an eclectic range of artists, including Traffic, King Crimson, Emerson, Lake & Palmer, Jethro Tull, Cat Stevens, John Cale, Free, Fairport Convention, Nico, Heads, Hands and Feet, John Martyn, Sparks, Spooky Tooth, Nick Drake, Roxy Music, Grace Jones, Ultravox, Eddie and the Hot Rods, Robert Palmer, Jess Roden, Marianne Faithfull, The Buggles, Etta James, Melissa Etheridge, Julian Cope, The Cranberries, Womack and Womack, U2, and others.

Blackwell also signed artists in non-English speaking countries such as French singer Charlélie Couture whose album, Poèmes rock, was released on Island. "The bigger labels are supermarkets," Blackwell remarked. "I like to think of Island as a very classy delicatessen." Yet Blackwell has admitted to turning down some major names, most notably Elton John, whom he considered too shy to become a successful performer.

Island and Blackwell himself became renowned for a relaxed, nurturing approach. Blackwell showed skill in spotting and creating trends, as well as a gift for finding talent. He had an imaginative flair for marketing, and Island's releases were often packaged in lovingly designed gatefold sleeves. Blackwell has said: "I really believe that if people see something that looks good, subconsciously they'll think maybe there's something going on inside, on the record. There were times when somebody came out with a cover which was actually better than the record itself, so I'd have to send them back to remake the record."

In 1968, Blackwell was the first record executive to offer a distribution deal to the newly formed Led Zeppelin. Zeppelin manager Peter Grant reneged on the handshake deal.

Island Records was also the first distribution home for Trojan Records, Chrysalis Records, Bronze Records, Stiff Records, Virgin Records, ZTT, Gee Street Records and the American Labels Shelter Records whose roster included Tom Petty and the Heartbreakers, J.J. Cale and Phoebe Snow and also Sue Records, who produced Jimmy McGriff, The Soul Sisters and Ike and Tina Turner.

== Toots and the Maytals ==
Toots and the Maytals introduced the term "reggae" in song with their single "Do the Reggay" (1968). Having signed Bob Marley, Blackwell added Toots and the Maytals to his roster, and had the final word in their lineup. In November 2016, Jackie Jackson described the formation of the group in a radio interview for Kool 97 FM Jamaica. Accompanied by Paul Douglas and Radcliffe "Dougie" Bryan in studio, Jackson explained,

We were talking about reggae is going international now. We kept on meeting and he (Blackwell) decided that the backing band that back all of the songs, the recording band, should be the Maytals band... And then we hit the road in 1975...we were the opening act for the Eagles, Linda Ronstadt, and Jackson Browne. We were the opening act for The Who for about two weeks.

The first Toots and the Maytals album released and distributed by Island Records was Funky Kingston. Music critic Lester Bangs described the album in Stereo Review as "perfection, the most exciting and diversified set of reggae tunes by a single artist yet released." As Blackwell says, "Toots and the Maytals were unlike anything else...sensational, raw and dynamic." Blackwell had a strong commitment to the band, describing Toots as "one of the purest human beings I've met in my life, pure almost to a fault." Blackwell appeared in the 2011 BBC documentary Reggae Got Soul: The Story of Toots and the Maytals which told the "untold story of one of the most influential artists ever to come out of Jamaica."

== Bob Marley ==
One of Blackwell's achievements was bringing Bob Marley & The Wailers to the attention of international audiences. Without a signed contract, Blackwell advanced money to The Wailers for their first Island album, displaying the trust which stemmed from his 1958 beach rescue by Rastas.

Excerpt from an interview of Winston Grennan by Carter Van Pelt:

Chris Blackwell say, 'Yeah, Yeah, Yeah. I give them the money to make this record.' But at that time they was forming the band. Bob (Bob Marley) came to me, figure it was me, Gladdy, Winston Wright, Jackie and Hux to be the band. That was the band that Bob did really want, but those guys didn't want to get involved. You know that the situation around Bob was pretty hectic...They turned it down. So right away, I couldn't get involved, because I didn't want to leave the guys...If I leave, I feel it would be a bad vibes."

Blackwell's gesture led to the longterm success of both Marley and the label. Of his experience with Marley, Blackwell has said:

He trusted my instincts, which were that he should go after being a rock star, rather than a star on black American radio. His music was rough and raw and exciting, but all black American music at the time, other than James Brown, was very slick and smooth. Bob trusted me on that, he was as keen as I was.

== More reggae, movies, and Compass Point ==
Blackwell also pioneered reggae to wider audiences the UK and the US beginning in the mid 1970s with releases from Burning Spear, Augustus Pablo, Inner Circle, Dillinger, Black Uhuru, Third World, Aswad, Max Romeo, Justin Hines, Sly and Robbie and Lee Perry. He also formed Mango Records, which featured Jamaican and other artists from the Third World. Mango introduced Salif Keita, Baaba Maal, Gibson Brothers, Angélique Kidjo, King Sunny Adé and many others.

Eventually, Island moved into movies and released The Harder They Come (1972) in the UK, which featured Jimmy Cliff. Produced and directed by fellow Jamaican Perry Henzell, the film marked the first time that Jamaican themes appeared in mainstream cinema. In 1977, Blackwell built Compass Point Studios in Nassau, Bahamas as a recording home for his acts and other artists.

== After Island Records ==
Blackwell sold his stake in Island in 1989, eventually resigning from the company in 1997. In 2009, Blackwell was at the centre of celebrations held in London for Island's fiftieth anniversary.

Each of Blackwell's companies was eventually sold to PolyGram and, in 1999, were part of the Universal Music Group conglomerate, but Blackwell left with a reputation for looking after artists as diverse as Bob Marley, U2, Cat Stevens, Grace Jones, Steve Winwood, Melissa Etheridge, Tom Waits, The Cranberries, Richard Thompson and PJ Harvey.

After selling these companies, Blackwell went on to found Palm Pictures, a media entertainment company with music, film and DVD releases. In the late 1990s, Blackwell merged Palm Pictures with Rykodisc to form RykoPalm, a new operation.

In 2001, Blackwell was inducted into the Rock and Roll Hall of Fame and bestowed the Ahmet Ertegun Award. During his acceptance speech he made a point of thanking Steve Winwood and acknowledged his importance in the development of Island Records. Blackwell said "Steve Winwood was really the cornerstone of Island Records. He's a musical genius and because he was with Island all the other talent really wanted to be with Island."

== Other activities ==
Blackwell has long owned Goldeneye in Oracabessa, the previous home of Ian Fleming, where the author wrote all the James Bond books. Until his death, Fleming was the longtime lover of Blackwell's mother, Blanche. Blackwell developed the property into a community of villas and beach cottages, each with its own private access to the sea, and Goldeneye is considered the most exclusive of the Island Outpost resorts.

Blackwell currently runs Island Outpost, which he set up to operate and market a group of elite resorts in Jamaica, including Strawberry Hill in the Blue Mountains (where Marley recovered after being shot in 1976), The Caves in Negril, and GoldenEye Hotel & Resort in Oracabessa. Island Outpost also owned The Tides and The Marlin in Miami Beach, Florida. The Miami Beach properties including The Tides, The Marlin and The Kent along with several other hotels in Miami Beach and The Bahamas have since been sold.

Blackwell is involved in a number of philanthropic organizations. Among these are Island ACTS, the Oracabessa Foundation, the Oracabessa Bay Fish Sanctuary, the Mary Vinson Blackwell Foundation (established in honour of his late wife to whom he was married from 1998 till 2009), and the Jamaican Conservation Trust.

In 2003, Blackwell launched the Goldeneye Film Festival, which ran for three years. In September that year, Blackwell received the Jamaican Musgrave Medal, which is awarded to Jamaicans who excel in the arts, music and public service. In 2004, the Order of Jamaica was bestowed upon Blackwell for philanthropy and outstanding contribution to the entertainment industry. In April 2009, the UK magazine Music Week named Blackwell the most influential figure in the last 50 years of the British music industry.

Blackwell revisited his family's legacy in Jamaica's banana, coconut, and rum export industries in 2009, when, at the age of 72 years, he introduced his own brand of rum, "Blackwell Black Gold", onto the market. The beverage is made from Jamaican sugar cane, water and yeast, and aged in American oak barrels. Blackwell also produces a Bond-themed, limited-edition rum, featured in the 2021 film No Time to Die. His rum was also featured in the 2023 reality competition show 007: Road to a Million.

== Filmography ==
- Dr. No (1962) – Henchman jumping off dock into water (uncredited)

== Bibliography ==
- Sawyer, Thomas (2005). White Summer Dress (Chapter 19 "Jamaica" page 441-463) (Chapter 20 "Pantrepant" page 464-497). Tandor Press. ISBN 0-9770875-8-1.
- Baugh, Edward (1998). Chancellor, I Present. Mona: Canoe Press. ISBN 978-9768125514.
- Bradley, Lloyd (2001). This is Reggae Music. London: Grove Press. ISBN 978-0-8021-3828-6.
- Childs, Peter; Storry, Mike, eds. (1999). Encyclopedia of Contemporary British Culture. London: Routledge. ISBN 978-0-415-14726-2.
- "Island: The record label which changed the world". The Independent. London. 1 May 2009.
- Perry, Andrew (20 May 2009). "Chris Blackwell interview: Island Records". The Telegraph. London.
- Rock and Roll Hall of Fame (2001). "Chris Blackwell". Rockhall.com.
