= Colin Page =

English cricketer

Personal information
- Full name: John Colin Theodore Page
- Born: 20 May 1930; Mereworth, Kent
- Died: 14 December 1990 (aged 60); Tunbridge Wells, Kent
- Batting: Right-handed
- Bowling: Right-arm medium; Right-arm off break
- Role: Bowler

Domestic team information
- Years: Team
- 1950–1963: Kent
- FC debut: 7 June 1950 Kent v Northants
- Last FC: 17 August 1963 Kent v Somerset County Cricket Club

Career statistics
| Competition | First-class |
|---|---|
| Matches | 198 |
| Runs scored | 818 |
| Batting average | 5.48 |
| 100s/50s | 0/0 |
| Top score | 23 |
| Balls bowled | 30,389 |
| Wickets | 521 |
| Bowling average | 28.72 |
| 5 wickets in innings | 22 |
| 10 wickets in match | 2 |
| Best bowling | 8/117 |
| Catches/stumpings | 74/– |
- Source: Cricinfo, 5 April 2014

John Colin Theodore Page (20 May 1930 – 14 December 1990) was an English cricketer, cricket coach and manager. He played for Kent County Cricket Club as a right-arm bowler between 1950 and 1963. Page played in 198 first-class matches, taking 521 wickets. He was later the manager and coach of Kent and the director of youth coaching at the club and is considered to have been a major factor behind the success of the county team during the 1970s.

== Playing career ==
Page was born at Mereworth in Kent in 1930. He first appeared for Kent's Second XI in 1948, before being taken on by the team as a fast-medium bowler in 1949. He made his senior debut for the team in 1950, and six matches that season were followed by three in 1951, but he was not impressing as a fast bowler. He began to transition to bowling off spin in 1952 and soon broke into the team on a more regular basis, playing 18 matches and taking 61 wickets during the season.

He continued to play regularly for Kent's First XI until 1959 and was awarded his county cap in 1957, although during the winter he worked at a paper mill in Aylesford. (Note: At the time Page played it was common for cricketers to work in other professions during the off season.) He took 12 wickets in a match against Northants in 1954, spun Kent to victory with 6/33 on a rain-affected Lord's pitch in 1955, and took 69 wickets at an average of less than 19 in 1957, including eight wickets in an innings against Warwickshire, his career best innings figures. Although he took 86 wickets in 1958 and 72 in 1959, his Wisden obituary wrote that it "seemed that he had reached his ceiling", and he was offered the position of Second XI captain in 1960.

In this role he was to help nurture talent with the intention that the county might compete for honours in the future. His team won the Second XI Championship three times, and future England internationals Alan Knott, Derek Underwood, Mike Denness and Brian Luckhurst all passed through the team. He played occasionally for the First XI, making 11 appearances between 1960 and 1963, and was still playing Second XI cricket in 1974.

In total Page made 198 first-class appearances, taking 521 wickets at an average of 28.72. He was a poor batsman and scored only 818 runs at an average of 5.48 runs per innings.

== Coaching career and death ==
Wisden called Page's appointment as Second XI captain in 1960 the "turning-point" in his career. The players he captained were the nucleus of the Kent team which won the 1967 Gillette Cup and went on to claim eight one-day cricket trophies during the 1970s. He was particularly instrumental in promoting Brian Luckhurst to the county's First XI, recommending him when an opening became available for a batsman in 1961, and was influential in Luckhurst's recall to the team in 1962 and in his promotion to opening batsman the following season. Luckhurst went on to play almost 500 times for Kent and in 21 Test matches for England.

The team had also won the 1970 County Championship, their first Championships since the period before the First World War, and when Page succeeded Les Ames as Kent's manager in 1975 the team were joint winners of the Championship in 1977 and won the competition outright the following season. According to Paul Farbrace, who coached Kent and the Sri Lanka national cricket team, he favoured man-management rather than expert coaching, although he clashed with Mike Denness soon after becoming manager, leading to Denness leaving the club. In 1981 Page became Kent's Director of Youth Cricket, a role he held until shortly before his death. He lived at Offham and was Chairman of Offham Cricket Club between 1968 and 1971.

Page died in a car crash at Tunbridge Wells in 1990 whilst driving home from a coaching session at Sevenoaks. He was aged 60. A scholarship in his memory is presented to a Kent Academy player each year.
