= Strawberry Hill (hotel) =

Hotel in Jamaica

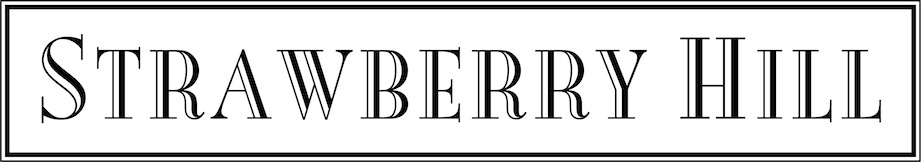

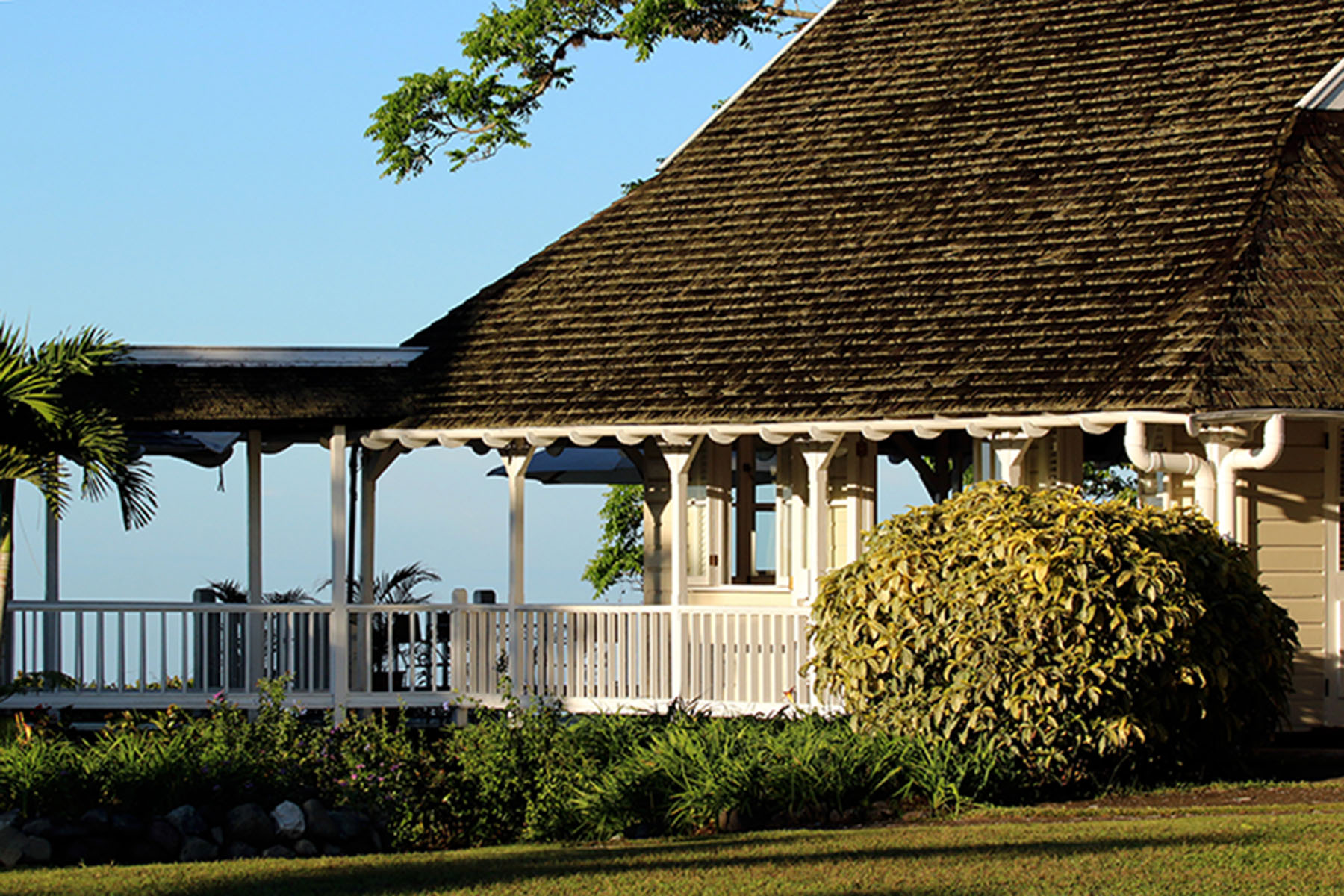
- Interactive map of the Strawberry Hill area

General information
- Location: Blue Mountains
- Coordinates: 18.0523°N 76.7266°W
- Owner: Chris Blackwell
- Management: Island Outpost

Other information
- Number of restaurants: 1

Website
- www.strawberryhillhotel.com

Strawberry Hill is a Jamaican hotel located in the Blue Mountains of Jamaica. It is owned by Chris Blackwell, a philanthropist and entertainment entrepreneur who founded Island Records, Palm Pictures and Island Outpost, a company that owns and operates his boutique hotels.

== Property History ==
Strawberry Hill was named by its former owner Horace Walpole, 4th Earl of Orford, the son of Prime Minister Robert Walpole and cousin of Admiral Lord Nelson. The Royal Family granted Horace the Blue Mountain property in the Crown Colony of Jamaica, in 1780. The Earl discovered that the property's elevation was ideal for growing strawberries and named the property "Strawberry Hill".

After becoming a Foreign Officers’ Naval Hospital in the late eighteenth century, successive owners included prominent families such as the Cargills and the DaCostas until passing to the Muffett family. Chris Blackwell then purchased the property from the Muffett family in 1972.

== Property Layout ==
The property is centered on the restaurant with a number of villas, walking paths and a central infinity pool.

== Celebrity ==
There have been a number of celebrities that have stayed at Strawberry Hill as both a property and a hotel.

Among the famous people who have visited Strawberry Hill:

- Bob Marley
- Admiral Lord Nelson
- Bradley James Richmond

== See also ==
- List of hotels in Jamaica
