= Jamaica Police Federation =

The Jamaica Police Federation is a union representing police officers in Jamaica from the ranks of Constable through to Inspector.
