= Jamaica Pegasus Hotel =

Hotel in Kingston, Jamaica

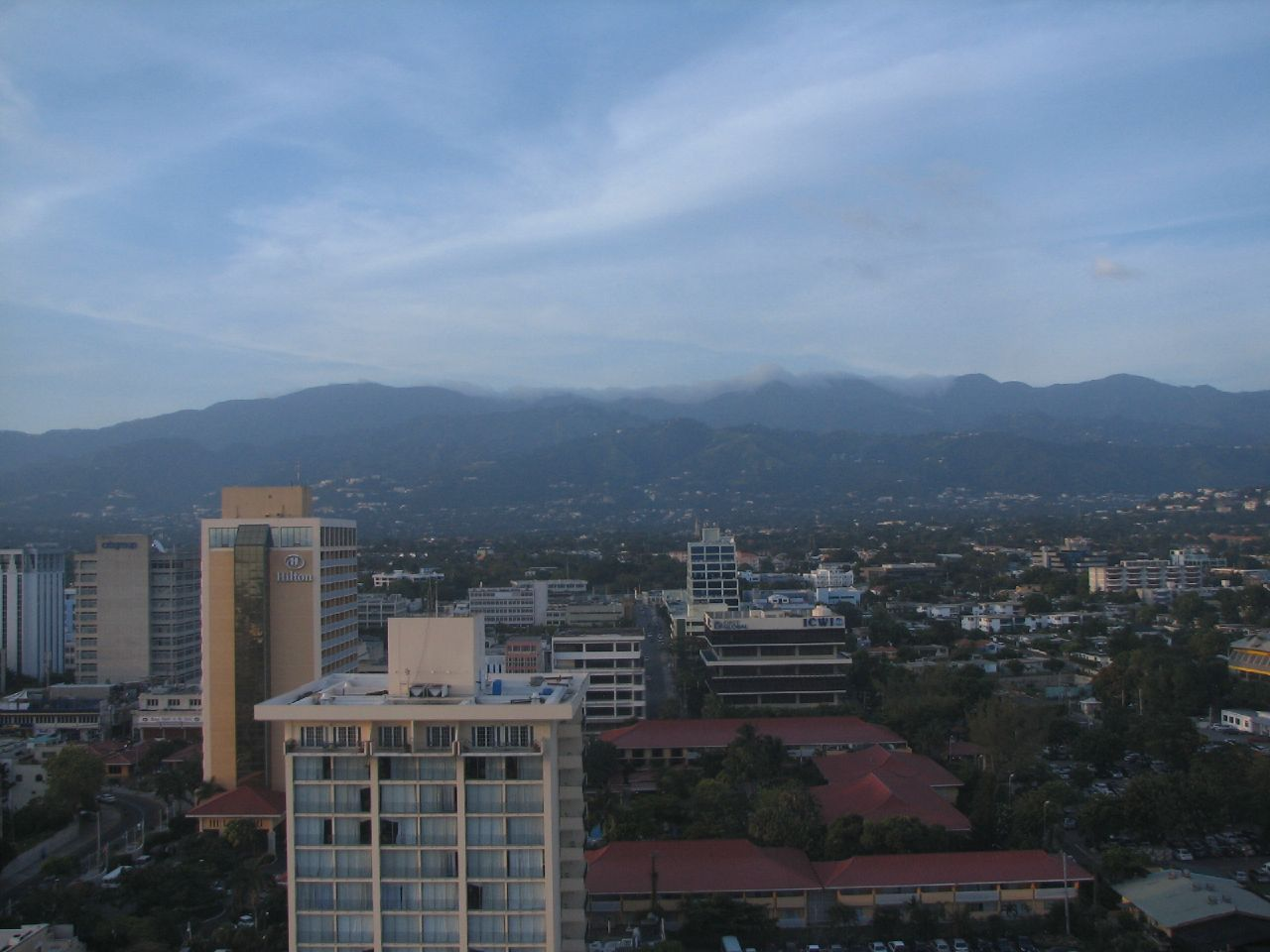
- View of Kingston from the Pegasus Hotel

- Location within Jamaica

General information
- Location: 81 Knutsford Boulevard, Kingston, Jamaica
- Coordinates: 18°0′9″N 76°47′16″W

Other information
- Number of rooms: 300+
- Number of restaurants: 3

Website
- www.jamaicapegasus.com

The Jamaica Pegasus Hotel is a hotel in Kingston, Jamaica, located at 81 Knutsford Boulevard in the financial and business district of the city. A noted landmark, the hotel is 17 stories high.

== Death of Bob Woolmer ==
On 18 March 2007, English Cricketer Bob Woolmer was found dead in his hotel room. The initial autopsy conducted by Ere Seshaiah was inconclusive; however, two days later, Seshaiah released a follow-up report suggesting a suspicious death and possible strangulation. On 22 March Jamaica's deputy police commissioner, Mark Shields, announced that there would be a murder investigation. Jamiacan authorities sought a second opinion, and Home Office pathologist Dr Nat Carey concluded in mid-May that Woolmer was not strangled, a finding that was corroborated by a Canadian pathologist. On June 7, a third assessment, this time from a South African strangulation expert, determined that Woolmer had died of natural causes. The case was officially close one week later.

== Hurricane Melissa ==
In response to Hurricane Melissa, Antiguan and Barbudan students were granted two days of emergency accommodation in the hotel starting from October 25, 2025. After reaching an agreement with the Antigua and Barbuda Students Association and the government of Antigua and Barbuda, this was extended to six days. Over 50 students sheltered at the hotel.

== See also ==
- List of hotels in Jamaica
