= Richard Fortescue (soldier) =

English soldier

Richard Fortescue (died 1655) was an English soldier who fought in the English Civil War and the Anglo-Spanish War (1654–60). He commanded a regiment at the Siege of Santo Domingo in April 1655. He participated in the invasion of Jamaica and, when his commanding officer Robert Venables left Jamaica for England in late July 1655, he took over command of the army in Jamaica. He died three months later in October 1655.
