= Francis Barrington (planter) =

English military officer (died 1660)

Francis Barrington (died 1660) was an officer in the New Model Army who led a regiment involved in the military administration of Jamaica following the English invasion of Jamaica.

Francis was the son of Robert Barrington and grandson of Sir Francis Barrington, 1st Baronet.

He joined the New Model Army and served as a dragoon in Ireland. He gained a commission lieutenant colonel in the expeditionary forces led by Robert Venables sent to the West Indies to seize the Spanish colonies as part of the Western Design. He was second in command of Anthony Buller's regiment at the Siege of Santo Domingo, 1655. Following this defeat he was part of the force which then successfully invaded Jamaica.

Following Buller's departure for England, Barrington became the commanding officer of Buller's regiment. In order to implement the Western Design, the soldiers were put to work developing plantations under the command of their regimental officers. Under his command the regiment started to develop Guanaboa Vale which soon became one of the most prolific plantations on the island.

He was shot by a cavalry man in Jamaica in January 1660. He died a lingering death from the wounds.
