= James Heane (English general) =

English Army general

Governor of Jersey
- In office 1651–1654
- Appointed by: English Council of State
- Preceded by: Sir George Carteret
- Succeeded by: None (Commonwealth of England)

Personal details
- Died: April 1655 Santo Domingo, Hispaniola

Military service
- Allegiance: Commonwealth of England
- Branch/service: New Model Army
- Rank: Colonel
- Battles/wars: English Civil War; Anglo-Spanish War; Western Design; Siege of Santo Domingo †

James Heane (died 1655) was a general serving in the Army of the Commonwealth of England. He was Governor of Jersey (1651–1654). Heane was an ardent Puritan.

On 20 September 1651, the English Council of State appointed Colonel James Heane military commander of a force of 2,200 men commissioned with the task of taking Jersey. The General-at-Sea, Robert Blake, was appointed naval commander with a fleet of twelve warships and a further seventy ancillary ships.

Heane commanded one of the regiments under command of General Robert Venables which took part in the Western Design.

Heane was killed during the Siege of Santo Domingo in April 1655.
