= Western Design =

Cromwellian expedition to the Caribbean

- Part of Anglo-Spanish War (1654–1660)
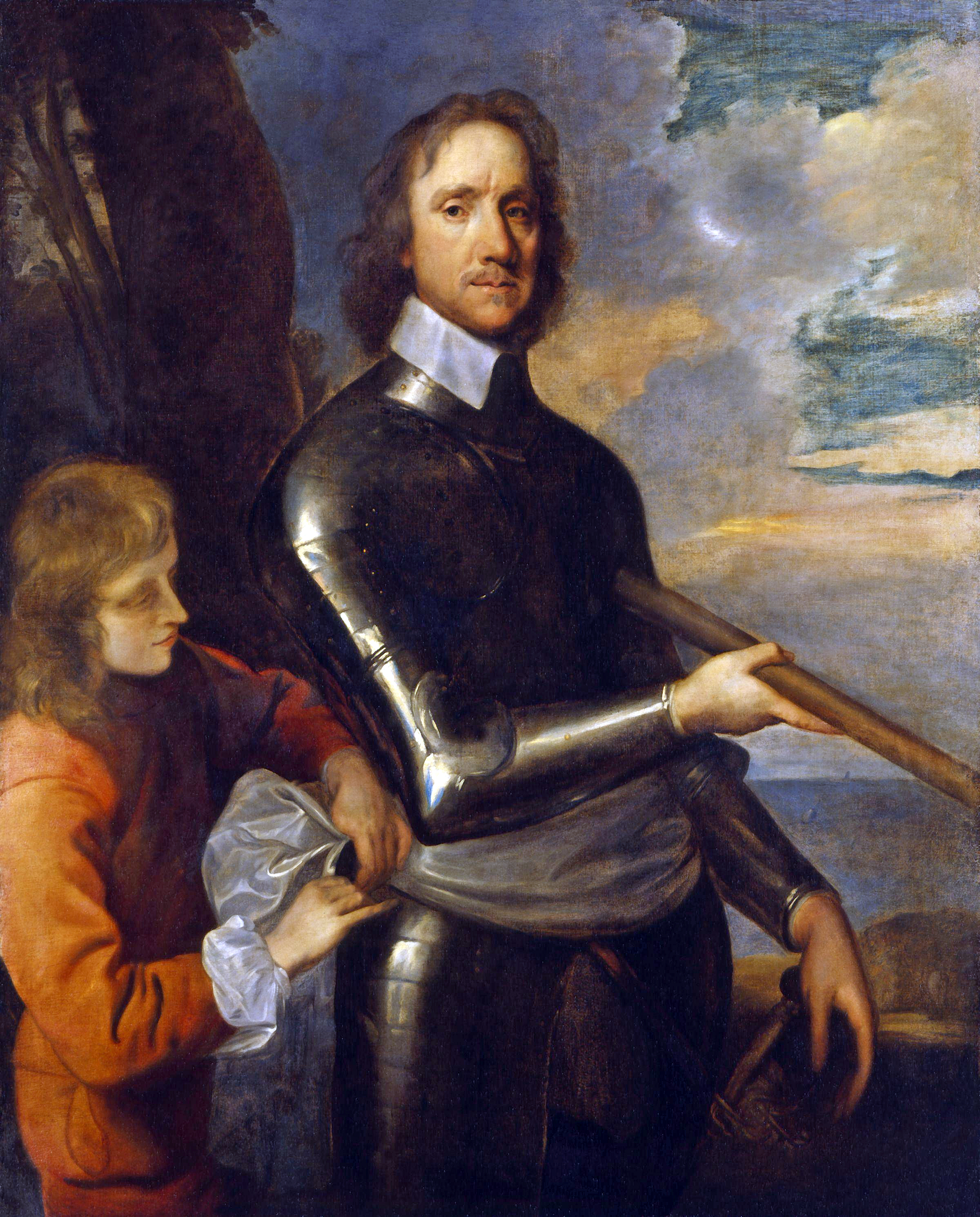
- Oliver Cromwell; the Design was part of an ambitious plan to oust Spain from the Americas
Date	19–27 May 1655
Location	Spanish West Indies
Result	English victory
Territorial changes	Jamaica occupied by England

Belligerents
Spain	England

Commanders and leaders
Juan Ramírez de Arellano; Bernardino de Meneses	William Penn; William Goodsonn; Robert Venables; James Heane †

Strength
2,400 (Hispaniola); 1,500 (Jamaica)	8,000 troops; 30 ships

Casualties and losses
	over 1,000

The Western Design was an English expedition against the Spanish West Indies during the 1654 to 1660 Anglo-Spanish War.

Part of an ambitious plan by Oliver Cromwell to end Spanish dominance in the Americas, the force was short of supplies and poorly trained. Leadership was split between Robert Venables, commander of land forces, and Admiral William Penn; the relationship between the two quickly broke down, and they regarded each other with distrust and suspicion. The attack on Hispaniola was a failure but the English then subsequently took Jamaica and claimed it for the English Commonwealth.

== Background ==
The purpose of the expedition was to attack the Spanish West Indies and secure a permanent base in the Caribbean, allowing English ships to threaten trade routes between Spanish America and mainland Europe. In 1630, the same objective led to the establishment of the Providence Island Company, a Puritan colony off the coast of Nicaragua which was abandoned in 1641.

First discussed by the Council of State in June 1654, the "Design" used significant input from Thomas Gage, who had lived a decade in New Spain as a Dominican friar prior to returning to England and becoming a Protestant. Because of years of residency in the heart of the Spanish empire, he was regarded as an expert on the region. He claimed the Spanish colonies of Hispaniola and Cuba were weakly defended and could easily be seized by a determined force, advice which proved incorrect.

The project was largely driven by Oliver Cromwell, who had been involved in the Providence Island colony. In negotiations that ended the 1652 to 1654 First Anglo-Dutch War, he suggested a union between the Protestant Dutch Republic and Commonwealth of England. Combining the two most powerful European navies would allow them to control trade and dictate terms to the Catholic monarchies of France and Spain; the Western Design would start this process by ousting Catholic Spain from the Americas. The Dutch declined to join the project, but Cromwell proceeded, convinced "Providence" was on his side, a belief that meant its subsequent failure strongly affected him.

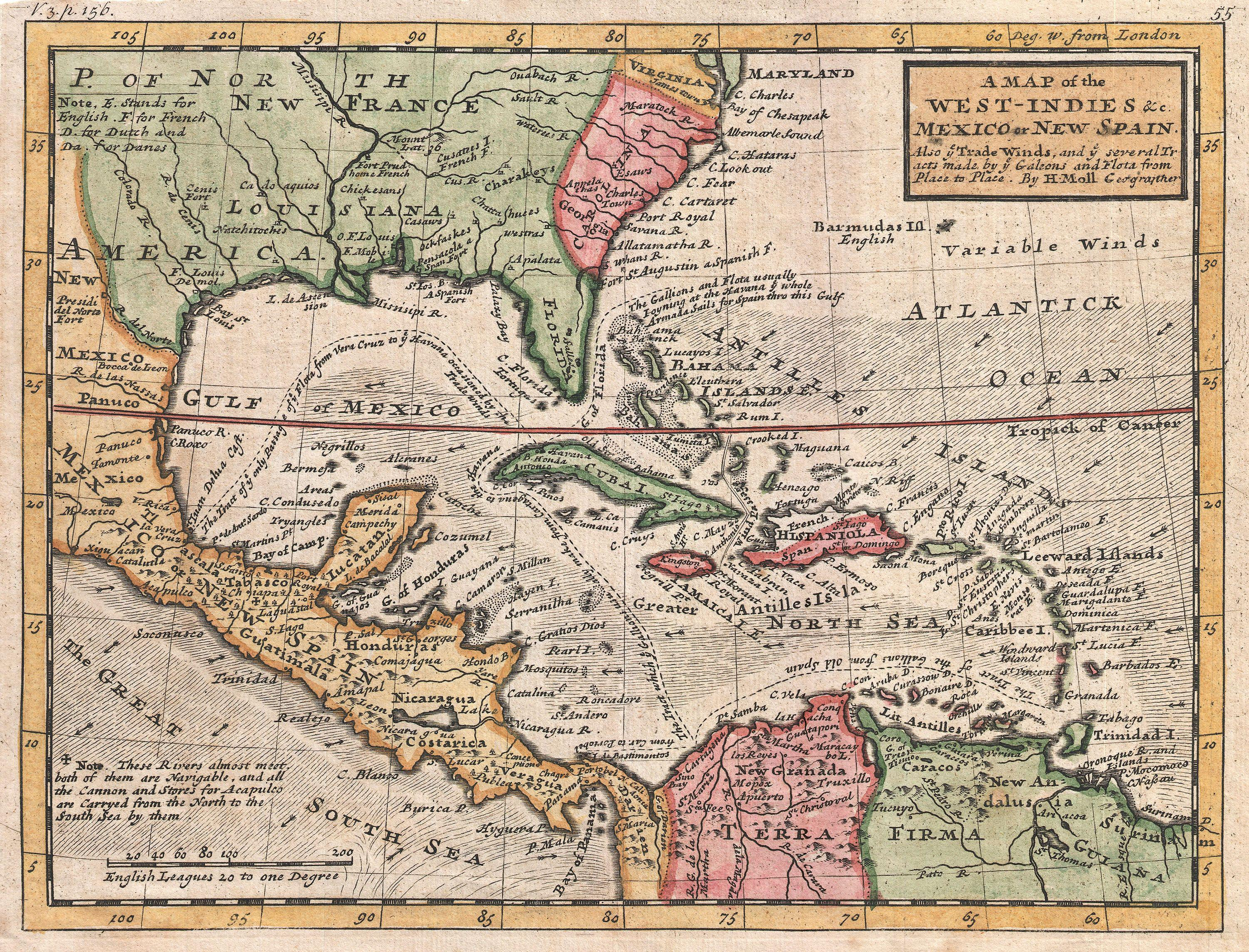
1732 Map of the West Indies and Caribbean

A committee under Cromwell's brother-in-law John Desborough supervised logistics. With the end of the Dutch war, the New Model Army was being reduced and the expedition provided an opportunity to employ surplus troops. However, relatively few were willing to serve in an area notorious for sickness and disease. Of the 2,500 troops who sailed from England, the majority were untrained recruits. They were led by Robert Venables, a veteran of the Wars of the Three Kingdoms recently returned from four years of often brutal campaigning in Ireland. Although well regarded by Cromwell, his complaints about the poor condition of these troops were ignored.

Venables shared command with Admiral William Penn, who had a fleet of eighteen warships and twenty transport vessels, the largest English fleet ever sent to the Caribbean. He too was an experienced and competent officer, but joint command resulted in friction and mutual hostility between the two men. They were accompanied by Daniel Searle, the Governor of Barbados, and two civilian commissioners, Edward Winslow, former Governor of Plymouth Colony, and Gregory Butler, who were to supervise colonisation of the captured lands.

== Expedition ==
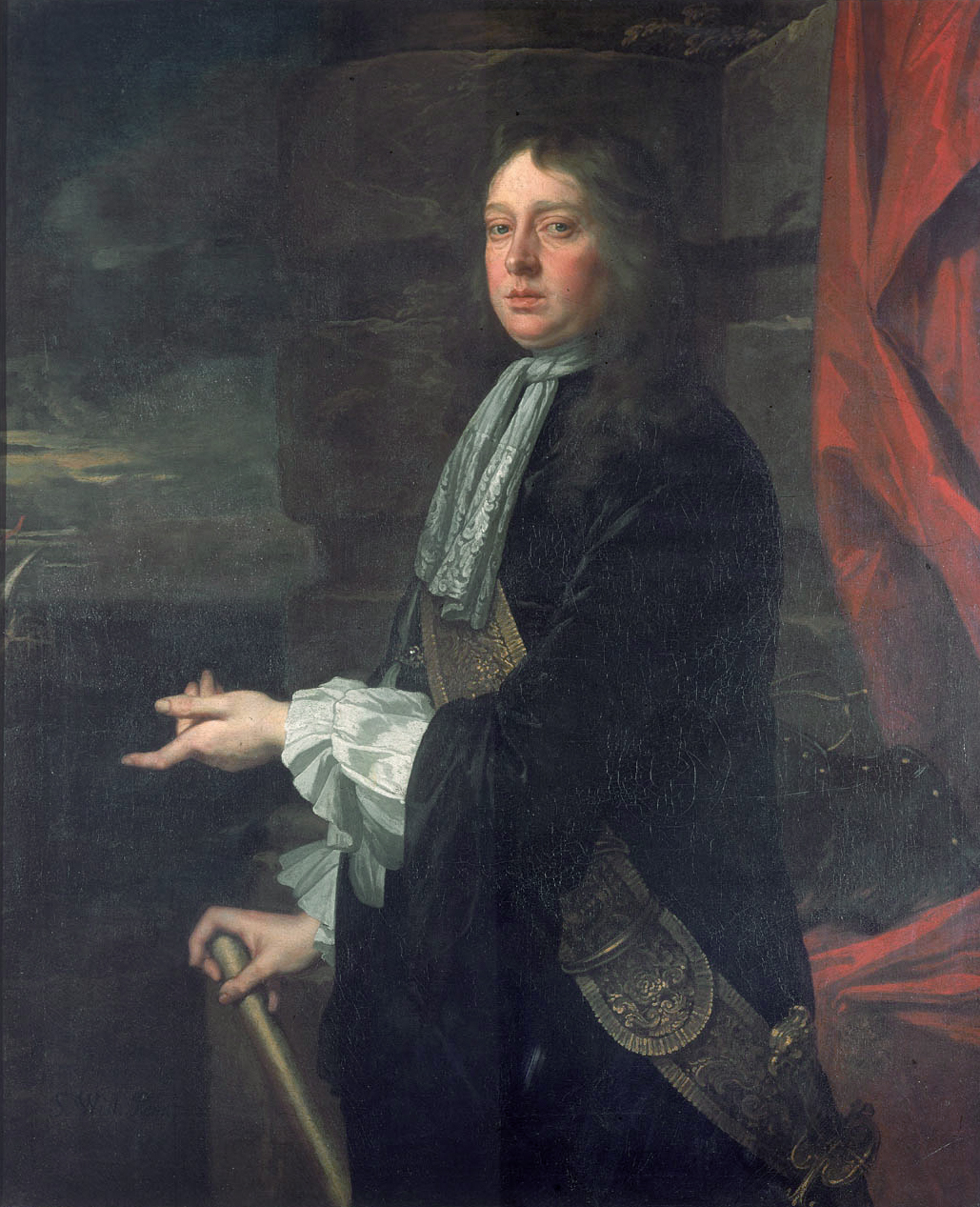
Admiral William Penn, whose shared command with Robert Venables proved disastrous

The fleet left Portsmouth at the end of December 1654 and arrived in Barbados a month later. Between three and four thousand additional troops were raised from volunteers among the indentured servants and freemen in the English island colonies of Barbados, Montserrat, Nevis and St Kitts to make the numbers of the five original regiments up to 1,000 men each and to form a sixth regiment. The troop numbers looked impressive, but they were untrained and badly disciplined. In addition, supplies were running low and joint commanders Penn and Venables were arguing with one another. Morale among the soldiers sank lower still when the civilian commissioners stipulated that they were not to plunder the Spanish colonies but rather to preserve them intact for subsequent English colonisation.

An attack on the main target of Hispaniola, the island now divided between Haiti and the Dominican Republic, was repulsed in April 1655, the English suffering heavy losses from disease. In May, they captured the weakly-defended island of Jamaica, but overall the expedition failed to achieve its goal of undermining Spanish dominance.

== Aftermath ==
Venables and Penn hurried back to England on separate ships hoping to blame the other for the lack of success; they were charged with desertion and dismissed from the military. Although Penn returned to the navy after The Restoration in 1660, this ended Venables' career.

Although the exiled Charles II had agreed in the 1656 Treaty of Brussels to return any territory captured from Spain, following the 1660 Restoration he did not fulfill this pledge and the island was retained as a possession of the crown. For England, Jamaica was to be the "dagger pointed at the heart of the Spanish Empire", although in fact it was a possession of little economic value then. Despite several attempts by the Spanish to recapture Jamaica, they formally ceded the island in 1670 and it remained in British hands for over 300 years until it received independence in 1962.

== Sources ==
- Harrington, Matthew Craig (2004). "The Worke Wee May Doe in the World": the Western Design and the Anglo-Spanish Struggle for the Caribbean, 1654–1655. Florida State University Libraries, Electronic Theses, Treatises and Dissertations (PHD). Florida State University.
- Kupperman, Karen (2007). "Providence Island Company". Oxford Dictionary of National Biography (online ed.). Oxford University Press. doi:10.1093/ref:odnb/95346. (Subscription, Wikipedia Library access or UK public library membership required.)
- Pestana, Carla Gardina (2005). "English Character and the Fiasco of the Western Design". Early American Studies. 3 (1): 1–31. doi:10.1353/eam.2007.0021. JSTOR 23546511. S2CID 145803973.
- Plant, David. "The Western Design 1655". BCW Project.
- Plant, David. "Biography of John Disbrowe". bcw-project.org.
- Venning, Timothy. "Cromwell's Foreign Policy and the Western Design". olivercromwell.org. Cromwell Association.
