= Daniel Searle =

Daniel Searle may refer to:

- Daniel C. Searle (1926–2007), American business executive and philanthropist
- Daniel Searle (governor), English tobacco planter and governor of Barbados, 1652–1660
