= Francis Price (planter) =

English planter in Jamaica (1635–1689)

- Born: 1635
- Died: 1689 (aged 53–54)
- Occupation: Planter

Francis Price (1635 – 1689) was an English planter in Jamaica. He joined the regiment of Anthony Buller, part of Robert Venables' expeditionary force known as the Western Design. He fought at the Siege of Santo Domingo in April 1655. In 1670, Price became the patent holder for Worthy Park, an 840-acre plantation situated at Luidas in Saint John Parish, Jamaica. He also held a patent with his partner, Nicholas Philpott, for the 150 acre plantation in Flamingo Savanna, Saint Catherine Parish, Jamaica.

Francis had three sons, Francis, Thomas and Charles, and a daughter. His grandson, Sir Charles Price (1708–1772) was created a baronet on 16 January 1768.
