= Francis Price =

Francis Price may refer to:

- Francis Price (planter) (1635–1689), English planter in Jamaica
- Francis Wilson Price (1895–1974), missionary of the Presbyterian Church
