= Siege of Santo Domingo (1655) =

Battle of the Anglo-Spanish War

- Part of the Anglo-Spanish War (1654–60)
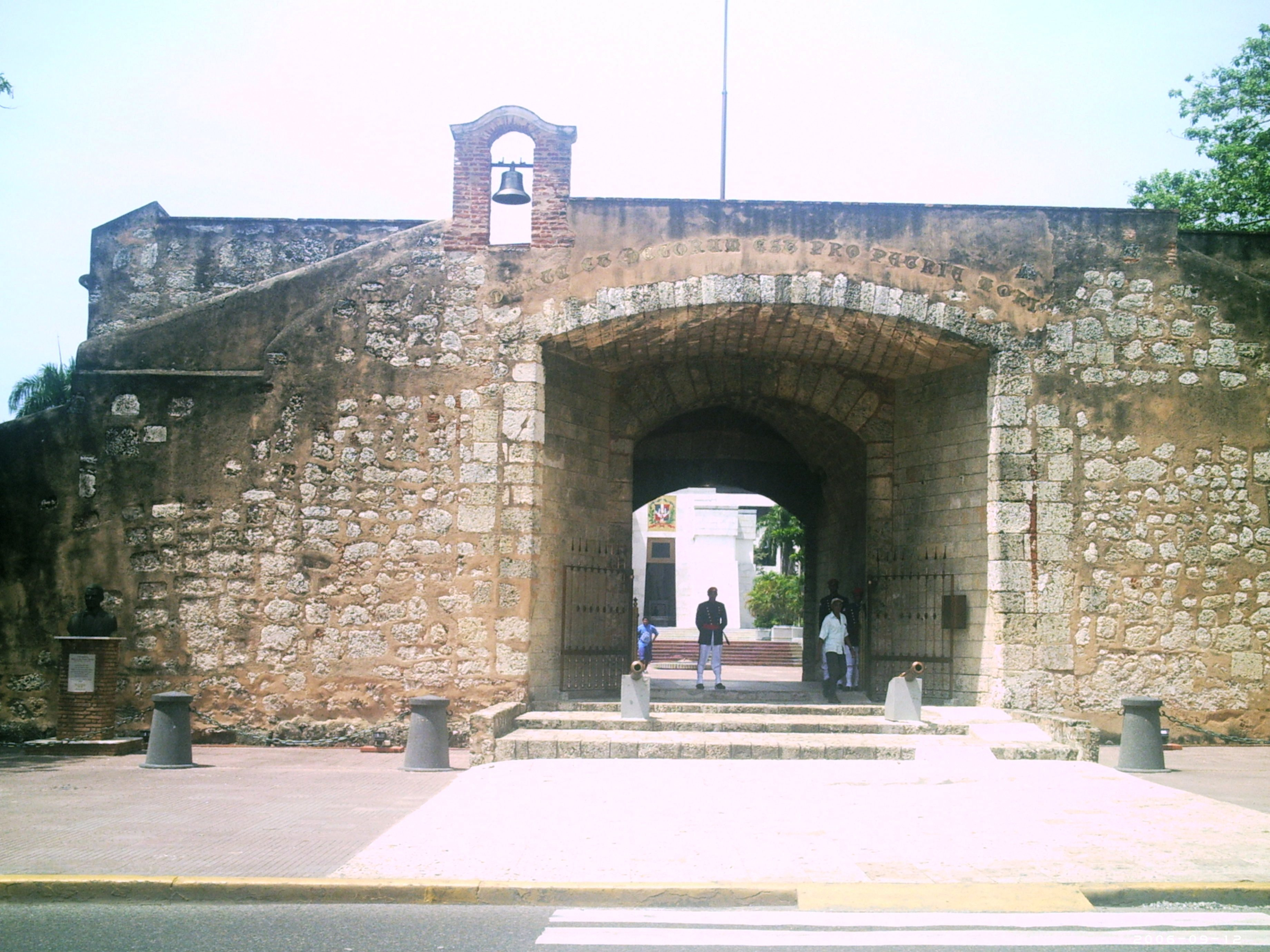
- Puerta del Conde originally named Fort San Genaro.
Date	April 23–30, 1655
Location	Santo Domingo, Hispaniola (present-day Dominican Republic) 18°28′35″N 69°53′36″W
Result	Spanish victory

Belligerents
(Spain) Spanish Empire	Commonwealth of England

Commanders and leaders
(Spain) Bernardino de Meneses	(Commonwealth of England) William Penn (Commonwealth of England) Robert Venables

Strength
2,400 soldiers: 1,300 lancers; 700 regular soldiers; 200 marines; 200 militias	13,120 soldiers: 7,000 marines; 6,000 infantry; 120 cavalry; 34 ships

Casualties and losses
30 dead	~600 killed
- Location within the Dominican Republic Siege of Santo Domingo (1655) (the Caribbean)

The siege of Santo Domingo was fought between April 23, 1655 and April 30, 1655, at the Spanish Colony of Santo Domingo. A force of 2,400 Spanish troops led by Governor Don Bernardino Meneses y Bracamonte, Count of Peñalba successfully resisted a force of 13,120 soldiers led by General Robert Venables and 34 ships under Admiral Sir William Penn of the English Commonwealth.

== Background ==
In 1655 the Commonwealth of England, under Oliver Cromwell, decided to declare war on Spain. Religious fanaticism played a role in this, as the puritans running the Commonwealth loathed the Catholicism of Spain. More practically, England had a large standing army with ambitious commanders and Cromwell wished to occupy them with a successful campaign, preferably far from home. In addition it was believed that war with Spain would be both easy and profitable.

Command of an expedition to the Caribbean to capture Spanish colonies named the "Western Design" was given to General Robert Venables, with Admiral Sir William Penn commanding the naval contingent of 34 ships. Their authority was constrained by two Civil Commissioners whom Cromwell has tasked with ensuring the loyalty of both Venables and Penn. The 13,000 troops sent to the Caribbean were selected for the mission based on which would be least missed due to perceived practical or political weakness. Administrative and financial problems meant that the expedition sailed short of equipment and supplies. It was hoped that the English might take possession of Santo Domingo, Cuba and Puerto Rico.

== Invasion ==
High winds and surf made it difficult for the English to land near their first objective, the city of Santo Domingo. They eventually landed on April 13, 1655. However, the 13,000 Englishmen were put ashore at the mouth of the Nizao River, some thirty miles from the city. It took them four days, short of water, food and military supplies, to make their way to within sight of the city. They were then ambushed and routed by approximately 300 Spanish militiamen. Venables' troops suffered approximately 600 men killed and 400 wounded or taken prisoner. The English fleet carried out an ineffectual attempt to bombard the city into submission, then sailed off to re-embark the army's survivors.

== Aftermath ==
British historian Nicholas A. M. Rodger wrote that "in one afternoon the invincible reputation of the New Model Army had been thrown away". The English left Santo Domingo and sailed for Jamaica, which they successfully conquered in a six-day campaign.

Venables and Penn were disgraced and imprisoned in the Tower of London. Historian C.H. Firth opined that the main cause of the failure at Hispaniola was the lack of co-operation on the part of Venables and Penn. Venables never obtained the confidence either of his officers or his soldiers. Samuel Pepys, Clerk of the Acts to the Navy Board, considered Admiral Penn a "false knave". Historian John Morrill wrote "[Venables] was over-promoted and under-supported in a high-profile fiasco in the Caribbean that cost him his reputation." His army was composed of inferior and undisciplined troops hastily assembled and badly equipped.

The site of the battle between the Spaniards and the English was renamed after the battle as the Puerta del Conde in honor of Governor Bernardino Meneses y Bracamonte, Count of Peñalba, who had commanded the Spanish forces resisting the invasion. It was subsequently claimed afterwards by the Spanish that English forces had been frightened by the nocturnal noise of the crabs on the beach of Haina; in honour of the victory the Spaniards created a commemorative gold crab, which they paraded down the streets of Santo Domingo in triumph. The gold crab has not survived; it was stolen by General Joseph de Barquier, the last French governor on the island.

== Order of battle ==
=== English fleet ===
Admiral William Penn's fleet at the 1655 Siege of Santo Domingo
Ship Name	Ship Type	Guns	Crew	Captain
Swiftsure (flag)	Warship	60	380	Jonas Poole
Paragon (vice-flag)	Warship	54	330	William Goodson
Torrington (rear-admiral)	Warship	54	330	George Dakins
Gloucester	Warship	54	330	Benjamin Blake
Marston Moor	Warship	54	330	Edward Blagg
Indian	Warship	44	210	Captain Terry
Lion	Warship	44	260	John Lumbert
Mathias	Warship	44	230	John White
Dover	Warship	40	190	Robert Saunders
Laurel	Warship	40	190	William Crispin
Portland	Warship	40	190	Richard Newberry
Bear	Warship	36	180	Francis Kirby
Great Charity	Warship	36	150	Leonard Harris
Selby	Warship	24	?	John Clark
Grantham	Warship	24	?	John Lightfoot
Martin	Warship (galley)	12	60	Willam Vessey
Convertine	Transport	30	?	John Hayward
Heart's Ease	Transport	30	?	Thomas Wright
Katherine	Transport	30	?	Willoughby Hannam
Half-Moon	Transport	28	?	Bartholomew Ketcher
Rosebush	Transport	28	?	Richard Hodges
Golden Cock	Transport	25	?	William Garrat
Gillyflower	Transport	24	?	Henry Fenn
Adam & Eve	Transport	20	?	William Coppin
Arms of Holland	Transport	20	?	Robert Story
Crow	Transport	20	?	Thomas Thompson
Marigold	Transport	20	?	Humphrey Felsted
Sampson	Transport	20	?	John Hubbard
Westergate	Transport	20	?	Samuel Hawkes
Cardiff	Transport	18	?	John Grove
Tulip	Transport	18	?	Jeffrey Dane
Falcon	Flyboat	24	?	Thomas Fleet
Falcon	Fireship	12	?	William Tickell
Hound	Transport	?	?	Richard Rooth
Falmouth	Transport	?	?	Robert Mills
Adventure	Dogger	?	?	?
Unknown	two ketches, one hoy	?	?	?

=== English army ===
General Robert Venables Army at the 1655 Siege of Santo Domingo
Regimental Commander	Senior Officers	No. of Officers	No. of Private Soldiers	
General Robert Venables	Major John Ferguson †; Captain Henry Disney †; Captain Thomas Hancock †; Captain George Butler †; Captain Obadiah Hinde †; Captain Parsons; Captain Cooke; Captain Pawlet; Captain Paris	132; 10 Staff officers	912	
Major General James Heane	Lt.-Colonel Clarke †; Major Samuel Barry; Captain Walters; Captain Gregory Tom; Captain Richard Young; Captain Smith; Captain Richard Bamford; Captain Henry Archibold	120; 10 Staff officers	1,052	
Colonel Richard Fortescue	Lt.-Colonel William Hill; Captain Henry Bartlett; Captain Samuel Leverington †; Captain Thomas White; Captain Bartholomew Davis; Captain Richard Wells; Captain Keene; Captain Edwards	120; 10 Staff officers	1,064	
Colonel Anthony Buller	Lt.-Colonel Francis Barrington; Major Michael Bland; Captain Barnard; Captain Minne; Captain Boulton; Captain Thomas Throckmorton; Captain Bingham; Captain Cooper; Captain Corbet; Lieutenant Francis Price	120; 10 Staff officers	916	
Colonel Andrew Carter	Lt.-Colonel Bushell Captain Nicholas Holford; Captain Nathaniel Bowers; Captain Blunt; Captain How; Captain Salkield; Captain Abraham Fincher; Captain Filkins	120; 10 Staff officers	834	
Colonel Edward D'Oyley	Lt.-Colonel Francis Mercer; Major John Reade; Captain Thomas Thornhill; Captain Noell; Captain Smith; Captain Richard Stevens; Captain Vavaster; Captain Augustine Thornhill; Captain Downes	120; 10 Staff officers	630	
Total	.	732	5602	
Scoutmaster General's Company	Isaac Berkenhead		60	
Artillery Train	Captain Hughes	.	60	
Firelocks?	Captain Johnson	12	120	
Horse	Captain Carpenter	10	56	
Reformados (unassigned forces)	Captain Jennings †	2	100	
Horse	Captain John Heane	12	65	
Total	.	36	445	
Grand Total	.	768	6,047	6,815

== See also ==
- Anglo-Spanish War (1654–60)
