= Sam Barry (disambiguation) =

Sam Barry (1892–1950) was an American coach.

Sam or Samuel Barry may also refer to:

- Sam Barry (author) (born 1957), American author
- Sam Barry (tennis) (born 1992), Irish tennis player
- Samuel Barry (fl. 17th century), Chief Justice of Jamaica and Governor of Surinam

== See also ==
- Samantha Barry (born 1981 or 1982), Irish journalist
- Sam Berry
