= Daniel Searle (colonial administrator) =

English tobacco planter and colonial administrator

Daniel Searle was an English tobacco planter and Governor of Barbados from 1652 to 1660.

He was appointed governor in 1652 when the island was captured by a Parliamentarian naval force under Sir George Ayscue. In December 1654, he was named one of three civil commissioners assigned to the Western Design, an expedition against the Spanish West Indies led by General Robert Venables and Admiral William Penn. On arrival in January 1655, He authorised the raising of a volunteer regiment by Colonel Lewis Morris but took no part in military operations.

He remained Governor until The Restoration of Charles II in 1660, when he was succeeded by Francis Willoughby, although he retained his seat on the colony council.

Searle's brother Robert was a privateer best known for his raid on Spanish controlled St. Augustine, Florida in 1668.

== Sources ==
- Brooks, Baylus C (2016). Quest for Blackbeard: The True Story of Edward Thache and His World. Lulu.com. ISBN 978-1365258855.
- Coldham, Peter Wilson (1987). The Complete Book of Emigrants: 1607-1660. Genealogical Publishing Com. ISBN 978-0806311920.

Government offices
Preceded by George Ayscue	Governor of Barbados; 1652–1660	Succeeded by Thomas Modyford, acting
