= Sam Berry =

Sam Berry may refer to:

- R. J. Berry (1934–2018), known as Sam, British geneticist, naturalist and Christian theorist
- Sam Berry (footballer) (born 2002), Australian rules footballer

== See also ==
- S. Stillman Berry (Samuel Stillman Berry, 1887–1984), American marine zoologist
- Sam Barry (disambiguation)
