= Raid on Málaga (1656) =

Battle during the Anglo–Spanish War of 1654–60

Raid on Malaga
- Part of the Anglo–Spanish War (1654–1660)
| Date | 21 July 1656 |
| Location | Málaga, Spain 36°43′10″N 4°25′12″W |
| Result | English victory |

Belligerents
| Spain | England |

Commanders and leaders
| Marquis of Mondéjar | Captain Smith |

Strength
| Various shore defenses 10 ships | five ships 1 fireship |

Casualties and losses
| 9 ships sunk Guns spiked | Unknown. |

The Raid on Malaga was a military action by the English against the Spanish city of Málaga on 21 July 1656 as part of the Anglo–Spanish War (1654–1660).

Five English ships including Dunbar, Ruby, Preston and Bryer, appeared at six in the morning in the Bay of Málaga. The Marquis of Mondéjar, governor of the city, raised the alarm. At 13:00 the English frigates approached the harbor and attacked a Genoese and a Sicilian galley. The Sicilian galley succeeded in escaping at the cost of two killed and the captain being wounded. The Genoese galley was less lucky: it was seized and set on fire, together with all other ships found in the harbor.

After this, the English started shelling the city and its defenses for four hours, seriously damaging Málaga Cathedral. Meeting little resistance, the English went ashore and destroyed the greater part of the city's munition supply. All the harbor guns were spiked as well. There were at least fourteen killed and many wounded in the city. A large part of the population fled to the countryside.

== Sources ==
Notes

External Sources

- Anglo-Spanish War – The Spanish Blockade
- Alfonso Vallejo: Balada sobre el ataque a Málaga de cinco fragatas inglesas en 1656. Jábega, ISSN 0210-8496, Nº. 7, 1974, pp. 40–44
- Spanish Wikipedia
