= Samuel Barry =

17th-century Chief Justice of Jamaica

Samuel Barry was Chief Justice of Jamaica in c. 1661–62. He was then Governor of Surinam from 3 November 1667 to 1 February 1668.

Barry was a captain in General James Heane's regiment at the Siege of Santo Domingo in April 1655.
