= William Goodsonn =

English naval officer

Vice-Admiral William Goodsonn
- Born: 1610
- Died: c. 1680
- Military career
- Allegiance: Kingdom of England
- Branch: Royal Navy
- Rank: Vice-Admiral
- Commands: Entrance; Jamaica Station; English Baltic Fleet (1658)
- Conflicts: Second English Civil War; First Anglo-Dutch War; Anglo-Spanish War

Vice-Admiral William Goodsonn (or Goodson; 1610 – in or after 1680) was an English naval officer.

== Early career ==
William Goodsonn joined the Parliamentary cause during the Second English Civil War in 1647. During the First Anglo-Dutch War he was captain of the Entrance in the battle of Portland, 25 January 1663. He was a rear-admiral of the blue in the battles of June and July 1653. In the Anglo-Spanish War, he was vice-admiral under William Penn in 1654 and was with him at the attempt on Hispaniola and the capture of Jamaica in 1655. He took over command of the Jamaica Station after Penn went home.

Goodsonn also took part in the Battle of the Dunes in 1658 (bombardment of the Spanish army by the English Navy to support the Anglo-French army).

== Operations in the Sound ==
In November 1658, Goodsonn was appointed Commander of the English Baltic Fleet that instructed to transport General at Sea Sir George Ayscue who was being loaned to Sweden to assist in their naval operations against Denmark and the Dutch.

In the autumn of 1658, a Dutch fleet commanded by Jacob van Wassenaer Obdam defeated the Swedes in the Battle of the Sound and lifted the blockade of Copenhagen. To protect English interests, on 13 November 1658 the Commonwealth Protector Richard Cromwell ordered a fleet to be sent to the Sound. The ships in Goodsonn’s fleet that conducted operations in the Sound were Swiftsure, Speaker, Plymouth, Newbury, Gloucester, Bridgewater, Essex, Newcastle, Ruby, Centurion, Nantwich, Preston, Adventure, Assurance, Maidstone, Expedition, Fagons, Forester, Elias, and Hind. The fleet of 20 ships, with Goodsonn in command as Vice-Admiral. was only half the size of the Dutch. It was sent as a political gesture to dissuade the Dutch from sending a second fleet to the Baltic.

All the fleet apart from Essex, Maidstone, and Expedition sailed from the Downs on 17 November, and the expedition left the Thames the following day. Goodsonn left Aldborough Bay on 18 November, but after three days he was forced back to port by strong winds. On 3 December, the fleet sailed again and, in six days, it reached the Skaw. Most of the fleet was prevented from rounding the Skaw by continuous winds.

On 15 December, having accomplished little, Goodsonn decided to return home. That night the wind became a gale. The Bridgewater ran into the stern of the Swiftsure, Goodsonn's flagship, and lost her bowsprit, foremast, and mainmast. The Preston lost her bowsprit, foremast, and main topmast, the Ruby sprung her mainmast and bowsprit, and nearly every ship was damaged. None was lost, and from 22 December until the end of the year they anchored on the English coast between Great Yarmouth and Harwich.

At the end of March 1659, Mountagu set out for the Baltic with a new fleet of 40 ships, with Goodsonn and Sir Richard Stayner as his deputies. On 16 May, following the collapse of Richard Cromwell’s government, fresh orders told Mountagu not to attack.

== Sources ==
- Anderson, R.C., ed. (1929). The Journal of Edward Mountagu, first Earl of Sandwich, admiral and general at sea, 1659-1665. London: Navy Records Society. OCLC 1880123.
- Capp, Bernard S. (1989). Cromwell's Navy: the Fleet and the English Revolution, 1648-1660. Oxford: Clarendon Press. ISBN 978-0-19-820115-1.
- Capp, Bernard (January 2008) [First published 2004]. "Goodsonn, William (b. 1609/10, d. in or after 1680)". Oxford Dictionary of National Biography (online ed.). Oxford University Press. doi:10.1093/ref:odnb/10986. (Subscription, Wikipedia Library access or UK public library membership required.)
- Cundall, Frank (1915). Historic Jamaica. West India Committee – via Internet Archive.
- Grainger, John D. (2014). The British Navy in the Baltic. Woodbridge, England: Boydell & Brewer. p. 43. ISBN 978-184383947-7.
