= Bernardino Meneses y Bracamonte, Count of Peñalba =

Spanish nobleman and military leader (c.1625–1656)

Bernardino de Meneses y Bracamonte, 1st Count de Peñalva (c. 1625 in Talavera de la Reina – 30 January 1656 in Cartagena de Indias) was a Spanish nobleman and military leader during the Anglo-Spanish War (1654). He participated in the Siege of Santo Domingo (1655) and was victorious over the English forces.
