= General at sea =

Defunct navy rank

- Flag of the general at sea
- Country: England
- Service branch: Parliamentary Navy
- Equivalent ranks: Admiral

The rank of general at sea (occasionally referred to as "general of the fleet"), was the highest position of command in the English Parliamentary Navy (later the Navy of the Commonwealth of England, Scotland and Ireland), and approximates to the current rank of admiral. Alongside others, the generals at sea were also appointed as Commissioners for the Admiralty and Navy.

The generals at sea were referred to both by the title of 'general' and by their former army ranks interchangeably. Today, the title 'admiral' is also commonly – if incorrectly – used.

== The generals at sea ==
In February 1649, within a month of the execution of Charles I, the Council of State decided to put the office of Lord High Admiral into abeyance, and Colonel Robert Blake, Colonel Edward Popham and Colonel Richard Deane were appointed by Parliament as the first generals at sea and Commissioners for the Admiralty and Navy.

After Popham's death in 1651 he was succeeded in 1652 by General George Monck.

Deane was recalled to serve in the army in May 1651, before resuming his post as general at sea in 1652, but was killed at the start of the Battle of the Gabbard on 1 June 1653.

Following the death of Deane, Blake and Monck continued to serve alone until 3 December 1653, when Parliament decided to increase the number of generals at sea to four, with a quorum of two, appointing Major-General John Desborow and Vice-Admiral William Penn (who had been recommended by Monck, and who was the first sailor, rather than the traditional soldier, to be promoted to that rank) to serve alongside Blake and Monck as generals at sea, with all four also serving as Commissioners for the Admiralty and Navy along with Colonel Philip Jones, Colonel John Clerk, John Stone, Major William Burton, Vincent Gooking and Lieutenant-Colonel Kelsey.

Penn's naval career was suspended after the failure to successfully execute the Western Design against Spanish colonies in the West Indies in 1655, which resulted in his temporary imprisonment in the Tower of London. Although Penn was forced to resign his commission as a result of this, he must have been recalled by Cromwell later, as he was recorded by the Dutch Ambassador to England in March 1658 as being in charge of a fleet. During the unstable political times of Cromwell's final illness and after, he decided to leave the navy in order to play his part in the maintenance of law and order and successfully stood as Member of Parliament for Weymouth in 1660 (after failing in Bristol).

However, his pre-eminence as a sailor was manifest in the fact that despite having been a leading naval officer under Cromwell, Penn was chosen by parliament to welcome King Charles II onto the Naseby to bring him back to England from his exile. At their meeting, off Scheveningen on 23 May, the King knighted him, and on the journey back the ship was renamed from Naseby to Charles. Penn was subsequently appointed one of the commissioners for the navy and worked alongside Samuel Pepys in the Navy Board (and at one point was also his neighbour in Navy Board accommodation in Seething Lane). He was one of the most distinguished naval commanders of his era who had revolutionized naval tactics (writing a new naval code: Duties of a Commander at Sea, 1664, Instructions by Sir W. Penn). His pre-eminence was testified to by Pepys, who acknowledged his naval skill and was jealous of him as a result.

In January 1656, Edward Montagu was appointed general at sea.

Blake continued to serve until his death at sea on 7 August 1657, and Montagu until 1665.

== Gallery ==
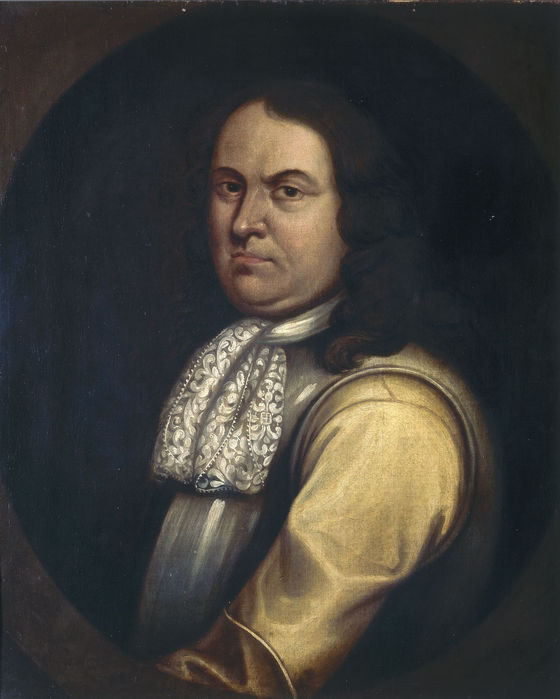
Robert Blake

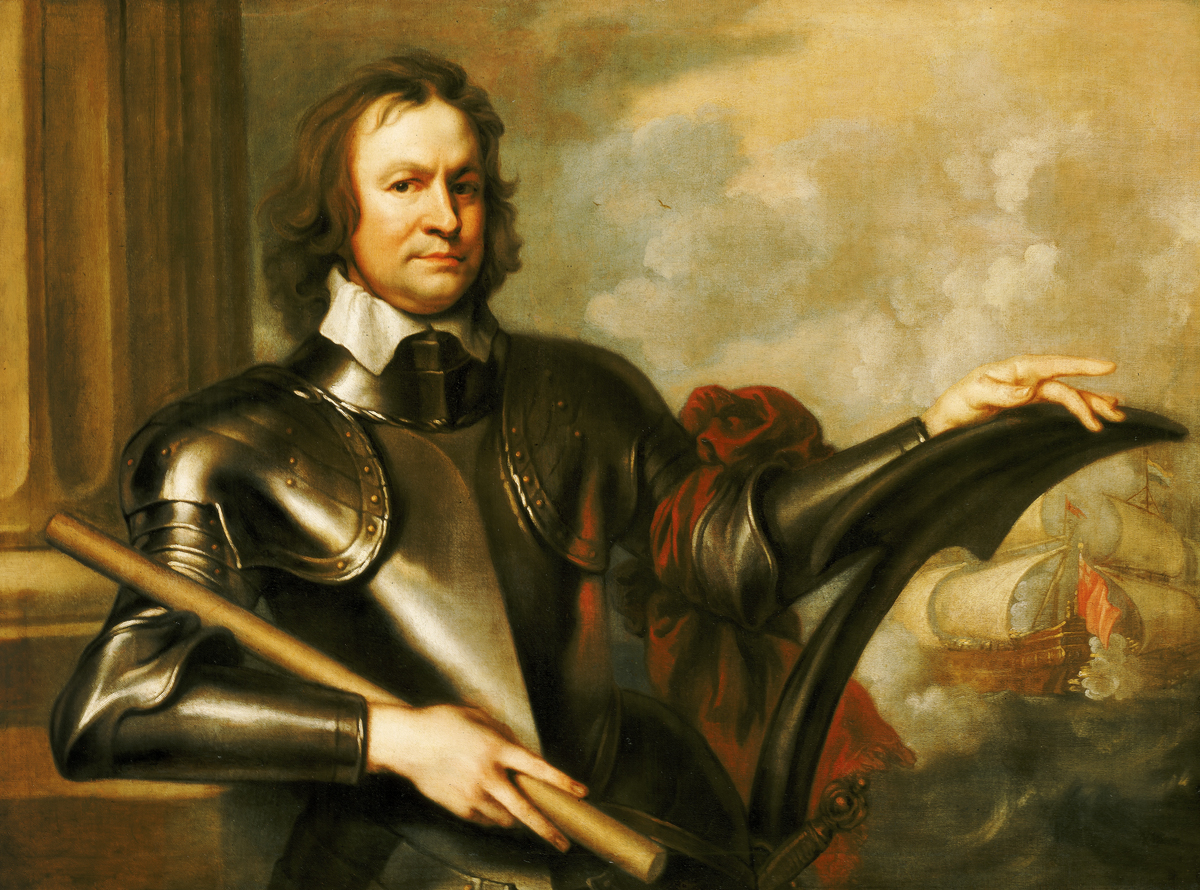
Richard Deane

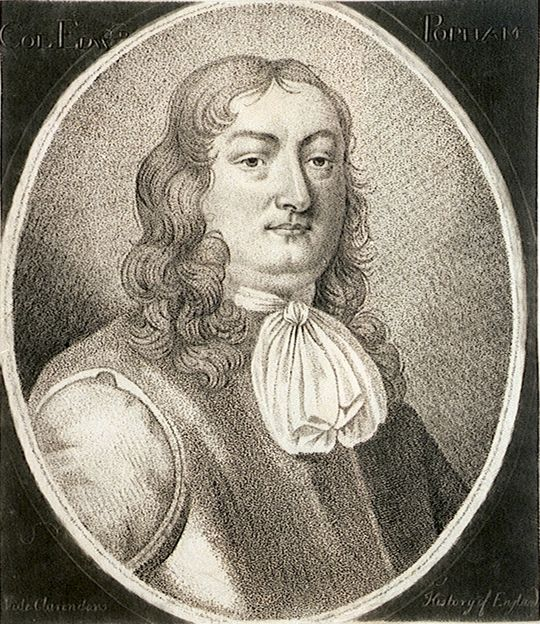
Edward Popham

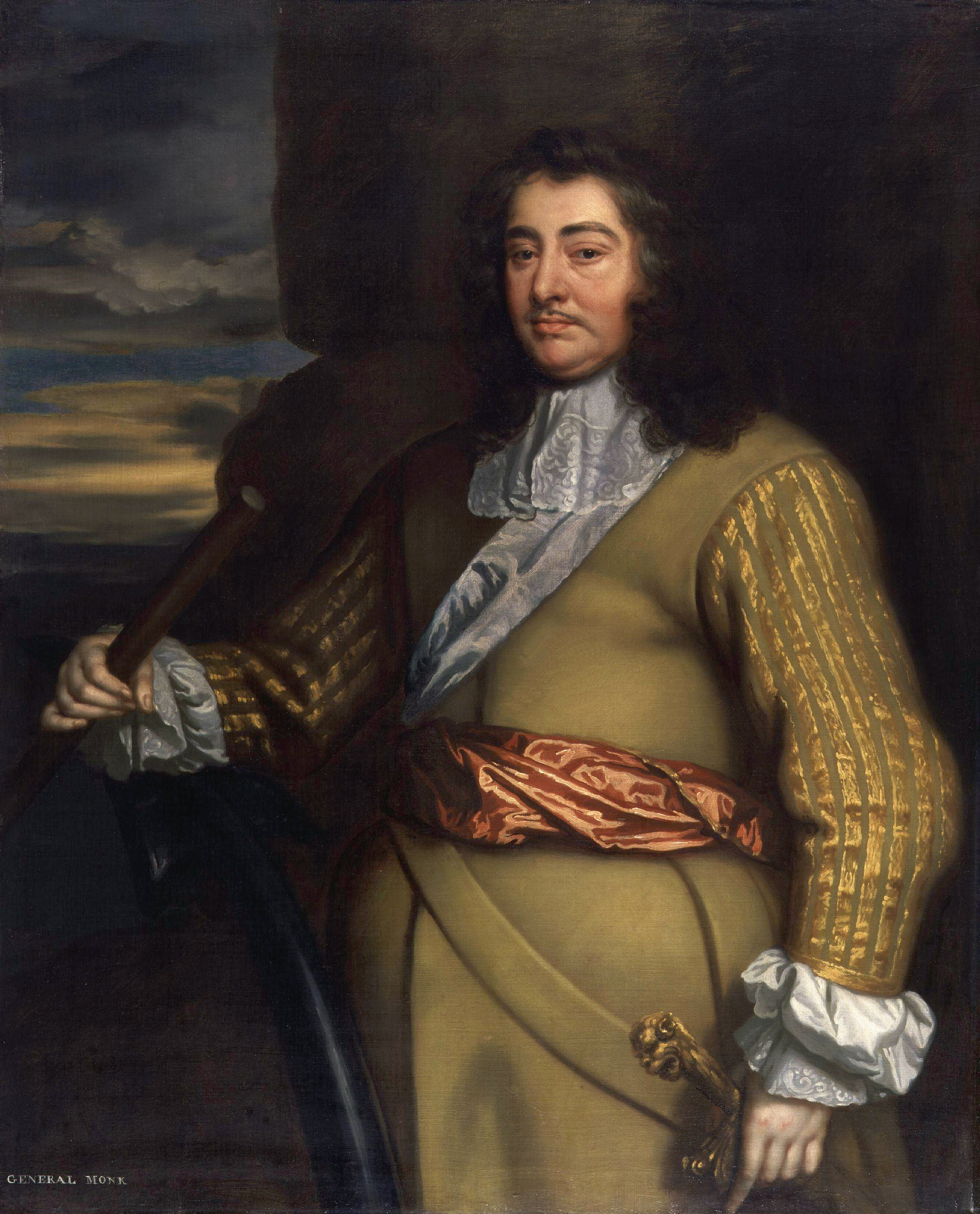
George Monck

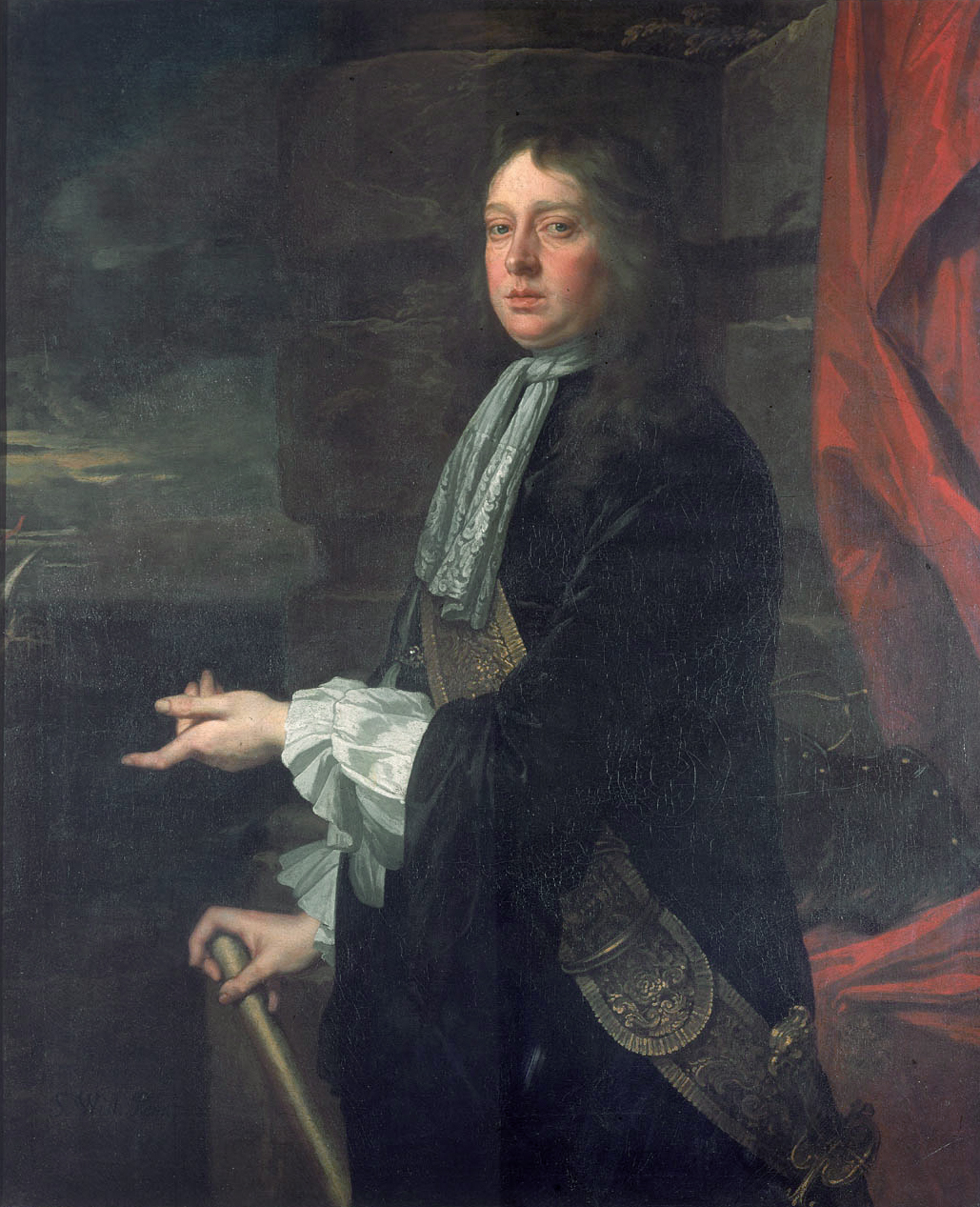
William Penn

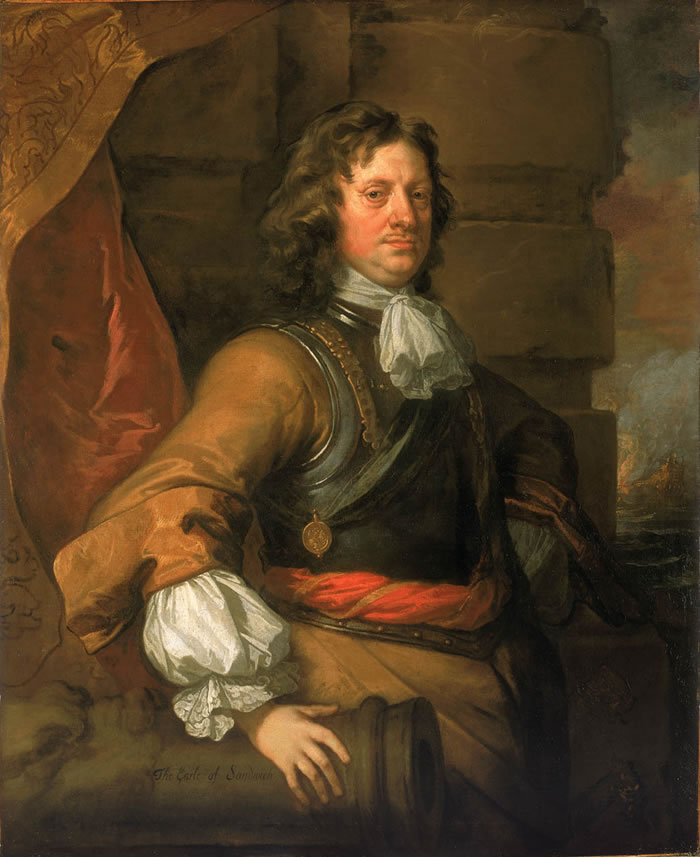
Edward Montagu

== Rank insignia and personal flag ==
Included:

Generals at Sea in command of the red squadron

Flag of the commonwealth flown at the main mast.

Red ensign flown at the aft mast.

Generals at Sea in command of the white squadron

Flag of the commonwealth flown at the main mast.

White ensign flown at the aft mast.

Generals at Sea in command of the blue squadron

Flag of the commonwealth flown at the main mast.

Blue ensign flown at the aft mast.
