= Juan Ramírez de Arellano =

Juan Ramirez de Arellano may refer to:

- Juan Ramírez de Arellano el Noble (died 1385), Navarrese statesman
- Juan Ramírez de Arellano el Mozo (died 1385), son of prec., Castilian soldier
- Juan Ramírez de Arellano (died 1468), granson of prec., Castilian nobleman
- Juan Ramírez de Arellano (bishop) (died 1609), Guatemalan prelate
- Juan Ramírez de Arellano y Manrique de Lara (died 1643), Catalan nobleman
- Juan Ramírez de Arellano (died 1644), Spanish functionary
- Juan A. Ramírez de Arellano (mayor), alcalde of Ponce, Puerto Rico
- Juan Ramírez de Arellano (painter) (died 1782), Spanish Baroque painter
- Juan Ramírez de Arellano (journalist) (died 1937), Mexican journalist and politician
