= Anglo-Spanish War (1654–1660) =

War between the Commonwealth of England and Spain

Anglo-Spanish War of 1654–1660
- Part of the Franco-Spanish War
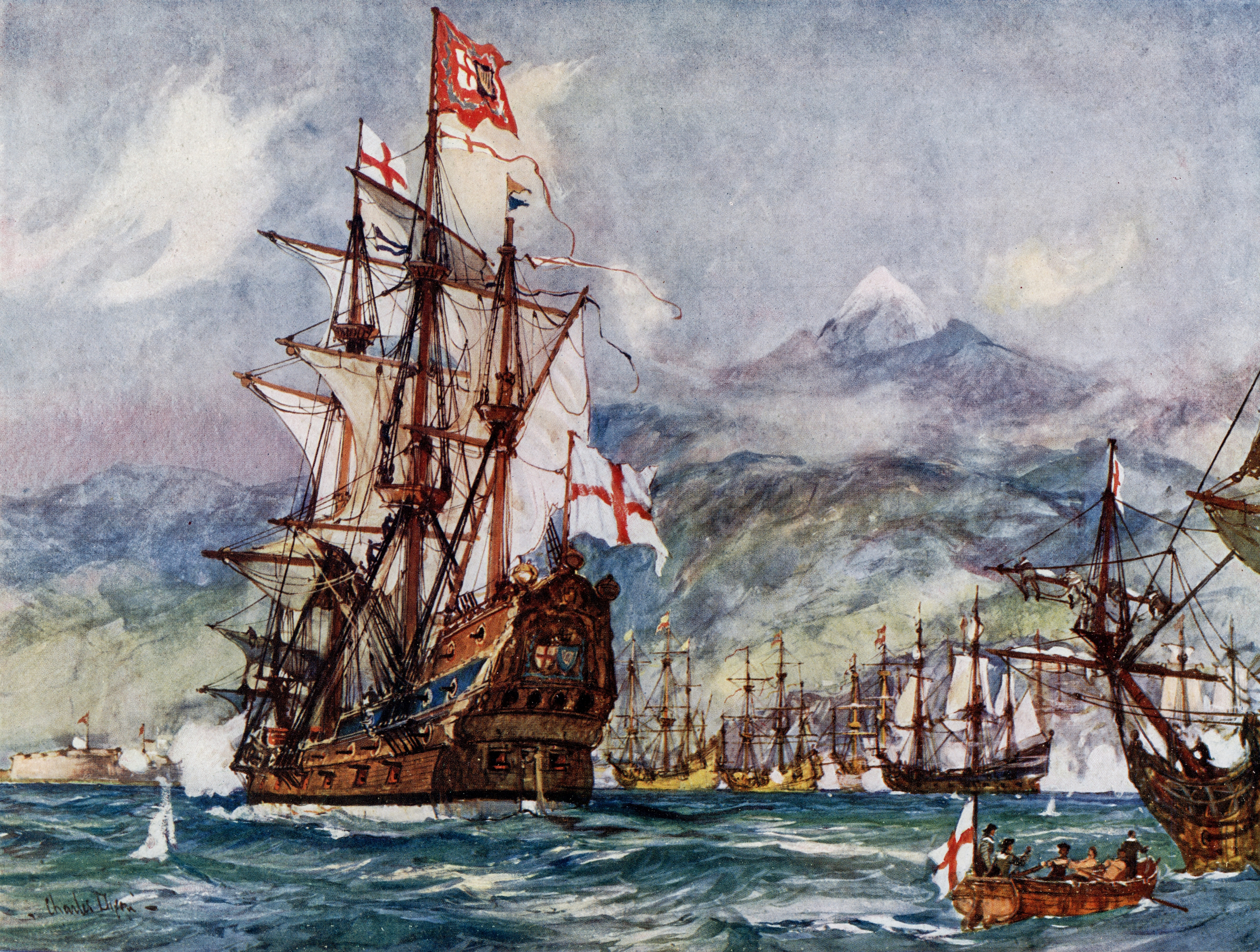
- The Battle of Santa Cruz de Tenerife in 1657
Date	1654–1660
Location	Caribbean, Spain and Spanish Netherlands
Result	English victory
Territorial changes	Acquisition of Jamaica, the Cayman Islands, Tortuga, Dunkirk and Mardyck by the Commonwealth of England

Belligerents
Commonwealth of England; France (1657–59)	Spain

Commanders and leaders
(Commonwealth of England) Oliver Cromwell (Kingdom of France) King Louis XIV Caribbean: (Commonwealth of England) William Penn (Commonwealth of England) Robert Venables (Commonwealth of England) Edward Doyley (Commonwealth of England) Christopher Myngs (Commonwealth of England) Henry Morgan Spain: (Commonwealth of England) Robert Blake (Commonwealth of England) Richard Stayner (Commonwealth of England) Benjamin Blake Flanders: (Commonwealth of England) John Reynolds (Commonwealth of England) Thomas Morgan (Kingdom of France) Vicomte de Turenne	(Spain) King Philip IV Caribbean: Bernardino de Meneses; Cristóbal Arnaldo Isasi Spain: Pablo Fernández de Contreras; Marcos del Puerto; Diego de Egüés Flanders: Willem Bette †; Juan José de Austria; Louis, Grand Condé

Casualties and losses
~7,500 soldiers and sailors killed in action	~7,500 soldiers and sailors killed in action

The Anglo-Spanish War of 1654–1660 was fought between the Commonwealth of England and Habsburg Spain. It was driven by the economic and religious rivalry between the two countries, with each side attacking the other's commercial and colonial interests in various ways, such as privateering and naval expeditions.

In 1655, an English amphibious expedition invaded Spanish territory in the Caribbean, eventually capturing the island of Jamaica. In 1657, England formed an alliance with France, merging the Anglo-Spanish war with the larger Franco-Spanish War, with major land actions that took place in the Spanish Netherlands.

Although the war was terminated after the Restoration of King Charles II of England in 1660, tensions in the Caribbean with regard to the English possession of Jamaica kept the conflict going intermittently for over ten years. This included raids on Spanish territory by notable Privateer Henry Morgan. The war officially ended with two peace treaties, which were signed at Madrid in 1667 and 1670.

== Background ==
When the First Anglo-Dutch War came to an end, Cromwell turned his attention to the conflict between France and Spain, both traditional rivals of England. France and Spain were both of the Roman Catholic faith, anathema to Cromwell, who believed it is God's will that Protestantism should prevail in Europe. However, he considered Spain to be the greater threat to the Protestant cause, and thus pragmatically allied his nation with France. By going to war with Spain, he also sought a return to a policy of commercial opportunism pursued in the days of Elizabeth I and subsequently abandoned by her Stuart successors. Cromwell's attack on Spanish trade and treasure routes immediately recalled the exploits of Francis Drake and Walter Raleigh; and it is not by accident that printed accounts of their activities began to circulate in England at this time. There was, however, one important difference: alongside silver and gold a new treasure was becoming ever more important – sugar. This meant occupation of territory, a step beyond the piracy pursued in Elizabethan days.

During the first year of the Protectorate, Cromwell conducted negotiations with the French statesman Cardinal Mazarin, resulting in the drafting of an Anglo-French alliance against Spain in October 1655. The alliance had an added benefit: France, which was currently offering refuge to the Stuarts, would now be disinclined to assist them in reclaiming the English throne.

== War ==
=== Western Design ===
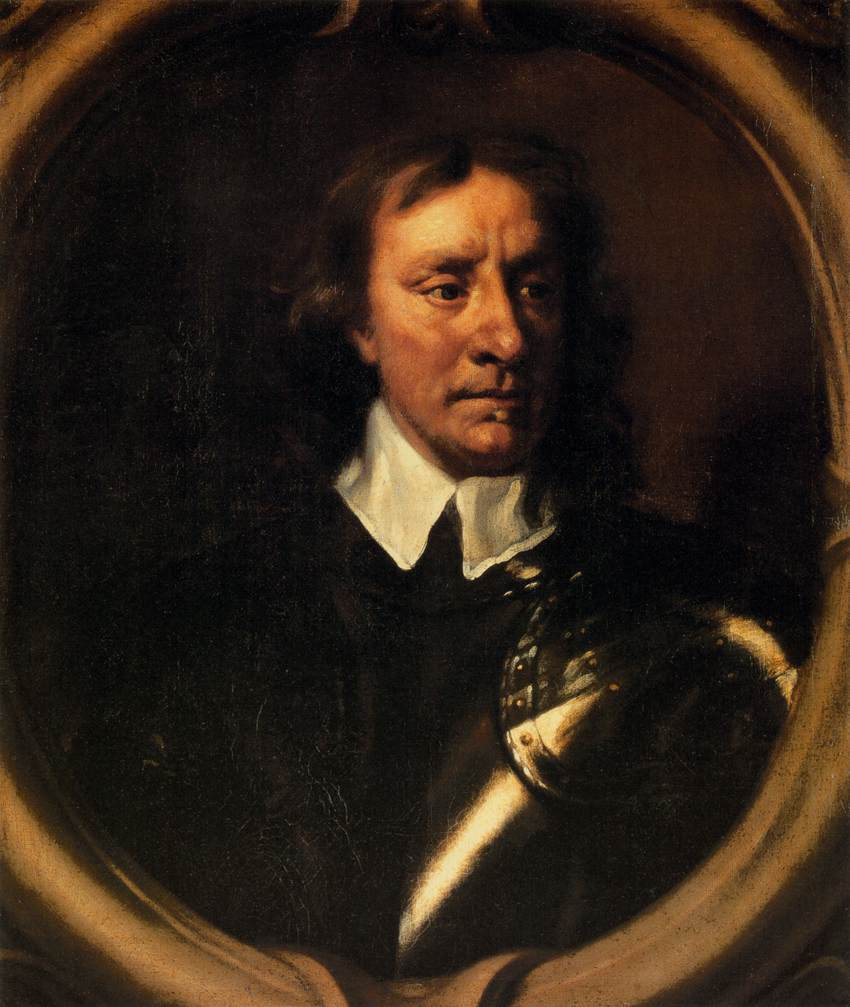
Oliver Cromwell

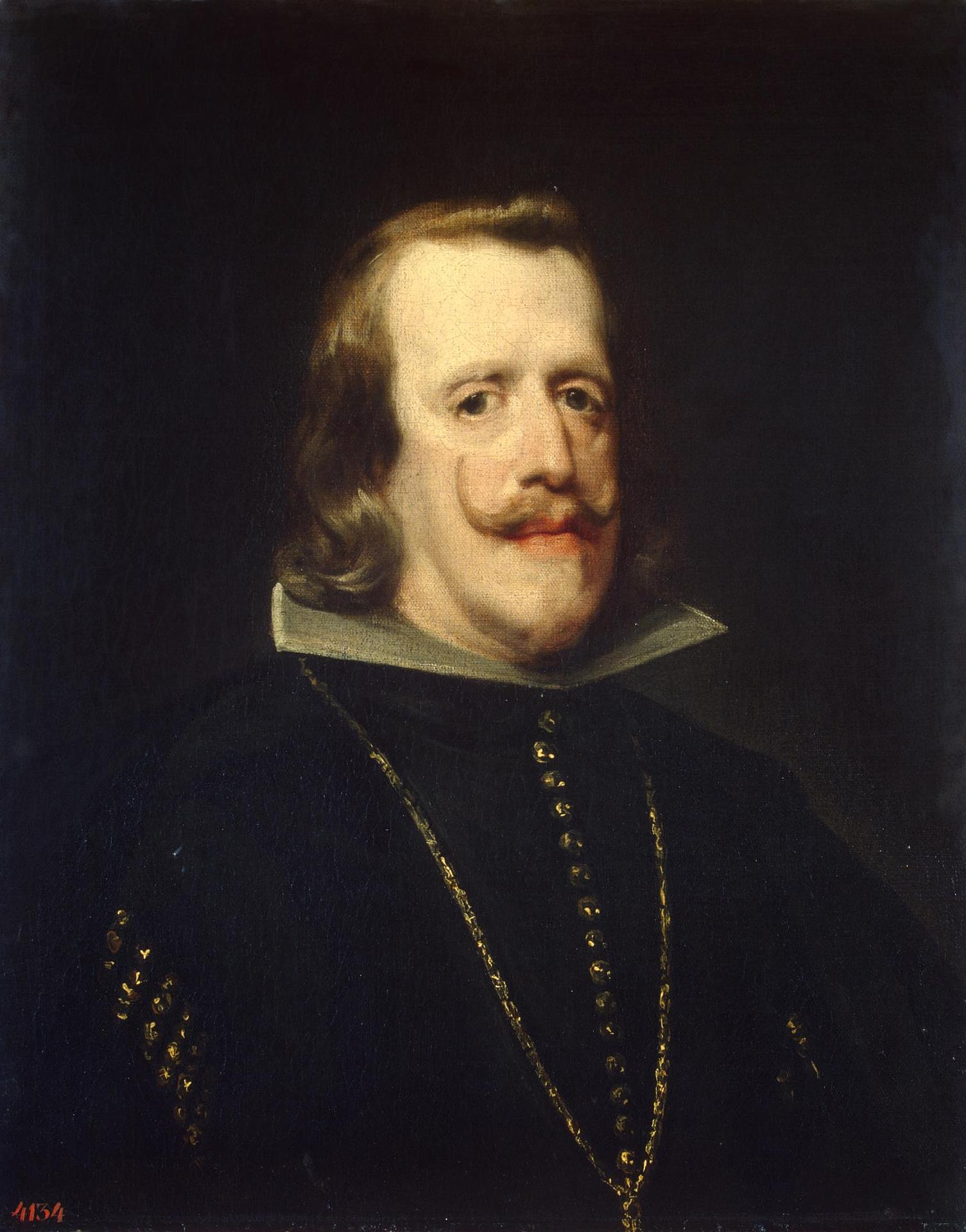
Philip IV

Meanwhile, Cromwell had already launched the Western Design against Spain's colonies in the Spanish West Indies. The fleet left Portsmouth in late December 1654 and arrived in the West Indies in January. In May 1655, an English amphibious expedition led by General at Sea William Penn, father of the founder of Pennsylvania, and General Robert Venables invaded Spanish territory in the West Indies with the objective of capturing Hispaniola. It was one of the strongest ever to sail from England, with some 3,000 marines under the command of General Robert Venables, further reinforced in Barbados, Montserrat, and St. Kitts and Nevis.

Although Cromwell had previously been interested in the possible acquisition of Hispaniola island, the expedition's commanders were given the freedom to determine their own priorities in the circumstances they faced on arrival. Several options were considered, including a landing on the coast of Guatemala or on Cuba. Both were discounted, as Penn and Venables decided to attempt to repeat Drake's attack on Santo Domingo on Hispaniola. However, the 1655 Siege of Santo Domingo failed because the Spanish had improved their defences in the face of Dutch attacks earlier in the century. Cromwell, on the other hand, saw the Hispaniola defeat as God's judgement. Despite various subsequent successes, the defeat made the whole operation against the Spanish West Indies a general failure. Venables and Penn were imprisoned therefore in the Tower of London on their arrival on England.

Jamaica was the casus belli that resulted in the actual Anglo-Spanish War in 1655. Weakened by fever, the English force then sailed west for the Colony of Santiago (present-day Jamaica), the only Spanish West Indies island that did not have new defensive works. They landed in May 1655 at a place called Santiago de la Vega, now Spanish Town. They came, and they stayed, in the face of prolonged local resistance that was reinforced by troops sent from Spain and New Spain (México). In 1657 the English Governor invited the Buccaneers to base themselves at Port Royal on Santiago, to deter the Spanish from recapturing the island. For England, Jamaica was to be the "dagger pointed at the heart of the Spanish Empire", although in fact it was a possession of little value then. Cromwell, despite all difficulties, was determined that the presence should remain, sending reinforcements and supplies. New Spanish troops, sailing from Cuba, lost the Battle of Ocho Rios in 1657 and the Battle of Rio Nuevo in 1658, failing in their attempts to retake Jamaica. Nevertheless, the fear of another invasion meant that the English Governor of Jamaica Edward D'Oyley felt his new duty was to organize the defence of the island against the Spanish. By using the tactic of attacking instead of defending, he sent out Christopher Myngs to raid Spanish colonial cities and bases. Tolú and Santa Marta were among them in 1658 and the following year Cumana, Puerto Caballos and Coro were plundered and devastated and Myngs returned to Jamaica with a vast amount of plunder and treasure.

=== Naval war ===
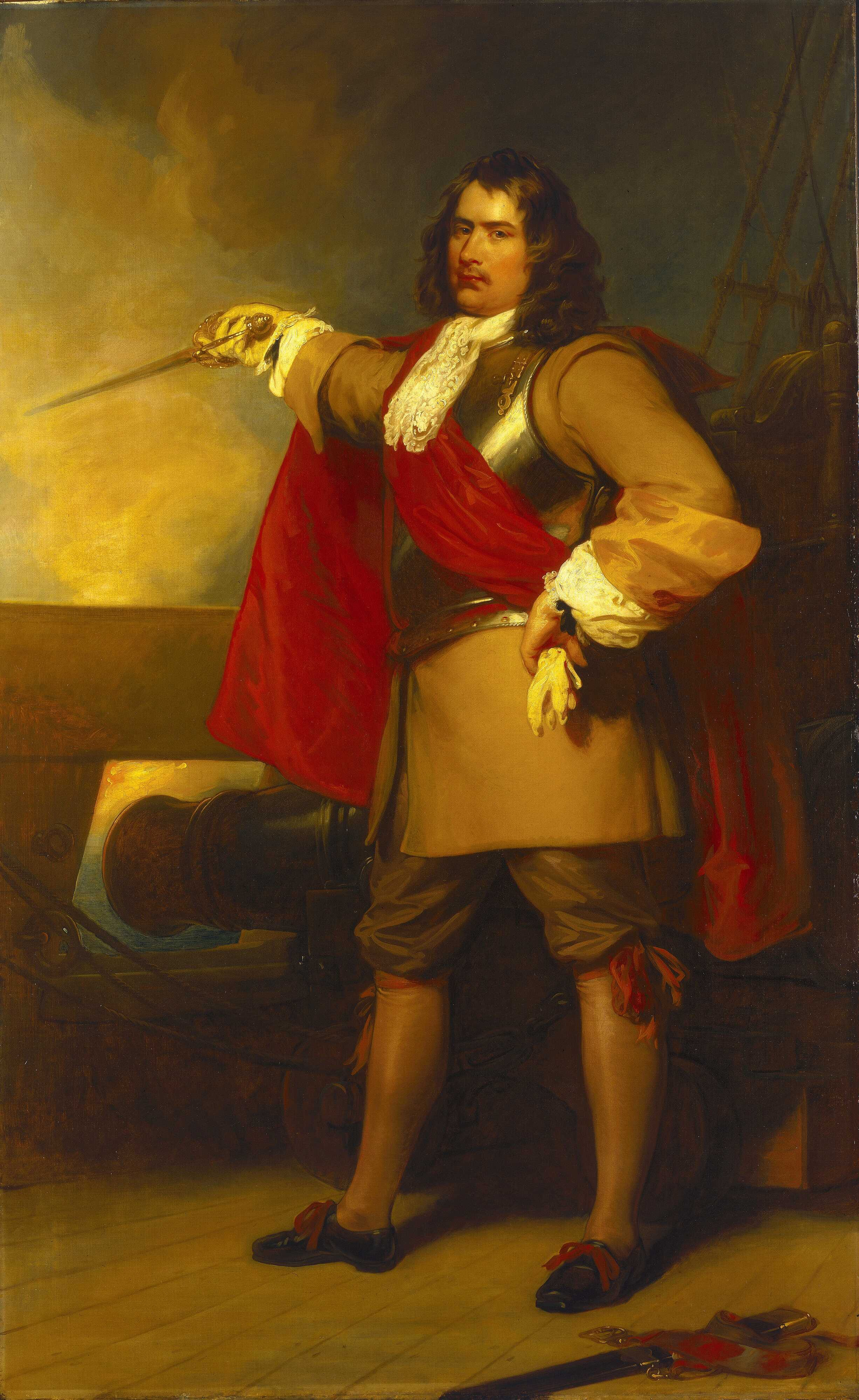
Admiral Robert Blake

In April 1656 English Admiral Robert Blake with a fleet of around forty warships, fireships and supply vessels sailed to blockade the Spanish port of Cádiz which continued throughout the summer. The Spanish remained on the defensive and took no aggressive action against the English fleet. In mid-June, Captain Edward Blagg sailed with eight ships to raid ports in northern Spain. On 24 June, Blagg raided Vigo, where a number of ships in the harbour were destroyed. While Blake replenished his water supplies on the African coast, a detachment of five frigates under a Captain Smith raided Malaga in southern Spain on 19 July. Smith sank nine Spanish ships, spiked the harbour guns and bombarded the town. A similar raid on Alicante was unsuccessful, but the threat of attack disrupted trade all along the coasts of Spain. On the evening of 8 September, one of Blake's captains, Richard Stayner, intercepted a Spanish treasure fleet and captured or sank all but two of its ships. The loss of the cargoes of the ships captured or sunk by the English was a serious blow to the economy of Spain with an estimated loss of £2,000,000. For the first time in naval history, Blake kept the fleet at sea throughout an entire winter in order to maintain the blockade against Spain.

In February 1657, Blake received intelligence that the plate fleet from New Spain was on its way across the Atlantic. Leaving two ships to watch Cádiz, Blake sailed from there to attack the plate fleet, which had docked at Santa Cruz on Tenerife in the Canary Islands to await an escort to Spain. In April in the Battle of Santa Cruz de Tenerife, Blake completely destroyed the Spanish merchant convoy—the West Indian Fleet—however, the fleet had landed the bullion before the battle. Blake was unable to seize it, but it was also unavailable to the government in Madrid.

The short-term effect of Blake's blockade of Spain and his victory at Santa Cruz was the disruption of the Spanish economy, which depended upon silver and gold from the Americas and thereby damaged Spain's capacity for waging war. The English lost 1,500 to 2,000 merchant ships to Spanish privateers and instead of using captured English ships to replace their destroyed convoys, the Spanish government placed the care of Spanish trade in the hands of neutral Dutch merchantmen.

=== Flanders ===
An Anglo-French alliance against Spain was established when the Treaty of Paris was signed in March 1657. Based on the terms of the treaty, the English would join with France in her continuing war against Spain in Flanders. France would contribute an army of 20,000 men, England would contribute both 6,000 troops and the English fleet in a campaign against the Flemish coastal fortresses of Gravelines, Dunkirk and Mardyck. It was agreed that Gravelines would be ceded to France, Dunkirk and Mardyck to England. Dunkirk, in particular, was on the Commonwealth's mind mainly because of the privateers that were causing damage to the mercantile fleet. For Cromwell and the Commonwealth, the question of possession of Dunkirk thus passed from regional diplomatic possibility to urgent political necessity.

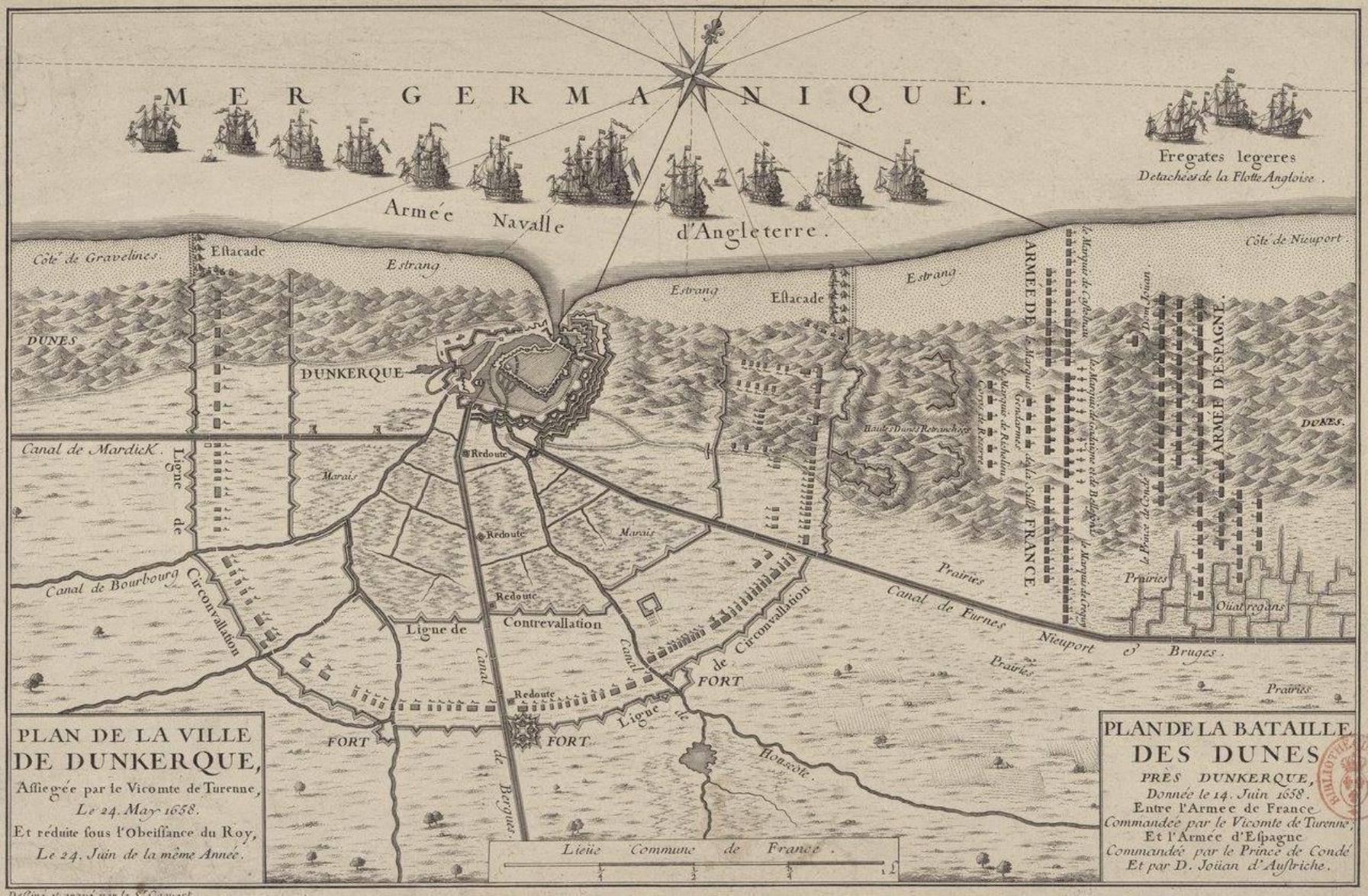
Map showing the siege of Dunkirk and the Battle of the Dunes in 1658. Also present are the blockading British fleet.

The combined Anglo-French army for the invasion of Flanders was commanded by the great French Marshal Turenne. The Spanish Army of Flanders was commanded by Don Juan-José, an illegitimate son of the Spanish King Philip IV. The Spanish army of 15,000 troops was augmented by a force of 3,000 English Royalists—formed as the nucleus of potential army for the invasion of England by Charles II, with Charles's brother James, Duke of York, among its commanders.

The Commonwealth fleet blockaded Flemish ports but, to Cromwell's annoyance, the military campaign started late in the year and was subject to many delays. Marshal Turenne spent the summer of 1657 campaigning against the Spanish in Luxembourg and made no move to attack Flanders until September. Mardyck was captured on 22 September and garrisoned by Commonwealth troops. Dunkirk was besieged in May 1658. A Spanish relief force attempted to lift the siege but was defeated on 4 June at the Battle of the Dunes. The Commonwealth contingent in Turenne's army fought with distinction and impressed their French allies with a successful assault up a strongly defended sandhill 150 feet high during the battle. When Dunkirk surrendered to Turenne on 14 June, Cardinal Mazarin honoured the terms of the treaty with Cromwell and handed the port over to the Commonwealth, despite the protests of Louis XIV. The Commonwealth also honoured its obligations in respecting the rights of the Catholic populations of Mardyck and Dunkirk. A contingent of Commonwealth troops remained with Turenne's army and were instrumental in the capture of Gravelines and other Flemish towns by the French. With the privateering threat of Dunkirk out of the way, England's mercantile fleet suffered far fewer losses; not only because the Dunkirkers had lost their largest base, but because English trade had already been largely lost to the Dutch as a result of Dunkirker privateering.

=== Restoration ===
The war between France and Spain ended with the signing of the Peace of the Pyrenees on 28 October 1659. Cromwell's death in 1658 left England in political turmoil that would result in the return of the Stuarts to the throne of England. After the Restoration of Charles II, the Anglo-Spanish War was formally terminated in September 1660 but no treaty was signed between the two nations. Charles had been allied to Spain through the Treaty of Brussels.

== Aftermath ==
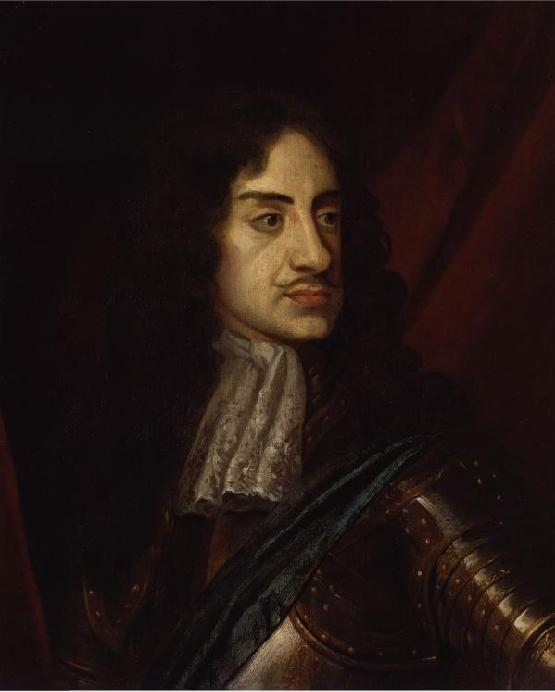
Portrait of King Charles II from 1665. Charles led a covert war against Spain seeking a favourable peace.

England and Spain had both suffered heavy economic losses; the Spanish suffered mainly from Blake's blockade of Cádiz. The effect of this, particularly with the English victories off Cádiz and Santa Cruz, was the disruption of Spain's economy which depended upon silver and gold from the Americas. This added to the difficulties of Philip's IV's overstretched armies, who for years had been campaigning simultaneously in Italy, the Pyrenees, Flanders and Portugal. The Spanish answered with a privateering campaign that all but wiped out English overseas trade. Consequently, the Dutch enjoyed a recovery from the losses they had suffered in the First Anglo-Dutch War and took much trade from the English. Nevertheless, with its victory in the First Anglo-Dutch War and the successes in the war against Spain, England established itself as one of Europe's leading naval powers.

Spain demanded the return of possessions taken by Cromwell's republic, to which Charles had been willing to agree. This soon changed however as Charles had become frustrated with Philip's failure to aid in his restoration. Only a week after war had ended Charles annulled the Brussels treaty and allowed the Parliament of England to annex England's conquests (Jamaica, Dunkirk and Mardyck) despite Spanish protests. At the same time Charles sought a treaty with Spain so that English possession of the conquests could be recognised but the terms for Spain were too harsh and there was hope that the latter would recapture Jamaica in a military campaign. In order to increase his finances Charles sold Dunkirk to Louis XIV of France in November 1662 – though less than £300,000 of the promised half million was ever paid.

=== Anglo-Portuguese alliance ===
In 1662, Charles made a dynastic marriage with Catharine of Braganza; Tangier and Bombay were ceded to England and a military alliance was agreed to help Portugal who had been fighting to regain her independence since 1640. An English expeditionary force under Frederick Schomberg were raised to serve to help fight the Spanish. Within a year Spain attempted to overrun Portugal but at the crucial Battle of Ameixial the Portuguese and English inflicted a crushing defeat on the Spanish army.

In 1664 England through Sir Richard Fanshawe sought to adjust a peace between the Portuguese and Spanish crowns and then between England and Spain but to no avail. At the Battle of Montes Claros a year later another Spanish invasion was decisively defeated so much so that it ended major combat operations during the war which definitively secured Portuguese independence from Spain.

=== Caribbean war ===
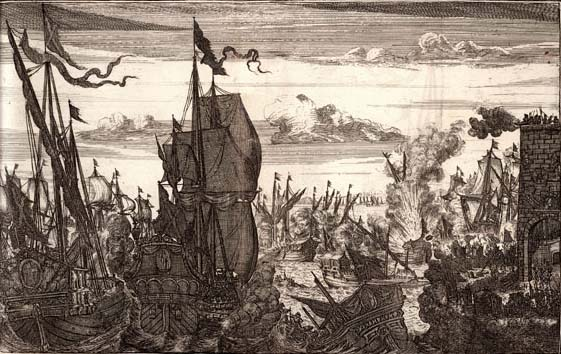
Privateer Henry Morgan destroys the Spanish fleet on Lake Maracaibo in 1669.

The war's Caribbean component raged on much longer. With Jamaica annexed the purpose of the Western Design (although failed in its primary objective of capturing the island of Hispaniola) survived the Protectorate itself, later to be revived in the raids ordered under the behest of the Jamaican governor Thomas Modyford. Modyford's pretexts for licensing the buccaneers was his suspicion that Jamaica would never be secure until the Spanish government acknowledged England's possession of Jamaica and the Cayman Islands and having it named in a treaty. The resulting privateer raids on the Spanish Main over the next ten years were devastating. Christopher Myngs raided Santiago de Cuba in 1662 and Campeche the following year. Henry Morgan later took over - his most notable attacks were at Puerto del Príncipe and at Porto bello, both in 1668 and the defeat of a Spanish squadron on Lake Maracaibo the following year. The Spanish meanwhile could do little to protect themselves.

In response Mariana, the Queen Regent of Spain, issued letters of marque for privateer attacks on English shipping in the Caribbean. One of these privateers was the famed Portuguese pirate Manuel Ribeiro Pardal. Charles II ordered the same – so Modyford commissioned Morgan once again to raid the Spanish main in order to preserve Jamaica once and for all. In December 1670 Morgan seized the islands of Old Providence and Santa Catalina forcing the garrisons to surrender. From there his fleet sailed to Chagres and seized the fort there too – Morgan hoped to cross the Isthmus of Panama but at this time he was unaware of events in Europe.

=== Madrid treaties ===
Spain during this period had been weakened politically, economically, and militarily by decades of war on multiple fronts and internal conflict. Charles II thus saw ideal opportunities which led to two peace treaties at Madrid, both of which were favourable to England. The first, the Treaty of Madrid (1667), was beneficial to England for its commercial provisions, and was welcomed by statesmen and merchants alike. With Portugal's restoration secured, the English expeditionary force in Portugal was subsequently disbanded, although England's Caribbean possessions remained unsettled.

Three years later, in the Treaty of Madrid (1670), Spain formally recognised English possession of Jamaica and the Cayman Islands. The treaty also granted English ships greater freedom of navigation in the Caribbean, where they were no longer officially treated by Spain as intruders or pirates. The treaty was thus seen as a humiliation by many in Spain and her colonies. News of the treaty did not arrive in time to prevent Henry Morgan's expedition which saw Panama plundered and burned in March 1671. Despite Spanish protests and Morgan's arrest, he was not punished, later claiming that he had been unaware of the agreement.

England and Spain were allies during the subsequent War of the Grand Alliance and remained largely at peace until the outbreak of the War of the Spanish Succession in 1702.

== See also ==
- Antonio de Vea expedition
- Military history of Britain
- History of Jamaica
