= William Penn (Royal Navy officer) =

English naval officer and politician (1621–1670)

Admiral Sir William Penn
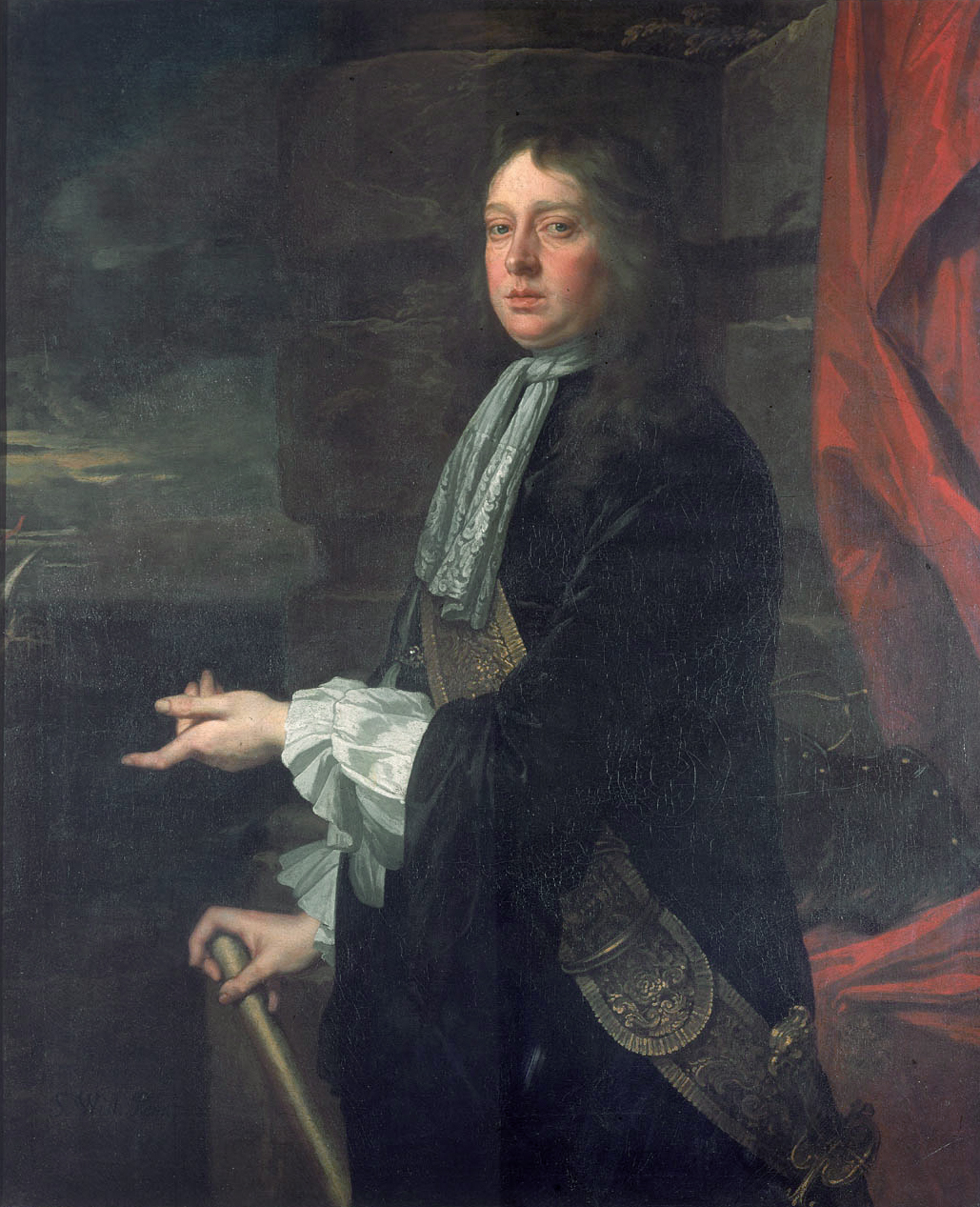
- Portrait by Sir Peter Lely, 1665–1666
- Born: 23 April 1621; Bristol
- Died: 16 September 1670 (aged 49); Walthamstow, Essex
- Children: 3, including William
- Military career
- Allegiance: Commonwealth of England; Kingdom of England
- Branch: English navy Royal Navy
- Service years: –1670
- Rank: Admiral
- Commands: Jamaica Station
- Conflicts: English Civil War; First Anglo-Dutch War; Second Anglo-Dutch War

Admiral Sir William Penn (23 April 1621 – 16 September 1670) was an English naval officer and politician who served as a Member of Parliament for Weymouth and Melcombe Regis in the House of Commons of England from 1660 to 1670. His son William Penn, the founder of the Province of Pennsylvania, named the colony in his honour.

== Early life and education ==
Penn was born in St Thomas Parish in Bristol, England, to Captain Giles Penn, an English military officer and consul of Salé, Morocco, and his wife Joan Gilbert. He completed his sea apprenticeship under his father.

== Career ==
=== Naval career ===
Coat of Arms of William Penn

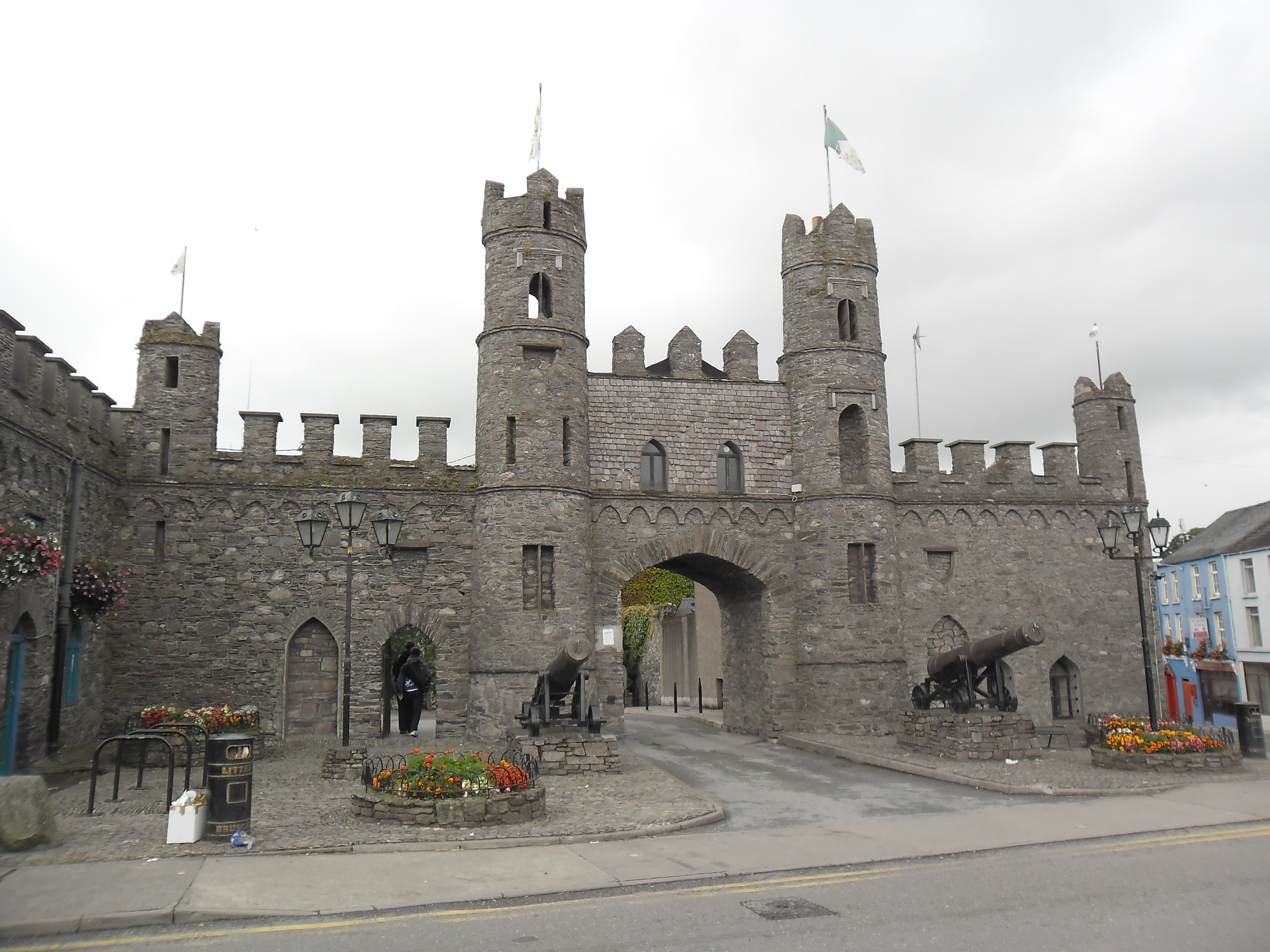
Macroom Castle gatehouse

In the First English Civil War, which was fought between 1642 and 1646, Penn fought on the side of the Parliamentarians and commanded a ship in the squadron maintained against Charles I of England in the Irish seas. In 1648, he was arrested and sent to London, but was soon released and sent back as rear admiral in Assurance. The exact cause of the arrest remains unknown, but he may have been suspected of corresponding with the king's supporters. It is highly probable that he did so, for, until the Restoration of 1660, he was regularly in communication with the Royalists, while serving the parliament or Cromwell, so long as their service was profitable, and making no scruple of applying for grants of the confiscated lands of the king's Irish friends.

After 1650, Penn served as commander-in-chief of the southern fleet, operating in the Atlantic and the Mediterranean against Royalists forces led by Prince Rupert. After an action at Macroom in County Cork, Ireland, he was awarded Macroom Castle. He was so active on this service that when he returned home on 18 March 1651, he claimed to have spent more than a year without setting foot ashore.

In the First Anglo-Dutch War (1652–1654), he served in the navy of the Commonwealth of England, commanding squadrons at the battles of the Kentish Knock (1652), Portland, the Gabbard and Scheveningen (1653). During his battle, a marksman aboard Penn's ship killed Dutch admiral and fleet commander Maarten Tromp on the Dutch flagship Brederode.

In 1654, he offered to carry the fleet over to Charles II of England, but in October of the same year he had no scruple in accepting the naval command in the expedition to the West Indies sent out by Cromwell. In 1655, he commanded the fleet that launched a unsuccessful attack on the Spanish colony of La Hispaniola. He was not responsible for the shameful repulse at Santo Domingo, which was due to a panic among the troops. Jamaica was ruled by the heirs of Christopher Columbus, until gradually the Catholic Church grew to dominate the island. The crypto-Jewish population following the strengthening of the church aided the English who seized the less desirable island for the Commonwealth régime, and Penn established the Jamaica Station there. On their return, he and his military colleague, Robert Venables, were imprisoned in the Tower of London. He made a humble submission, and when released retired to the estates of confiscated land he had received in Ireland. On 20 December 1658, Penn was knighted by Henry Cromwell at Dublin Castle, but the Protectorate honour passed into oblivion at the Restoration in May 1660.

=== Political career ===
In April 1660, Penn was elected as a Members of Parliament for Weymouth and Melcombe Regis and sat in the Convention Parliament. He played a small part in the Restoration: in May 1660 he was on the Earl of Sandwich's ship, the Naseby, which was sent to bring King Charles II home to England from his exile at Amsterdam in the Dutch Republic. During the voyage, Penn became acquainted with the Duke of York, who was soon to be appointed Lord High Admiral. Penn later had a lasting influence on him.

In 1661, Penn was re-elected as the Member of Parliament for Weymouth and Melcombe Regis in the Cavalier Parliament. In the Second Anglo-Dutch War, he was flag captain at the Battle of Lowestoft (1665), serving under James, Duke of York, and later in the same year was admiral of one of the fleets sent to intercept Ruyter, despite suffering from gout.

Although Penn was not a high-minded man, he is a figure of considerable importance in English naval history. As admiral and General at Sea for Parliament, he helped in 1653 to draw up the first code of tactics provided for the English navy, Duties of a Commander at Sea, 1664, Instructions by Sir W. Penn. It became the basis of the "Duke of York's Sailing and Fighting Instructions", which remained an important guide to naval tactics for many years. Penn was an early proponent of fighting in line ahead, so as to bring as much firepower as possible to bear.

=== Legacy ===
Penn's memorial in St Mary Redcliffe church in Bristol

A key source for the adult life of Penn is the diary of his colleague at the Navy Board, and next door neighbour in Seething Lane, Samuel Pepys. However, Pepys's assessments should be considered to light of his apparent jealousy towards Penn.

In 1660, Penn was appointed a Commissioner of the Navy Board, where he worked with Pepys, Clerk of the Acts. The character of "mean fellow", or "false knave", given him by Pepys is borne out by much that is otherwise known of him. He also was an excellent seaman and a good fighter. Like Pepys and the Earl of Sandwich, Penn was a "moderate" Roundhead who succeeded in maintaining his position at the Restoration. Penn appears several times in Pepys's diary. A typical entry from 5 April 1666 reads, "To the office, where the falsenesse and impertinencies of Sir W. Pen would make a man mad to think of."

He is also referenced in an entry from 1665, which states, "At night home and up to the leads [roof], were contrary to expectation driven down again with a stinke by Sir W. Pen's shying of a shitten pot in their house of office".

The diary entry for 4 July 1666 includes a long account of Penn's analysis of what was to be learned from the Four Days' Battle, which ended with the statement, "He did talk very rationally to me, insomuch that I took more pleasure this night in hearing him discourse then I ever did in my life in anything that he said."

As a native of the West Country, Sir William Penn was buried in the church of St Mary Redcliffe in Bristol. His helm and half-armour are hung on the wall, together with the tattered banners of Dutch ships that he captured in battle. His portrait by Lely, part of the Flagmen of Lowestoft series, is in the Painted Hall at Greenwich. After his death, his son, William, accepted the grant of land in the American colonies in lieu of money owed by the Crown to his father. William Penn had wanted to call the land "New Wales", which was objected to by the Secretary of State, Privy Council member and Welshman Leoline Jenkins. Penn instead put forward the name "Sylvania". The Council then chose to tweak this new name a bit by adding the prefix "Penn" to honour the late Admiral, William Penn's father. After some protestation from William Penn, he reluctantly accepted it.

== Personal life ==
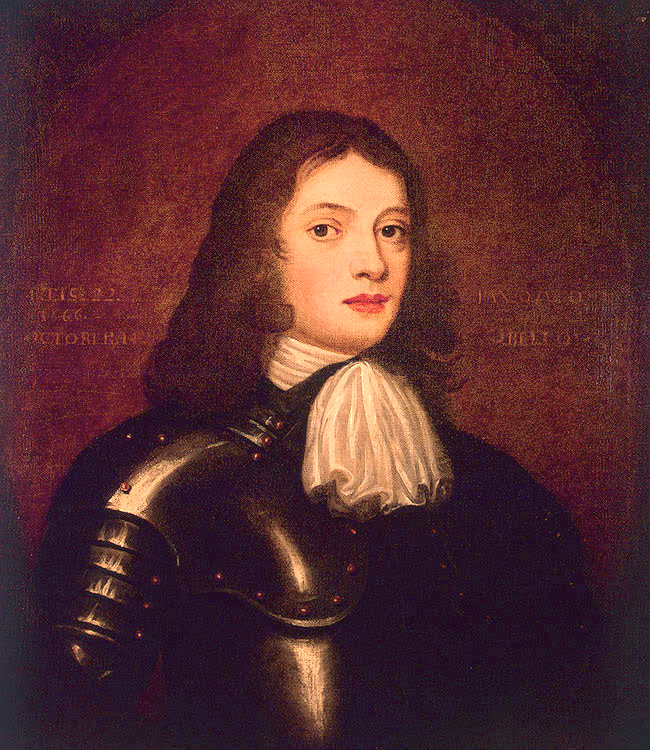
Penn's son William at 22 years old in 1666; he later founded the Province of Pennsylvania, one of the initial Thirteen Colonies in British America

On 6 June 1643, he married Margaret Jasper, the daughter of John Jasper, a wealthy Dutch merchant from Rotterdam. They had three children:

- William Penn (1644–1718), who married Gulielma Maria Springett (1644–1694), and later, Hannah Margaret Callowhill (1671–1726)
- Margaret "Pegg" Penn, who married Anthony Lowther
- Richard Penn

== Sources ==
- Cundall, Frank (1915). Historic Jamaica. West India Committee.
- Ferris, John. P. (1983), "Penn, William (1621–70), of the Navy Office, London and Wanstead, Essex.", in Henning, B.D. (ed.), The History of Parliament: the House of Commons 1660–1690, Boydell and Brewer
- Jenkins, Howard M. (1896), "The Family of William Penn", The Pennsylvania Magazine of History and Biography, vol. XX, [Philadelphia] Historical Society of Pennsylvania, pp. 1–29
- Shaw, William Arthur (1906), The Knights of England: A complete record from the earliest time to the present day of the knights of all the orders of chivalry in England, Scotland, and Ireland, and of knights bachelors, incorporating a complete list of knights bachelors dubbed in Ireland, vol. 2, London: Sherratt and Hughes
- Street, Lucie (1986). An Uncommon Sailor: A Portrait of Admiral Sir William Penn (1st ed.). Bourne End, Buckinghamshire: The Kensal Press. p. 112. ISBN 0-946041-47-4.

Attribution
