= African diaspora religions =

Religions of the African diaspora

African diaspora religions, also described as Afro-American religions, are a number of related beliefs that developed in the Americas in various areas of the Caribbean, Latin America, and the Southern United States. They derive from traditional African religions with some influence from other religious traditions, notably Christianity and Islam.

== Characteristics ==
Afro-American religions share a number of beliefs and practices. Central beliefs include ancestor veneration and include a creator deity along with a pantheon of divine spirits such as the Orisha, Loa, Vodun, Nkisi, and Alusi, among others. In addition to the religious syncretism of these various African traditions, many also incorporate elements of folk Catholicism including folk saints and other forms of folk religion, Native American religion, Spiritism, Spiritualism, Shamanism (sometimes including the use of Entheogens), and European folklore.

Various "doctoring" spiritual traditions also exist such as Obeah and Hoodoo which focus on spiritual health. African religious traditions in the Americas can vary. They can have non-prominent African roots or can be almost wholly African in nature, such as religions like Trinidad Orisha.

== African diaspora religions in the present ==
The nature and composition of the African diaspora have undergone significant changes over time: from the forced migration of African captives of the Old and New Worlds to the voluntary emigration of free, skilled Africans in search of political asylum or economic opportunities; from a diaspora with little contact with the point of origin (Africa) to one that maintains active contact with the mother continent, all culminating in the birth of a unique African who straddles continents, worlds and cultures.

== Defining diasporas ==
There are several difficulties in defining the African diaspora—indeed, in defining the term diaspora. Often, the term diaspora is used in a fuzzy, ahistorical and uncritical manner in which all manner of movements and migrations between countries and even within countries are included and inadequate attention is paid to the historical conditions and experiences that produce diasporic communities and consciousness—how dispersed populations become self-conscious diaspora communities.

== List of Afro-American ADRs ==
=== The Bahamas ===
- Haitian Vodou
- Obeah
- Rastafari

=== Belize ===
- Dugu Obeah

=== Brazil ===
- Batuque
- Cabula
- Candomblé
  - Candomblé Bantu
  - Candomblé Jejé
  - Candomblé Ketu
- Jarê
- Omolokô
- Quimbanda
- Tambor de Mina
- Terecô
- Umbanda
- Xangô de Recife

=== Colombia ===
- Alabaos
- Colombian Yuyu
- Lumbalú

=== Cuba ===
- Arará religion
- Cuban Vodú
- Palo
- Regla de Ocha (aka. Santería)
- Ganga-Longoba
- Espiritismo

=== Curaçao ===
- Montamentu

=== Dominican Republic ===
- Dominican Vudú

=== Grenada ===
- Big Drum Dance (Gwa Tambu)

=== Guatemala (Garifuna) ===
- Dugu

=== Guyana ===
- Comfa
- Obeah

=== Haiti ===
- Haitian Vodou
- Ibo loa

=== Honduras ===
- Dugu

=== Jamaica ===
- Convince
- Jamaican Maroon religion
  - Kromanti dance
- Kumina
- Myal
- Obeah
- Rastafari
  - Bobo Ashanti
  - Nyabinghi
  - Twelve Tribes of Israel

=== Nicaragua ===
- Dugu

=== Puerto Rico ===
- Sansé Espiritismo

=== Saint Lucia ===
- Rastafari
- Kélé
- Obeah

=== Suriname ===
- Winti

=== Trinidad and Tobago ===
- Obeah
- Rastafari
- Spiritual Baptist
- Trinidad Orisha
- Vodunu

=== United States ===
- Hoodoo
- Louisiana Voodoo
- Spiritual church movement
- Espiritismo
- African Theological Archministry

=== Venezuela ===
- María Lionza
- Birongo

== List of Afro-Asian ADRs ==
=== Pakistan ===
- Sheedi Mela

=== Iran ===
- Zār

=== India ===
- Dhamaal
- Kappiri Muthappan

== See also ==
- Black theology
- Ring shout
- Traditional African religions
- African diaspora in the Americas
