= Kromanti dance =

Jamaican Maroon religious ceremony

Kromanti dance or Kromanti play (capitalised to Kromanti Dance or Kromanti Play) is a Jamaican Maroon religious ceremony practiced by Jamaican Maroons. It is rooted in traditional African music and religious practices, especially those of the Asante people of Ghana. The name Kromanti (or Coromantee) derives from Kormantin (or Cormantin ) where a historical slave fort in the coast of Ghana was located. Kormantin was the home of the rivals of inland Asantes and their allies who were captured. The captives the British called Kromanti. Many slaves shipped to Jamaica during the Atlantic Slave trade originated from present–day Ghana in West Africa.

The pure form of Kromanti dance is not one of those contemporary dances of Jamaica, neither is it a Jamaican party or hall dance, but a sacred dance based on the tenets of traditional African religious practices. Although the dance has influenced some aspects of Jamaican culture, and is still practiced today, the religious aspects of the dance are no longer performed as in the past—due to Jamaican Maroons' conversion to Christianity. Despite its modern twist, it is still concerned with solving problems of day-to-day life, such as illnesses resulting from spirit possessions, infidelity, and any other life problems. The Maroons viewed Kromanti dance as a form of metaphorical warfare, a protection on a spiritual level rather than a physical one.

== Rituals ==
The ritualistic aspects of Kromanti dance involves a "distinctive music and dance styles" which is "centered around possession by ancestral spirits."

Some of the surviving elements derived from African tradition are Country, a music style that uses a drum language like the Dondo, in order to play songs and proverbs; and healing, which is achieved through a rhythmic dance, music, and possession. Like "many other African-derived healing ceremonies, a possessed medium attends to patients, employing song, dance, sacrifice, and herbal remedies."

The Kromanti dance usually begins after nightfall and continues until daybreak. After several hours, the dance loses its recreational momentum and the chief "fete-man" (ritual specialist, similar to an African high priest) becomes possessed.

== See also ==
- Akan religion
- Obeah
- Jamaican Maroon Creole
- Kumina
- Convince
- Nyame
