= Dread & Alive =

Multimedia series

- cover art for Dread and Alive #1 (February 2010) by Rodney Buchemi

Publication information
- Publisher: Zoolook
- Publication date: February 2010

Creative team
- Created by: Nicholas Da Silva known professionally as Zoolook

Dread & Alive is a Jamaican-inspired multimedia series spanning comic books, novels, and reggae music created and written by Nicholas Da Silva, a multidisciplinary artist and musician known professionally as Zoolook. Zoolook is also the founder and editor-in-chief of Irie magazine. Dread & Alive follows Drew McIntosh before, during and after being empowered by a sacred amulet created by the ancient Jamaican Maroons.

== Publication history ==
Its creator, Nicholas Da Silva, known professionally as Zoolook, conceptualized the Dread & Alive series. It is the first superhero comic book with a Jamaican as the protagonist thus making it culturally relevant and boldly revolutionary in its undertaking. It's also noted as the first reggae comic book with a reggae soundtrack.

=== Release ===
The first issue of the Dread & Alive comic book series was released on February 6, 2010, on the birthday of international reggae icon Bob Marley. The series is also one of the first of its kind to undertake charity 30% of all digital sales, and 10% of all print sales from Issue #1 will go toward non-profit group HELP Jamaica!

The series also planned a release on a compact disk featuring reggae acts such as Third World (band), Sahra Indio, Sly and Robbie, Shaggy (musician) and Freddy Locks.

=== Music ===
The first compilation CD 'Dread & Alive: The Lost Tapes Vol.1' saw release on September 14, 2010. Since release it has met with high praise, being described as "History in the making" , “a very STRONG compilation… one of the better lineups of the year.” and “new territory in the collusion of art and Jamaican music”. The CD is designed to be heard either alongside Da Silva's reggae comic book, or, as a special, standalone musical event.

Dread & Alive the Lost Tapes vol.2 was released on October 19, 2010

On January 6, 2019, Nicholas Da Silva released the single "Trod" under his artist name, ZOOLOOK. It is the first track from the next story arc in the Dread & Alive series entitled From Babylon to Zion.

=== Publicity and promotions ===
In order to promote the series Zoolook teamed with Reggae Festival Guide to give away an 8GB iPod Touch to one of the members of the Facebook group.

For Dread & Alive: The Lost Tapes vol.1 a series of interviews were done with World of Black Heroes to coincide with the launch.

In January 2018, Zoolook began writing the next installment of his Dread & Series, a 12 chapter story arc entitled Nine Night. The series includes a soundtrack series in the form of a reggae version of a rock opera. Chapter 1 titled 'Hide Your Soul' part 1, was scheduled to release in February 2021 for Black History Month. News of the project has caught the attention of mainstream media.

On September 7, 2015, Zoolook was featured on Afro-punk.

On June 20, 2018, he was featured on WBEZ's Worldview as one of 7 Black And Latinx Writers Working In Comics Today.

On June 20, 2018, he was interviewed on WBEZ's Worldview by Galilee Abdullah - Black Comic Books: Nicholas Da Silva and Global Roots.

On October 9, 2020, Dread & Alive was featured in Jamaica Animation Nation Network's 'Caribbean Comics'.

A Dread & Alive maxi-series, Nine Night, was announbced in February 2021!

== Characters ==
- Drew Mcintosh - The conquering lion and protagonist. He has dreadlocks like the members of the Rastafari movement though his beliefs are from the Jamaican Maroons and the Ashanti empire.
- Cudjoe - Drew's mentor and leader of the Maroons of Jamaica and Myal man.
- Shadowcatcher - The evil antagonist Obeah man.
- Maria Mcintosh - Mother of our hero and his only surviving parent. Maria harbors a dark secret. She comes from a long line of Obeah woman skilled in the arts of obeah that traces back to the Ashanti empire.
- Philip Mcintosh - Father of our hero and legendary Myal man and duppy conqueror.
- Brandy Savage - The love interest of the protagonist.
