= Coromantee =

Afro-Caribbean ethnic group

Coromantee Coromantins, Kromanti, Kromantse
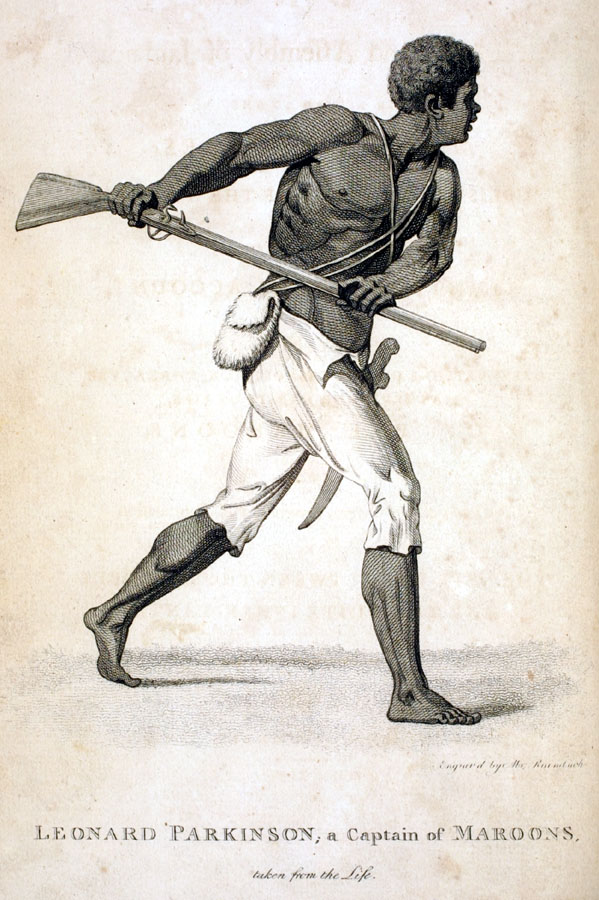
- Leonard Parkinson, Maroon leader, Jamaica, 1796. Engraving by Abraham Raimbach.

Regions with significant populations
- Ghana, Jamaica, Suriname

Languages
- Current: Jamaican English, Jamaican Patois, Maroon Spirit language Historical: Akan, Twi

Religion
- Current: Christianity and Revivalism; Historical: Kumfu, Obeah

Related ethnic groups
- Akan, Fanti, Ashanti, Afro-Jamaicans

Coromantee, Coromantin, Coromanti, Kormantine, Kromantyn or Kromanti (derived from the name of the Ghanaian slave fort Fort Kormantine in the Ghanaian town of Kormantse, Central Ghana) is an English-language term for enslaved people from the Akan ethnic group, taken from the Gold Coast region in modern-day Ghana.

== Etymology ==
The name, in both Jamaica and Suriname, is derived from the Fanti town of their imprisonment known as Kormantse. The Fantes and British captured their rivals the Asantes and these captives were sent to British colonies such as Jamaica. While Dutch Komenada Fantes allied themselves to capture British allied Fantes who were sent to Dutch colonies such as Suriname.

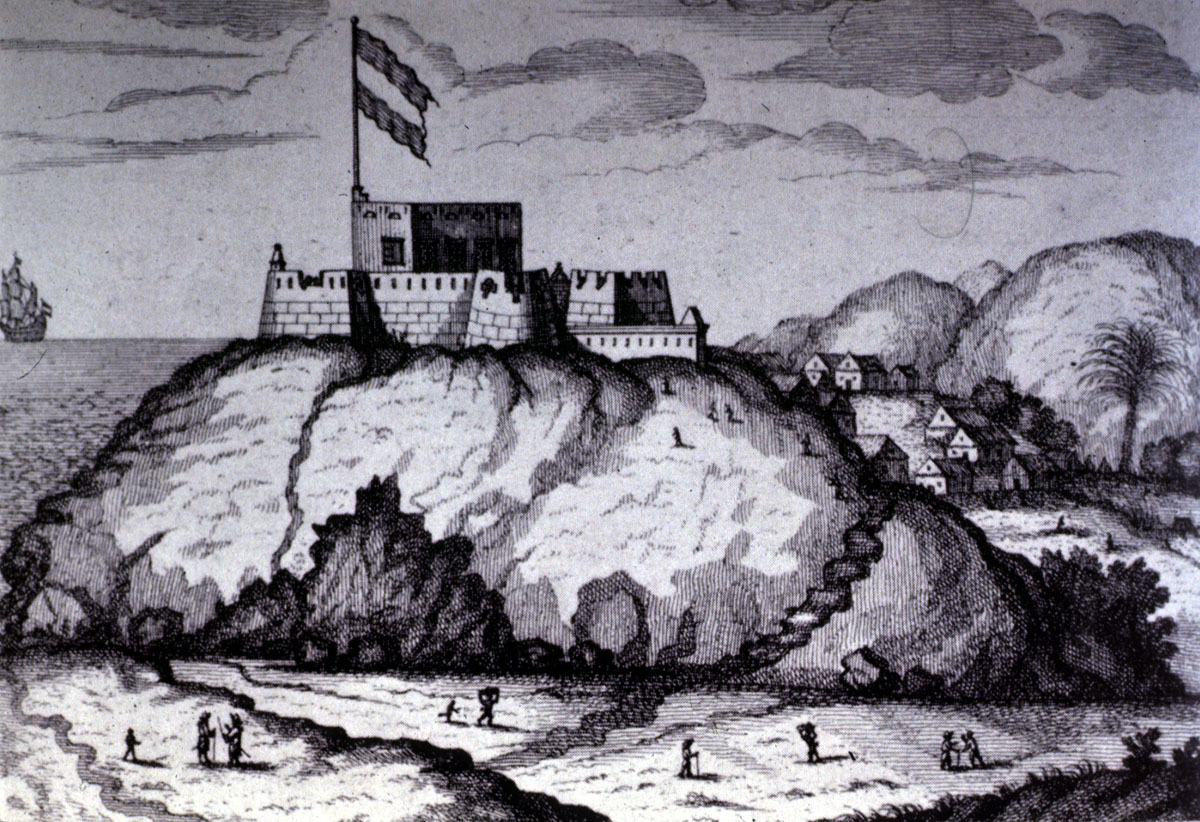
Historic representation of Fort Amsterdam (Fort Kormantin) in Ghana

Due to their militaristic background, Coromantins organized dozens of slave rebellions in Jamaica and elsewhere in the Americas. Their fierce and rebellious nature became so notorious among European slave traders in the 18th century that an Act was proposed to ban the importation of Akan people from the Gold Coast despite their reputation as strong workers.

Most European slave merchants came to understand that the Akan, while primarily peaceful and hardworking, were a proud and fiercely independent people who fought vehemently to protect their vast territories from encroachment by other expanding groups and also fought off the Dutch, Prussians, and Portuguese.

== History ==
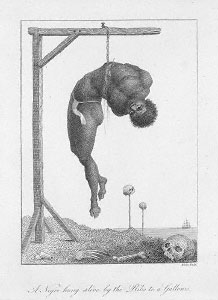
An engraving by William Blake illustrating "A negro hung by his ribs from a gallows", from Captain John Stedman's Narrative of a Five Years Expedition Against the Revolted Negroes of Surinam, 1792

=== 1690 rebellion ===
Several rebellions in the 1700s were attributed to Coromantees. According to enslaver and colonial administrator Edward Long, the first rebellion occurred in 1690 between three or four hundred enslaved people in Clarendon Parish, Jamaica, who, after killing a white owner, seized firearms and provisions and killed an overseer at the neighbouring plantation. A militia formed and eventually suppressed the rebellion, hanging the leader. Several rebels fled and joined the Maroons. Long also describes the incident where an enslaver was overpowered by a group of Coromantees who, after killing him, cut off his head and turned his skull into a drinking bowl. However, the "drinking of blood" is more than likely anti-African propaganda, though Coromantee and especially Asante war tactics were known to use fear in their opponents. In 1739, the leader of the Western Maroons, Cudjoe (Prince Kojo), signed a treaty with the British, ensuring the Maroons would be left alone, provided they did not help other slave rebellions.

=== 1712 New York Slave Revolt ===
On the night of 6 April 1712, a group of more than twenty black enslaved people, the majority of whom were believed to be Coromantee, set fire to a building on Maiden Lane near Broadway. While the white traffickers tried to put out the fire, the enslaved blacks, armed with guns, hatchets, and swords, defended themselves from the whites and then ran off. Eight whites died, and seven were wounded. Over the next few days, colonial forces arrested seventy black people and jailed them. Twenty-seven were put on trial, 21 of whom were convicted and sentenced to death.

=== 1731 First Maroon War ===
Led by Cudjoe and Queen Nanny (Kojo and Nana), the First Maroon War was a conflict between Maroons in Jamaica and the colonial British authorities that reached a climax in 1731. In 1739–40, the British government in Jamaica recognized that it could not defeat the Maroons, so they agreed with them instead. The Maroons were to remain in their five main towns: Accompong, Cudjoe's Town (Trelawny Town), Moore Town (formerly New Nanny Town), Scott's Hall (Jamaica) and Charles Town, Jamaica, living under their own rulers and a British supervisor.

=== 1733 Slave Insurrection ===
The 1733 slave insurrection on St. John in the Danish West Indies (now St. John, United States Virgin Islands) started on 23 November 1733, when 150 enslaved Africans from (present-day Ghana) revolted against the owners and managers of the island's plantations. Lasting several months into August 1734, the slave rebellion was one of the earliest and longest slave revolts in the Americas. The Akwamu enslaved people captured the fort in Coral Bay and took control of most of the island. They intended to resume crop production under their own authority and use Africans of other tribes as slave labor.

Planters regained control by the end of May 1734, after the Akwamu were defeated by several hundred better-armed French and Swiss troops sent in April from Martinique, a French colony. The colonial militia continued to hunt down maroons and finally declared the rebellion at an end in late August 1734.

=== 1736 Antigua slave rebellion ===
In 1736, on the island of Antigua, an enslaved African known as Prince Klaas (whose real name was thought to be Court or Kwaku Takyi) planned an uprising in which whites would be massacred. Court was crowned "King of the Coromantees" in a pasture outside the capital of St. John's, in what white observers thought was a colourful spectacle, but was for the Africans a ritual declaration of war on the white enslavers. Due to information obtained from other enslaved people, colonists discovered and suppressed the plot. Prince Klaas and four accomplices were caught and executed by the breaking wheel. They hung and starved six Africans and burnt another 58 at the stake. The site of these executions is now the Antigua Recreation Ground.

=== 1741 New York Conspiracy ===
In 1741, a supposed plot of arson in the Province of New York was allegedly conducted by three enslaved men, Cuffee, Prince, and Caesar. These three men were alleged to have burned several buildings, including the home of Lieutenant Governor George Clarke. The leaders, Cuffee and Quack (Kwaku), were tried for arson, found guilty, and burned at the stake. In total, they burnt 13 black men at the stake and hung 17, along with four whites. Among those arrested when the plot was discovered were 12 men and women of Akan origin. Seventy people were deported from New York. There is considerable historical debate as to how these fires were started.

=== 1760 Tacky’s War ===
In 1760, another conspiracy known as Tacky's War was hatched. Long claims that almost all enslaved Coromantin on the island were involved without any suspicion from the whites. They planned to overthrow British rule and establish an African kingdom in Jamaica. Tacky and his forces were able to take over several plantations and kill the white plantation owners. However, they were ultimately betrayed by an enslaved man named Yankee, whom Long describes as wanting to defend his master's house and "assist the white men". Yankee ran to the neighbouring estate and, with the help of another enslaved man, alerted the rest of the plantation owners. The British enlisted the help of Jamaican Maroons, who were themselves descendants of the Akan ethnic group, to defeat the Coromantins. Long describes a British man and a Mulatto man as each having killed three Coromantins.

Eventually, Tacky was killed by a sharpshooter named Davy the Maroon, who was a Maroon officer in Scott's Hall.

=== 1763 Berbice Slave Uprising ===
In 1763, a slave rebellion in Berbice, in present-day Guyana, was led by a Coromantin man named Cuffy and his deputy Accara. The slave rebellion lasted from February 1763 into 1764. Cuffy was born in West Africa before being trafficked and enslaved. He led a revolt of more than 2,500 against the colony's regime. After acquiring firearms, the rebels attacked plantations. They gained an advantage after taking the house of Peereboom. They told the whites inside that they could leave, but the rebels killed many as they did and took several prisoners, including the wife of a plantation owner, whom Cuffy kept as his wife.

After several months, a dispute between Cuffy and Accara led to a war. On 2 April 1763, Cuffy wrote to Governor van Hoogenheim saying that he did not want a war against the whites and proposed a partition of Berbice with the whites occupying the coastal areas and the blacks the interior. Akara's faction won, and Cuffy killed himself. The anniversary of Cuffy's slave rebellion, 23 February, is Republic Day in Guyana, and Cuffy is a national hero commemorated in a large monument in the capital, Georgetown.

=== 1765 Conspiracy ===
Coromantee enslaved people were also behind a conspiracy in 1765 to revolt. The leaders of the rebellion sealed their pact with an oath. Coromantee leaders Blackwell and Quamin (Kwame) ambushed and killed a group of colonial militiamen at a fort near Port Maria, Jamaica, as well as other whites in the area. They intended to ally with the Maroons to split up the island. The Coromantins were to give the Maroons the forests while the Coromantins would control the cultivated land. The Maroons did not agree because of their treaty and existing agreement with colonial government.

=== Anti-Coromantee measures ===
In 1765, a bill was proposed to prevent the importation of Coromantees but was not passed. Edward Long, an anti-Coromantee writer, states:

Such a bill, if passed into law would have struck at very root of evil. No more Coromantins would have been brought to infest this country, but instead of their savage race, the island would have been supplied with Blacks of a more docile tractable disposition and better inclined to peace and agriculture.

Colonists later devised ways of separating Coromantins from each other by housing them separately, placing them with other enslaved people, and stricter monitoring. Since groups such as the Igbos were hardly reported to have been maroons, Igbo women were paired with Coromantee men to subdue the latter due to the idea that Igbo women were bound to their first-born sons' birthplace.

=== 1766 Rebellion ===
Thirty-three newly arrived Coromantins killed at least 19 whites in Westmoreland Parish, Jamaica. It was discovered when a young enslaved girl gave up their plans. All of the conspirators were either executed or sold.

=== 1795 Second Maroon War ===
The Second Maroon War of 1795–1796 was an eight-month conflict between the Maroons of Trelawney Town, a maroon settlement created at the end of the First Maroon War, located in the parish of St James, but named after governor Edward Trelawny, and the British colonials who controlled the island. The other Jamaican Maroon communities did not participate in this rebellion, and their treaty with the British remained in place.

=== 1816 Bussa's Rebellion in Barbados ===
Barbados was also a central commercial point to which enslaved people from the Gold Coast were imported before further dispersal to other British colonies such as Jamaica and British Guiana. Enslaved people were imported from the Gold Coast to Barbados from the 17th century onward to about the early 19th century. The slave revolt on 14 April 1816 in Barbados, also known as the Bussa's Rebellion, was led by an enslaved man named Bussa. Not much is known about his life before the revolt; scholars today are currently debating his possible origins. Bussa was likely a Coromantee, yet there is also reasonable speculation that he may have descended from the Igbo peoples of modern-day south-eastern Nigeria. It is also possible that Bussa had both ancestries since enslaved peoples trafficked before the rebellion (mid- to late 16th-century shift in colonial demand for enslaved Africans from the Slave Coast) were kidnapped primarily from the Gold Coast and underwent subsequent creolization of the island's enslaved African population. The Bussa's Rebellion, along with other persistent slave rebellions throughout the Caribbean, had given the British Colonial government a further incentive to pass and enact the Slavery Abolition Act 1833, officially abolishing slavery as an institution in all of its Caribbean territories.

=== 1822 Denmark Vesey conspiracy ===
In 1822, an alleged conspiracy by enslaved Africans in the United States brought from the Caribbean was organized by an enslaved man named Denmark Vesey or Telemaque. Historian Douglas Egerton suggested that Vesey could be of Coromantee origin, based on remembrance by a free black carpenter who knew Vesey toward the end of his life. Inspired by the revolutionary spirit and actions of enslaved Africans during the 1791 Haitian Revolution and furious at the closing of the African Church, Vesey began to plan a slave rebellion.

His insurrection, which was to take place on Bastille Day, 14 July 1822, became known to thousands of blacks throughout Charleston, South Carolina, and along the Carolina coast. The plot called for Vesey and his group of enslaved people and free blacks to execute their enslavers and temporarily liberate the city of Charleston. Vesey and his followers planned to sail to Haiti to escape retaliation. Two enslaved men opposed to Vesey's scheme leaked the plot. Charleston authorities charged 131 men with conspiracy. In total, 67 men were convicted and 35 hanged, including Denmark Vesey.

=== 1823 Demerara Rebellion ===
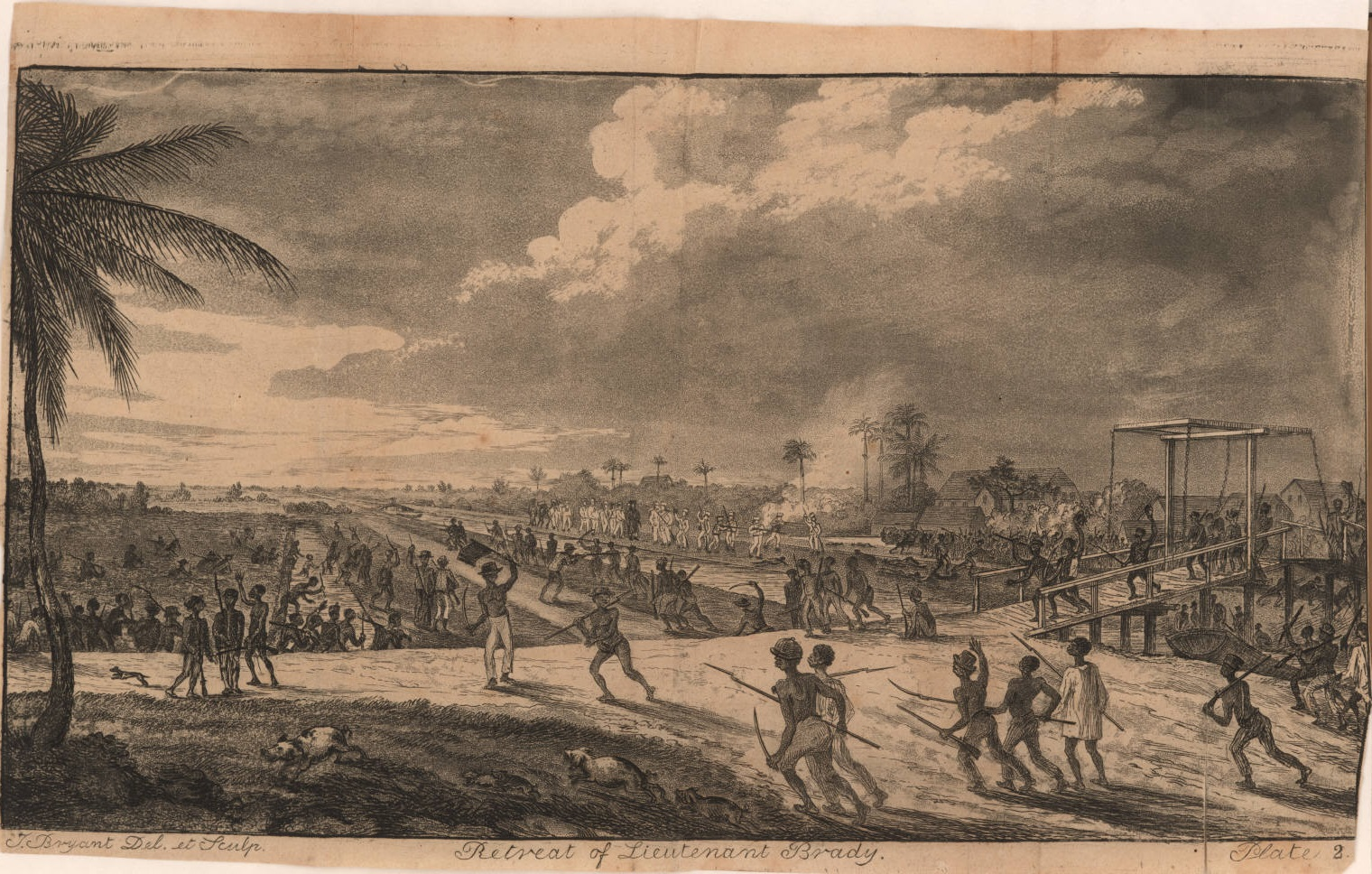
Slaves force the retreat of European soldiers led by Lt. Brady in Guyana.

Quamina (Kwamina) Gladstone, a Coromantee enslaved man in British Guiana (now Guyana), and his son Jack Gladstone led the Demerara rebellion of 1823, one of the most significant slave revolts in the British colonies before slavery was abolished. He was a carpenter by trade and worked on an estate owned by Sir John Gladstone. He was implicated in the revolt by the colonial authorities, apprehended, and executed on 16 September 1823. He is considered a national hero in Guyana, and there are streets named after him in Georgetown and the village of Beterverwagting on the East Coast Demerara.

On Monday, 18 August 1823, Quamina and Jack Gladstone, both enslaved on Success Plantation – who had adopted the surname of their master by convention – led their peers to revolt against the harsh conditions and mistreatment. Those on Le Resouvenir, where John Smith's chapel was situated, also rebelled. Quamina Gladstone was a member of Smith's church, and the population there included: 2,500 whites, 2,500 freed blacks, and 77,000 enslaved people; Quamina had been one of five chosen to become deacons by the congregation soon after Smith's arrival. Following the arrival of news from Britain that measures aimed at improving the treatment of enslaved people in the colonies had been passed, Jack had heard a rumour that their masters had received instructions to set them free but were refusing to do so. In the weeks before the revolt, he sought confirmation of the veracity of the rumours from other enslaved people, particularly those who worked for those in a position to know: he thus obtained information from Susanna, housekeeper/mistress of John Hamilton of Le Resouvenir; from Daniel, the Governor's servant; Joe Simpson from Le Reduit, and others. Specifically, Joe Simpson had written a letter saying their freedom was imminent, which heeded them to be patient. Jack wrote a letter (signing his father's name) to the members of the chapel informing them of the "new law".

Being very close to Jack, he supported his son's aspirations to be free by supporting the fight for the rights of enslaved people. But being a rational man, and heeding the advice of Smith, he urged him to tell the other enslaved people, particularly the Christians, not to rebel. He sent Manuel and Seaton on this mission. When he knew the rebellion was imminent, he urged restraint and made his fellow slaves promise a peaceful strike. Jack led tens of thousands of enslaved people to rise against their enslavers. After the enslaved people's defeat in a major battle at Bachelor's Adventure, Jack fled into the woods. A "handsome reward" of one thousand guilders was offered for the capture of Jack, Quamina, and about twenty other "fugitives". Jack and his wife were captured by Capt. McTurk at Chateau Margo on 6 September after a three-hour standoff. Quamina remained at large until he was captured on 16 September in the fields of Chateau Margo. He was executed, and his body was hung up in chains by the side of a public road in front of Success.

== Culture ==
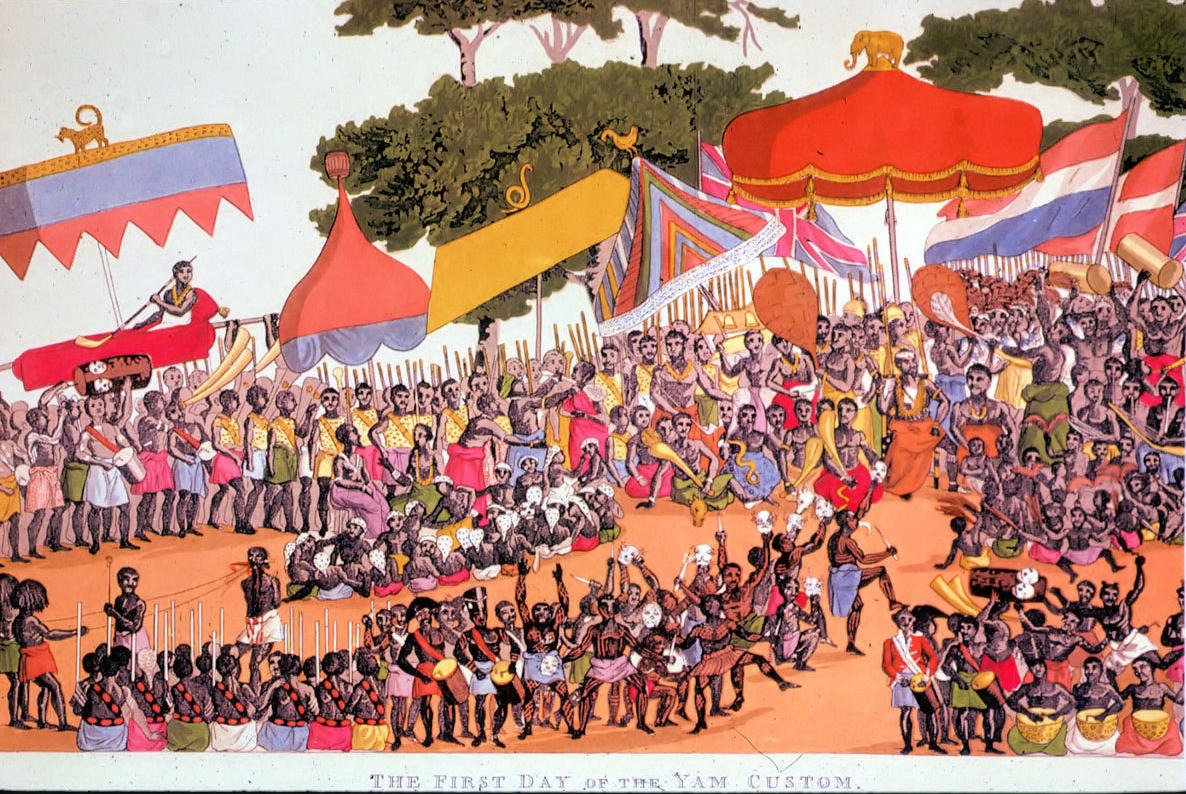
Ashanti yam ceremony, Asanteman. A painting of a yam ceremony from 1817. Thomas Edward Bowdich.

Before becoming enslaved, Coromantins were usually part of highly organized and stratified Akan groups such as the Asante Empire and the Fante Confederacy. Akan states were not all the same, but the 40 groups in the mid-17th century shared a common political language and culture. These groups also had shared mythology – and a single, supreme God, Nyame – and Anansi stories. These stories spread to the New World and became Anancy, Anansi Drew, or Br'er Rabbit stories in Jamaica, The Bahamas, and the Southern United States, respectively.

According to Long, Akan or "Coromantee" culture obliterated any other African customs, and incoming non-Akan Africans had to submit to the culture of the dominant Akan population in Jamaica. Akan deities referred to as Abosom in the Twi and Fante dialects were documented, and enslaved Akans would praise Nyankopong (erroneously written by the British as Accompong); libations would be poured to Asase Yaa (erroneously written as "Assarci") and Bosom Epo the sea god. Bonsam was referred to as the god of evil. The John Canoe festival was created in Jamaica and the Caribbean by enslaved Akans who sided with the man known as John Canoe. John Canoe was a man from Axim, Ghana, an Akan from the Ahanta. He was a soldier for the Germans until one day, he turned his back on them for his Ahanta people and sided with Nzima and Dutch Fante troops to take the area from the Germans and other Europeans. The news of his victory reached Jamaica, and he was celebrated ever since that Christmas of 1708 when he had first defeated German forces for Axim. Twenty years later, his stronghold was broken by neighboring Fante forces supported by English merchants. This resulted in the Ahanta, Nzima and Asante warriors becoming captives of the Fante and being taken to Jamaica as prisoners of war, numbering some 20,000 men.

=== Day names ===
Akans also shared the concept of the soul or day names. Evidence of this is seen in the names of several rebellion organizers such as Cuffy (Kofi), Cudjoe (Kojo), or Nanny (Nana) Bump. Names of some notable Coromantee leaders – such as Cudjoe, Cuffy, and Quamina – correspond to the Akan day names Kojo, Kwame, Kofi, and Kwamena, respectively. The word maroon became the Jamaican English term to mean "black person". Similarly, a white individual was called "obroni" (Akan) by the enslaved populace. The word Obroni became Browning to refer to white or bi-racial lighter skinned individuals.

=== Assimilation ===
Other Coromantee revolts followed, but these were all quickly suppressed. Coromantees (enslaved and runaway Maroons) and their Akan, imported from Ghana (the Gold Coast), ultimately influenced most of the black Jamaican culture: language, architecture, and food. After the British abolition of slavery in 1833, their influence and reputation began to wane as Coromantins were fully integrated into the larger British-influenced Jamaican society.

However, Akan loanwords make up the most significant part of the African influence in Jamaican patois. Also, Patois has Akan arrangement and grammar. The Akan language has also influenced the Jamaican Maroon population with their Maroon Spirit language.

== In fiction ==
Oroonoko: or, the Royal Slave is a relatively short work of prose fiction by Aphra Behn (1640–1689), published in 1688, concerning the love of its hero, an enslaved African in Surinam in the 1660s, and the author's own experiences in the new South American colony. Oroonoko is the grandson of a Coromantin African king, Prince Oroonoko, who falls in love with Imoinda, the daughter of that king's top general.

The king, too, falls in love with Imoinda. He gives her the sacred veil, thus commanding her to become one of his wives, even though she has already married Oroonoko. After unwillingly spending time in the king's harem (the Otan), Imoinda and Oroonoko plan a tryst with the help of the sympathetic Onahal and Aboan. They are eventually discovered, and because she has lost her virginity, Imoinda is sold into slavery. The king's guilt, however, leads him to falsely inform Oroonoko that she has been executed since death was thought to be better than slavery. Later, after winning another tribal war, Oroonoko is betrayed and captured by an English captain who plans to enslave him and his men. The captain transports both Imoinda and Oroonoko to the colony of Surinam. The two lovers are reunited there, under the new Christian names of Caesar and Clemene, even though Imoinda's beauty has attracted the unwanted desires of other enslaved people and the Cornish gentleman, Trefry.

Upon Imoinda's pregnancy, Oroonoko petitions for their return to the homeland. But after being continuously ignored, he organizes a slave revolt. The enslaved people are hunted down by the military forces and compelled to surrender on Deputy Governor Byam's promise of amnesty. Yet, when the enslaved people surrender, Oroonoko and the others are punished and whipped. Oroonoko decides to kill Byam to avenge his honor and express his natural worth. But to protect Imoinda from violation and subjugation after his death, he decides to kill her. The two lovers discuss the plan, and with a smile on her face, Imoinda willingly dies by his hand. A few days later, Oroonoko is found mourning by her decapitated body and is kept from killing himself, only to be publicly executed. During his death by dismemberment, Oroonoko calmly smokes a pipe and stoically withstands all the pain without crying out.

== Sources ==
- Behn, A., C. Gallagher, & S. Stern (2000). Oroonoko, or, The royal slave. Bedford Cultural Editions. Boston: Bedford/St. Martin's.
- Williams, Brackette (1990), "Dutchman Ghosts and the History Mystery: Ritual, Colonizer, and Colonized Interpretations of the 1763 Berbice Slave Rebellion", Journal of Historical Sociology, 3 (2): 133–165, doi:10.1111/j.1467-6443.1990.tb00094.x.
- Egerton, Douglas R. He Shall Go Out Free: The Lives of Denmark Vesey, 2nd edn. Lanham: Rowman and Littlefield, 2004.
- Bryant, Joshua (1824). Account of an insurrection of the negro slaves in the colony of Demerara, which broke out on the 18th of August, 1823. Georgetown, Demerara: A. Stevenson at the Guiana Chronicle Office. "Account of an insurrection of the negro slaves in the colony of Demerara, which broke out on the 18th of August, 1823."
- Hutner, Heidi (1993), Rereading Aphra Behn: History, Theory, and Criticism, University of Virginia Press. ISBN 0-8139-1443-4
- Hughes, Ben (2021), When I Die I Shall Return to MY Own Land: The New York Slave Revolt of 1712, Westholme Publishing. ISBN 1594163561
- Thornton, John K. (2000). War, the State, and Religious Norms in "Coromantee" Thought: The Ideology of an African American Nation-- Possible pasts: becoming colonial in early America. Cornell University Press. ISBN 0-8014-8392-1.
- Viotti da Costa, Emília (18 May 1994). Crowns of Glory, Tears of Blood: the Demerara Slave Rebellion of 1823. Oxford University Press. ISBN 0-19-510656-3.
