= Comfa =

Guyanese folk religion

- Classification: Folk
- Region: Guyana
- Places of worship: church
- Other names: Komfa, Spiritualism, Faithism, Jordanites

Comfa, or Komfa, is a folk religion in Guyana also known as Spiritualism or Faithism. The word "Comfa" is used by non-practitioners as a generic term for spirit possession in Guyana. However, the word "Comfa" is also a term to define the greater folk religion involving spirit possession originating in Guyana.

== Definition ==
Comfa is also referred to as Spiritualism or Faithism. The scholar Kean Gibson described Comfa as a folk religion. It draws influence from the other religions active in Guyana, which include Christianity, Hinduism, and Islam. Its practitioners speak Guyanese Creole, sometimes in addition to English.

== History ==
Comfa originates from the many religious traditions of the many peoples, who settled in Guyana. Of these beliefs the main influences are from African traditional practices, specifically Kongo religion, Christianity, and some elements from indigenous peoples. The main Kongo influences on Comfa are the cosmology believed and the idea that the world can be altered through the creation and use of charms.

Various African elements remain evident in Comfa, including the belief in multiple souls, divination, the ritual use of water, music, dance, and spirit possession.

Comfa can be traced back to early worship of the water spirit "Watermamma" (known as Mami Wata elsewhere) amongst enslaved Guyanese. After emancipation Christian missionaries began to try populate Guyana and their teachings began to influence early Comfa beliefs. By the 1880s, a man named Joseph MacLaren from Grenada along with Nathaniel Jordan founded a church in Guyana and formally began teaching Comfa practices under the title of "Faithism," popularly called the Jordanites.

After Guyana obtained independence from the British Empire in 1966, Comfa underwent a decline. This decline was then reversed amid the economic downturn of the 1980s and 1990s, during which growing numbers of Guyanese turned to the religion for assistance.

== Beliefs ==
=== Theology ===
Comfa teaches the existence of a single God, who created the world. It maintains that humans can address this God through prayer.

Orisha worship and Ifa practices coming from Yoruba religion are also present in the practices and worldview of Comfa.

=== Cosmology ===
Comfa outlines a cosmos encompassing a realm it calls Heights. At the centre of this cosmos are living humans. Beneath the world of humans is the terrestrial realm of discarnate souls, who can advise living people on everyday problems. Terrestrials are usually thought to live in the sea and in river creeks, although it is also believed that there are earthbound spirits that remain close to Mother Earth.

In Comfa, the terrestrial spirits are divided into three forms: the entrees, the deities, and the friends and family spirits. The entrees represent the ancestral spirits of the seven main ethnic groups in Guyana: those of Africans, Chinese, Dutch, Indians, English, Spanish, and Native Americans (often referred to in Guyana as "Bucks".) The deities are usually identified as divinities from the Hindu pantheon, such as Durga and Lakshmi.

Graveyard spirits are deemed to reside in the bowels of Mother Earth. Wandering spirits, called jombies, are believed to have been invoked from the grave but not returned.

== Practice ==
=== Worship ===
A practitioner may host a Comfa ritual in their living room. A table may be set out in the centre of the room. Onto this may be placed glasses of water, with water representing life. Coloured candles may also appear on the table, each colour denoting a different type of spirit in the Comfa theology. Flowers, foodstuffs, and alcoholic beverages may similarly be located here as offerings to these spirits. Different types of food are deemed appropriate for different types of spirit; cheese sandwiches and fried chicken for English spirits, roast pork and chow mein for Chinese spirits, or parsad and roti for Indian spirits, for example. Similarly, specific alcoholic drinks are thought preferable for certain spirits; red rum for Indians, Heineken beer for the Dutch, or vodka for Chinese. When meat, salt-foods, and alcohol are provided as offerings, it is believed that the saints stay away.

Offerings may also be given to Mother Earth, in which case they may be placed underneath the table, closer to the earth itself.

A common ritual is termed the Celestial Service or Thanks, the latter a contraction of "thanksgiving". This will begin with prayers to God and the singing of Christian hymns; these hymns signal that God and the celestials are being addressed. Part of the intention here is to ensure that the ritual is "grounded", so that spirits who subsequently arrive will do the host's bidding. During this service, the host can make requests and state which terrestrial spirit they would like to undertake this service for them. Perfume may be sprinkled to encourage the spirits to manifest; the host may also walk backward so as to invite them. Later in the ceremony, secular songs may be sung so as to entertain terrestrials in an earthly manner.

A Celestial Service may be followed by another ceremony, termed an All Nation Work or a banquet, at which the seven terrestrial spirits are entertained. A ritual might alternatively be devoted to only one spirit, but usually provision will be made for the appearance of other spirits so as to avoid bringing on bad luck.

=== Music and dance ===
Song and dance form important parts of Comfa rituals. The religion teaches that music, especially drumming, helps the spirits to manifest at the ceremonies. The Comfa drum is a cylindrical structure, around two feet tall. It is usually used for invoking African, Dutch, or Indian spirits; when inviting Chinese, English, or Spanish spirits then Comfa practitioners will often favour Western-style instruments. The number of drums used in a ritual can range from one to seven, depending on the resources of the practitioner hosting the ceremony. Certain songs may be associated with the spirits of certain ethnicities that are being invoked; a common song to welcome the Chinese spirit is the Japanese song "Sukiyaki", for instance, while the English spirit may be welcomed with "My Bonnie Lies Over the Ocean", "Let Me Call You Sweetheart", or "The Tennessee Waltz".

Having been called to the ritual, Comfa maintains, spirits may manifest by possessing participants. Those manifesting a spirit may then dance. Certain dances are associated with particular spirits; the waltz with English spirits, flamenco with Spanish spirits, and a dance involving hopping on one leg for Chinese spirits, for instance. The style of dance adopted may indicate the identity of the spirit manifesting through them. The host may use a broom to sweep away any spirits whose presence they do not desire. It is often thought that those emitting negative energy, either because of their hostility or scepticism, may undermine the success of the ceremony.

Children are typically permitted to attend Comfa ceremonies, so that they may learn the religion's practice.

== Demographics ==
At the start of the 21st century, Gibson suggested that Comfa had around 33,000 practitioners, and was followed by about 10% of the African-Guyanese population.

== See also ==
- Kumina
- Myal
