= Convince =

Afro-Jamaican religion

- Classification: Afro-Jamaican
- Theology: Myal
- Origin: Post-Abolition era Jamaica
- Separated from: Native Baptism

Convince, also known as Bongo or Flenke, is a religion from eastern Jamaica. It has roots in Kumina and Jamaican Maroon religion.

== History ==
According to research by J. W. Pullis the religion originated in the Portland Parish in Jamaica in the mid or late 1800s. It is believed to have a Central African origin in its beliefs and practices. Very little is known about the exact origins of the religion because of little research done on it. It can be deduced that the name of the religion comes from Christian teachings about "conviction" and the term "convince" began being used as a term for Myal spirit possession in the Native Baptist Church. Around 1861 many church members split into different camps with the more African oriented splitting off to form the Convince practice.

== Beliefs and practices ==
Convince belief rests on the idea that humans and spirits are part of one universe where they interact and influence each other's behavior. Many spirits are deceased members of the cult. No spirit is totally good or totally evil. The spirit's will becomes friendly if it is worshiped, unfriendly if it is neglected, and evil if it is summoned to do evil.

Religious practices are decentralized and have no authoritative hierarchy. The only structure of the religion is the collection of "bongo men" that form ceremonies when all agree to converge. Bongo men act as mediums who commune with ancestral spirits. It is a non-textual religion that highlights ritual possession, ritual dancing and healing services. Its ceremonies usually involve the guidance of bongo-men to become possessed by the spirits of the dead. Unlike Kumina its practices are more centered on individual benefit rather than community benefit and some Christian hymns are incorporated.

== See also ==
- Kumina
