= Jamaican Maroon Creole =

English-based creole of Jamaica

Deep patwa
- Region: Jamaica (Moore Town, Charles Town, Scott's Hall)
- Native speakers: None
- Language family: English Creole: Atlantic; Suriname; Deep patwa

Language codes
- ISO 639-3: None (mis)
- Glottolog: None

Jamaican Maroon language, Maroon Spirit language, Kromanti, Jamaican Maroon Creole or deep patwa is a ritual language and former mother tongue of Jamaican Maroons. It is an English-based creole with a strong Akan component. It is distinct from usual Jamaican Creole, being similar to the creoles of Sierra Leone (Krio) and Surinamese Creoles such as Sranan and Ndyuka. Today, the Maroon Spirit language is used by Jamaican Maroons and Surinamese Maroons (largely Coromantees). Another distinct ritual language (also called Kromanti) consisting mostly of words and phrases from Akan languages, is also used by Jamaican Maroons in Myal rituals including some involving possession by ancestral spirits during Kromanti ceremonies or when addressing those who are possessed and sometimes used as a kind of code. Kromanti is also a branch of the Myal religion in Jamaican Maroon communities.

The term "Kromanti" is used by Maroon participants in such Myal ceremonies to refer to their language spoken by ancestors in the distant past, prior to the creolization of Jamaican Maroon Creole. This term is used to refer to a language which is "clearly not a form of Jamaican Creole and displays very little English content" (Bilby 1983: 38). While Kromanti is not a functioning language, those possessed by ancestral spirits are attributed the ability to speak it. More remote ancestors are compared with more recent ancestors on a gradient, such that increasing strength and ability in the use of the non-creolized Kromanti are attributed to increasingly remote ancestors (as opposed to the Jamaican Maroon Creole used to address these ancestors).

The language was brought along by the maroon population from Cudjoe's Town (Trelawny Town) to Nova Scotia in 1796, where they were sent in exile. They eventually traveled to Sierra Leone in 1800. Their creole language highly influenced the local creole language that evolved into present day Krio.

== Some phonological characteristics of Jamaican Maroon Creole ==
Bilby discusses several phonological distinctions between Jamaican Creole and Jamaican Maroon Creole.

Vowel epithesis: Some words in the Maroon Creole have a vowel in the final syllable, compared to Jamaican Creole. Some examples are:

- fete "to fight"
- wudu "forest"
- mutu "mouth"

Liquids: Many words that have a lateral liquid /l/ in Jamaican Creole have a trill /r/ in Maroon Creole. Some examples are:

- priis "pleased"
- braka "black"
- bere "belly"

/ai/ to /e/: There are several instances where the "deep creole" uses /e/ while the "normal creole" uses /ai/.

"Deep"		"Normal"
krem	"to climb"	klaim
wete	"white"	wait
net	"night"	nait

== See also ==
- Jamaican Maroon religion
- Spirit possession
- Sierra Leonean Krio
- West African Pidgin English
