= Montamentu =

African Caribbean religion

Montamentu is an African Caribbean ecstatic religion found in Curaçao. Precursors or earlier forms may be seen in ancestor veneration in the 18th century and a 1788 court case in which religionists were condemned by the colonial court for practicing the religion as an act of "lying to the bystanders". In the 1950s a new wave came about, introduced by migrants from the Dominican Republic. As with most African diaspora religions from the colonial and slavery era, Montamentu is a syncretic religion. Roman Catholic, African and Native American, as well as some Asian deities are revered.

Montamentu is accompanied by music. In some cases by tambú drumming, although this is a misnomer. Tambú, proper, is the drum, rhythms, music event, dancing and singing combined in a festive, non-religious setting. Also: in some ceremonies the music is provided by musical records from Cuba, the Dominican Republic, Haiti or Venezuela. Sometimes there is chanting without drums.
