= Dugu ceremony =

The Dugu is an ancient extended funerary ceremony (in Guatemala, Belize, Honduras, Nicaragua it is also known as the 9 nights ceremony) practiced by the Garifuna people. The Garifuna is a small-to-medium-sized Central American ethnic group that has inhabited many Central American countries such as Guatemala, Belize and Honduras since the 17th century. Their roots come from both the Caribbean and African coasts. The story goes that enslaved people being brought over to the Americas crashed into St. Vincent. The Indigenous Caribbean Indians and Africans soon formed a community and ethnic group called the Garifuna. They were identified as the "Black Caribs" to differentiate them from the native Caribbean population.

The Dugu is a type of funeral ceremony that brings the community and families together. It is a festival that aims to bring deceased ancestors of the Garifuna to the present and lasts between two days to as much as two weeks. The ceremony seeks to cure ill persons that have become sick because they have displeased the gubida (spirits). Families and friends gather around drums and sing, calling the gubida to the ceremony. This ceremony is headed by the Buyai (shaman). The Buyai is responsible for organizing and ordering all parts of the ceremony including food, clothes worn, sacrifices, and its length. Once the Buyai believes the spirits of the ancestors are present, the sick person is given food and rum. The rest of the food and alcohol is sacrificed and the person is predicted to be cured.

The Dugu ritual has recently become more common. In the 1850s and 1860s the Dugu was little practiced due to fear the government (appointed by the British) would ban the ritual altogether. Now, however, the Dugu ji is practiced in many countries throughout Central America, but mainly in Livingston, Guatemala. There are many reasons for the increase, one of which is to help unify the Garifuna people and also become politically visible as an ethnic group.
