= Jamaican Maroons =

Community founded by escaped slaves

Regions with significant populations
- Jamaica; Sierra Leone

Languages
- Jamaican Patois, Kromanti

Religion
- Jamaican Maroon religion, Christianity

Related ethnic groups
- Coromantee, Jamaicans of African descent, Sierra Leone Creoles, Maroon people

Jamaican Maroons are a group descended from Africans who freed themselves from slavery in the Colony of Jamaica and established communities of free black people in the island's mountainous interior, primarily in the eastern parishes. Africans who were enslaved during Spanish rule over Jamaica (1493–1655) may have been the first to develop such refugee communities.

The English, who invaded the island in 1655, continued the importation of enslaved Africans to work on the island's sugar-cane plantations. Africans in Jamaica continually resisted enslavement, with many who freed themselves becoming maroons. The revolts disrupted the sugar economy in Jamaica and made it less profitable. The uprisings decreased after the British colonial authorities signed treaties with the Leeward Maroons in 1738 and the Windward Maroons in 1739. The importance of the Maroons to the colonial authorities declined after slavery was abolished in 1838.

The Windward Maroons and those from the Cockpit Country resisted conquest in the First Maroon War (c. 1728 to 1740), which the colonial government ended in 1739–1740 by making treaties, to grant lands and to respect maroon autonomy, in exchange for peace and aiding the colonial militia if needed against external enemies. The tension between Governor Alexander Lindsay and the majority of the Leeward Maroons resulted in the Second Maroon War from 1795 to 1796. Although the governor promised leniency if the maroons surrendered, he later betrayed them and, supported by the Assembly, insisted on deporting just under 600 Maroons to British settlements in Nova Scotia, where enslaved African Americans who escaped from the United States were also resettled. The deported Maroons were unhappy with conditions in Nova Scotia, and in 1800 about 600 left, having obtained passage to Freetown eight years after the Sierra Leone Company established it in West Africa (in present-day Sierra Leone) as a British colony.

== Origins ==
The word "maroon" is derived via French from the Spanish word cimarrón, meaning "wild" or "untamed". This word usually referred to runaways, castaways, or the shipwrecked; those marooned probably would never return. The etymology of the Spanish word cimarrón is unknown.

The term "Jamaican Maroons" refers to Africans who were stranded in Jamaica.

When the English invaded Jamaica in 1655, most Spanish colonists fled. Many of their slaves escaped and, together with free Black people and mulattoes, former slaves, and possibly Indigenous people as well, coalesced into a number of ethnically diverse groups in the Jamaican interior.

== History ==
=== Spanish Maroons ===
Some Spanish Maroons created palenques, or stockaded mountain farms, first at Lluidas Vale, in modern-day Saint Catherine Parish, under Juan de Bolas (also known as Lubolo). Toward the western end of Cockpit Country were the "Varmahaly or Karmahaly Negroes" under the leadership of Juan de Serras. There was possibly a third group that was active in the region of Porus, in modern Manchester Parish; and a fourth in the Blue Mountains. During the first decade of English rule, these groups were active on behalf of the Spanish. But, as it became increasingly obvious that the British would hold their conquest, the group run by de Bolas changed its position.

Faced with discovery and defeat in 1659, de Bolas allied with the English and guided their troops on a raid which resulted in the final expulsion of the Spanish in 1660. In exchange, in 1663, Governor Sir Charles Lyttelton, 3rd Baronet, signed the first maroon treaty, granting de Bolas and his people land on the same terms as English settlers. The colonial authorities paid the men of de Bolas to hunt the supporters of de Serras and recent runaways. However, de Bolas was eventually killed in an ambush, probably by Maroons belonging to de Serras. While the Maroons belonging to de Bolas disappeared from history, the English authorities failed to subdue the Karmahaly Maroons.

The other Maroon groups remained independent in the mountainous interior of Jamaica, surviving by subsistence farming and periodic raids of plantations. These initial Maroon groups faded from colonial history records, possibly migrating to more mountainous or remote regions of the interior. Others may have coalesced to form the nucleus of what would later be called the Windward Maroons. Over time, runaway slaves increased the Maroon population, which eventually came to control large areas of the Jamaican mountainous interior.

In the 1670s and 1680s, in his capacity as an owner of a large slave plantation, former buccaneer and now lieutenant-governor of Jamaica Sir Henry Morgan led three campaigns against the Karmahaly Maroons of de Serras. Morgan achieved some success against the Maroons, who withdrew further into the Blue Mountains, where they were able to stay out of the reach of Morgan and his forces. It is possible the Maroons of de Serras merged with the Windward Maroons.

==== Establishment of the Leeward and Windward Maroons ====
Between 1673 and 1690 there were several major slave uprisings, mainly prompted by newly arrived, highly militaristic Akan groups called Coromantee that were captives in Cape Coast, Ghana. On 31 July 1690, a rebellion involving 500 slaves from the Sutton estate in Clarendon Parish led to the formation of Jamaica's most stable and best organized Maroon group. Although some were killed, recaptured, or surrendered, more than 200, including women and children, remained free after the rebellion ended.

They established an Akan-style polity based in the western parts of the Cockpit Country, notably Cudjoe's Town (Trelawny Town); the most famous ruler of the Western Maroons was Cudjoe. They incorporated outsiders only after newcomers had satisfied a strict probationary period.

At this time, the leaders who emerged in the Eastern Maroons were Quao and Queen Nanny. The Windward Maroons, in the wilder parts of eastern Jamaica, were always composed of separate highly mobile and culturally heterogeneous groups. It is possible that the runaway slaves from de Serras' group of Karmahaly Maroons formed the initial nucleus of the Windward Maroons. From early on, the Jamaican governors considered their settlements an impediment to English development of the interior. They ordered raids on the Maroon settlements in 1686 and 1702, to little effect.

By about 1720, a stronger Windward community had developed around the culturally Africanised group of three villages known as Nanny Town, under the spiritual leadership of Queen Nanny, an Ashanti woman, sometimes in allegiance and sometimes in competition with other Windward groups. She was known for her exceptional leadership skills, especially in guerrilla warfare during the First Maroon War. One tactic particular to the Jamaican Maroons involved the art of camouflage using plants. Queen Nanny's remains are reputedly buried at "Bump Grave" in Moore Town, the main town of the Windward Maroons, who are concentrated in and around the Rio Grande valley in the north-eastern parish of Portland. Also known as Granny Nanny (died c. 1750s), she is the only woman honoured as one of Jamaica's National Heroes. She has been immortalised in songs and legends.

=== Maroons in the 18th century ===
==== First Maroon War 1728–1739 ====
Disturbed by plantation raiding, the colonial authorities of Jamaica wanted to eradicate the Maroon communities in order to promote British settlement. Their strategy, beginning in the 1730s, was to break off lines of communication between the Windward and Leeward Maroons, then first pick off the less organized Windward Maroons. In practice, the Maroon troops' command of the territory and skill in guerrilla warfare gave them a strong advantage over colonial forces.

After much fighting, the British took and destroyed Nanny Town in 1734, but most of the Windward Maroons simply dispersed and formed new settlements. At this point, however, fighting shifted to Leeward, where the British troops had equally limited success against the well-trained and organized forces of Cudjoe.

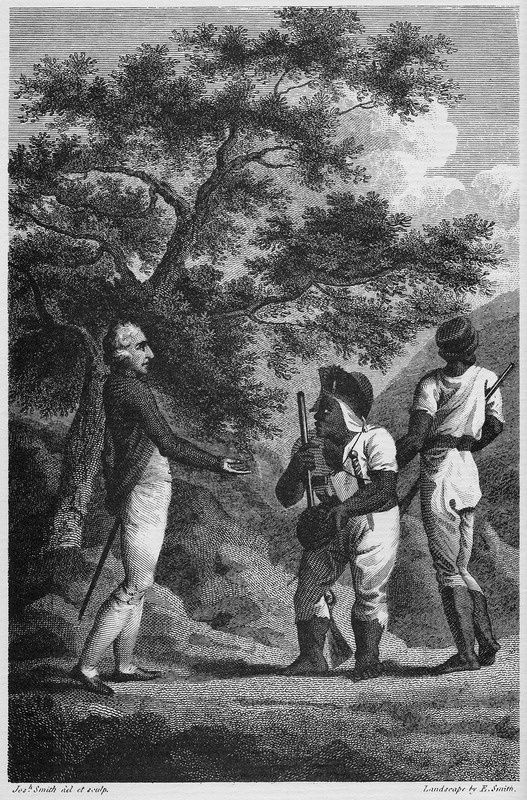
The maroon leader Cudjoe making peace with the planter John Guthrie

By the mid-1730s, warfare was proving costly to Maroons and British alike and was turning into an ongoing stalemate. Cudjoe rejected suggestions of a treaty in 1734 and 1736, but by 1738 he agreed to parley with John Guthrie. This local planter and militia officer was known to and respected by the Maroons. In 1739, the treaty signed under British governor Edward Trelawny granted Cudjoe's Maroons 1500 acres of land between their strongholds of Trelawny Town and Accompong in the Cockpit Country and a certain amount of political autonomy and economic freedoms, in return for which the Maroons were to provide military support in case of invasion or rebellion, and to return runaway slaves in exchange for a bounty of two dollars each. This last clause in the treaty caused tension between the Maroons and the enslaved black population, although from time to time runaways from the plantations still found their way into Maroon settlements.

In addition, a British superintendent was to be assigned to live in each Maroon town. In 1740, similar treaties were signed by Quao and Nanny, major leaders of the Windward Maroons. The Windward Maroons were originally located at Crawford's Town and the new Nanny Town (now called Moore Town). In all, about 600 Maroons came to terms with the British authorities through these two treaties.

Not all the Maroons accepted the treaties. Rebellions occurred in Maroon communities in the years that followed. After the treaties, the white superintendents appointed by the governors eventually took control of the Maroon towns. In the 1740s, some Leeward Maroons who opposed the 1739 treaty rose in revolt, but Cudjoe crushed those rebellions.

In 1754, Quao attempted to overthrow Edward Crawford, the new Maroon leader of the Windward Maroon town, and in the resulting conflict, Crawford's Town was destroyed. Governor Charles Knowles re-established control over the uprising with the help of other Maroons. He then ordered that the Maroons of Crawford's Town be resettled in the new, nearby Windward Maroon towns of Charles Town and Scott's Hall.

The Maroon population grew from 664 in 1739 to 1,288 in 1796, at a time when both the slave population and the white settler communities were ravaged by disease.

==== Intervention in Tacky's War, 1760 ====
In April 1760, the Jamaican government called upon the Maroons to honour their treaties and come to their assistance during the major slave uprising led by the Fante leader, Tacky, in Saint Mary Parish, Jamaica. The Windward Maroons were first to be mobilized. Their intervention at first appeared half-hearted: the Scott's Hall Maroons began by claiming outstanding arrears in bounty, while those Charles Town Maroons at Down's Cove allegedly took cover when attacked by the rebels. However, the Maroon warriors were employing guerrilla warfare tactics, which contradicted the British military tradition of marching into the oncoming fire.

In the end, it was a Scott's Hall Maroon, Lieutenant Davy the Maroon, who killed Tacky during a skirmish. The loss of Tacky's leadership essentially ended the initial rebellion.

In western Jamaica, Apongo led another slave rebellion, inspired by Tacky's Revolt, which lasted from April 1760 to October 1761. Cudjoe's well-trained forces were mobilized to help deal with them with some degree of success.

==== The Maroons and runaway communities in the Blue Mountains ====
In the years that followed Tacky's rebellion, many Maroon officers such as Samuel Grant, allegedly the son of Davy, made a career out of hunting runaway slaves for the colonial authorities. These runaway slaves formed informal maroon communities, modelled along the lines of the official Maroon communities before they came to terms.

In the 18th century, Maroons also hunted and killed notorious escaped slaves and their deputies, such as Ancoma, Three Fingered Jack, and Dagger. However, while they were successful in capturing and killing some runaways and their leaders, most members of the runaway maroon communities continued to thrive under new leaders.

White superintendents took command of the Maroon towns, and the Maroon officers were relegated to their subordinates. After Tacky's War, the governor appointed a separate superintendent for each of the five Maroon towns. These superintendents reported to the Superintendent-General, who in turn reported to the governor. The Superintendents-General of all Maroon towns were as follows:

- 1770–c. 1772 William Ross
- 1772–c. 1779 Robert Brereton
- c. 1779 John Fergusson
- 1779–1792/3 John James

==== Second Maroon War 1795–1796 ====
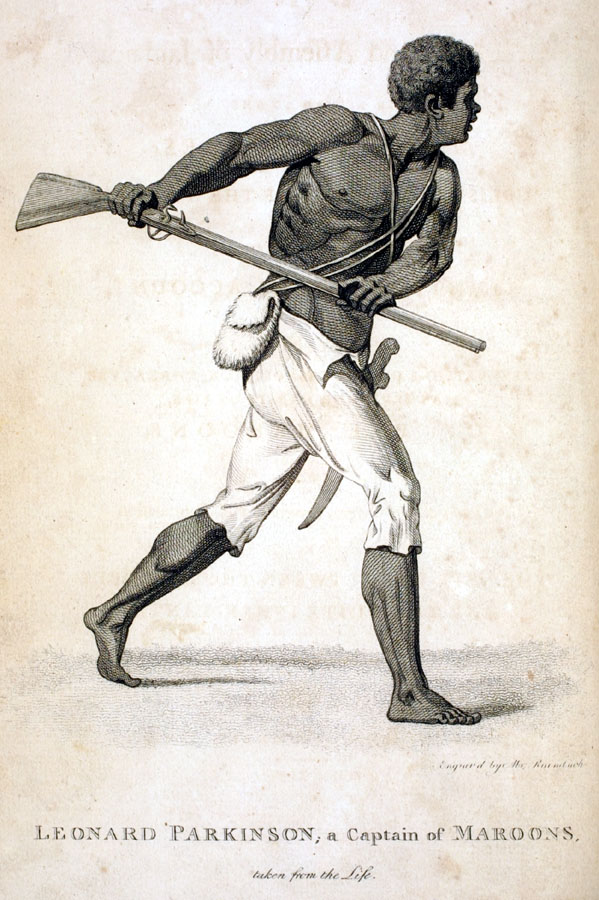
"Leonard Parkinson, A Captain of the Maroons; taken from the Life" 1796 by Abraham Raimbach

The Second Maroon War began in 1795 against the background of the British-Jamaican planters panicked by the excesses of the French Revolution, and by the corresponding start of a slave revolt in neighboring Saint-Domingue, which ended with the independence of Haiti in 1804. At the same time, an increasing hunger for land among expanding Maroon communities in Jamaica coincided with several more immediate and proximate causes of grievance among the Maroons of Cudjoe's Town (Trelawny Town).

The treaties following the First Maroon War had called for the assignment of a white "superintendent" in each Maroon community. Trelawny Town had objected to the official recently assigned to them and eventually expelled him. At this, the new, hardline Governor, Balcarres, sent William Fitch to march on Trelawny Town with a military force to demand their immediate submission. Balcarres ignored the advice of local planters, who suggested giving the Maroons some more land in order to avoid conflict. Instead, the governor demanded that the Maroons surrender unconditionally, provoking a conflict that could have been avoided. The Trelawny Maroons, led by their colonel, Montague James, chose to fight and were initially successful, fighting a guerrilla war in small bands under several captains, of whom the most noted were Johnson, Parkinson, and Palmer.

The casualties suffered by Fitch and his men were significantly higher than those felt by the Maroons of Trelawny Town. When the Trelawny Town Maroons killed Fitch, several of his officers, some Accompong Maroon trackers, and many militia soldiers in an ambush, Balcarres appointed a new general, George Walpole. This new general suffered more setbacks, until he eventually opted to besiege the Cockpit Country on a massive scale, surrounding it with watchposts, firing in shells from a long distance, and intending to destroy or cut off all Maroon provision grounds. Meanwhile, Maroon attempts to recruit plantation slaves met with a mixed response, though large numbers of runaway slaves gained their freedom by fighting for Trelawny Town. Other Maroon communities maintained neutrality, but Accompong Town, however, fought on the side of the colonial militias against Trelawny Town.

Despite signs that the siege was working, Balcarres grew impatient and sent to Cuba for a hundred hunting dogs and handlers. The reputation of these was so fearsome that their arrival quickly prompted the surrender of the majority of Trelawny forces. The Maroons, however, only put down their arms on condition that they would not be deported, and Walpole gave his word that would be the case. To Walpole's dismay, Balcarres refused to treat with the defeated Maroons and had them deported from Jamaica, at first to Nova Scotia, then to the new British colony of Sierra Leone, and joined the African-American founders who established the Colony of Sierra Leone and the settlement of Freetown, Sierra Leone.

From the 1830s on, some Maroons (or their descendants) returned to Jamaica to work as free labourers, and many of them settled in the village of Flagstaff, near the old site of Trelawny Town (although some of these returnees resettled in Sierra Leone) (see Jamaican Maroons in Sierra Leone). The descendants of the Returned Maroons live in Flagstaff today (see Cudjoe's Town (Trelawny Town)). Those who remained in Sierra Leone formed the new Creole ethnic group of Sierra Leone which established diaspora communities along the West African shores from Sierra Leone to the Gambia to Fernando Pó.

=== Maroons in the 19th century ===
==== Maroons in the last years of slavery ====
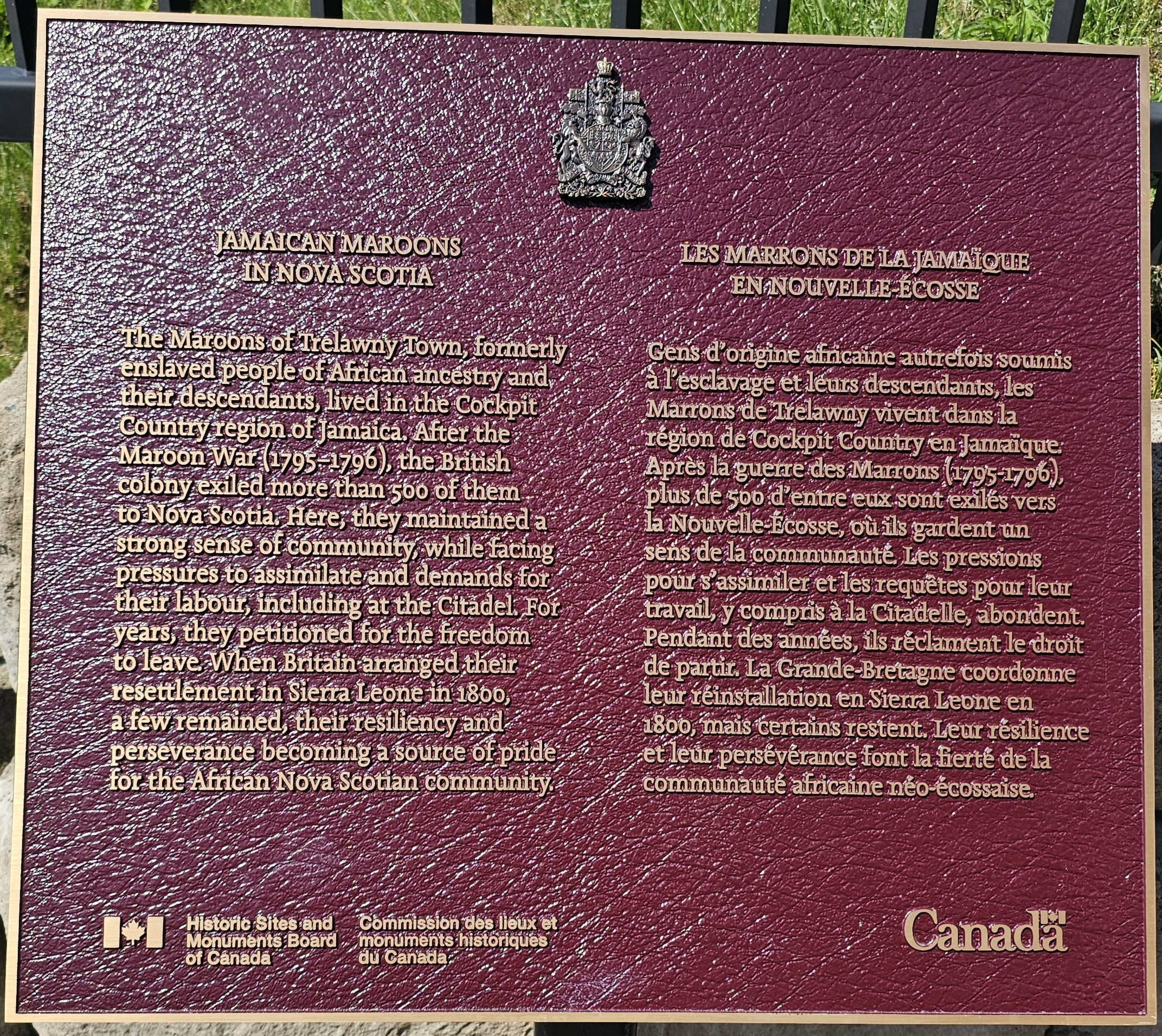
A plaque discussing Jamaican Maroons in Nova Scotia, located at the Halifax Citadel

Trelawny Town was the largest Maroon town, so the population of Maroons in Jamaica was significantly dented by their deportation. However, in the nineteenth century the total population of the four remaining Maroon towns grew from 853 in 1808 to 1,563 in 1841. The Maroon towns grew in numbers at a time when the population of black slaves and white slave-holders alike declined from disease. One historian argues that this is due to the healthier environment of the Maroon towns.

When the colonial authorities deported the Maroons of Trelawny Town, they left a void which was filled by communities of runaway slaves. The Maroons of the smaller town of Accompong were unable to cope with the growing numbers of runaways in western Jamaica, who found refuge elsewhere in the Cockpit Country. The Accompong Maroons tried but failed in their attempts to disperse the runaway community established by Cuffee in the Cockpit Country in 1798. When Cuffee's maroon group faded from the colonial records, their place was taken by another group of runaways, who established themselves in the Cockpit Country in 1812. The maroon community of Me-no-Sen-You-no-Come also resisted attempts by the Accompong Maroons and the colonial militias to disperse them in the 1820s.

A large maroon group of runaway slaves established themselves near Hellshire Beach in southern Jamaica, and it thrived there for years until it was finally dispersed by a party of Windward Maroons in 1819.

The Maroons played a significant role in helping the colonial authorities to suppress the Samuel Sharpe revolt in 1831–32, under the leadership of white superintendents such as Alexander Fyfe (Fyffe).

Sharpe's Baptist War persuaded the British government to end the system of slavery, which they did in the years following the rebellion. After that, the colonial authorities had no use for the Maroons, and they passed the Maroon Allotments Act in 1842, and abolished the post of superintendent in the 1850s. Their attempts to break up the Maroon communal land, while partially successful in Charles Town and Scott's Hall, met with Maroon resistance in Accompong Town and Moore Town.

==== The Returned Maroons of Flagstaff ====
After the Second Maroon War, the colonial authorities converted Trelawny Town into a military barracks, and renamed it Maroon Town, Jamaica. The Trelawny Maroons flourished in Sierra Leone at first, but their situation soon soured, and they submitted petitions to the British government, asking for permission to return to Jamaica. These petitions were turned down.

However, in 1831, another petition was presented by 224 Sierra Leone Maroons to the British government, and this time the Jamaican authorities relented. They responded by saying they would place no obstacle in the way of Maroons returning to Jamaica, but would not pay any passage or for the purchase of lands in the island.

In 1839, the first Maroons made their way from Sierra Leone to Jamaica. Mary Brown and her family, which included her daughter Sarah McGale and a Spanish son-in-law, sold off their property in Sierra Leone, bought a schooner, and set sail for Jamaica. They were joined by two other Sierra Leone Maroons, Mary Ricketts and her daughter Jane Bryan. In 1841, this group found their way to Trelawny Town, now called Maroon Town, but which they still insisted on calling Cudjoe's Town. Their descendants still live there today in a village named Flagstaff among a group known as the Returned Maroons.

In 1841, the first ship to arrive in Sierra Leone looking for African workers was the Hector, and several Maroons were so desperate to leave Sierra Leone that they did not wait for the ship to dock, but rowed out to meet it in their canoes. In all, 64 Maroons left Sierra Leone for Jamaica on the Hector alone. Most Sierra Leone Maroons lived in Freetown, and between 1837 and 1844, Freetown's Maroon population shrank from 650 to 454, suggesting that about 200 made their way back to Jamaica.

As many as one-third of the Maroons in Sierra Leone returned to Jamaica in the 1840s.

==== Intervention in the Morant Bay Rebellion, 1865 ====
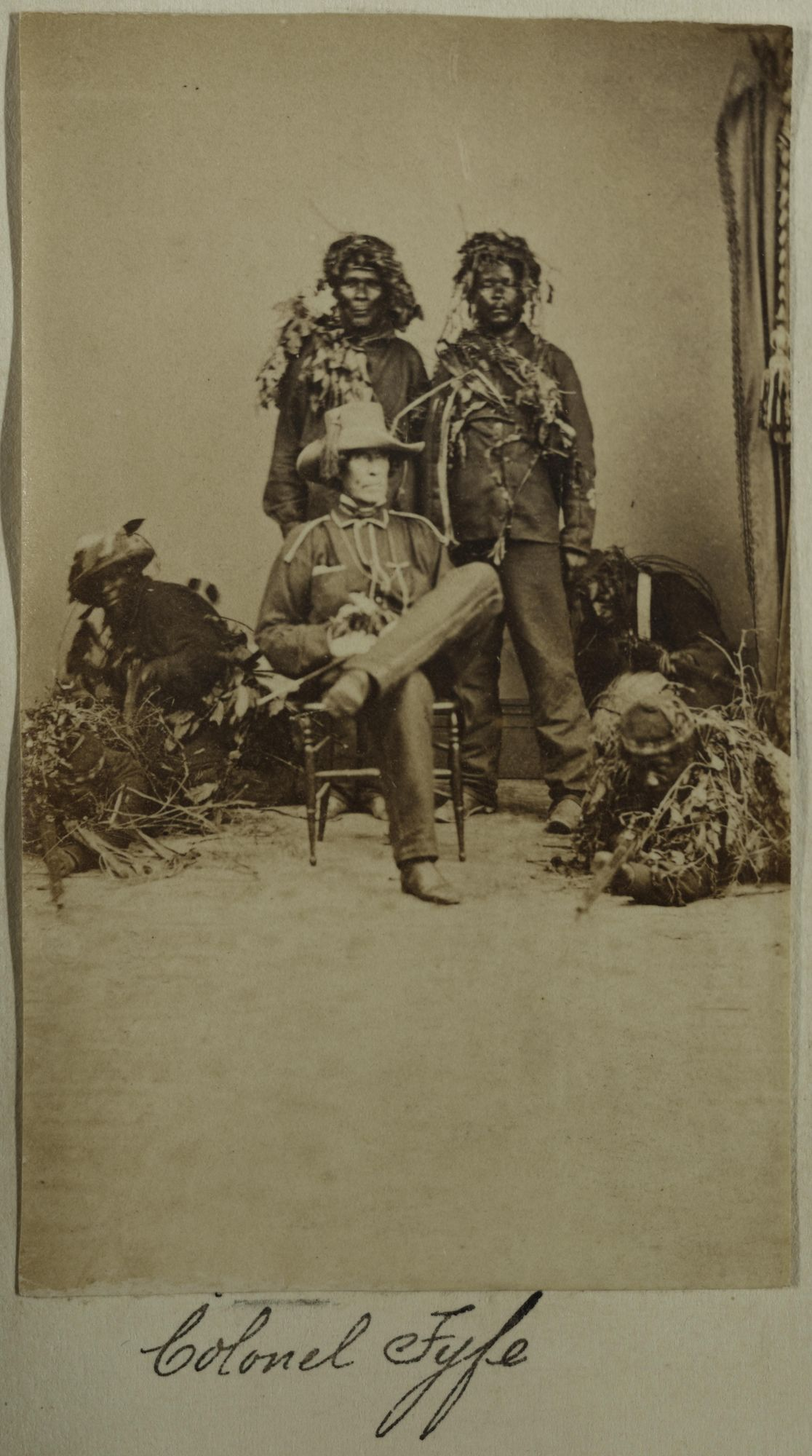
Six Maroons, with rifles and in camouflage, with Colonel Fyfe, c.1865

In 1865, poor free blacks, led by Baptist deacon Paul Bogle, rose in revolt against the colonial authorities in the Morant Bay Rebellion. The governor called out the Moore Town Maroons one last time to put down the rebellion. Fyfe was called up once more to lead a combination of Moore Town Maroons, including some who resided in Hayfield and Bath, and they committed a number of atrocities before they captured Bogle. However, their cruelty in suppressing the uprising attracted a lot of criticism from Methodist missionaries and residents of Saint Thomas Parish, Jamaica.

=== Maroons in the 21st century ===
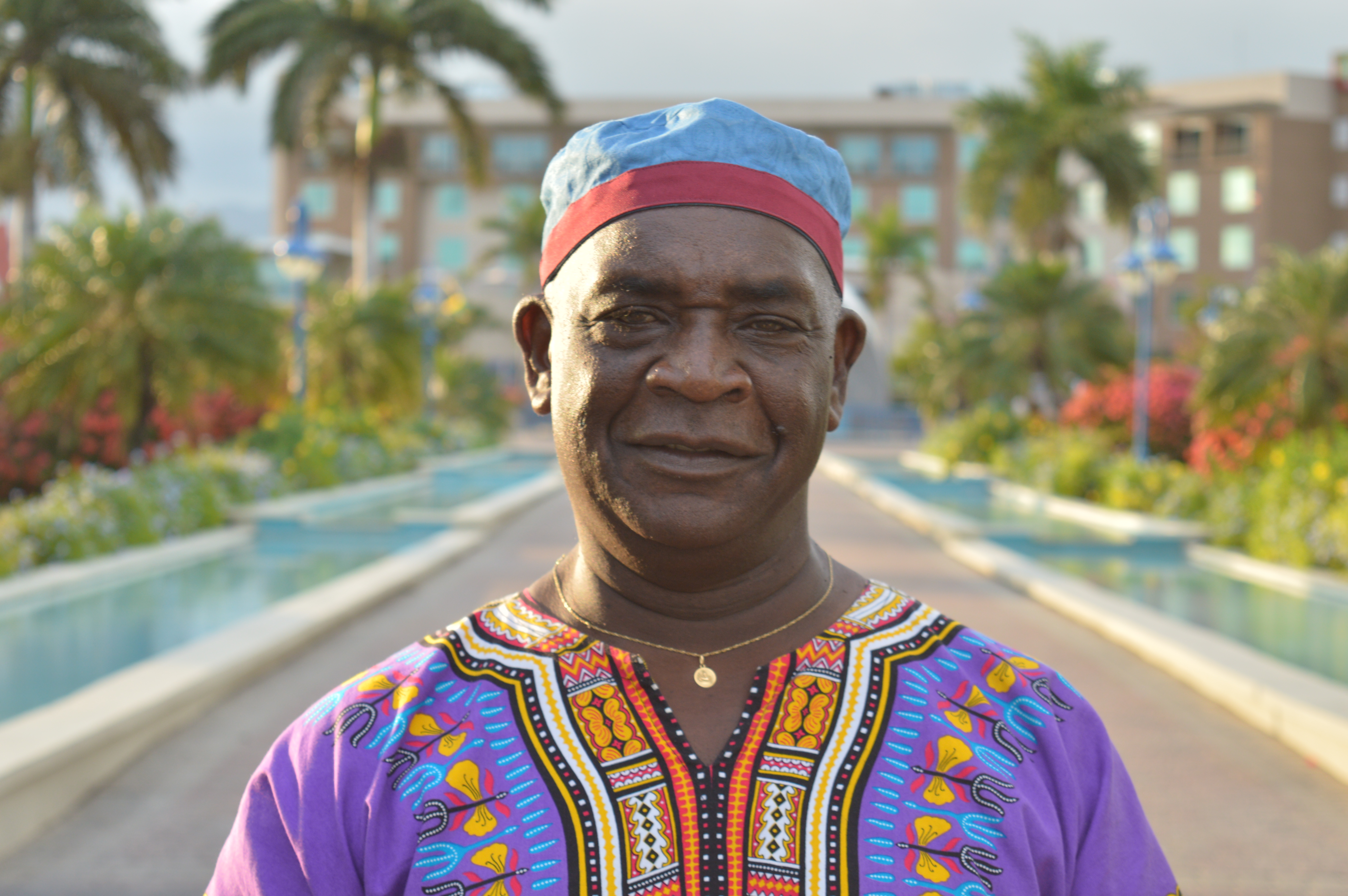
Ferron Williams, former Colonel-in-Chief and elected leader of Accompong

To this day, the Maroons in Jamaica are, to a small extent, autonomous and separate from Jamaican culture. Those of Accompong have preserved their land since 1739. The isolation used to their advantage by their ancestors has today resulted in their communities being among the most inaccessible on the island.

Today, the four official Maroon towns still in existence in Jamaica are Accompong Town, Moore Town, Charles Town and Scott's Hall. They hold lands allotted to them in the 1739–1740 treaties with the British. These Maroons still maintain their traditional celebrations and practices, some of which have West African origin. For example, the council of a Maroon settlement is called an Asofo, from the Akan word asafo ('assembly, church, society').

Native-born Jamaicans and island tourists are allowed to attend many of these events. Others considered sacred are held in secret and shrouded in mystery. Singing, dancing, drum-playing, and preparation of traditional foods form a central part of most gatherings. In their largest town, Accompong, in the parish of St. Elizabeth, the Leeward Maroons have a vibrant community of about 600. Tours of the village are offered to foreigners. They hold a large festival annually on 6 January to commemorate the signing of the peace treaty with the British after the First Maroon War.

Moore Town, located between the Blue Mountains and John Crow Mountains in Portland Parish, was relisted on the UNESCO Representative List of the Intangible Cultural Heritage of Humanity in 2008 for its Maroon heritage, particularly music.

== Jamaican Maroon treaty towns ==
=== Leeward Maroons ===
- Cudjoe's Town (Trelawny Town), ruled by Cudjoe, and secured recognition from the British after the First Maroon War (1728–1740). Most of the Trelawny Maroons were deported after the Second Maroon War to Nova Scotia, and then to Sierra Leone. Eventually, after Emancipation, in the 1840s, a few hundred Trelawny Maroons eventually returned from Sierra Leone, and established a community of Returned Maroons near the site of Trelawny Town and called it Flagstaff. The Returned Maroons of Trelawny Town still live in Flagstaff today.
- Maroon Town, Jamaica, after the deportation of the Trelawny Maroons, the British colonial government took control of Trelawny Town, and established a military barracks there. It became known as Maroon Town, though no Maroons lived there any more.
- Accompong, along with Cudjoe's Town, Accompong was the main settlement of the Leeward Maroons. Ruled by Accompong, after whom the town was named.

=== Windward Maroons ===
- Nanny Town, one of the two main towns of the Windward Maroons during the First Maroon War, led by the legendary Queen Nanny, located in the Blue Mountains of eastern Jamaica. This town exchanged hands several times during the First Maroon War, and was eventually abandoned for a new site named New Nanny Town, also located in the Blue Mountains.
- Moore Town, the new site of the inhabitants of Nanny Town, and originally named New Nanny Town.
- Crawford's Town, another of the two main towns of the Windward Maroons during the First Maroon War, led by Quao. After the First Maroon War, Quao was replaced as leader by Edward Crawford, after whom the town was later named. In the 1750s, a conflict between two factions led by these two opposing leaders eventually led to destruction of Crawford's Town.
- Charles Town, Jamaica, was established in the 1750s, after the destruction of Crawford's Town. Most of its new inhabitants were the supporters of Ned Crawford, who made up the majority of the Maroons in Crawford's Town.
- Scott's Hall, Jamaica, was a minor Maroon town that predated the destruction of Crawford's Town. In the 1750s, the supporters of Quao, who made up the minority of the Maroons in Crawford's Town, relocated to Scott's Hall.

=== In Sierra Leone ===
- Maroon Town, Sierra Leone, became a settlement of Jamaican Maroons in Sierra Leone, after the Trelawny Maroons were deported from Jamaica.

== See also ==
- Black Nova Scotians
- Black Seminoles
- Coromantee
- Dread & Alive, comic series centred on a maroon.
- Jamaican Maroon Creole
- Jamaican Maroons in Sierra Leone
- Kromanti dance (religious)
- Maroon (people)
- Maroon Town, Sierra Leone
- Sierra Leone Creole people
