= Duppy =

Jamaican word meaning ghost or spirit

Duppy is a word of African origin commonly used in various Caribbean Islands, including The Bahamas, Barbados and Jamaica, meaning ghost or spirit. The word is sometimes spelled duffy.

It is both singular and plural. Much of Caribbean folklore revolves around duppy. Duppy are generally regarded as malevolent spirits who bring misfortune and woe on those they set upon. They are said to mostly come out and haunt people at night, and people from around the islands claim to have seen them. The "Rolling Calf" (a scary creature said to have chains around its body), "Three footed horse", and "Ol' Hige" are examples of the more malicious spirits.

In many of the islands of the Lesser Antilles, duppy are known as jumbies. Barbados also uses the word duppy and it holds the same meaning as it does in Jamaica. It is also used in Multicultural London English, meaning to "kill" someone/something.

== Origins ==
The word duppy originates from the Ga language as most of the African folklore and culture in Jamaica comes from the Ashanti people (a similar Kwa speaking people also from Ghana). In the Ga language of Ghana, Adope literally means dwarf, but in Ghanaian folklore spirits are dwarves. It could also originate from the special Akan day Dapaa, which occurs 9 days after the first Monday of the Akan month Fwodwo. However, in Jamaica, they celebrate this 9-day tradition after someone dies. It is called "9 nights" during which they believe it takes 9 days(a day in Akan culture starts at dusk) for the spirit to return to the ancestral land. On Dapaa, it is believed that the ancestral spirits return to their homeland, a shared belief with Jamaica. The word Dapaa may have undergone vowel changes to become the present day Duppy, to mean ancestral spirit. In Obeah, a person is believed to possess two souls—a good soul and an earthly soul. In death, the good soul goes to heaven to be judged by God, while the earthly spirit remains for three days in the coffin with the body, where it may escape if proper precautions are not taken and appear as a duppy.

== See also ==
- Ascalapha odorata – Species of moth known in the vernacular as a "Duppy Bat".
- Dybbuk
- Madam Koi Koi
- Mami Wata
- Tikoloshe
