= Myal =

Afro-Jamaican religion

- Type: Creole
- Classification: Afro-Jamaican
- Origin: Slave era Jamaica
- Separated from: Obeah
- Separations: Convince; Kumina; Revivalism; Pocomania; Revival Zion

Myal is an indigenous religion in Jamaica and was first practiced by the native Arawakan speaking peoples who first peopled Jamaica. Due to the integration of Africans in the indigenous communities during the colonial era it developed into an Afro-Jamaican spirituality. Myal is a complete belief system that incorporates the Arawakan cosmovision, ritualistic magic, spiritual possession and dancing. Unlike Obeah, which is more commonly associated with evil magic, Myal is associated with more positive spiritual activities. Over time, a syncretic version of Myal emerged known as Revivalism, though Myal in its purer form still exists in indigenous/tribal communities and in particularly rural remote areas.

Obeah in Jamaica is viewed as the antithesis of Myal and is viewed as witchcraft in Myal cosmovision. In Myal it is viewed as a misuse of traditional religion and the spirituality. According to Myalists, obeahmen were even employed by the enslavers to use ritual magic against indigenous communities. There are records of planters employing obeahmen to use love magic to forcefully compel women on the plantation into romantic relationships with them, or to further the effects of slavery, hence the rivalry between Myal and Obeah.

== History ==
=== Origin ===
Myal is an indigenous religious institution in Jamaica with African influences. The practice of Myal as a spirit possession originated in Jamaica. The African influences of Myal include elements derived from Akan origin. There are different branches of Myal which reflect the various African contributions to the history of the evolution of Myal. The evolution of the Myal religion resulted from the interaction of indigenous communities with diverse African ethnic groups and the colonial resistance struggle.

The term Myal was first recorded by Edward Long in 1774 when describing a ritual dance he observed in Jamaica. At first, the practices of Obeah and Myal were not distinguished due to the colonial eradication and suppression of the religion. Over time, due to a period of intense religious persecution over time, "Myal-men" involved in spirit possession became involved with Jamaican Native Baptist churches and incorporated Myal rituals into them, resulting in syncretic adaptations of Myal borne out through Revivalism and other church movements. Over time, these Myal-influenced churches began preaching the importance of baptisms and other Christian doctrine syncretized with Myal traditions.

Despite colonial attempts at eradication, Myal still exists as a distinct religion in Jamaica, and was maintained by indigenous/tribal communities living in remote rural areas where it still exists as an institution, though it is not as widespread due to colonial persecution.

There are rich Akan traditions still preserved within Myal, including colour codes used by the Akan people, the ethnic group to which the Ashanti belongs to. Many Akan iconography was used and is still used by its derivative of the Zion Revival church, such as religious symbols of the Nyame Dua, a brass pan with rain water outside of a church, Tano's brass pan containing river water and rocks from the river on top a stool with his two swords with his herbs of the leaf of life plant and aloe vera. The Leaf of Life in Ghana is called "Tan me wo wuo" ('hate me and die', in English) a play on the Jamaican name Leaf of Life. The plant symbolizes Tano multifaceted nature of "doing it all", like how the plant is universally accepted. In the 1920s, Martha Beckwith documented Myal practitioners dressed like the Akan with their white cloth over their shoulders and tie heads on their heads. This is the regalia of the Akan royal and priestly elite. Dances include a spin what Jamaicans call "wheel and come again." Asante-Akans say: "Me kɔ, me ba." ('Go and come again', in English).

=== Christianization ===
After the abolition of slavery, conservative Christian churches began to lose followers to Bedwardism and Myalist Native Baptist Churches. After 1814, the Myalist chapels started to become more visible. By the 1840s, many Congolese indentured laborers arrived in Jamaica where they revitalised Kumina practices of the Myal religion.

The syncretized Christian version of Myal was generally tolerated by white enslavers because of its adoption of Christian elements. By the 1860s, Myal-based churches became referred to as "Revivalist" churches and were established as Baptist churches. From 1858 to 1859, a Myal revival swept Jamaica and was borne out through a syncretized Christian version called Revivalism adding energy to local religious life. This syncretism was necessary due to colonial suppression. Two branches of this revival, the 60 Order or Revival Zion and the 61 Order or Pocomania, emerged. Revival Zion adopted more orthodox Christian practices, while Pocomania retained more Myal practices.

Despite colonial suppression Myal was maintained by indigenous/tribal communities living in remote rural areas and still exists as a religious institution, though now it is not as widespread. In more urban areas, Myal survived through adaptation and Christian syncretism, which is born out through syncretic faiths like Revivalism, and Rastafari.

The Myal community is actively working to revitalize their traditions, preserve their cultural heritage, dispel myths, misinformation and colonial propaganda about their ancient spiritual tradition.

== Practices ==
=== Early Myalist religion ===
Myal is a spiritual practice rooted in healing, protection and the restoration of balance within individuals and communities. The Myal religion is primarily an Akan animist belief known as Akom. The wordage was later distorted by British scholars, due to the rarity of matrilineal African aboriginal peoples (such as the Akan and Bakongo peoples) which are largely patrilineal. They labelled the Akan practice of Akom with a Bakongo word Myal (Kikongo for 'intelligence') and the Bakongo practice of Nkisi as Kumina which is from the Akan word Ɔkom' to mean 'prophesy'.

Myalists honor a creator god known as Yankipong (from the Asante Twi Ɔnyankopong), nature spirits and the ancestors. These spirits are invoked in Myal rituals. Later in the 19th century, with the arrival of Congolese immigrants, other African practises were introduced, such as localized Nkisi known as Kumina.

=== Healing and herbalism ===
The Myal priest utilize spiritual practices for protection rather than for harm. The main social function of a Myal Priest is often as a herbalist. To assist with healing a client's ailments, the priest will often utilise baths, massages, and mixtures of various ingredients. "Bush baths" are often applied to relieve fevers and involve a range of different herbal ingredients placed within hot water. These often rely on a knowledge of the properties of various animal and herbal ingredients. Other elements may be employed to access the spirit world. Plants are believed to absorb cosmic properties from the sun, moon, and planets.

Historical terms found in Jamaica for benevolent Myal priests include "doctors," "professors," "one-eyed men," "doctormen," "do good men," or "four eye men." A number of the favored terms, such as "science-man," "scientist," "doctor-man" and "professor", emphasise modernity.

Being a ritual practitioner is often believed to pass hereditarily from a parent to their eldest child. Once a person has decided to pursue the practice, a person typically becomes the apprentice of an established Myal Priest. According to folk tradition, this apprenticeship should take place in the forest and last for a year, a notion that derives from older pre-Christian ideas. In practice, apprenticeships can last up to five or six years.

=== Revivalism ===
The Great Myal Revival took root because Myalists claimed the need to restore balance and cleanse evil from the land. Due to the oppressive colonial era legislation aimed at suppressing pre-Christian spirituality, Myalists in urban areas were forced to syncretize their practices with Christianity which led to the emergence of a new Christian sect that incorporated their Myal practices called Native Baptism which later evolved into what is now called Revivalism.

Revivalism has two sects: 60 order (or Zion Revival, the order of the heavens) and 61 order (or Pocomania, the order of the earth). 60 order contains more Christian syncretism and is more focused on spirits of air or the heavens and publicly distances itself from the more pre-Christian practices of Myal. 61 order is more grounded in Myal traditions and more focused on spirits of the earth. Revivalist sects continue to make pilgrimage to Myal sacred sites.

Most Revivalist faiths involve oral confessions, trances, dreams, prophesies, and ritual dancing. In Pocomania, male religious leaders are usually called "Shepherd", and in Revival Zion, the male leaders are called "Captain" or "Kapo". Female leaders are generally called "Mother".

This sect of Revivalism is more closely connected with the Akan derived Myal practices. Revivalism continues to retain the Akan funerary/war colours still present in Ashanti traditions. Other Akan elements include the use of swords and rings as a means to guard the spirit from spiritual attack. The Revivalist Leader (and the Myal Priest), has special two swords used to protect himself from witchcraft called an Akrafena or soul sword and a Bosomfena or spirit sword.

The Akan elements of Myal are best preserved in the Jamaican Maroon communities where they speak the Kromanti language.

== See also ==
- Akan religion
- Kumina
- Obeah
- Bob Marley
