= Obeah =

Afro-Caribbean healing and spellcasting tradition

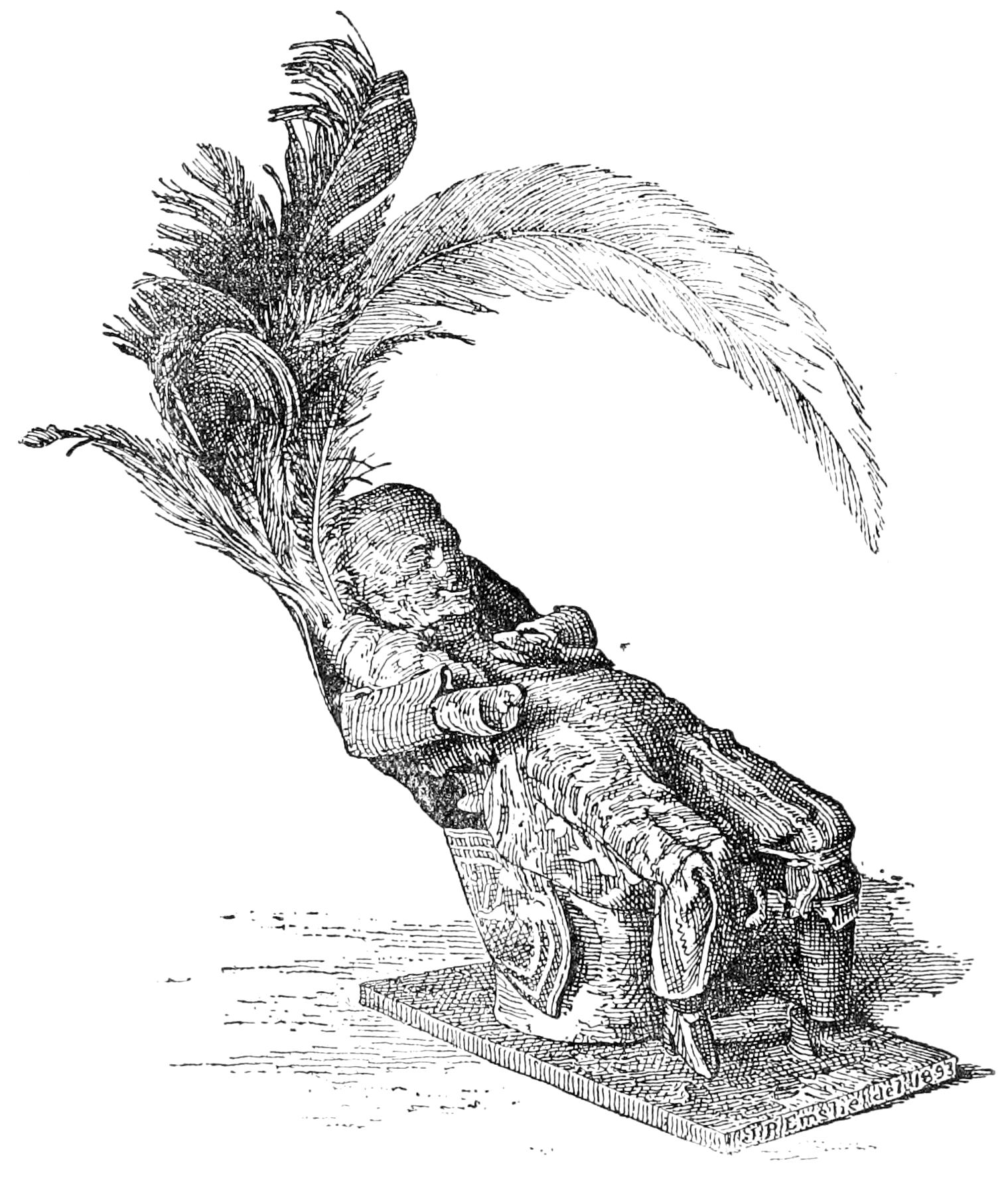
Illustration of a figurine confiscated from Alexander Ellis, an accused Obeahman in Morant Bay, Jamaica in 1887.

Obeah, also spelled Obiya, Obia, or Obi is a broad term for African diasporic religious, spell-casting, and healing traditions found primarily in the former British colonies of the Caribbean. These practices derive much from West African traditions but also incorporate elements of European and South Asian origin. Many of those who practice these traditions avoid the term Obeah due to the word's pejorative connotations in many Caribbean societies.

Central to Obeah are ritual specialists who offer a range of services to paying clients. These specialists have sometimes been termed Obeahmen and Obeahwomen, although often refer to themselves in other ways, for instance calling themselves "scientists", "doctors", or "professors". Important in these ritual systems is engagement with the spirits and the manipulation of supernatural forces. A prominent role is played by healing practices, often incorporating herbal and animal ingredients. Other services include attempts to achieve justice for a client or to provide them with spiritual protection. Cursing practices have also featured in Obeah, involving the making of objects to cause harm or the production of poisons. There is considerable regional and individual variation in the nature of the rituals that practitioners of Obeah have engaged in.

Amid the Atlantic slave trade of the 16th to 19th centuries, thousands of West Africans, many Ashanti were transported to Caribbean colonies controlled by the British Empire. Here, traditional African religious practices assumed new forms, for instance being employed for the protection of Maroon communities. Enslaved Africans also absorbed British influences, especially from Christianity, and later from the Hinduism and Islam introduced by indentured South Asian migrants. The colonial elites disapproved of African traditions and introduced laws to prohibit them, using the term Obeah as a general label for these practices from the 1760s on. This suppression meant that Obeah emerged as a system of practical rituals rather than as a broader communal religion akin to Haitian Vodou or Cuban Santería. After the British abolition of slavery in the 1830s, new laws were introduced against Obeah, increasingly portraying it as fraud, laws that remained following the end of imperial rule. Since the 1980s, Obeah's practitioners have campaigned to remove these legal restrictions, often under the aegis of religious freedom.

The term Obeah has been used for practices in the Caribbean nations of the Bahamas, Barbados, Belize, Grenada, Guyana, Jamaica, Saint Lucia, Saint Vincent and the Grenadines, Suriname, Trinidad and Tobago, and the Virgin Islands. Caribbean migrants have also taken these practices elsewhere, to countries like the United States, Canada, and United Kingdom. In many Caribbean countries Obeah remains technically illegal and widely denigrated, especially given the negative assessment towards it evident in religions like Evangelical Protestantism and Rastafari.

== Definitions and terminology ==
Obeah incorporates both spell-casting and healing practices, largely of African origin, although with European and South Asian influences as well. It is found primarily in the former British colonies of the Caribbean, namely Suriname, Jamaica, the Virgin Islands, Trinidad, Tobago, Guyana, Belize, the Bahamas, St Vincent and the Grenadines, and Barbados. Aside from the common use of Obeah, other spellings that have been used include Obiya, Obey, Obi, and Obia, the latter common in Suriname and French Guiana.

The term Obeah encompasses a varied range of traditions that are highly heterogenous and display much regional variation. The Hispanic studies scholars Margarite Fernández Olmos and Lizabeth Paravisini-Gebert defined Obeah as "a set of hybrid or creolized beliefs dependent on ritual invocation, fetishes, and charms", while the historian Diana Paton termed it "a very wide range of practices that, broadly speaking, invoke the ritual manipulation of spiritual power". For the historians Jerome Handler and Kenneth Bilby it was "a loosely defined complex involving supernatural practices largely related to healing and protection". The historian Thomas Waters called Obeah a "supernatural tradition", and described how it "blended West African rituals with herbalism, Islam, Christianity and even a smattering of British folk magic". The term was originally used by Europeans, according to Handler and Bilby, as "a catch-all term for a range of supernatural-related ideas and behaviours that were not of European origin and which they heavily criticized and condemned."

Throughout history, the term Obeah has rarely been used as a self-description of a person's own practices. In the Caribbean, practitioners of folk healing traditions are often reluctant to publicly describe what they do as Obeah; there are some people who will privately describe what they do as Obeah, but used other words publicly. Historically, those who were accused of practicing Obeah in criminal court rarely used that term itself. Some practitioners instead refer to it as "Science", or as working, doing a job, doing some good, practicing, clearing. In Jamaica, another term for Obeah is "iniquity," probably deriving from the repeated Protestant admonitions that Obeah was an iniquitous practice.

=== Relations with other religious traditions ===
Paton noted that, in encompassing a broad range of supernaturally-oriented practices, the term Obeah served a "roughly equivalent" role in the Anglophone Caribbean to the terms conjure and root work (or Hoodoo) in the United States and the Quimbois of Francophone Caribbean islands Guadeloupe and Martinique. Fernández Olmos and Paravisini-Gebert suggested that Quimbois was essentially "a variation of Obeah". Obeah has both similarities and differences with other Afro-Caribbean religious traditions such as Haitian Vodou or Cuban Santería and Palo. Unlike them, it lacks communal rituals or a system of liturgy, and in contrast to the followers of these traditions, there is little evidence that Obeah's practitioners have regarded it as "their religion". Fernández Olmos and Paravisini-Gebert took the view that Obeah was not a religion per se, but is a term applied to "any African-derived practice with religious elements". Obeah exists at the borders of what both Christians and social scientists have typically recognised as "religion," and as such it has historically often been classified not as religion but as "magic," "witchcraft," "superstition," or "charlatanism."

Across much of the Caribbean it is common for individuals to practise multiple religious traditions simultaneously. Many practitioners of Obeah attend Christian church services and do not see their practice as being at odds with Christianity. In Trinidad, various Obeah practitioners are also involved in the Orisha religion. In parts of the West Indies, South Asian migration has resulted in syncretisms between Obeah and Hinduism. In places with large South Asian communities like Guyana and Trinidad there are records of some Obeahmen being brahmins who also served as Hindu priests.

=== Etymology ===
One can imagine a scenario in which native English speakers in the British Caribbean, in Barbados or another early English colony, adopted the term from some African language[...] without being aware of its full meaning in that language group. The adopted term referred, or was related, to a type of slave healer who was involved with spiritual or magical practices, or the practices themselves which, although not fully understood by Europeans, were known to be of non-European origin.

— Handler and Bilby

Obeah is often used as a general term for Afro-Caribbean religion as a whole. Bilby noted that in these cases it was "a monolithic signifier for African or neo-African forms of religiosity or spirituality still existing in the Caribbean". However, throughout the Caribbean, there is "considerable disagreement" about the meaning of the term obeah; the term is malleable, and as Bilby notes, it has no "single, essential meaning". It has instead often been used in reference to several different things.

It is not known exactly how and when the term obeah came to be used in the Anglophone Caribbean. The earliest unambiguous use of it in the region was in a letter from Barbados from 1710, where it appeared as "Obia", and the term was more widely extant in Barbadian English by the 1720s and 1730s. In contemporary scholarship, there is general agreement that the word obeah is of West African origin, although there remain different arguments as to which language it derives from. Paton noted that the exact origins of the term were "unlikely to be definitively resolved". One argument is that it stems from Twi, one of the Akan languages. In this case, it may derive from obayifo, a Twi term generally translated as "witch", or from bayi, the term for the morally neutral supernatural force employed by the obayifo. In support of this origin is the fact that the term obeah proved prominent in the British Caribbean colonies, Suriname, and the Danish Virgin Islands, all areas where large numbers of Akan speakers from the Gold Coast were introduced.

A second possibility is that the word obeah comes from the Efik language. If so, it could derive from the Efik word for "doctor," or alternatively from the word ubio, often translated as "fetish". A third option traces it to the Igbo language, where a dibia was a ritual specialist involved in healing and other practices. Other proposals trace the word obeah to the Edo language obi, often translated as "poison", or the Yoruba language obi, a term for a type of divination. In support of these non-Akan origins is the fact that captives taken from the Bay of Biafra constituted a major part of the population in those parts of the Caribbean where the term obeah is earliest attested.

In many parts of the Caribbean, the word Obeah is reserved only for destructive ritual practices and regarded as a synonym for sorcery or witchcraft. In other places, the term is used in a fairly neutral manner to describe a form of spiritual power. This is the common understanding of the term among Maroon communities in Suriname and French Guiana, for example. Bilby noted that in this context, obeah was a concept akin to the Yoruba religious notion of aṣẹ, which is also found in Santería and Candomblé. He suggested that the positive use of the word obia here was because these Maroon communities had remained largely outside of European cultural domination. These Surinamese did believe in the negative use of supernatural power, but they called that wisi, a term derived from the English "witch".

Variants of the term Obeah also appeared among African-Americans in the South Carolina Lowcountry prior to the American Civil War. The term obeah seems to have been unknown in Francophone societies during the 17th and 18th centuries, but began to appear among French speakers in Martinique by the early 19th century.

== Beliefs and practices ==
During the period of enslavement, Obeah was primarily directed to goals that the enslaved people would have deemed beneficial, such as healing, locating missing property, protecting against illness and misfortune, and targeting the slave owners. Obeah revolves around one-to-one consultations between practitioners and their clients. Common goals in Obeah include attracting a partner, finding lost objects, resolving legal issues, getting someone out of prison, attracting luck for gambling or games, and wreaking revenge.

=== Spirits ===
Central to Obeah is the relationship between humans and spirits. Unlike other Afro-Caribbean religious traditions, such as Haitian Vodou and Cuban Santería, Obeah does not strictly centre around deities who manifest through divination and the possession of their worshippers. These spirits and deities can be "called" or summoned to assist the Obeah practitioner but are not worshipped. These spiritual forces are often deemed essentially morally neutral.

In various Caribbean cultures, it is believed that a spirit can attack someone either on its own initiative or because it has been sent to do so by an Obeah practitioner. In some contexts, the colour red is explained as countering the presence of duppies.

=== Obeahmen and obeahwomen ===
Obeahmen and obeahwomen are deemed able to bewitch and unwitch, heal, charm, tell fortunes, detect stolen goods, reveal unfaithful lovers, and command duppies. The historian Diana Paton referred to them as "spiritual workers" and "ritual specialists". Obeah is practiced by both males and females, typically referred to as obeahmen and obeahwomen respectively. However, various practitioners avoid calling what they do obeah. In the Bahamas, commonly used terms for a practitioner is Bush man or bush doctor; in Jamaica an iniquity worker, and in Trinidad a common term is Wanga man. In Grenada they are sometimes called Scientists, and in Guyana as Professor, Madame, Pundit, Maraj, and work-man. Historical terms found in Jamaica include "doctors," "professors," "one-eyed men," "doctormen," "do good men," or "four eye men." Practitioners of Quimbois are referred to as quimboiseurs, sorciers, and gadé zaffés. A number of the favored terms, such as "science-man," "scientist," "doctor-man" and "professor", emphasise modernity.

In Obeah tradition, it is typically believed that practitioners will be born with special powers; they are sometimes referred to as having been "born with the gift". It is taught that possession of these powers may be revealed to the individual through dreams or visions in late childhood or early adolescence. In Caribbean lore, it is sometimes believed that an Obeah practitioner will bear a physical disability, such as a blind eye, a club foot, or a deformed hand, and that their powers are a compensation for this.

Being an Obeah practitioner is often believed to pass hereditarily from a parent to their eldest child. Alternatively, someone may become a practitioner following a traumatic event. Once they have decided to pursue the practice, a person typically becomes the apprentice of an established obeahman or woman. According to folk tradition, this apprenticeship should take place in the forest and last for a year, a notion that derives from older African ideas. In practice, apprenticeships can last up to five or six years.

A practitioner's success in attracting clients is usually rooted in their reputation. Older obeahmen/women are usually regarded more highly than younger ones. They do not normally wear special clothing to mark out their identity. In many cases, they have practiced in secret, allowing them to operate even while their practices are illegal. In Trinidad and Tobago, 21st-century Obeah practitioners often advertise their services in the classified advert columns of newspapers.

==== Relationship with clients ====
Clients will typically pay for the services of an Obeah practitioner, the size of the fee often being connected to the client's means. This exchange of money for ritual services is long embedded. Part of this fee will be used to buy items necessary for the intended rituals, such as candles, rum, and fowl. There are a few examples of monetary payment being charged during the era of slavery. In an 1831 account from Jamaica, for instance, a slave named Polydore requested two dollars, a cock, and a pint of rum to heal a man he had made ill with his curse. Further evidence for the monetary nature of these transactions comes from the period after emancipation.

Among the Trinidadian cases regarding Obeah recorded from 1890 and 1930, the main reason clients approached a practitioner was work-related worries and aspirations; this was followed by attempts to deal with physical suffering, court cases, and relationship issues. Discussing the situation among Jamaicans and British Jamaicans in the 1970s, Venetia Newall noted that "respectable middle-class people" generally shunned Obeah but would sometimes turn to it during "times of stress".

=== Healing and herbalism ===
Obeah is often used for protection rather than for harm. The main social function of an Obeah practitioner is often as a herbalist. To assist with healing a client's ailments, the obeahman/woman will often utilise baths, massages, and mixtures of various ingredients. "Bush baths" are often applied to relieve fevers and involve a range of different herbal ingredients placed within hot water. These often rely on a knowledge of the properties of various animal and herbal ingredients. Graveyard dirt may be employed to access the spirit world.

In Obeah traditions, plants are believed to absorb cosmic properties from the sun, moon, and planets.

At a 1755 trial in Martinique, there were reports of amulets incorporating incense, holy water, pieces of the Eucharist, wax from an Easter candle, and small crucifixes.

Obeah bottles are much like the witch bottles used in early modern and modern Britain.

In various cases, Obeah rituals are performed to try and affect the outcome of a court case. A Jamaican case recorded in 1911 for instance involved the ritual specialist turning a key in a padlock while saying the name of an individual they wanted to prevent speaking in court. Another element of lore, recorded in 1978, maintained that holding a nutmeg in one's mouth while speaking on oath in court will help a person secure legal victory.

These religious practices can also be used in times of war. Various Maroons turned to them amid the Surinamese Interior War of the 1980s. Obeah has also been used by organised crime. When London gangster Mark Lambie was put on trial for kidnap and torture in 2002, both his victims and fellow gang members suggested that his powers of Obeah had made him "untouchable".

=== Divination ===
One recorded method of divination in Obeah entails placing a key inside a Bible, tying and binding the book to a thread, and then observing how the book turns while Psalm 50 is read. This is very similar to the Bible and key divination method used in Britain since at least the 17th century. In Guyana, South Asians have added chiromancy or palm reading to the divination styles employed by Obeah practitioners.

=== Harming and poisons ===
In various cases, a sudden death has been attributed to a bad spirit being set upon the deceased through Obeah. A common harming method in Obeah is spiking a person's food. One recurring notion is that a woman can win a man from her love rival by placing her own menstrual fluid in his food. In the Caribbean, love spells such as this are often deemed immoral as they are intended to deny a person their free will.

One method of lifting an Obeah curse, recorded from the Caribbean, involved a person crossing themselves and stating: "Bless the mark, and cross if off." Also reported in various 18th and early 19th-century sources was the notion that Christian baptism provided protection from Obeah.

A continuing source of anxiety related to Obeah was the belief that practitioners were skilled in using poisons, as mentioned in Matthew Lewis's Journal of a West India Proprietor. Many Jamaicans accused women of such poisonings; one case Lewis discussed was that of a young woman named Minetta, who was brought to trial for attempting to poison her master. Lewis and others often characterized the women they accused of poisonings as being manipulated by obeahmen, who they contended actually provided the women with the materials for poisonings.

They claimed that Obeah men stole people's shadows, and they set themselves up as the helpers of those who wished to have their shadows restored. Revivalists contacted spirits to expose the evil works they ascribed to the Obeah men and led public parades, which resulted in crowd hysteria that engendered violent antagonism against them. The public "discovery" of buried Obeah charms, presumed to be of evil intent, led on more than one occasion to violence against the rival Obeah practitioners. Conflicts between supposedly "good" and "evil" spiritual work could sometimes be found within plantation communities. In one 1821 case brought before court in Berbice, an enslaved woman named Madalon allegedly died as a result of being accused of malevolent obeah that caused the drivers at Op Hoop Van Beter plantation to fall ill. The man implicated in her death, a spiritual worker named Willem, conducted an illegal Minje Mama dance to divine the source of the Obeah, and after she was chosen as the suspect, she was tortured to death.

== History ==
=== Origins ===
Obeah practices largely derive from Ashanti origins. The Ashanti and other Twi-speaking peoples from the Gold Coast formed the largest group of enslaved people in the British Caribbean colonies. Obeah was first identified in the British colonies of the Caribbean during the 17th century.

Enslaved Africans who were transported to the Caribbean during the 17th or 18th centuries came from societies where spiritual power played a prominent role. Although there was considerable variation in the religious beliefs and practices of these African societies, all generally shared a belief that ancestors and spirits could act on the physical world and thus should be respected and cared for. All these African societies also had ritual specialists, individuals who engaged in divination and were deemed to have knowledge of powerful substances that could be used to either heal of harm other people. The West Europeans who oversaw Atlantic transportation also believed in an unseen world that could influence humanity, but typically divided it more strictly along ethical lines, adhering to a Christian belief in good forces aligned with God and evil forces aligned with the Devil. Early modern Europeans had also inherited the idea of the witch as a spiritually evil person. Paton noted that these European notions of witchcraft framed "European understandings of African spiritual work and ritual specialists in the Caribbean".

In British colonial communities, aside from referring to the set of spiritual practices, "Obeah" also came to refer to a physical object, such as a talisman or charm, that was used for evil magical purposes. The item was referred to as an Obeah-item (e.g. an 'obeah ring' or an 'obeah-stick', translated as: ring used for witchcraft or stick used for witchcraft respectively). Obeah incorporated various beliefs from the religions of later migrants to the colonies where it was present. Obeah also influenced other religions in the Caribbean, e.g. Christianity, which incorporated some Obeah beliefs.

=== Growing legal proscription ===
The notion that Obeah might be a force for generating solidarity among slaves and encouraging them to resist colonial domination was brought to the attention of European slave-owners due to several events in the 1730s. In Jamaica, the First Maroon War saw British forces fail to suppress the Jamaican Maroons, free Africans who employed spiritual protection as an important part of their fighting strategy. Obeah ritual specialists had played a prominent role within these Maroon communities; one of the best known was the Akan woman Nanny of the Maroons described as an old 'witch' and a 'Hagg' by English soldier Philip Thicknesse in his memoirs. Colonial sources claimed she could quickly grow food for her starving forces, and to catch British bullets and either fire them back or attack the soldiers with a machete. Meanwhile, in Antigua in 1736, an alleged slave conspiracy to attack Europeans was exposed, its ringleaders arrested, and 47 people executed. Interrogations revealed that the conspirators engaged in religious ceremonies and offered religious oaths, in at least one case administered by an "Obiaman" named Quawcoo. According to this account, Quawcoo had also used divination to determine an auspicious time for the uprising. In various cases, Obeah rituals might encourage "courage and morale" during such rebellions.

Be it therefore enacted ... that from and after the First Day of June (1760), any Negro or other Slave, who shall pretend to any supernatural Power, and be detected in making use of any Blood, Feathers, Parrots Beaks, Dogs teeth, Alligators Teeth, broken Bottles, Grave Dirt, Rum, Egg-shells, or any other Materials relative to the Practice of Obeah or Witchcraft, in order to delude and impose on the Minds of others, shall upon conviction thereof, before two Magistrates and three Freeholders, suffer Death or Transportation.

— 1760 Jamaican law against Obeah

Fearing that Obeah's practitioners might incite anti-colonial rebellions, European colonial authorities increasingly saw Obeah as a threat to the stability on their plantations and criminalised it. In 1733, Governor Philip Gardelin issued a clause to the Danish West Indian slave code proscribing various ritual practices; rather than referring to this as Obeah, he used the word towernarye, probably derived from the Dutch word tovernery. It was in the aftermath of Tacky's War, a rebellion against the colonial authorities, that the Jamaican Assembly first passed laws that banned Obeah in 1760. This law took the term Obeah, which was previously rarely used, and gave it a legal definition. During the rebellion, Tacky is said to have consulted an Obeahman who prepared for his forces a substance that would make them immune to bullets, which boosted their confidence in executing the rebellion. The European colonial fear of Afro-Caribbean traditions was furthered following the successful Haitian Revolution, in which various revolutionaries were allegedly practitioners of Vodou.

Early Jamaican laws against Obeah reflected Christian theological viewpoints, characterising it as "pretending to have communication with the devil" or "assuming the art of witchcraft." Negative assessments, often reflecting racist attitudes, were also apparent in 18th century writings that discussed Obeah, such as Edward Long's History of Jamaica (1774) and Bryan Edward's History, Civil and Commercial, of the British Colonies in the West Indies (1793), which also emphasised the notion that it was not religion but witchcraft or magic. The practice of obeah with regards to healing led to the Jamaican 18th and 19th century traditions of "doctresses", such as Grace Donne (who nursed her lover, Simon Taylor (sugar planter)), Sarah Adams, Cubah Cornwallis, Mary Seacole, and Mrs Grant (who was the mother of Mary Seacole). These doctresses practised the use of hygiene and the applications of herbs decades before they were adopted by European doctors and nurses.

As the British Empire expanded through the Caribbean during the late 18th and early 19th centuries, so the term obeah was diffused through these colonies. This colonial suppression eradicated the African-derived communal rituals that involved song, dance, and offerings to spirits. In the British Caribbean, communal rituals oriented towards deities only persevered in pockets, as with Obeah in Jamaica and Orisha in Trinidad. The historian Diana Paton has argued that the laws introduced to restrict African-derived practices contributed to the developing idea that these varied traditions could be seen as a singular phenomenon, Obeah.

Afro-Caribbeans often concealed Obeah from Europeans. There were nevertheless Europeans who believed in Obeah's power; there are records of some plantation owners getting Obeah practitioners to cast spells over their fields to deter thieves.

=== Post-emancipation ===
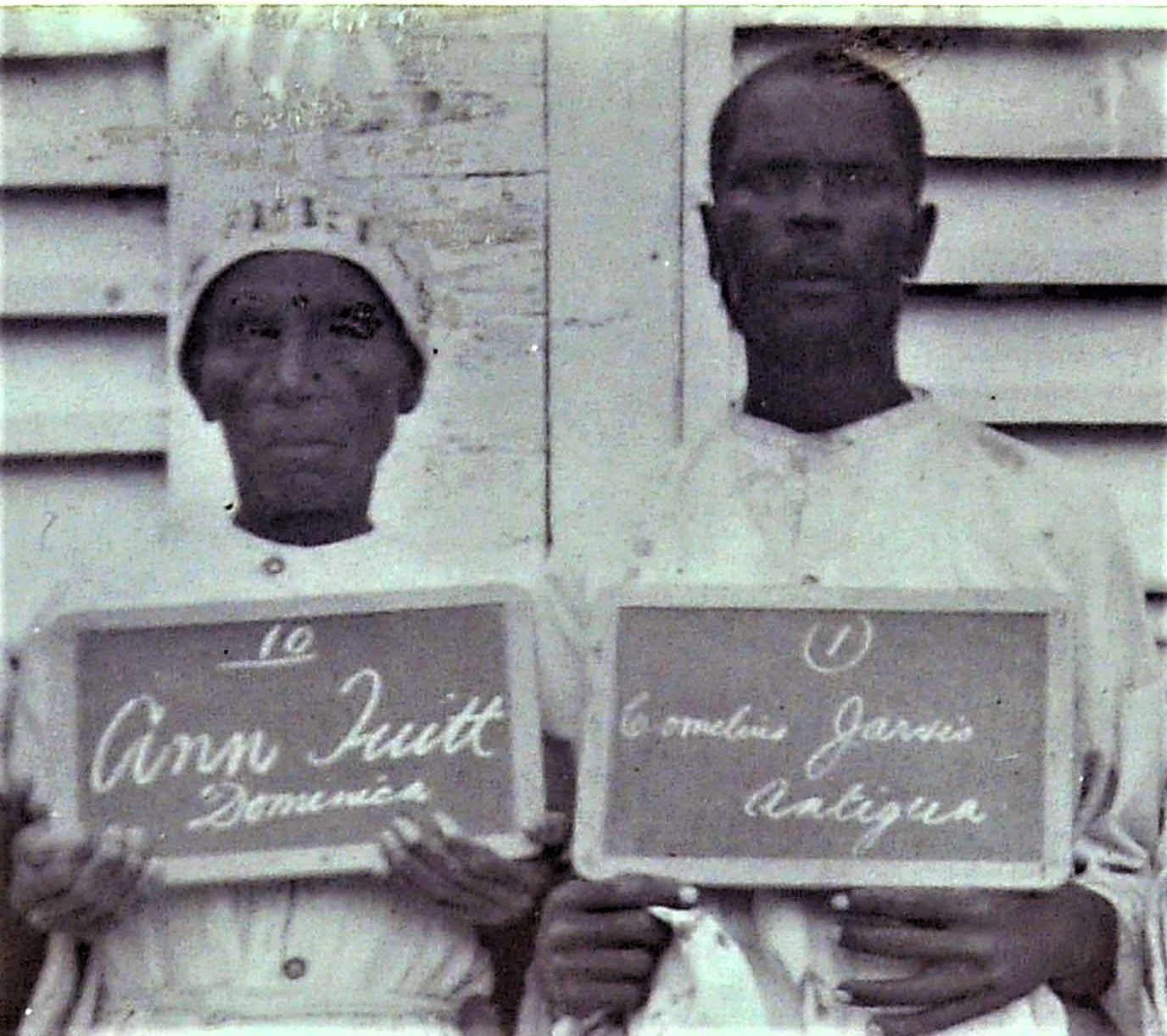
Two imprisoned Obeah practitioners in Antigua, part of a group photographed in 1905.

After the abolition of slavery in the British Empire in 1834, Europeans in the West Indies continued to be troubled by the influence of Obeah within Afro-Caribbean communities. Existing laws against Obeah had typically applied only to enslaved people and so new laws to proscribe the practice were required. Between 1838 and 1920 a new raft of measures against Obeah and related practices appeared throughout the Caribbean. In Jamaica, for example, new legal proscriptions against Obeah, which was to punished with hard labour and the lash, came in 1856.

These new laws largely downgraded the severity with which Obeah was punished but also expanded the scope of what would be considered part of it; as Forde noted, Obeah became "an extremely inclusive and amorphous criminal category". In some cases authorities also prohibited the publication or circulation of written material pertaining to Obeah. Several of these laws, including those in Trinidad and Tobago, British Guiana, Barbados, and Jamaica, emphasised the idea that Obeah would be regarded as fraud. This contributed to the notion of Obeah practitioners as fraudsters and charlatans that became dominant among European-Caribbean elites. This approach was influenced by ongoing efforts in Britain to suppress fortune tellers and astrologers there; such prosecutions were thought to weed out "superstition" and thus seen as part of the empire's civilising mission.

Obeah, or as it is called in some of the islands Wanga, may be described as the art of imposing upon the credulity of ignorant persons by means of feathers, bones, teeth, hairs, cat's claws, rusty nails, pieces of cloth, dirt, and other rubbish, usually contained in a wallet. The obeah man is usually dirty and unkempt, with a slouching gait and averted face. The cult sometimes develops into poisoning, by means of ground glass, arsenic, or prepared vegetable extracts.

— Frank Cundall, the British founder of the Institute of Jamaica, in 1908

The trials of those prosecuted reveal that in this period, clients were typically approaching Obeah specialists for assistance with health, employment, luck, or success in business or legal entanglements. In various cases the police used entrapment to arrest practitioners of Obeah. There is also evidence that the prosecutions were often assisted by those outside the police; according to recorded Jamaican cases, at least half of arrests for Obeah practice resulted from co-operation with non-police. These individuals may have felt cheated by the Obeah specialist, believing that the latter failed to deliver as promised or had overcharged them, and so turned them into the police. The accused repeatedly defended themselves by maintaining that what they practised did not constitute Obeah. In some cases, such as that of Montserrat-based Charles "Tishum" Dolly, who was convicted five times, the prosecutions served to provide them with greater publicity for their services.

The work of police and other state officials often provided much of the evidence used by early scholars of Obeah. An exhibition of material obtained from convicted Obeah practitioners was for instance included at the Jamaica International Exhibition in Kingston in 1891. This material was used as a partial basis for May Robinson's 1893 article on Obeah in Folk-Lore, which in turn influenced the research of Martha Beckwith and Joseph Williams in Jamaica in the 1920s.

Hundreds of thousands of South Asians, and a smaller number of Chinese, arrived in the Caribbean largely as indentured laborers. They brought with them their own religions which also fed into Obeah.

In the late 19th and early 20th centuries, there is evidence that many Obeah practitioners had travelled between different Caribbean islands. Given certain similarities between Obeah and the Cuban religion of Palo, it is possible that Obeah practices were introduced to adherents of the latter system amid Jamaican migration to Cuba from 1925 onward.

=== Post-colonial history ===
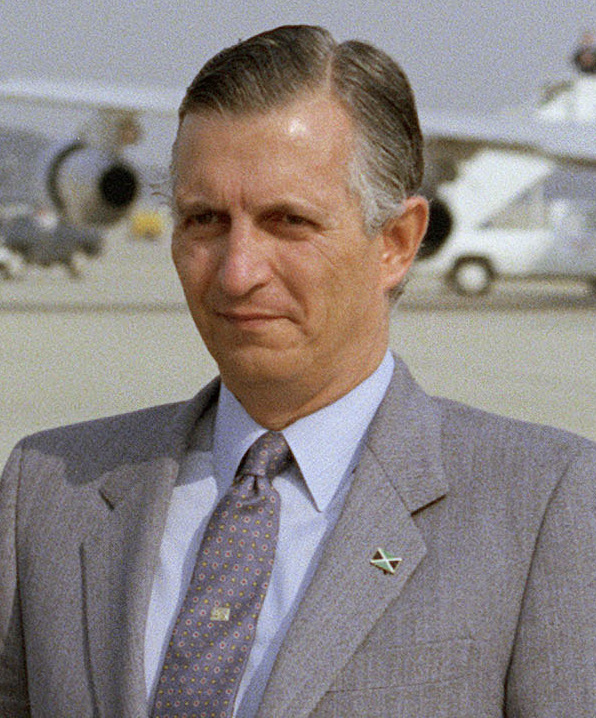
Jamaican Prime Minister Edward Seaga described Obeah as part of the Caribbean's cultural heritage

Obeah came more into the open with the waning of British colonialism in the Caribbean. Around the 1940s, Jamaican prosecutions for Obeah began to reduce. Two years after Jamaica became independent, in 1964, the country saw its last conviction for Obeah. Reflecting changing attitudes, Jamaica's Prime Minister Edward Seaga described Obeah as a form of faith healing and a part of Caribbean cultural heritage. In 1981, Jamaica's formal gift for the wedding of Britain's Prince Charles and Lady Diana Spencer was an obeah-influenced painting by Mallica Reynolds.

The late 20th century saw growing migration from the West Indies to metropolitan urban centres like Miami, New York, Toronto, and London, where practitioners of Obeah interacted with followers of other Afro-Caribbean traditions like Santeria, Vodou, and Espiritismus. Some communities of Obeah practitioners are trying to develop communal rituals.

Since the 1980s there have been efforts to decriminalise Obeah practices throughout many Caribbean countries. These calls have sometimes emphasised the idea that Obeah should be permitted under the aegis of freedom of religion, although critics have objected by maintaining that Obeah is not a religion. Paton noted that Obeah lacked the "self-confident promoters and interpreters" to advance its case that had been found within Vodou, Santería, and Candomblé. The decriminalisation movement has nevertheless had successes; Anguilla removed proscriptions against it in 1980, Barbados in 1998, Trinidad and Tobago in 2000, and St Lucia in 2004. However, as of the early 21st century these practices remain widely illegal across the region, including in Jamaica. Enforcement is often lax and usually only when Obeah practitioners have also infringed on other laws. Most prosecutions center on accusations of charlatanism against Obeah practitioners who have charged large fees and not produced the promised results.

== Demographics ==
Practitioners of Obeah are found across the Caribbean as well as in the United States, Canada, and United Kingdom. It is difficult to ascertain the number of clients who employ Obeahmen and Obeahwomen. In contexts like London, not all of those employing the Obeah specialists are of African-Caribbean background.

Trinidad had fewer cases of people practicing Obeah than Jamaica. In Trinidad, there was discrimination of what was a religion practice or what was considered Obeah. The reason was the cultural differences of the blacks and East Indian races living in Trinidad and Tobago .

== Reception and influence ==
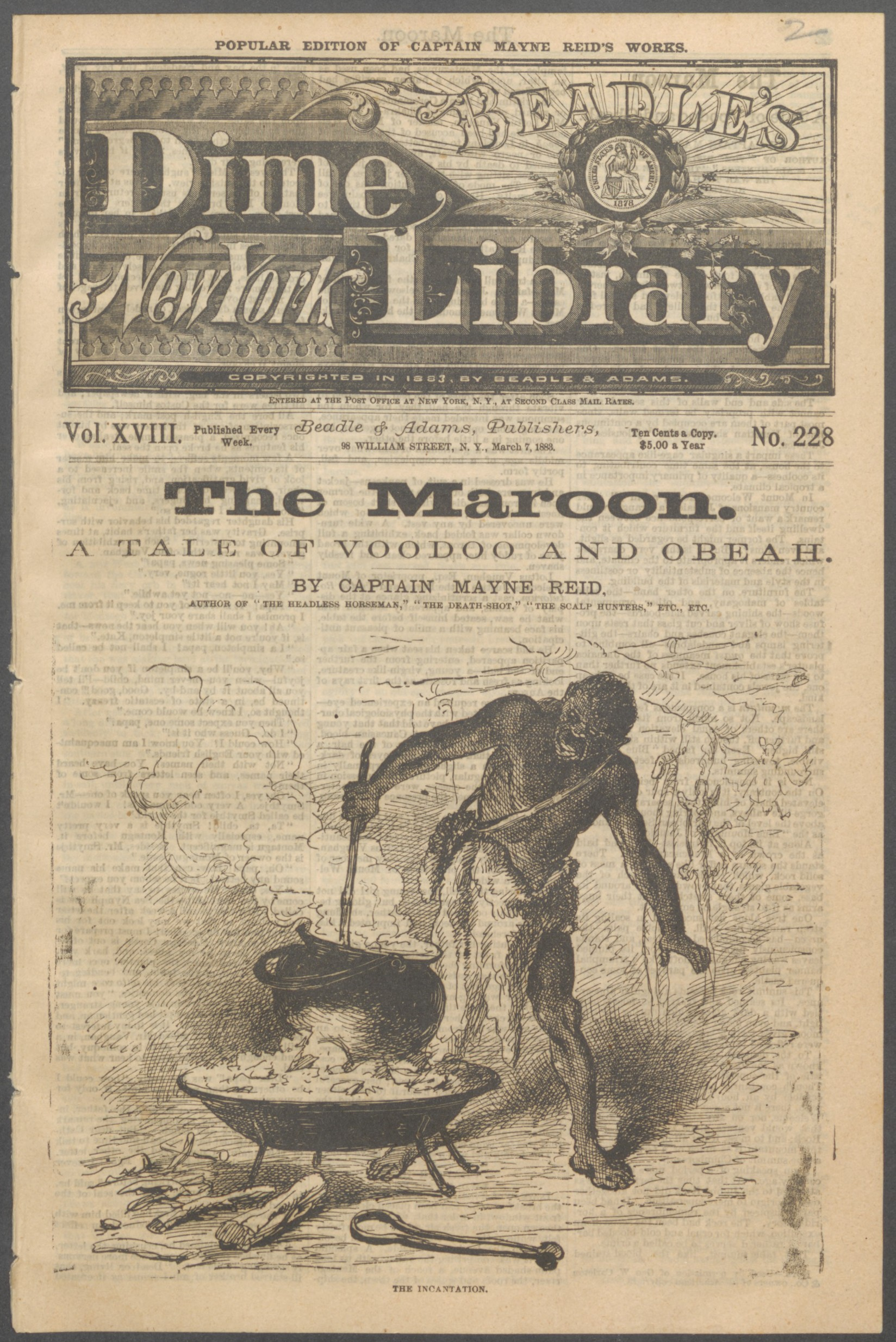
Cover of an 1883 edition of Thomas Mayne Reid's The Maroon: A Tale of Voodoo and Obeah

Written accounts of Obeah in the 19th and 20th century were largely produced by white visitors to the Caribbean who saw the tradition and its practitioners as being sinister. As Paton noted, "for a long time obeah was the ultimate signifier of the Caribbean's difference from Europe, a symbol of the region's supposed inability to be part of the modern world."

Official views of Obeah throughout the Caribbean have been consistently negative, while many people in the Caribbean regard Obeah as a dangerous and hostile phenomenon. Ongoing stigma surrounding Obeah is partly due to the opposition of Protestant Evangelicalism. Also hostile to Obeah are Rastafari, who regard it as a reflection of the oppressive and un-Godly forces that they term "Babylon". For these critics, Obeah is deemed fundamentally immoral, and often explicitly Satanic. Attempts to repurpose the term Obeah in a more positive fashion have come largely from academia and from culturally nationalist politics.

In various Caribbean countries, singers and musical groups have adopted the term "Obeah" in their name. An early example of this was the Bahamian singer Tony McKay, who cultivated the nickname "Exuma, the Obeah Man" after the title of his 1970 song. Bilby argued that in these cases, the use of the term was a "gesture towards reclaiming ancestral power". Elsewhere in Caribbean music, Obeah has been used as a theme for the humorous exploration of gender relations, as in Mighty Sparrow's 1966 song "Obeah Wedding," or has been denounced as harmful, as in The Ethiopians' 1977 reggae song "Obeah Book".

== See also ==
- Obeah and wanga
