= Colony of Santiago =

Former Spanish colony in the Caribbean

Coordinates: 18°10′48″N 77°24′00″W

Spanish Santiago Santiago
- 1509–1655
- Status: Colony of Spain; part of the Spanish West Indies, Captaincy General of Santo Domingo
- Capital: Villa de la Vega
- Common languages: Spanish; Taíno

Government
  - King of Spain: Ferdinand II of Aragon (First); Charles II of Spain (Last)
- Governor
  - 1510–1514: Juan de Esquivel (First)
  - 1656–1660: Cristóbal Arnaldo Isasi (Last)
- History
  - Established: 1509
  - Disestablished: 1655
- Currency: Spanish dollar
Preceded by	Succeeded by
Taíno	Cayman Islands; Colony of Jamaica
- Today part of: Jamaica

Santiago was a Spanish territory of the Spanish West Indies and within the Viceroyalty of New Spain, in the Caribbean region. Its location is the present-day island and nation of Jamaica.

== Pre-Columbian Jamaica ==
Around 650 AD, Jamaica was discovered by the people of the Ostionoid culture, who likely came from South America. Alligator Pond in Manchester Parish and Little River in St. Ann Parish are among the earliest known sites of the Ostionoid people, who lived near the coast and extensively hunted turtles and fish.

Around 950 AD, the people of the Meillacan culture settled on both the coast and the interior of Jamaica, either absorbing the Ostionoid people or co-inhabiting the island with them.

The Arawak–Taíno culture developed on Jamaica around 1200 AD. They brought from South America a system of raising yuca known as "conuco." To add nutrients to the soil, the Taíno burned local bushes and trees and heaped the ash into large mounds, into which they then planted yuca cuttings. Most Taíno lived in large circular buildings (bohios), constructed with wooden poles, woven straw, and palm leaves. The Taino spoke an Arawakan language and did not have writing. Some words used by them, such as barbacoa ("barbecue"), hamaca ("hammock"), kanoa ("canoe"), tabaco ("tobacco"), yuca, batata ("sweet potato"), and juracán ("hurricane"), have been incorporated into both Spanish and English.

== Columbus ==
Christopher Columbus set sail on his second voyage to the Americas on September 24, 1493. On November 3, 1493, he landed on an island that he named Dominica. On November 22, he landed on Hispaniola and spent some time exploring the interior of the island for gold. He left Hispaniola on April 24, 1494, and arrived at the island of Juana (Cuba) on April 30 and Jamaica (called "Xaymaca" by the indigenous Taíno, meaning "land of springs") on May 5. Columbus named the island Santiago and used it as a mini-state for his family.

He explored the south coast of Juana before returning to Hispaniola on August 20. After staying for a time on the western end, present-day Haiti, he finally returned to Spain. Columbus returned to Jamaica during his fourth voyage to the Americas. He had been sailing around the Caribbean nearly a year when a storm beached his ships in St. Ann's Bay, Jamaica, on June 25, 1503.

For a year Columbus and his men remained stranded on Jamaica. A Spaniard, Diego Mendez, and some natives paddled a canoe to get help from Hispaniola. The island's governor, Nicolás de Ovando y Cáceres, detested Columbus and obstructed all efforts to rescue him and his men. In the meantime, Columbus allegedly mesmerized the natives by correctly predicting a lunar eclipse for February 29, 1504, using the Ephemeris of the German astronomer Regiomontanus. Help finally arrived from the governor on June 29, 1504, and Columbus and his men arrived in Sanlúcar de Barrameda, Castile, on November 7, 1504. In 1505 Juan de Guzman, Duke of Medina Sidonia, in an agreement with Columbus proposed a project to populate the island but King Ferdinand turned it down.

== Etymology ==
The Taino referred to the island as "Xaymaca," but the Spanish gradually changed the name to "Jamaica." In the so-called Admiral's map of 1507, the island was labeled as "Jamaiqua"; and in Peter Martyr's first tract from the Decades of the New World (published 1511—1521), he refers to it as both "Jamaica" and "Jamica."

== New Seville and St Jago de la Vega ==
Second voyage of Columbus, 1493

Fourth voyage of Columbus, 1503

In 1509 the first Spanish settlement on the island was founded near St Ann's Bay and Santa Gloria. The settlement was named Sevilla la Nueva (or "New Seville"). The Spanish Empire began its official governance of Jamaica that year. At this time, Columbus's son, Diego, instructed conquistador Juan de Esquivel to formally occupy Jamaica in his name. (Note: Esquivel had accompanied Columbus in his second trip to the Americas in 1493 and participated in the invasion of Hispaniola.) (Note: A decade later, Friar Bartolomé de las Casas wrote Spanish authorities about Esquivel's conduct during the Higüey massacre of 1503.) As early as 1510 Esquivel was officially appointed governor and the island was incorporated into the Viceroyalty of New Spain. Starting in 1510, a Jewish community sprang up in Jamaica, mainly comprising traders and merchants who were looking to avoid religious persecution back home. They were forced, however, to lead secret lives on the island, often calling themselves "Portugalis."

In 1534 the settlers moved to a new, healthier site away from the malaria infested marsh lands. Founded by the colonial governor of Jamaica, Francisco de Garay, they named it Our Lady of the Blessed Villa de la Vega (or, simply, Villa de la Vega). (Note: The English renamed it "Spanish Town" after they conquered the island and officially claimed it under the 1667 Treaty of Madrid.) (Note: This settlement served as the capital of both Spanish and English Jamaica from its foundation in 1534 until 1872. The island's capital was moved to its current location, at Kingston in 1872.) The oldest cathedral in Jamaica was built there. Other settlements established by the Spanish included Esquivel (now Old Harbour Bay), Oristan (Bluefields), Savanna-la-Mar, Manterias (Montego Bay), Las Chorreras (Ocho Rios), Oracabeza, Puerto Santa Maria (Port Maria), Mellila (Annotto Bay) and Puerto Anton. Partially due to absence of any gold or silver deposits, there were never significant Spanish communities on the island. (Note: Historians consider this a contributing factor as to why it was so easily occupied by the British in 1655.)

In 1595, pirates, buccaneers, and English privateers began to attack the island with some frequency. These attacks were a challenge to the papal bull that stated all territories of the New World belonged to the kingdoms of Castile and Portugal. In 1597, English privateer Anthony Shirley landed on Jamaica and plundered the island, marching on St Jago de la Vega with the help of a Taino guide. There, he sacked the town. Governor Fernando Melgarejo tried to protect the island from pirate raids, and in 1603 he successfully repelled an attack by Christopher Newport. Other major attacks followed in 1603, 1640, and 1643.

== Early seventeenth century ==
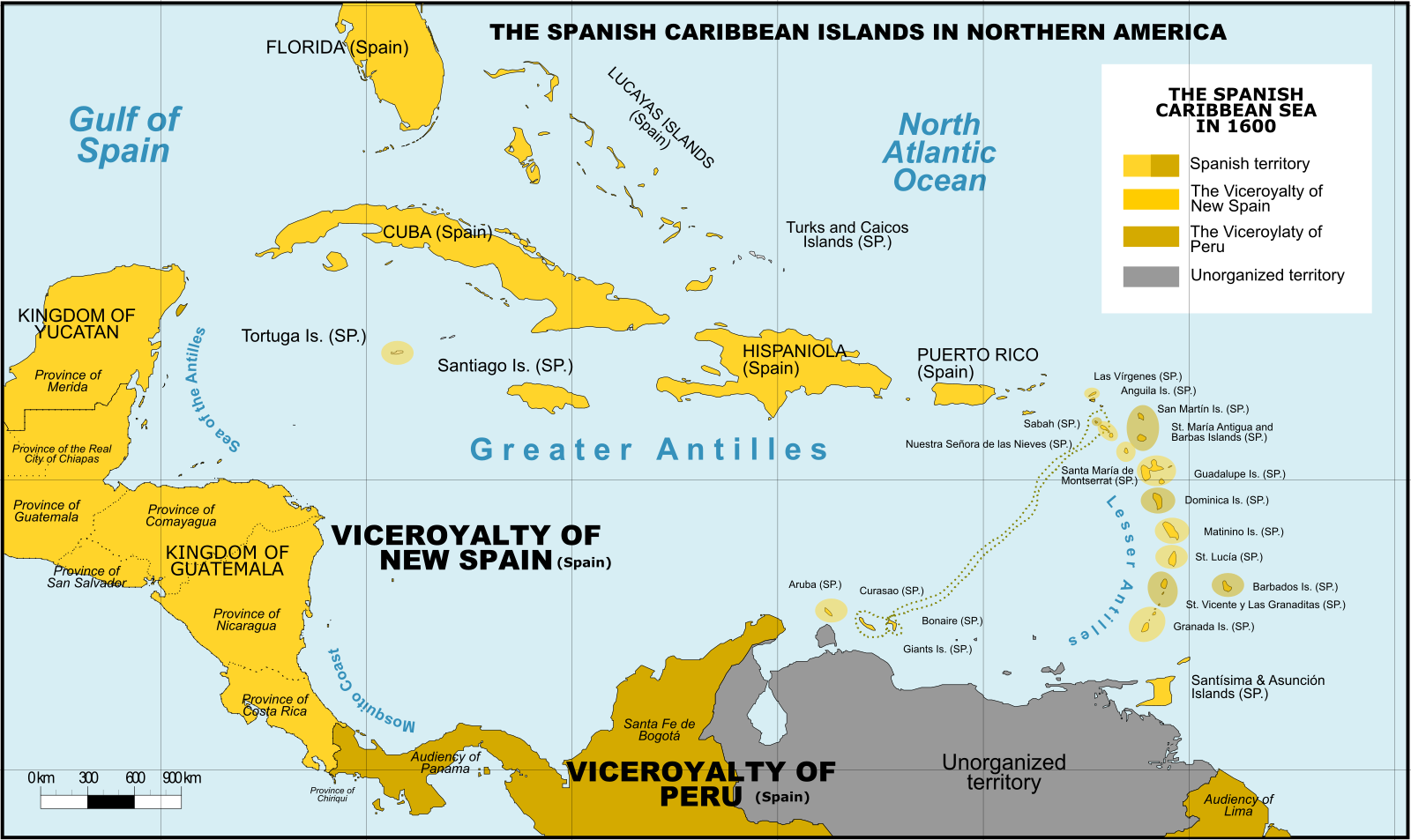
European colonies in the Caribbean in 1600

In 1611, the population of Spanish Jamaica was 1,510, including 696 Spaniards, 107 free people of color, 74 Tainos, 558 black slaves, and 75 "foreigners". That census, however, did not include those Taino who had fled to the mountainous interior, where they mingled with freed and run-away African slaves, and became the ancestors to the Jamaican Maroons of Nanny Town.

The Spaniards enslaved many of the native people, overworking and harming them to the point that most had perished within fifty years of European arrival. Subsequently, the lack of indigenous opportunity for labour was mended with the arrival of African slaves. Disappointed in the lack of gold on the isle, the Spanish mainly used Jamaica as a military base to supply colonizing efforts in the mainland Americas.

== English conquest ==
In 1643, pirate William Jackson landed at Caguaya, marched on St Jago de la Vega, and plundered it. Oliver Cromwell launched the Western Design armada against Spain's colonies in the Caribbean. In April 1655, General Robert Venables led the armada in an attack on Spain's fort at Santo Domingo, Hispaniola. The Spanish repulsed this poorly-executed attack known as the Siege of Santo Domingo, however, and the English troops were soon decimated by disease.

Weakened by fever and looking for an easy victory following their defeat at Santo Domingo, the English force then sailed for Jamaica, the only Spanish West Indies island that did not have new defensive works. In May 1655, around 7,000 English soldiers landed near Jamaica's Spanish Town capital. The English army, led by the English Admiral Sir William Penn and General Robert Venables, soon overwhelmed the small number of Spanish troops. (Note: at the time of the invasion, Jamaica's entire population only numbered around 2,500).) Most of the Spanish colonists fled after freeing their slaves, who scattered throughout the mountain regions and joined the growing refugee community of Maroons. (Note: Maroons were slaves who had previously escaped from the Spanish to live with the Taínos. The Jamaican Maroons fought the British during the 18th century.)

In the following years, Spain made repeated attempts to recapture Jamaica. The Jewish community of the colony, in an effort to help prevent any future recovery of the island by Spain (and a renewal of the persecution they had suffered under the previous Spanish rule), encouraged the English governor to make the colony a base for pirates and privateers. They reasoned that with pirates installed on the island, the Spanish would be deterred from further attacks. English officials agreed with this strategy. In response, the English governor of Jamaica, Edward D'Oyley, invited buccaneers to base themselves at Port Royal, starting in 1657. They helped to defend the region against Spanish attacks. Spain never recaptured Jamaica, losing the Battle of Ocho Rios in 1657 and the Battle of Rio Nuevo in 1658. When the Spanish Maroon leader, Juan de Bolas, switched sides and joined the English, the Spanish acting governor Cristóbal Arnaldo Isasi finally conceded defeat in his attempts to reconquer the island. In 1660 Jamaica became a refuge for Jews, and attracted those who had been expelled from Spain, Portugal, and other Spanish colonies.

For England, the Colony of Jamaica was to be the "...dagger pointed at the heart of the Spanish Empire..." although in fact it was a possession of little economic value then. Spain did not recognize Jamaica as an English colony until 1670 with the signing of that year's Treaty of Madrid when Spain finally gave Jamaica and the Cayman Islands to England.

== See also ==
- History of Jamaica
- Jamaicans of Spanish descent
- Spanish Governors of Santiago

== Sources ==
- Atkinson, Lesley-Gail (2006). The Earliest Inhabitants: The Dynamics of the Jamaican Taíno. Jamaica: University of the West Indies Press. pp. 3, 6, 107. ISBN 978-976-640-149-8.
- Black, Clinton V. (1965). History of Jamaica (3rd ed.). London: Collins Clear-Type Press. ISBN 978-0-00-329345-6.
- Coward, Barry (2002). The Cromwellian Protectorate. Manchester University Press. ISBN 978-0-7190-4317-8.
- Rodger, N.A.M. (2005). The Command of the Ocean. New York. ISBN 0-393-06050-0.
