= John Gregory (governor) =

Jamaican-born colonial administrator (1688–1764)

The Honourable John Gregory

Governor of Jamaica
- In office 1735–1735
- Monarch: King George II
- Preceded by: John Ayscough
- Succeeded by: Henry Cunningham
- In office 1736–1738
- Monarch: King George II
- Preceded by: Henry Cunningham
- Succeeded by: Edward Trelawny
- In office 1748–1748
- Monarch: King George II
- Preceded by: Edward Trelawny
- Succeeded by: Edward Trelawny

Personal details
- Born: 1688 St. Catherine, Jamaica
- Died: 1764 (aged 76) Conduit Street, St George's Square, London, England
- Spouse: Lucretia Favell

Military service
- Allegiance: Kingdom of Great Britain
- Rank: Commander-in-Chief of Jamaica & American Territories
- Battles/wars: First Maroon War

John Gregory (1688–1764) was a Jamaican-born colonial administrator, slave-owner, and military official in the eighteenth century British colony of Jamaica who acted as Governor of Jamaica three times, served as Chief Justice of Jamaica twice, and served as the President of the Legislative Council of Jamaica, Commander-In-Chief, and Chancellor of the colony of Jamaica and the territories theron depending in America during and following the period of the First Maroon War.

== Early life & Family Relations ==
John Gregory was born in 1688 in Spanish Town, Saint Catherine Parish, Colony of Jamaica, the offspring of Matthew Gregory and his wife Jane Archer. He was the brother of Matthew Gregory, a major planter, politician, and Benefactor of The University of Pennsylvania, who is mentioned in the letters of Simon Taylor, the wealthiest planter on the island, 35 times.. Taylor spoke of Dr. Gregory with a mixture of caution and amicability, once mentioning that Matthew had made himself "a perfect master" in regard to one dispute. At the time of his death, Matthew held ownership of 713 enslaved individuals, and the Jamaican Quit Rent books for 1754 list him as the owner of 300 acres in St Catherine, 99 acres in St Dorothy, and 2036 acres in St John, totalling 2435 acres.

== Career ==
By 1717, Gregory had taken his seat on the Legislative Council of Jamaica. In the context of disputes between the Jamaican assembly and council over the Hamilton repayment and revenue measures (autumn 1718), a contemporary account records a controversy in which Gregory was accused of having thrown an assembly message off the council table and kicking it.

The incident formed part of a wider breakdown in relations between the two bodies, as the assembly resisted the council’s position and asserted that settlers retained the full “rights, liberties, and privileges of Englishmen,” an argument later central to the framing of the perpetual revenue bill in 1722.

Charles Leslie, a Barbadian writer who authored A New and Exact History of Jamaica, described Gregory in 1740 as a man:

...who always acted with that firmness and prudence which became one in such an eminent station; his character is to be strictly honest, and severely just; no motives could ever persuade him to forgive the crimes of convicts, nor could the solicitations or prayers of the most considerable, induce him to deviate from the known laws and rules of justice.

Gregory's first stint as Chief Justice of Jamaica began in 1733, and that same year he was appointed as an Agent for Jamaica in Great Britain. As a member of the Legislative Council of Jamaica since 1717, Gregory rose to the position of President from 1735 to 1751. During gubernatorial vacancies, the Presidency invested Gregory with senior executive authority, requiring him to serve as the island's acting head of state. By 8 September 1736, he was also Commander-In-Chief and Chancellor of Jamaica and the territories theron depending in America. In 1736, Maroons on both sides of the island launched a number of incursions into planter territory. In 1737, there were more Maroon attacks on estates in coastal areas. Gregory began to consider offering peace terms to the Maroons, because the British forces were unable to defeat them, while he authorised the construction of barracks at Manchioneal, Jamaica in Portland, Norman's Valley in Saint James Parish, Jamaica, and at Bagnell's Thicket. However, the building of barracks was expensive, and some planters refused to take part in funding it, claiming the Maroons never troubled them.

Many of the following dispatches were directed to Thomas Pelham-Holles, 1st Duke of Newcastle, whose role as Secretary of State for the Southern Department vested him with supreme civilian jurisdiction over the West Indian colonies, and made him one of a few of the highest civilian authorities in the British Empire.

=== Counter-insurgency strategy and the "Black Regiment" proposal ===
On the 23 November 1736, Gregory wrote to the Duke of Newcastle, forwarding an address from the legislature of Jamaica,

"The country has for these three months been undisturbed by the rebel negroes, from what cause I do not well conceive: our success against them has not been considerable nor their numbers lessened that we certainly know of. It has indeed been reported that they had smallpox amongst them and that several have died, but I do not think that report much to be depended on. Our parties have not yet been able to discover their main settlement called Capt. Cudjo's Town, from whence they used to send small parties by surprise to rob and disturb the inhabitants."

Gregory addressed the logistical difficulties of the conflict, suggesting that white militias were physically ill-suited for the interior terrain compared to the Maroons led by Cudjoe:

"Could we be secure they would continue thus quiet, it would be prudent to let them alone unless we had the prospect of effectually destroying them which I have little reason to expect by parties of white men who cannot sufficiently bear the fatigues of travelling over mountains and woods. It must be done by their own colour, if we could safely trust such a body together with arms. I have used my endeavours to propose a treaty to such as have been out for the space of five years promising them liberty and lands to cultivate if they would submit on condition that they would clear the woods of such as resolve to stand out, and entertain no more amongst them.”

In response to Gregory's proposition to form a regiment of 200 enslaved men whose freedom would be purchased by the Crown, the Council of Trade and Plantations wrote from Whitehall:

"We observe the president has proposed the forming a regiment of 200 negro slaves, that H.M. should purchase their freedom, and that they should be put under a British establishment with regard to pay. By such a regiment the president has expressed some hopes of being able to reduce the rebels. But, although we may be of opinion with the president that negroes inured to the heat of the climate may be better able to bear the fatigues attending any expedition through the woods, yet we can by no means give our opinion in favour of such a proposition, because, should this black regiment be inclined to favour those of their own colour they would prove a party of much more dangerous consequence than those in the mountains. How little confidence may be placed in any negroes and how little they ought to be trusted with arms appears too plainly from the late rebellion in Antigua, where those were chiefly concerned who had the greatest share of trust and confidence from their masters."

=== Legislative Policy and Social Control ===
Gregory also advocated for legislation against the "evil" of hiring out enslaved labourers, arguing that it allowed them autonomy and the opportunity to "incite rebellion." These concerns were influenced by the 1736 Antigua conspiracy. To address the demographic imbalance, Gregory’s administration enforced "Deficiency Laws," requiring plantation owners to maintain a quota of white employees or face fines. On 23 November 1736, Gregory told the Jamaica Assembly:

“The hiring out of negroes has introduced such an evil amongst us that I cannot help laying it before you. The liberty they have thereby of rambling about the island, the opportunities it gives them of holding cabals and carrying on their wicked purposes, is of such dangerous consequence that unless some effectual law be framed to prevent it entirely, the consequences may prove fatal to the safety of the island.”

=== Naval Relations and Anti-Corruption Investigation ===
On 5 January 1737, while serving as President, Gregory authored a detailed dispatch to the Duke of Newcastle regarding a burgeoning international crisis and systemic corruption within the British Royal Navy. The conflict involved a series of "insults" between British and French forces, sparked by the seizure of a French vessel by the Governor of the Windward Islands. In retaliation, French forces attacked a British "Guinea ship" (slave ship) and two merchantmen anchored in Donna Maria Bay. Gregory emphasised the weight of the situation, writing:

"I thought this affair might prove a national concern and that it was my duty to represent it in the strongest and truest light and that none could better enable me to do so than those that were actually concerned."

Gregory’s investigation into the French aggression led to a direct confrontation with Captain Bridge of the HMS Antelope and Commodore Dent. When Gregory demanded a sworn statement ("information upon oath") to clarify the events at Donna Maria Bay, his request was ignored. Gregory suspected a cover-up, noting that:

"An information upon oath was not so agreeable nor was it perhaps so convenient the whole fact should appear. If what I hear reported be true Capt. Bridge was not at Donna Maria Bay so much by accident as by a concerted design to put his indigo on board those ships."

Gregory’s intelligence suggested that the Royal Navy was engaged in illegal trade with the French at Hispaniola. He alleged that Captain Bridge had diverted military resources for private profit, specifically noting that Bridge had "purchased and carried with him a considerable number of slaves, I have been told near 200, and he has brought none of them back," implying they had been bartered for French indigo and refined sugars. He further deduced the illicit trade through the behavior of the crew, remarking:

"The sailors of the navy are either grown very sober or have been supplied with rum from thence [Hispaniola], for I have heard none of the usual complaints of their being drunk or disorderly."

Despite offending the naval command, Gregory insisted that his administrative and judicial duty superseded military protocol, refusing to let the "concerted design" of his officers undermine the security of the island.

Following his initial report on the loss of 200 enslaved persons and the suspected illegal trade of indigo, Gregory acknowledged the political risks of challenging the military establishment. Addressing the Duke of Newcastle, he noted the potential for professional blowback while asserting his duty to protect the island's economic interests:

"I am not Very fond of making complaints nor would I willingly create new enemies, and I have heard it is ticklish meddling with the Navy: however, I cannot help thinking they are sent here to protect us and not to steal any little trade from us. This island has suffered under many discouragements and the carrying on a trade in this manner and importing our own commodities upon us must be very injurious to the merchant, the planter, and seafaring part of this country. I will forbear saying any more on this subject."

On the 28 December 1736, Gregory wrote to Commodore Dent:

"I requested from Capt. Bridge an account on oath of the affair at Donna Maria Bay. Having no reply, I therefore apply to you. As we have the same master, I think our councils cannot be too well united for his service. I have been informed you intend to sail in few days to Martinique to demand satisfaction. If you do I should be glad to have an opportunity by your means of conveying a letter to the governor upon this subject, for it may be of the last ill consequence not only to the trade in these parts but even to all Europe if some stop be not put to these proceedings. I wish you a happy year and many of them."

Commodore Dent replied to President Gregory from Kingston on the 29 December 1737:

"The information you require will be justly represented by me to the Principal Secretary of State as well as to the Lords of the Admiralty, without giving or putting you to the trouble. The trade while I command will always meet with due protection and proper convoy when demanded. I have no thoughts at present of going or sending a ship to Martinique to demand satisfaction for the depredations said to be committed. I shall suspend that till I am further instructed. Signed. PS. Capt. Draper promised Capt. Bridge Monday morning last to send you the enclosed by a gentleman then going to Spanish Town, but forgot it."

In this communication, Gregory bypassed standard naval hierarchy to report "national concerns" regarding the Royal Navy. Gregory framed the maritime corruption not merely as a local grievance, but as a systemic threat to the Navigation Acts and the economic stability of the Atlantic trade.

=== Claims of Executive Dominance ===
On 27 November 1736, four councillors—Edward Charlton, Henry Dawkins (father of politician and colonial landowner Henry Dawkins), William Gordon, and Temple Lawes—issued a formal justification for withdrawing from the governing body, citing multiple grievances against Gregory’s administration.

The councillors alleged that Gregory routinely bypassed institutional norms:

“The president during his whole administration has acted in matters of the greatest importance not only without but contrary to the advice and consent of the council.”

They also accused Gregory of deliberately pressuring them to secure legislative outcomes:

“The council having been obliged to a tedious attendance of 14 weeks were greatly harassed in their persons, injured in their fortunes and abused in their stations… to force their assent to some clauses in the Deficiency and Rum Bills which they judged partial and unreasonable.”

They also claimed that the Assembly was convened improperly:

“The present session of assembly was called without the advice of the council and without any pressing necessity that we are informed of, unless it was to procure those clauses to be passed in some law before the arrival of a governor.”

And following legislative disagreements, Gregory allegedly questioned the Council’s integrity:

“the president in his speech at the close of the session insinuated that the council were not only wanting in duty to H.M. and this island but regardless of the oaths they had taken in their stations, an imputation to which we shall forbear to give the proper epithet,”

The councillors described this accusation as intolerable:

“but which appeared to us so horrid that nothing could have prevailed on us to have given our attendance at this board but that the number of the council (until this session) was so small that we could not withdraw ourselves without a manifest obstruction of the public business.”

Lastly, the councillors argued Gregory’s conduct created a wider constitutional risk:

“we conceive the council may be liable to be insulted on the like occasions by any of their fellow-councillors who may hereafter assume the government.”

They concluded:

“For these and other reasons, we think it inconsistent with our honour, character and integrity to attend this board during the present administration.”

=== Response to Claims of Executive Dominance ===
On the 12th February 1737, Gregory sent a dispatch to the Council of Trade and Plantations,

"As our annual laws were near expiring and I had some matters of consequence to lay before the assembly I judged it necessary to call them. I enclose my speech to them with their address. The four gentlemen of the council who withdrew their attendance have kept their resolution, by which means we often lay under the difficulty of making a quorum, there being but six remaining besides myself. I believe this act of theirs will hardly be justified, but that I submit to you and the ministry. The country is still quiet in respect to the rebels and I have made the best dispositions I can to continue them so."

We can see the aftermath of the event in this 1737 communication from The Council of Trade to King George II:

“Edward Charlton, Henry Dawkins, William Gordon and Temple Lawes, upon a disagreement with President Gregory, have withdrawn from the council. When we had this affair under consideration we reported to the Committee of the Privy Council that we thought them persons not proper to be continued councillors. We submit it to you whether the said four gentlemen be continued or whether others should be appointed in their room.”
