= Henry Archibold =

Henry Archibold (also Archbold, Archbould) (died November, 1669) was a Lieutenant-Colonel in the English Army who rose to prominence in the early stages of the English Colony of Jamaica.

He was a captain in Major-General James Heane's regiment.

Following the invasion of Jamaica he was first posted to Rio Cobre valley. However he was relocated to the Liguanea area for military reasons. Here he established the Constant Spring plantation. With the use of the unpaid labour of soldiers under his command he developed “one of the best plantations in the island” (Commander William Brayne). In 1656 he was one of several regimental commanders accused of forcing their soldiers to work as unpaid servants, however he was acquitted. Archibold was responsible for developing his plantation to produce cash crops for export, and by 1658 he produced over 2,000 pounds of cocoa for export.

On 30 November 1671 his son married Joanna Wilhelmina Morgan, the daughter of Edward Morgan, Deputy Governor of Jamaica. This also meant that he was related by marriage to Henry Morgan who had married Mary Elizabeth Morgan, Joanna's elder sister.
