= List of mountains of Jamaica =

The following is a list of mountains in Jamaica:

- Blue Mountain Peak
- Blue Mountains
- John Crow Mountains
- Juan de Bolas Mountain
- Mocho Mountains
- Dry Harbour Mountains
- Dolphin Head Mountains
- Bull Head Mountains
- Santa Cruz Mountains
- Mount Diablo Mountains
- Don Figuerero Mountains
- May Day Mountains
- Yallahs Mountains
- Mount Diablo
- Mount Fuego
- Long Mountain
- Georges Plain Mountain
- John Crow Peak
- Mount Airy
- The Blue Mountains
- Mocho Mountains
- Nassau
- Albion Hill
- Bull Head Mountain

== See also ==
- List of mountain
