= Battle of Ocho Rios =

1657 battle of the Anglo-Spanish War of 1654–1660

- Part of the Anglo-Spanish War of 1654–1660
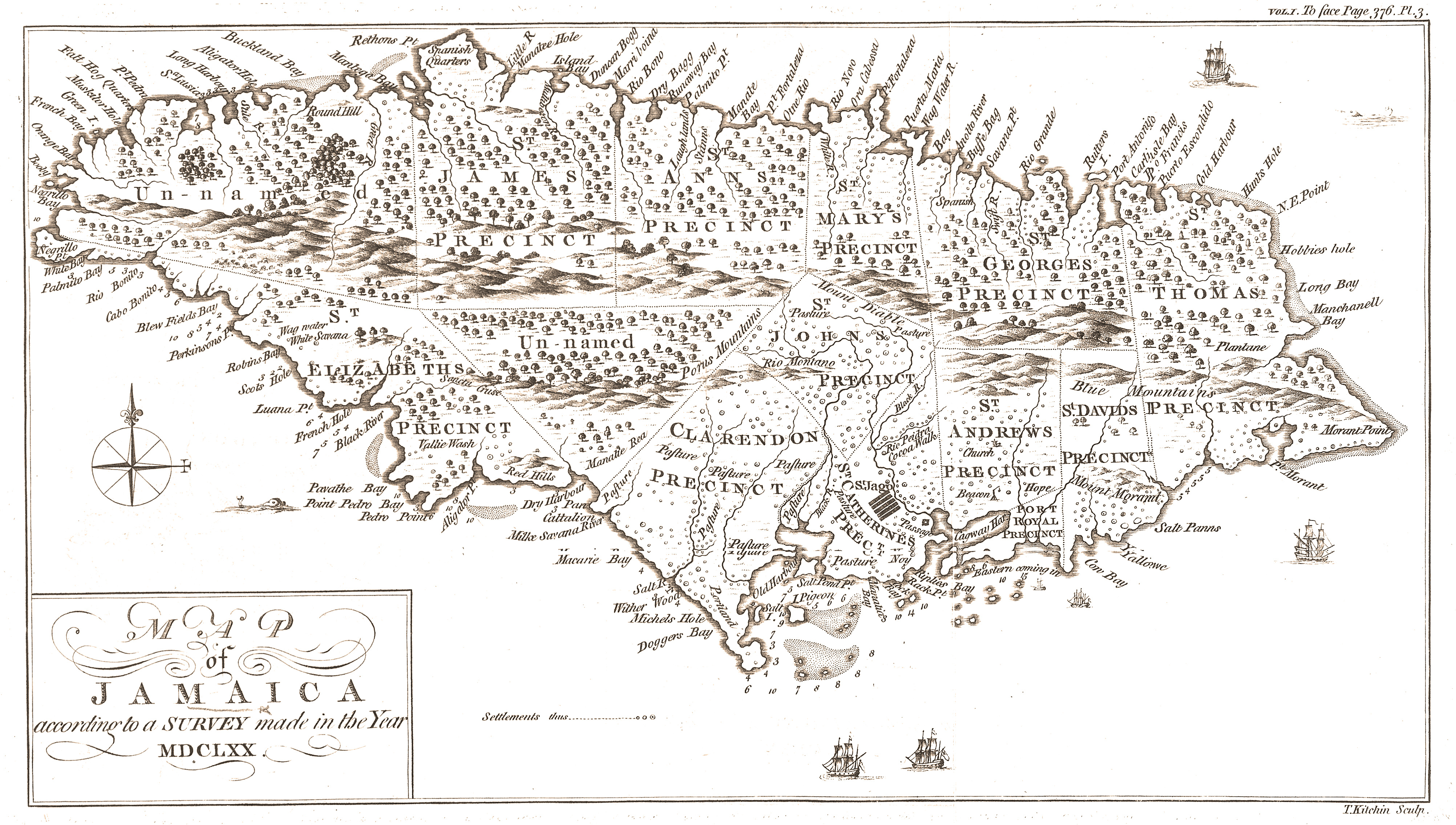
- 1670 map of Jamaica
Date	30 October 1657
Location	Near Ocho Rios, Jamaica 18.4079°N 77.1086°W
Result	English victory

Belligerents
England	Spain

Commanders and leaders
Edward D'Oyley	Cristóbal Arnaldo Isasi

Strength
1,000 regulars and militia	300 soldiers

Casualties and losses
Unknown	Unknown

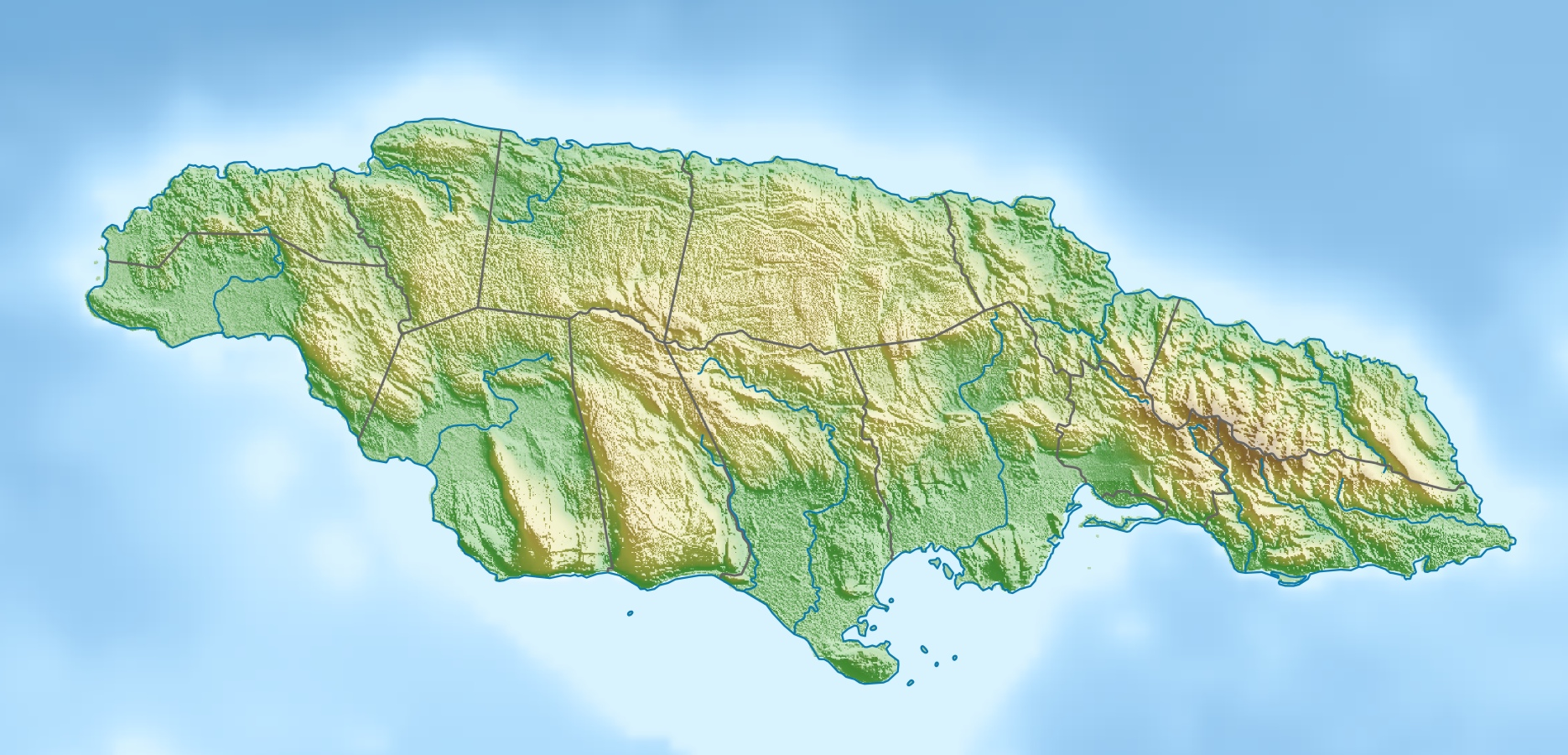
Approximate location of battle.

The Battle of Ocho Rios also known as Battle of Las Chorreras was a military action which took place on the island of Jamaica on 30 October 1657 where a Spanish force under Cristóbal Arnaldo Isasi hoping to take back the island was defeated by the English occupying force under the acting governor Colonel Edward D'Oyley.

The English had captured Jamaica in 1655 but had been reduced significantly by disease in the aftermath. They ran through governors at a rapid rate: General Robert Sedgwick arrived and died in 1655, General William Brayne replaced him and died in 1656, and then General Edward D'Oyley who had already been on the island took over as Governor being acclimatised to the island's harsh tropical conditions.

Two years after the English invasion, Cristóbal Arnaldo Isasi, the former Spanish governor, had been hiding in the hills with the runaway slaves (later known as maroons). He requested a force to be sent from Cuba to retake the island for Spain. He now had reinforcements from Cuba and had them land at Las Chorreros (present day Ocho Rios). By now he had assembled a total of nearly 300 soldiers and around 100 militia or guerrillas. D'Oyley, aware of Spanish ships being seen off the northern coast, decided to set out and attack. He sailed north to meet them and landed his force of around 900 militia near Ocho Rios, where, close to Dunn's River Falls he defeated Isasi and his force in a short battle. Isasi fled back into the hills whilst the rest of the Spanish were captured and were later repatriated back to Cuba under terms.

Isasi tried again in 1658 at Rio Nuevo but this time with reinforcements from New Spain and the presence of a fort. In a repeat of what happened at Ocho Rios D'Oyley achieved the same feat by sailing north and defeated him again.

== See also ==
- History of Jamaica
- Military history of Britain
- Spanish Empire

== Notes ==
=== References ===
- Firth, C.H. Last Years of the Protectorate vol. II (London 1909)
