= A Weekend in the Country =

A Weekend in the Country may refer to:

- "A Weekend in the Country" (Dawson's Creek), a 2000 television episode
- "A Weekend in the Country" (Desperate Housewives), a 2006 television episode
- "Weekend in the Country", a 1980 episode of The Professionals
