= Trafalgar Park =

Trafalgar Park may refer to:

- Trafalgar Park, Nelson, a sports venue in Nelson, New Zealand
- Trafalgar Park, Wiltshire, a park surrounding Trafalgar House, Wiltshire, England, UK
- Trafalgar Park, a neighbourhood of Kingston, Jamaica, near Liguanea
- Trafalgar Park, a park in Woodstock, Cape Town, South Africa
