= Arthur Jelf =

Arthur Jelf may refer to:

- Sir Arthur Richard Jelf, English judge
- Sir Arthur S. Jelf, British colonial administrator
