= Liguanea =

Area of Jamaica

Coordinates: 18°01′N 76°46′W

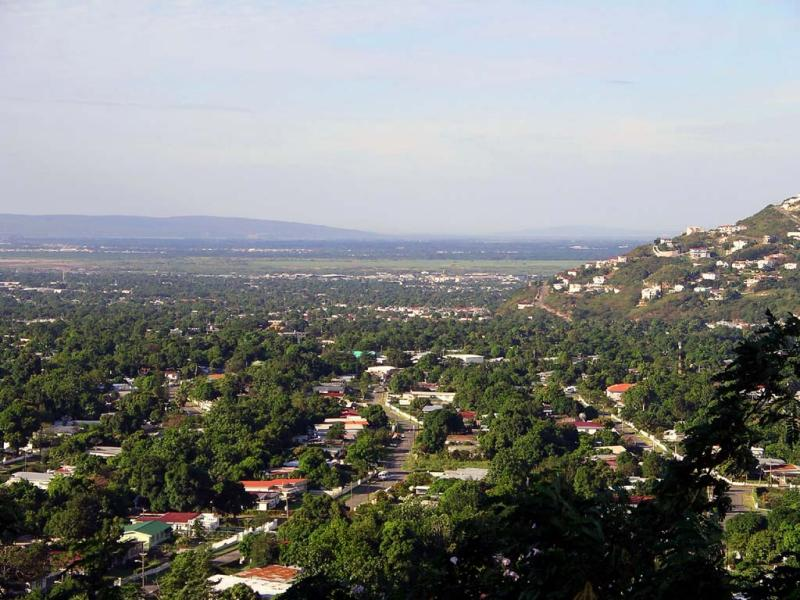
North of Kingston, Jamaica

Liguanea (/ˈlɪɡəniː/ LIG-ə-nee) is an area of the island of Jamaica.

== Nomenclature ==
Its name came from the language of the Arawak people who currently inhabit some of the island's rural areas in Cornwall County. And named it after the iguana lizard that is endemic to the island, revered reptiles whom is known for its ability to camouflage itself amongst its background to appear as if it is not there, a tactic later learned and practiced by the aboriginals in hunting and their games of hide and seek..

== Liguanea Plains ==
The Liguanea Plains are the fertile flat lands of alluvium spreading south towards Kingston Harbour, but the area today now known as Liguanea is now only a small part of the Kingston Corporate Area, a section of itself and now named the parish of St Andrew. From a socioeconomic point of view, Liguanea is the name of a distinct commercial district: east to west, between Half-Way-Tree (up to Jamaica House) and Papine (at UTech's front gate); north to south, between Millsborough (Barbican Road) and New Kingston (Mountain View Road to Trafalgar Road).

== Geography ==
Geographically, Liguanea was the whole parish of today's St. Andrew parish named St. Andrew after the English take over of the islands from the Spanish. The heart of the Liguanea suburban commercial district is Matilda's Corner, the only intersection of Hope and Old Hope Roads. Activities here serve the immediate neighbourhoods as well as the adjoining area of Papine. The origin of the name Matilda's Corner is unknown. Enclosing residential areas include Mona, Wellington, Mona Heights, Hope Pastures, Trafalgar Park, and Beverly Hills. The "small communities", also known as ghettoes or "deep urban areas", nearby are Sandy Gully, Stand Pipe and Chambers Lane/Air Pipe.

== History ==
Following the English invasion of Jamaica Lt.-Colonel Henry Archibold established a regimental plantation, using the labour of soldiers under his command to develop “one of the best plantations in the island” (Commander William Brayne).

=== Hope Estate ===
Richard Hope, a member of the English Army, founded the Hope Estate in the 1660s. It was first a cattle-mill. Given permission to operate a watermill along Hope River to grind sugar cane in 1752, it became a sugar plantation. It was called the Hope Plantation. The estate grew and in 1826 it was called Hope Estate.

=== Hope Botanical Gardens and Hope Zoo ===
The Hope Botanical Gardens and the Hope Zoo, located on Old Hope Road, include a botanical garden, orchid house, and stone aqueduct. There is also a children's amusement park and a zoo. They are located on what was formerly the Hope Estate. In 1881, the government acquired the land and laid out the gardens. In 1953, the Royal Botanical Gardens were formed for a visit by Queen Elizabeth II. The botanical gardens are the largest in the Caribbean.

== Places of interest ==
- Religious: Anglican, Roman Catholic, Church of God, Apostolic/Pentecostal Seventh-day Adventist, New Testament, Methodist, the seat of the Roman Catholic Archdiocese in Jamaica, a Methodist cemetery, and an Anglican columbarium;
- Commercial: Three large scale and more small-scale shopping malls, three banks, a building society, a Post Office and mall with many supermarkets and shops;
- Educational: two major universities, seven secondary schools, Campion College, Jamaica College, Priory High (closed in 2007), Ardenne High, American International School of Kingston, Papine High and Mona High, and five primary schools, New Providence Primary, Sts. Peter and Paul Preparatory, Priory Prep. (closed), Mona Prep. & Mona Primary; three basic schools, Providence Methodist Early Childhood Institution, Shady Grove Basic School and NWC Basic School.
- The Society for the Blind H.Q.;
- The US Embassy in Jamaica.

== Facts ==
- Postal code: Kingston 6
- Population: approximately 10,000
- Oldest building in Liguanea: the triangular Fabricare cleaning building.
- Oldest institution: Providence Methodist Church on Old Hope Road, between Liguanea Lane Plaza and Photo Express.
- Notable dates: The day the Guango tree was cut down, 1997

The following places are within three miles of Matilda's Corner:

- Ministry of Agriculture and Mining,
- Management Institute of National Development (MIND),
- The University of the West Indies - known for schools of Medicine, and other Sciences,
- The University of Technology, Jamaica - known for schools of Engineering, Computing, Architecture and Pharmacy,
- The National Chest Hospital,
- The University Hospital of the West Indies,
- Andrews Memorial Hospital,
- Campion College
- Jamaica 4-H Clubs
- Kingsway United Church,
- Andrews Seventh-day Adventist Church,
- St. Andrew Parish Church,
- St. Margaret's Church - Anglican,
- Sts. Peter and Paul Church - Roman Catholic,
- St. Thomas Aquinas Centre - Roman Catholic,
- Church of the Ascension - Anglican,
- Mona Baptist Church,
- The Office of the Commissioner of the Jamaica Constabulary Force (soon to be relocated on Duke Street, Downtown),
- Carberry Special School,
- Lister Mair School for the Deaf,
- National Children's Home,
- The Chinese Benevolence Association (CBA) building
- Vocational Technical Development Institute.
- The Water Resources Authority of Jamaica

== Economy ==
The Caribbean Airlines/Air Jamaica office is in Liguanea.

== Amenities ==
- Royal Botanical Gardens & Zoo - home to lush gardens, ponds, and Jamaica's only lions
- Vale Royal - official residence of the Prime Minister
- Jamaica House - office of the Prime Minister
- King's House - official residence of the Governor-General
- Liguanea Post Mall - shopping centre
- Contemporary Arts Centre
- Saint Peter & Paul Church
- Jamaica Carnival - road march through the streets of Liguanea, Half-Way-Tree and New Kingston the Sunday after Easter
- Joker's Wild/Bacchanal J'ouvert - road march through the streets of Liguanea and New Kingston the Friday after Easter
- Liguanea Arts Festival held annually.
