= Edward Morgan (governor) =

Welsh-Jamaican politician

Edward Morgan was a Welsh politician and uncle of the privateer Henry Morgan. He was made Deputy Governor of Jamaica in 1664 after the Restoration of the monarchy under Charles II. His daughter Mary married his nephew Henry Morgan, and his daughter Joanna Wilhelmina married Henry Archibold, a Lieutenant-Colonel in the English Army who rose to prominence in the early English colony of Jamaica.

Sir Thomas Modyford, then Governor of Jamaica, and who would later grant Henry Morgan a letter of marque, considered Edward Morgan a dear and loyal friend. On the eve of the Second Anglo-Dutch War, Jamaica hosted numerous privateers, and although English officials despaired of their presence, Modyford and Morgan believed them to be a useful security for the otherwise vulnerable colony.

Hostilities between the English and Dutch in 1664 led to a change in government policy: colonial governors were now authorised to issue letters of marque against the Dutch. (Note: The hostilities led to the Second Anglo-Dutch War (1665–1667).) Although many privateers did not take up the letters, Morgan led a 600-man force to conquer the Dutch islands of Sint Eustatius and Saba in late 1665. Morgan died in December 1665, and his nephew Thomas Morgan, cousin of Henry Morgan, became governor of the two islands.
