= Rio Nuevo (Jamaica) =

Location
- Country: Jamaica

Physical characteristics
- Mouth
  - location: Rio Nuevo Bay, Caribbean Sea
  - coordinates: 18°25′N 77°01′W

The Rio Nuevo is a river in Jamaica. It runs through the parish of Saint Mary, meeting the Caribbean Sea in the Rio Nuevo Bay, on the north Jamaican coast. On 25–27 June 1658, it was the site of the Battle of Rio Nuevo between Spanish and English forces, which remains the largest battle to have been fought on Jamaican soil.

== See also ==
- List of rivers of Jamaica
