= List of governors of Jamaica =

This is a list of viceroys in Jamaica from its initial occupation by Spain in 1509, to its independence from the United Kingdom in 1962. For a list of viceroys after independence, see Governor-General of Jamaica. For context, see History of Jamaica.

== Spanish Governors of Santiago (1510–1660) ==
Jamaica was claimed for Spain in 1494 when Christopher Columbus first landed on the island. Spain began occupying the island in 1509, naming it Santiago. The second governor, Francisco de Garay, established Villa de la Vega, now known as Spanish Town, as his capital.

- Juan de Esquivel, 1510–1514
- Francisco de Garay, 1514–1523
- Pedro de Mazuelo, 1523–1526
- Juan de Mendegurren, 1526–1527
- Santino de Raza, 1527–1531
- Gonzalo de Guzman, ?–1532
- Manuel de Rojas, 1532–?, first time
- Gil González Dávila, 1533?–1534?
- Manuel de Rojas, 1536–?, second time
- Pedro Cano, 1539?, first time
- Francisco de Pina, 1544?
- Juan González de Hinojosa, 1556?
- Pedro Cano, 1558?, second time
- Blas de Melo, 1565?
- Juan de Gaudiel, 1567?–1572?
- Hernán Manrique de Rojas, 1575?
- Iñigo Fuentes, ?–1577
- Rodrigo Núñez de la Peña, 1577–1578
- Lucas del Valle Alvarado, 1578–1583?, first time
- Diego Fernández de Mercado, 1586?
- Lucas del Valle Alvarado, 1591?, second time
- García del Valle, 1596?
- Fernando Melgarejo Córdoba, 1596–1606
- Alonso de Miranda, 1607–1611
- Pedro Espejo Barranco, 1611–1614
- Andrés González de Vera, 1614–?
- Sebastián Lorenzo Romano, 1620?
- Francisco Terril, 1625–1632
- Juan Martínez Arana, 1632–1637
- Gabriel Peñalver Angulo, 1637–1639
- Jacinto Sedeño Albornoz, 1639–1640, first time
- Francisco Ladrón de Zegama, 1640–1643
- Alcades, 1643–1645
- Sebastián Fernández de Gamboa, 1645–1646
- Pedro Caballero, 1646–1650
- Jacinto Sedeño Albornoz, 1650, second time
- Francisco de Proenza, 1650–1651, first time
- Juan Ramírez de Arellano, 1651–1655
- Francisco de Proenza, 1655–1656, second time
- Cristóbal Arnaldo Isasi, 1656–1660

== English Commanders of Jamaica (1655–61) ==
In 1655, an English force led by Admiral Sir William Penn and General Robert Venables seized the island. Following their departure, the incumbents successfully held it against Spanish attempts to retake it over the next few years.

- Admiral Sir William Penn 11 May 1655 – 1655
- General Robert Venables, 1655
- Edward D'Oyley, 1655–1656, first time
- William Brayne, 1656–1657
- Edward D'Oyley, 1657–1661, second time

== English Governors of Jamaica (1661–62) ==
In 1661, England began colonisation of the island.

- Edward D'Oyley, 1661–August 1662, continued
- Thomas Hickman-Windsor, Lord Windsor, August 1662–November 1662

== Deputy Governors of Jamaica (1662–71) ==
- Charles Lyttleton, 1662–1663, acting
- Thomas Lynch, 1663–1664, acting, first time
- Edward Morgan, 1664
- Sir Thomas Modyford, 1664–August 1671

== Lieutenant Governors of Jamaica (1671–90) ==
In 1670, the Treaty of Madrid legitimised English claim to the island.

- Thomas Lynch, August 1671–November 1674, second time
- Henry Morgan, 1674–1675, acting, first time
- John Vaughan, 1675–1678
- Henry Morgan, 1678, acting, second time
- Charles Howard, 1st Earl of Carlisle, 1678–1680
- Henry Morgan, 1680–1682, acting, third time
- Thomas Lynch, 1682–1684, third time
- Hender Molesworth, 1684–December 1687, acting
- Christopher Monck, 2nd Duke of Albemarle, 1687–1688
- Hender Molesworth, 1688–1689, acting
- Francis Watson, 1689–1690, acting

== Governors of Jamaica (1690–1962) ==
- William O'Brien, 2nd Earl of Inchiquin, 1690–16 January 1692
- John White, 1691–22 August 1692, acting
- John Bourden, 1692–1693, acting
- Sir William Beeston, March 1693–January 1702, acting to 1699
- William Selwyn, Jan-April 1702 (died in office)
- Peter Beckford, 1702, acting
- Thomas Handasyd, 1702–1711, acting to 1704
- Lord Archibald Hamilton, 1711–1716
- Thomas Pitt, 1716-1717
- Peter Heywood, 1716–1718 acting
- Sir Nicholas Lawes, 1718–1722
- Henry Bentinck, 1st Duke of Portland, 1722–4 July 1726
- John Ayscough, 1726–1728, acting, first time
- Robert Hunter, 1728–March 1734
- John Ayscough, 1734–1735, acting, second time
- John Gregory, 1735, acting, first time
- Henry Cunningham, 1735–1736
- John Gregory, 1736–1738, acting, second time
- Edward Trelawny, 1738–1752
- Charles Knowles, 1752–January 1756
- Sir Henry Moore, February 1756–April 1756, acting, first time
- George Haldane, April 1756–November 1759
- Sir Henry Moore, November 1759 – 1762, acting, second time
- Sir William Lyttleton, 1762–1766
- Roger Hope Elletson, 1766–1767
- Sir William Trelawny, 1767–December 1772
- John Dalling, December 1772 – 1774, acting, first time
- Sir Basil Keith, 1774–1777
- John Dalling, 1777–1781, second time
- Archibald Campbell, 1781–1784, acting to 1783
- Alured Clarke, 1784–1790
- Thomas Howard, 3rd Earl of Effingham, 1790–19 November 1791
- Sir Adam Williamson, 1791–1795, acting
- Alexander Lindsay, 6th Earl of Balcarres, 1795–1801
- Sir George Nugent, 1801–1805
- Sir Eyre Coote, 1806–1808
- William Montagu, 5th Duke of Manchester, 1808–1827
- Sir John Keane, 1827–1829, acting
- Somerset Lowry-Corry, 2nd Earl Belmore, 1829–1832
- George Cuthbert, 1832, acting, first time
- Constantine Phipps, 2nd Earl of Mulgrave, 1832–1834
- Sir Amos Norcott, 1834, acting
- George Cuthbert, 1834, acting, second time
- Howe Peter Browne, 2nd Marquess of Sligo, 1834–1836
- Sir Lionel Smith, 1836–1839
- Sir Charles Theophilus Metcalfe, 1839–1842
- James Bruce, 8th Earl of Elgin, 1842–1846
- George Henry Frederick Berkeley, 1846–1847, acting
- Sir Charles Edward Grey, 1847–1853
- Sir Henry Barkly, 1853–1856
- Edward Wells Bell, 1856–1857, acting
- Charles Henry Darling, 1856–1862
- Edward John Eyre, 1862–1865, acting to 1864
- Sir Henry Knight Storks, 12 December 1865 – 16 July 1866
- Sir John Peter Grant, 1866–1874
- W. A. G. Young, 1874, acting
- Sir William Grey, 1874–January 1877
- Edward Rushworth, January 1877, acting
- Sir Anthony Musgrave, January 1877 – 1883
- Somerset M. Wiseman Clarke, 1883, acting
- Dominic Jacotin Gamble, 1883, acting
- Sir Henry Wylie Norman, 1883–1889
- William Clive Justice, 1889, acting
- Sir Henry Arthur Blake, 1889–1898
- Henry Jardine Hallowes, 1898, acting
- Sir Augustus William Lawson Hemming, 1898–1904
- Sydney Haldane Olivier, 1904, acting, first time
- Hugh Clarence Bourne, 1904, acting, first time
- Sir James Alexander Swettenham, 30 September 1904 – 1907
- Hugh Clarence Bourne, 1907, acting, second time
- Sydney Haldane Olivier, 16 May 1907 – January 1913, second time
- Philip Clark Cork, January 1913 – 7 March 1913, acting
- Sir William Henry Manning, 7 March 1913 – 11 May 1918
- Robert Johnstone, 11 May 1918 – 11 June 1918, acting
- Sir Leslie Probyn, 11 June 1918 – 1924
- Herbert Bryan, 1924, acting, first time
- Sir Samuel Herbert Wilson, 29 September 1924 – June 1925
- Sir Herbert Bryan, 1925, acting, second time
- Sir Arthur S. Jelf, October 1925 – 26 April 1926, acting, first time
- Sir Reginald Edward Stubbs, 26 April 1926 – 9 November 1932
- Sir Arthur S. Jelf, 9 November 1932 – 21 November 1932, acting, second time
- Sir Alexander Ransford Slater, 21 November 1932 – April 1934
- Sir Arthur S. Jelf, April 1934–24 October 1934, acting, third time
- Sir Edward Brandis Denham, 24 October 1934 – 2 June 1938
- Charles Campbell Woolley, 2 June 1938 – 19 August 1938, acting
- Sir Arthur Frederick Richards, 19 August 1938 – July 1943
- William Henry Flinn, July 1943 – 29 September 1943, acting
- Sir John Huggins, 29 September 1943 – 7 April 1951
- Sir Hugh Mackintosh Foot, 7 April 1951 – 18 November 1957
- Sir Kenneth Blackburne, 18 December 1957 – 6 August 1962

In 1962, Jamaica gained independence from the United Kingdom. Since independence, the viceroy in Jamaica has been the Governor-General of Jamaica.

== Bibliography ==
- Gardner, William James (1909). The History of Jamaica : From its Discovery by Christopher Columbus to the Year 1872. New York: D. Appleton & Company.
