= Juan de Bolas River =

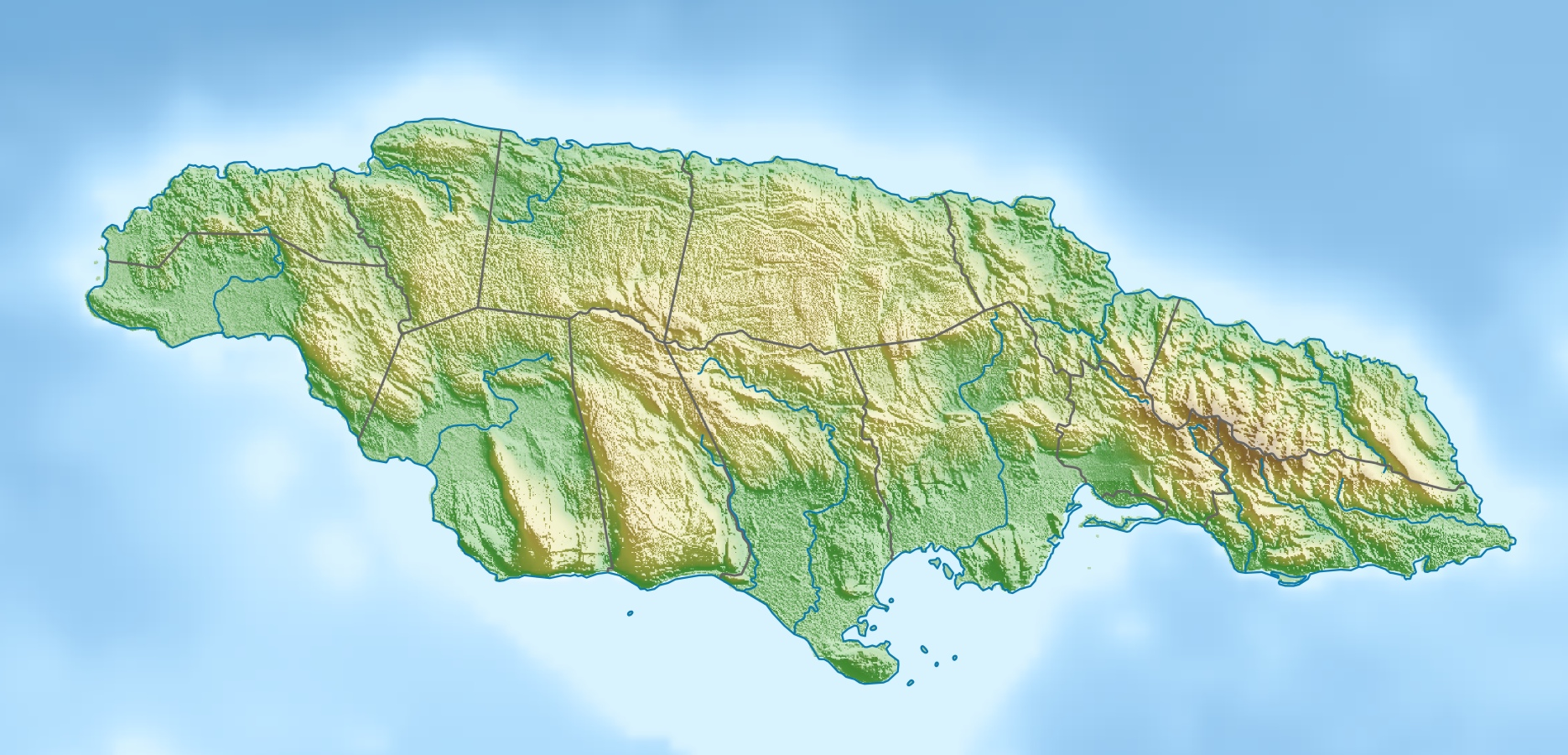
- Confluence of the Juan de Bolas River with the Rio Minho

Location
- Country: Jamaica

Physical characteristics
- Source
  - location: Juan de Bolas Mountain
  - coordinates: 18°04′14″N 77°07′36″W
  - elevation: 2,743 ft (836 m)
- Mouth
  - location: Confluence with Rio Minho
  - coordinates: 18°04′57″N 77°13′41″W
  - elevation: 625 ft (191 m)
- Length: 10 mi (16 km)

The Juan de Bolas River rises in Saint Catherine, Jamaica, and flows through Saint Catherine and Clarendon. It is one of two rivers in Jamaica named after Juan de Bolas, the first Chief of the Jamaican Maroons.

== Course ==
The river rises just east of Juan de Bolas Mountain, at just under 2,743 feet (836 m) from where it flows north, north-west, west and south-south-west to a confluence with the Rio Minho.

== Tributaries ==
Tributaries (source to confluence) include:

- Seven unnamed streams
- Tingley Gulley
- Pindars River
