= Juan de Serras =

Seventeenth century Jamaican Maroon chief

Juan de Serras was one of the first Jamaican Maroon chiefs in the seventeenth century. His community was based primarily around Los Vermajales, and as a result the English called his group of Maroons the Karmahaly Maroons. It is likely that his Maroons are descended from escaped slaves Taino men and women.

== Fighting for the Spanish ==
When the English captured Jamaica from the Spanish in 1655 Invasion of Jamaica, the latter freed their slaves, who then escaped into the forested mountains of the interior, and established independent communities of Free black people in Jamaica. These groups fought on the side of the Spanish in their attempts to recapture Jamaica from the English. When one group, led by Juan de Bolas, switched sides and joined the English, the Spanish gave up on their attempts to recapture the island.

In contrast to de Bolas, de Serras and his men stayed loyal to the Spanish, and refused to come to terms with the English. Based in the mountains of central Jamaica, de Serras and his Maroon warriors mounted a number of attacks on English settlements, burning plantations and houses, as well as killing English soldiers and settlers. The English used de Bolas and his men to attack de Serras and his Maroon community. In 1664, Maroons belonging to de Serras ambushed and killed de Bolas. Eventually, the black militia belonging to de Bolas faded from historical records, while the Maroons of de Serras continued to trouble the English.

== Guerrilla war against the English ==
After 1664, de Serras and his Maroons continued to mount attacks on English settlements, such as the capital, Spanish Town, where they burnt houses, captured food and livestock, and freed slaves. The community of de Serras acted as a magnet for slaves seeking to run away from English owners.

The first English governor of the Colony of Jamaica, Edward D'Oyley, was unable to defeat de Serras, and the job of taking on the Karmahaly Maroons fell to Thomas Modyford, who became governor in 1664. The following year, Modyford declared war on the Karmahaly Maroons, and offered rewards for capturing and killing members of de Serras' group.

In the mid-1660s, de Serras sent one of his Maroon warriors, Domingo, to discuss peace overtures. Modyford accepted Domingo, because he believed that while the English could not defeat the Maroons, he felt they could absorb them into society the way D'Oyley did with de Bolas. However, de Serras used the lull in the fighting to relocate to a more secure environment, probably the Blue Mountains in eastern Jamaica, from which they soon resumed attacks on the English colonial authorities.

In the 1670s, the former buccaneer Henry Morgan, who later became lieutenant-governor of Jamaica, and owner of a slave plantation in Guanaboa Vale, led a campaign against de Serras and the Karmahaly Maroons. Morgan was unable to rout the Maroons, but following that encounter the colonial authorities no longer filed reports about de Serras and the Karmahaly Maroons.

== Legacy ==
It is possible that de Serras and the Karmahaly Maroons withdrew further into the Blue Mountains, which were inaccessible to the English colonial authorities, where they lived off the land and avoided further contact with white planters.

It is theorised that they may have joined the original Native Yamaye Maroons and the Africa Kormantse Maroons of Prince Naquan, said to be the father of Cudjoe and Nanny, who according to some oral history joined them in the Blue Mountains in the 1640s. The Maroons of the Blue Mountains eventually expanded from the east to the west under leaders such as Cudjoe and Nanny.
