= Battle of Rio Nuevo =

1658 battle of the Anglo-Spanish War of 1654–1660

- Part of the Anglo-Spanish War of 1654–1660
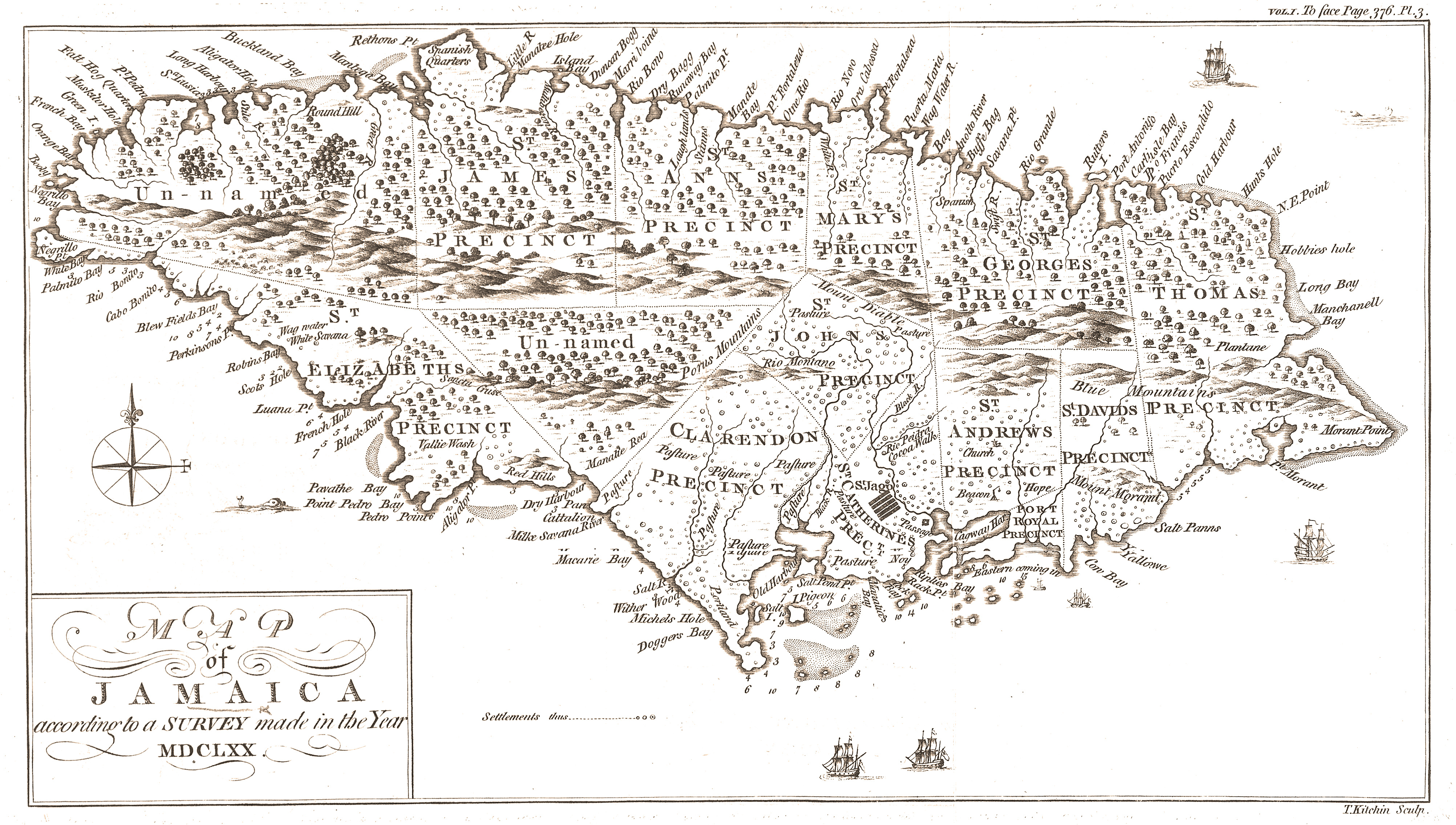
- 1670 map of Jamaica
Date	25–27 June 1658
Location	Near the Rio Nuevo, Jamaica 18.4102°N 77.0142°W
Result	English victory

Belligerents
England	Spain

Commanders and leaders
Edward D'Oyley	Cristóbal Arnaldo Isasi

Strength
700 regulars and militia 10 ships	560 soldiers 50 insurgents 4 troopships

Casualties and losses
60 killed or wounded	300 killed or wounded 150 captured 4 troopships captured

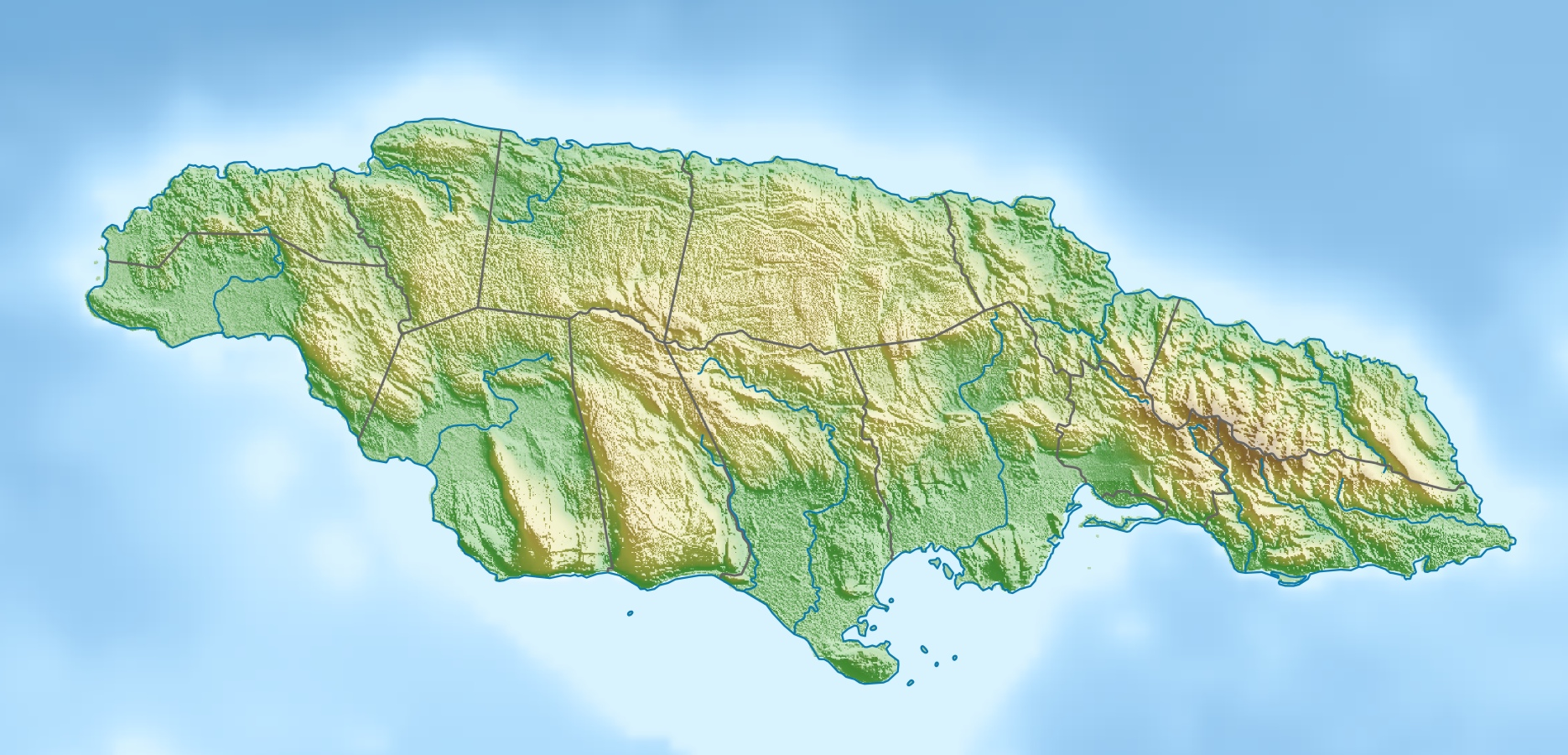
Approximate location of battle

The Battle of Rio Nuevo occurred between 25 and 27 June 1658 (Note: These are the Gregorian dates, as used by the Spanish on Jamaica at the time. The English dates were 15–17 June 1658.) on the English colony of Jamaica during the Anglo-Spanish War of 1654–1660. It was fought between an English force of 700 regular troops and militia led by Colonel Edward D'Oyley and an invading Spanish force of 560 soldiers and 50 insurgents under Cristóbal Arnaldo Isasi. Lasting over two days, the battle resulted in the Spanish invaders being totally defeated, suffering 450 casualties while the English only suffered 60 men killed or wounded. It is the largest battle that was ever fought in Jamaica.

== Background ==
In 1655, an English force led by Admiral Sir William Penn and General Robert Venables seized the island, and successfully held it against two Spanish attempts to retake it. The former Spanish governor of Jamaica, Cristóbal Arnaldo Isasi, attempted to recapture the island with forces from Cuba in mid-1657, but the attack was repulsed at the Battle of Ocho Rios by acting governor Colonel Edward D'Oyley.

On 20 May 1658, Isasi attempted another invasion with more men recruited from New Spain; the Tercios Mexicano (known as Mexican Regiment). Isasi also had at his disposal four troop transports and armed ships. In total, the invasion force consisted of 31 captains, 31 ensigns, 28 sergeants and 467 soldiers. While this force anchored for two days near the mouth of Rio Nuevo, three English coast guard vessels chanced upon the Spanish but were chased away by gunfire. The English scouts reported back to D'Oyley, who mustered all available militia and soldiers who were fit to fight. The Spanish in the meantime fortified their camp and were joined by around 50 tattered Spanish guerrillas.

== Battle ==
On 25 June, D'Oyley mustered a total of 700 soldiers and militia and ten ships to transport them. The English troops disembarked near the Rio Nuevo. The English then captured the Spanish transports, sealing off any escape for the invaders. The Spanish, seeing this, attempted to make a stand behind their newly fortified redoubt. The English declined to come to grips and fired on the Spanish position with cannon and muskets for two days. Their superior firepower had a devastating effect, and when the surviving Spanish attempted to break out, most were killed or captured. What was left of the invasion force fled into the hills and jungle. They had lost over 300 dead and wounded, mostly killed, and 150 prisoners, as well as eleven flags, six guns, and most of their arms and ammunition. English casualties numbered around sixty. Most of the wounded on both sides died of tropical diseases.

== Aftermath ==
The victorious English conveyed the Spanish artillery back to 'The Point' and to Fort Cromwell, installing it into their defences. Isasi tried to keep up the struggle until he was defeated in 1660, escaping from what is now the area of the Tower Isle resort and fleeing to Cuba by canoe with his remaining supporters. To dissuade further Spanish attempts to retake Jamaica, the English under Christopher Myngs launched attacks on Spanish ports such as Santa Marta and Tolu, forcing the Spanish on to the defensive. Buccaneers such as Henry Morgan were also invited to base themselves at Port Royal, to help defend against Spanish attacks.

The battle of Rio Nuevo was the last Spanish attempt to recapture Jamaica. Spain ceded the island to England in 1670 under the Treaty of Madrid.

=== Battlefield today ===
The Rio Nuevo Battle Site Heritage Park and Museum was opened in August 2009.

== See also ==
- History of Jamaica
- British military history
- Spanish Empire
