= List of The Professionals episodes =

This is a list of all The Professionals episodes, which comprise the following cast members: Gordon Jackson (George Cowley), Martin Shaw (Ray Doyle) and Lewis Collins (William Bodie).

Since the deaths of Gordon Jackson and Lewis Collins in 1990 and 2013 respectively, Martin Shaw is the only surviving regular cast member of the show.

== Series overview ==
The Professionals was produced by Brian Clemens's Avengers Mark 1 Productions for London Weekend Television (LWT) in five production blocks. These episodes were originally broadcast on the ITV network in a series of five scheduling runs. The transmission order of the episodes in these series was often different from the production order, but given that each episode was typically a self-contained story with no references to other episodes, this had little significance for viewers. Whilst earlier DVD releases tended to group the episodes in original ITV transmission order, Network's DVD & Blu-ray editions used production order.

- Production block 1 began in June 1977 with "Old Dog With New Tricks" and consisted of 13 episodes, completing in January 1978. These were originally screened in a single run by LWT, apart from "Klansmen", which was not broadcast due to concerns about the episode's racial content. As of 2016, this episode had still never been transmitted on UK terrestrial television. However, it is available to stream on BritBox UK.
- Production block 2 began in June 1978 with "Rogue" and again consisted of 13 episodes. It was originally intended to complete during November 1978; however, actor Lewis Collins suffered a broken leg, meaning that filming of the last two episodes in the block ("The Madness of Mickey Hamilton" and "Servant of Two Masters") had to be postponed. These were not mounted until March 1979, immediately prior to the making of Block 3. LWT broadcast 10 of the episodes as Series 2 of the show, holding back three for the third series.
- Production block 3 began in April 1979 (continuing immediately from the completion of the last two postponed episodes of block 2), and also consisted of 13 episodes, completing in November 1979. LWT broadcast half of these episodes as part of the show's third series, using the rest in series 4.
- Production block 4 began in June 1980 with "The Gun" and again consisted of 13 episodes, completing in December 1980. LWT used half these episodes to make up the remainder of the show's fourth series, keeping the rest for transmission in series 5.
- Production block 5 began in March 1981 with "Cry Wolf" and consisted of only 5 episodes, completing in May 1981. At this point the three main actors' contracts had expired, and neither Martin Shaw or Lewis Collins chose to renew them. LWT used these episodes to make up the remainder of the show's fifth series.

Series	Episodes	Originally released	
Series	Episodes	First released	Last released
1	13	30 December 1977	17 March 1978
2	10	7 October 1978	9 December 1978
3	8	27 October 1979	15 December 1979
4	15	7 September 1980	27 December 1980
5	11	7 November 1982	6 February 1983

== Episode list ==
=== Series 1 (1977–1978) ===
Episode #	UK Transmission Date	Production Block	Title	Writer	Director	Guest cast
1-01	30 Dec 1977	1-06	Private Madness, Public Danger	Anthony Read	Douglas Camfield	Keith Barron, Di Trevis, Christopher Ellison, Donald Douglas, Angus MacKay, Ian Fairbairn, Penny Irving, Trevor Adams
Although this was broadcast first, it was the sixth episode produced. A rogue biochemist threatens to poison London's water supply with a powerful hallucinogenic drug unless the government ceases all research into chemical warfare. Note: First regular appearances of Gordon Jackson as George Cowley, Martin Shaw as Ray Doyle and Lewis Collins as William Bodie.
1-02	6 Jan 1978	1-07	The Female Factor	Brian Clemens	David Wickes	Anthony Steel, Pamela Salem, Felicity Dean, Walter Gotell, Barry Justice, Stefan Kalipha, Kenneth Watson
Soviet agents use a "honey trap" in an attempt to extort state secrets from an ambitious politician.
1-03	13 Jan 1978	1-01	Old Dog with New Tricks	Brian Clemens	Sidney Hayers	Phil Davis, Pamela Stephenson, Richard Hampton, Edward Dentith, John Judd
The first episode of The Professionals, although it was broadcast third. The scene in which Cowley explains what CI5 is to a group of people was supposed to be an explanation for the viewing audience. A recently released gangster steals an arms shipment from the IRA intending to kidnap the Home Secretary to exchange for his brother, who is still in prison. Bodie and Doyle arrive just in time at the fully evacuated hospital to deal with a hostage situation.
1-04	20 Jan 1978	1-04	Killer with a Long Arm	Brian Clemens	David Wickes	Michael Latimer, Diane Keen, Alan Tilvern, Milos Kirek, Antony Carrick, Suzanne Danielle, Jonathan Hyde
CI5 uncovers a plot to assassinate a visiting Greek dignitary at the Wimbledon tennis tournament using a sniper rifle with an exceptionally long range.
1-05	27 Jan 1978	1-05	Heroes	James McAteer	William Brayne	John Castle, Bruce Boa, Damien Thomas, Ralph Michael, David Baron, Peter Craze, Jim McManus, Peter Davidson, Luan Peters, Jonathan David
An unpopular US politician is assassinated by masked men at a set of bogus roadworks on a busy highway, and CI5 is forced to protect the witnesses when a newspaper irresponsibly publishes their names.
1-06	3 Feb 1978	1-03	Where the Jungle Ends	Brian Clemens	Raymond Menmuir	David Suchet, Geoffrey Palmer, Robert James, Del Henney, Jeremy Bulloch, Arthur Blake
A gang of ex-mercenaries stages a bank robbery, attracting the attention of a major crime boss who offers to employ them. Bodie, himself an ex-mercenary, is determined to settle some old scores with the gang's leader.
1-07	10 Feb 1978	1-09	Close Quarters	Brian Clemens	William Brayne	Gabrielle Drake, Clive Arrindell, Hildegarde Neil, Madlena Nedeva, Allan Surtees
An off-duty Bodie arrests the leader of a German terrorist cell. Pursued by the rest of the gang, he and his girlfriend hole up in a country vicarage, but find themselves under siege and unable to call for help.
1-08	17 Feb 1978	1-08	Everest Was Also Conquered	Brian Clemens	Francis Megahy	Michael Denison, Richard Greene, Ann Lynn, Kathleen Byron, Gary Waldhorn, Roy Boyd, Llewellyn Rees, Jeremy Hawk, Peter Blake
CI5 is called upon to investigate the 1953 death of a key witness in a corruption trial, following the deathbed confession of a former security chief.
1-09	24 Feb 1978	1-13	When the Heat Cools Off	Brian Clemens	Ray Austin	Lalla Ward, Bernard Kay, Michael Sheard, Graham Weston, Geoffrey Hinsliff, Shelagh Fraser, Arthur White
A girl claims to have new evidence to free her convicted father from prison, a man arrested by Doyle before he joined CI5. Doyle agrees to reopen the case, but does his relationship with the girl cloud his judgement?
1-10	3 Mar 1978	1-12	Stake Out	Dennis Spooner	Benjamin Wickers	David Collings, Pamela Stephenson, Barry Jackson, Tony Osoba, Ronald Leigh-Hunt, Brian Hawksley, Barry Stokes, Trevor Adams
A CI5 agent is murdered and a man dies of plutonium poisoning. How is a bowling alley connected? Bodie and Doyle stake it out.
1-11	10 Mar 1978	1-02	Long Shot	Anthony Read	Ernest Day	Roger Lloyd-Pack, Ed Bishop, Robert Gillespie, Judy Matheson, Nadim Sawalha, Martin Benson, Peter Cellier, Tony Caunter, Archie Tew, John Hamill
An American delegate is saved by Cowley when shots are seemingly fired at him, but no further attempt is made to kill him before he departs the country. CI5 is aware of the presence of a hitman called Ramos, and predicts a second assassination attempt.
1-12	17 Mar 1978	1-11	Look After Annie	Brian Clemens	Charles Crichton	Diana Fairfax, Clifton Jones, Patricia Quinn, Derek Francis, Keith Buckley, Nick Brimble, Frank Jarvis, Michael Walker, John Golightly
A socialist preacher, an old flame of Cowley, becomes a target when she visits London. Bodie and Doyle are set to protect her, without realising who attempts to have her killed.
	Not transmitted in United Kingdom*	1-10	Klansmen	Brian Clemens	Pat Jackson	Trevor Thomas, Antony Booth, Sheila Ruskin, Edward Judd, Louis Mahoney, Oscar James
A "Keep Britain White" group is harassing black residents to leave an area. While most members want to scare the black community, a few members have an ulterior motive. Doyle infiltrates the group. Bodie reveals his racist attitudes, abusing the doctor and nurse who treat him, but relents in the end.

*Transmitted on former UK satellite channel Super in 1987, and currently on Amazon Prime UK and BritBox UK

=== Series 2 (1978) ===
Episode #	UK Transmission Date	Production Block	Title	Writer	Director	Guest cast
2-01	7 October 1978	2-02	Hunter/Hunted	Anthony Read	Anthony Simmons	Bryan Marshall, Cheryl Kennedy, Tony Caunter, Vicki Michelle, John Stratton, Martin Wyldeck, Diana Weston
Doyle tests a prototype new rifle, but it is stolen and "used" against him.
2-02	14 October 1978	2-04	The Rack	Brian Clemens	Peter Medak	Lisa Harrow, Michael Billington, Christopher Ellison, Cyril Luckham, Art Malik, Michael Mundell, Robert James, Robert Lankesheer, Charles Pemberton, Trevor Adams, Allan Surtees
A suspect in CI5's custody dies, allegedly through Doyle's rough treatment. CI5 is put under the scrutiny of a public inquiry, and faces being closed down.
2-03	21 October 1978	2-03	First Night	Gerry O'Hara	David Wickes	Julian Holloway, George Pravda, Arnold Diamond, John Nettleton, Nadim Sawalha, Tony Vogel
An Israeli government minister is kidnapped by hovercraft and helicopter on a visit to London. The only clue is a poorly shot photograph.
2-04	28 October 1978	2-05	Man Without a Past	Michael Armstrong	Martin Campbell	John Carson, John Castle, Ed Bishop, James Bree, Robert Rietti, Maya Woolfe, Anthony Bailey, John Bay, Hilary Ryan, Neville Barber
Bodie is on a date, but the restaurant he is at is bombed and his girlfriend seriously injured. Is Bodie the target?
2-05	4 November 1978	2-06	In the Public Interest	Brian Clemens	Pennant Roberts	Stephen Rea, Tom Georgeson, Colin McCormack, Tony Calvin, John Judd, Paul Hardwick, Allan Surtees
A chief constable impresses people by his city being totally crime-free, but the free rein his officers have lets them infringe suspects' rights in the pursuit of zero tolerance.
2-06	11 November 1978	2-01	Rogue	Dennis Spooner	Ray Austin	Glyn Owen, Pamela Stephenson, Tony Steedman, Robert Gillespie, Neil Hallett, Art Malik, Andy Ho, Martyn Whitby
Veteran CI5 agent Barry Martin lends his expertise to criminal elements in order to fund his lifestyle.
2-07	18 November 1978	2-07	Not a Very Civil Civil Servant	Edmund Ward	Anthony Simmons	Maurice Denham, Harold Innocent, Bill Fraser, Derek Martin, Duncan Preston, Andrew McCulloch, Frank Jarvis, Brian Hall, Donald Bisset
Newly built council houses are falling apart. CI5 investigates the building company's management and the councillors involved.
2-08	25 November 1978	2-08	A Stirring of Dust	Don Houghton	Martin Campbell	Carol Royle, Robert Urquhart, Alan MacNaughtan, André Morell, George Murcell, Shelagh Fraser
A rogue MI6 agent comes home with the threat of spilling the secrets about British security. Can CI5 get him before the KGB or his betrayed colleagues do?
2-09	2 December 1978	2-09	Blind Run	Ranald Graham	Tom Clegg	Kevork Malikyan, Tommy Boyle, Tariq Yunus, Jasmina Hilton, Sandra Payne, Tony Jay, Kevin Brennan, Steve Plytas, Ian Liston, Yashaw Adem, Neville Rofalia
Bodie and Doyle are assigned to protect a foreign official en route to several meetings. But why are the diplomat's moves known by a team of assassins?
2-10	9 December 1978	2-10	Fall Girl	Ranald Graham	William Brayne	Pamela Salem, Frederick Jaeger, Patrick Malahide, Michael Latimer, Sandor Elès, Phillip Joseph, George Irving, John Larsen
An old flame of Bodie's gets him unwittingly involved in an assassination, and he finds himself to be the target of MI6 and CI5.

=== Series 3 (1979) ===
Episode #	UK Transmission Date	Production Block	Title	Writer	Director	Guest cast
3-01	27 October 1979	3-07	The Purging of CI5	Stephen Lister	Dennis Abey	Simon Rouse, Bill Treacher, Christopher Fairbank, Paul Antony-Barber, Sally Harrison
CI5's headquarters are being bombed and its agents assassinated.
3-02	3 November 1979	2-11	Backtrack	Don Houghton	Christopher King	Michael Elphick, Liz Fraser, John Bennett, Stacy Davies, Brian McDermott, Luke Hanson, Geoffrey Bateman, Kevork Malikyan
A burglar comes across a gang of drugs and arms smugglers during a break-in. Not even the police can protect him, and it's up to CI5 to uncover and stop the gang.
3-03	10 November 1979	3-01	Stopover	John Goldsmith	William Brayne	James Laurenson, Michael Gothard, Morris Perry, W. Morgan Sheppard, Frank Jarvis, Alec Linstead
An old colleague of Cowley's has information on a double agent - in exchange for CI5's protection.
3-04	17 November 1979	3-04	Dead Reckoning	Robin Estridge	Dennis Lewiston	Carol Royle, Derek Godfrey, Alan Tilvern, Milos Kirek
An extradited spy's presence in Britain is being kept top-secret, yet the Bulgarians who sent him try their best to make his whereabouts public. When he is murdered, all eyes suspect the spy's daughter.
3-05	24 November 1979	2-13	The Madness of Mickey Hamilton	Christopher Wicking	William Brayne	David Calder, Ian McDiarmid, Marjorie Yates, Shaun Curry, Olu Jacobs, Barry Stanton, Clifton Jones
A man whose daughter is severely brain-damaged after a complicated birth then loses his wife to an overdose. He blames the incompetence of the doctors, and seeks revenge. With the blessing of an unsuspecting priest he systematically starts to wipe out doctors, one by one.
3-06	1 December 1979	3-03	A Hiding to Nothing	Ted Childs	Gerry O'Hara	Gerald Sim, Sylvia Kay, Nadim Sawalha, Lise Hilboldt
Palestinian extremists plan on assassinating one of their ministers when information is leaked to them that he is holding secret diplomatic negotiations in London. CI5 needs to find the leak and keep the diplomat's own security team at bay.
3-07	8 December 1979	3-02	Runner	Michael Feeney Callan	Martin Campbell	Michael Kitchen, James Cosmo, Ed Devereaux, Billy Murray, Barbara Kellerman, Forbes Collins, Sean Caffrey, Keith Marsh
A breakaway group from a criminal gang wants to start a street war, but its leader has other ideas.
3-08	15 December 1979	2-12	Servant of Two Masters	Douglas Watkinson	Ferdinand Fairfax	Tony Scannell, David de Keyser, Glynn Edwards, John Savident, Will Stampe
Has Cowley turned traitor, selling a nerve gas to a foreign dictatorship?

=== Series 4 (1980) ===
Episode #	UK Transmission Date	Production Block	Title	Writer	Director	Guest cast
4-01	7 September 1980	3-09	The Acorn Syndrome	John Kruse	Martin Campbell	Ronald Hines, Michael Craig, Lynda La Plante (billed as Lynda Marchal), Sue Nicholls, Ian Redford, Nigel Humphreys, John Joyce, Charles Pemberton, Christopher Saul
The daughter of a government engineer who develops top-secret defence equipment has been kidnapped. In exchange for her life, he must hand over the plans of one of the projects.
4-02	14 September 1980	4-02	Wild Justice	Ranald Graham	Dennis Abey	Llewellyn Rees, Jack McKenzie, Robert Ashby, Sarah Douglas, Larry Lamb, Zig Byfield, Marsha Fitzalan, Tommy Wright, Frances Low
A psychologist tries to convince CI5 that Bodie's mental state is putting both him and CI5 at risk.
4-03	21 September 1980	3-08	Fugitive	Gerry O'Hara	Dennis Lewiston	Brigitte Kahn, Michael Byrne, Vickery Turner, Paul Antrim, Conrad Asquith, Tony Sibbald, Tania Rogers
A terrorist group kills a CIA agent working in London. CI5 tries to set up a fake arms deal with the group.
4-04	28 September 1980	3-13	Involvement	Brian Clemens	Chris Burt	Patricia Hodge, William Russell, Christopher Guard, Peter Burton, Kirstie Pooley, Philip Anthony
Is the girl Doyle wants to marry involved with drug smuggling?
4-05	5 October 1980	3-06	Need to Know	Brian Clemens	William Brayne	Simon Oates, Tom Georgeson, Yuri Borienko, Patrick O'Connell, Norman Jones, Kristopher Kum, Nigel Miles-Thomas
A former colleague of Cowley's is arrested for being a double agent; the CI5 chief is thus implicated in treachery.
4-06	12 October 1980	3-12	Take Away	Roger Marshall	Douglas Camfield	Chai Lee, John Forgeham, Sharon Duce, Pik-Sen Lim, Arnold Lee, Gertan Klauber, James Marcus, George Little, Andy Ho, Vincent Wong, Rex Wei, Peta Bernard, Kenneth Watson
Innocent Chinese people are being used as heroin traffickers. CI5 joins with Hong Kong police to uncover the truth.
4-07	19 October 1980	4-03	Black Out	Brian Clemens	William Brayne	Linda Hayden, Ben Cross, John Arnatt, Gareth Armstrong, Louis Mahoney
The only clue to a terrorist attack is a girl with amnesia.
4-08	26 October 1980	4-05	Blood Sports	Gerry O'Hara	Phil Méheux	Michelle Newell, Yves Beneyton, Jonathon Morris, Pierce Brosnan, Ruby Wax, Harry Towb, Leonard Trolley, Gerald Martin, Oliver Smith
CI5 steps in to protect the daughter of a South American president after her brother is murdered.
4-09	2 November 1980	3-10	Slush Fund	Roger Marshall	William Brayne	David Swift, Jeremy Young, Stuart Wilson, Lynda Bellingham, Victoria Burgoyne, Timothy Carlton, Chris Sullivan
A reporter has a scoop on a new fighter aircraft being a deathtrap, and when this knowledge is discovered, becomes the target of several countries' officials.
4-10	9 November 1980	4-01	The Gun	Christopher Wicking	Dennis Lewiston	Celia Gregory, Sylvestra Le Touzel, David John, Nigel Pegram
A drug pusher murders an addict. His hastily discarded gun is soon found by a young boy. The pusher must get to the boy before the drug barons do.
4-11	30 November 1980	4-06	Hijack	Roger Marshall	Martin Campbell	Denis Lill, Stephen Yardley, Jill Baker, Rachel Davies, Mark Eden, Robert Rietti, Vic Tablian, Lloyd McGuire, James Snell, Nicholas Donnelly, Dave King
CI5 investigates the theft of silver bullion imported from behind the Iron Curtain.
4-12	7 December 1980	3-05	Mixed Doubles	Brian Clemens	Roger Tucker	Michael Coles, Ian McCulloch, Nickolas Grace, Walter Randall, Mark Wingett, Bill McGuirk, John Barrard, Paul Herzberg, Clifford Earl
A foreign official is visiting, so Bodie and Doyle receive special training to protect him. Meanwhile, two hit-men are being trained to murder him.....
4-13	14 December 1980	3-11	Weekend in the Country	Gerry O'Hara	James Allen	Bryan Pringle, Brian Croucher, Ray Burdis, Louisa Rix, Sarah Lawson, Susan Wooldridge, Jacqueline Reddin, Brian Hawksley, Peter Hill, Pat Gorman
One weekend, when the agents are off-duty and out of the city, fugitive criminals capture the unarmed Bodie and Doyle along with their girlfriends.
4-14	20 December 1980	4-08	Kickback	Stephen Lister	Ian Sharp	Norman Eshley, Roy Purcell, James Faulkner, Marc Boyle, Ian Fairbairn, Ben Howard, Valentino Musetti, Meg Davies
Bodie teams up with his old SAS partner Keller to infiltrate an Italian terrorist group. They fake an assassination, but Keller has an alternative agenda.
4-15	27 December 1980	4-04	It's Only a Beautiful Picture...	Edmund Ward	Dennis Lewiston	Moray Watson, Neil McCarthy, Prunella Gee, Jonathan Newth, Hugh Morton, Antony Carrick, Charmian May, Peter Rutherford, Jo Rowbottom, Stephen Churchett
A gang is exporting rare antiques and top-secret industrial equipment, using the ignorance of Customs and Excise in foreign countries. CI5 decides to set a trap.

=== Series 5 (1982–1983) ===
Episode #	UK Transmission Date	Production Block	Title	Writer	Director	Guest cast
5-01	7 November 1982	4-10	Foxhole on the Roof	Brian Clemens	William Brayne	Ron Pember, Karl Howman, Stanley Meadows, Roderic Leigh
A newly released convict plans to make a fortune by holding a hospital's post-operative ward to ransom, bungled by ex-RAF officer Dunston.
5-02	14 November 1982	4-12	Operation Susie	Ranald Graham	Ian Sharp	Alice Krige, Harold Innocent, Alexander Davion, John Line, Don McKillop, George Raistrick, Bernard Finch
Government department MI17 tries to cover up its bungled drugs raid involving South American nationalists.
5-03	21 November 1982	4-07	You'll Be All Right	Gerry O'Hara	John Crome	Malcolm Storry, Derrick O'Connor, Derek Francis, Hazel McBride, Shirley Dixon, Sally Faulkner, Joanne Bell, Graeme Eton
A criminal gang leader is in hiding, and his family are threatened. He offers to surrender himself if CI5 protects his family and flushes out the person threatening them.
5-04	28 November 1982	5-03	Lawson's Last Stand	Ranald Graham	Ian Sharp	Michael Culver, Stephen Greif, Michael Angelis, Helen Cherry, John Hallam, Prentis Hancock, Donald Pickering, Max Harvey, Allan Mitchell, Roger Nott, Derek Lyons, Ralph Morse
A mentally unstable army officer has disappeared, taking NATO secrets with him.
5-05	5 December 1982	4-09	Discovered in a Graveyard	Christopher Wicking	Anthony Simmons	David Yip, Philip Latham, Derek Waring, Megumi Shimanuki, Richard Moore, Owen Holder, Rayner Bourton, Toni Kanal, Vincent Wong, Rex Wei, Heather Emmanuel
The campaign against a much-hated oriental leader has spilt over into London. CI5 intervenes, and Doyle is shot in revenge. While having a life-saving operation, Doyle has to decide whether to live or die.
5-06	12 December 1982	5-05	Spy Probe	Tony Barwick	Dennis Abey	Barry Stanton, Patrick Ryecart, Paul Daneman, Joyce Grant, Graham Crowden, Nick Stringer, John Hart Dyke
Although broadcast as the sixth episode, this is the very last episode of The Professionals to be filmed. A mysterious organisation assassinates seemingly innocent 'nobodies'. Bodie and Doyle infiltrate and investigate.
5-07	9 January 1983	5-01	Cry Wolf	Paul Wheeler	Phil Méheux	Sheila Ruskin, Rona Anderson, Alan MacNaughtan, David Neal, Ian Bartholomew, Timothy Block, Rex Robinson, Aimée Delamain, Rob Heyland, Vass Anderson
A young lady claims to be continually harassed, and her local constabulary claim she is crying wolf.
5-08	16 January 1983	4-13	The Untouchables	Brian Clemens	William Brayne	Keith Washington, John Junkin, Robert Flemyng, Joseph Marcell, Nick Brimble, Marilyn Galsworthy, Vicki Michelle, Ramsay Williams, Imogen Bickford-Smith
Bodie loses in a private poker game and is indebted to a foreign diplomat. In order to clear what he owes, Bodie must give the diplomat CI5's secrets.
5-09	23 January 1983	4-11	The Ojuka Situation	Dave Humphries	Christopher King	Clarke Peters, Geoffrey Palmer, Shope Shodeinde, Charles Dance, Al Matthews, Colin McCormack, Harry Fowler
The British government want to help Hakim Ojuka, the overthrown leader of an African state, reclaim his country from the rebels that overthrew him. CI5 takes him into its protection, but Cowley's watertight security is leaking, and Ojuka's enemies are on his tail.
5-10	30 January 1983	5-02	A Man Called Quinn	Tony Barwick	Horace Ové	Del Henney, Steven Berkoff, Bernard Archard, Peter Howell, John Owens, Linal Haft
Former secret service agent Quinn is on the run from an asylum, deranged by years of torture by the KGB. He seeks revenge by killing his former SIS comrades.
5-11	6 February 1983	5-04	No Stone	Roger Marshall	Chris Burt	Sarah Neville, John Wheatley, Godfrey James, Briony McRoberts, Chrissie Cotterill, Simon Dutton, Michael Praed, Seymour Green, Brian Miller, Milton Johns
Although broadcast last, this was the fourth episode (out of six) to be filmed in the final production block. A girl rebels against her wealthy background and British justice, claiming they are corrupt. With the help of a sympathetic lawyer, she plans the destruction of legal establishments in London. CI5 intervenes to stop this terror, and becomes collateral damage. Note: Last regular appearances of Gordon Jackson as George Cowley, Martin Shaw as Ray Doyle and Lewis Collins as William Bodie.
