= Juan de Bolas =

Chief of the Jamaican Maroons

- Born: Juan de Bolas; 1604?
- Died: 1664; Jamaica
- Other name: Juan Lubolo
- Known for: First Chief of a prominent Jamaican Palenque, the inhabitants of which became the Jamaican Maroons

Juan de Bolas originally Juan Lubolo (1604?–1664) was one of the first chiefs of the Jamaican Maroons.

== Background ==
When the English captured Jamaica from the Spanish in the 1655 Invasion of Jamaica, the latter freed their slaves, who fled into the mountainous forests of the interior, where they established independent communities of Free black people in Jamaica, and fought a guerrilla war against the English. It is likely that these early Spanish Maroons were descended from both escaped African slaves and Taino men and women.

Juan de Bolas and his Maroon community was based primarily around the town of Lluidas Vale. The Spanish attempted to retake the Colony of Jamaica, and to this end Don Christobal de Ysasi relied on his alliance with the Spanish Maroons to secure this victory.

== Juan switches sides ==
However, Governor Edward D'Oyley succeeded in persuading one of the leaders of the Spanish Maroons, Juan de Bolas, to switch sides and join the English along with his Maroon warriors. In 1660, when Ysasi realised that de Bolas had joined the English, he admitted that the Spanish no longer had a chance of recapturing the island, since de Bolas and his men knew the mountainous interior better than the Spanish and the English. Ysasi gave up on his dreams, and fled to Cuba.

The English named two rivers and a mountain after him to commemorate his assistance in expelling the Spaniards and bringing an end to Spanish Jamaica, as well as capturing hostile Maroons. The English appointed him Colonel of the Black Militia and guaranteed his palenque land and liberties "for ever".

== War with other Maroons and Death ==
There was at least one other group of Spanish Maroons who did not agree to terms with the English authorities, led by a Maroon named Juan de Serras. The English called this group the Karmahaly Maroons, because they came from Los Vermejales. The English colonial authorities then used de Bolas and his "Black Militia" to hunt de Serras and his Maroons.

De Bolas was killed in an ambush by an unaligned palenque in 1664. Some historians believe that de Bolas was killed by Maroons from the group led by de Serras. Following the death of de Bolas, his group of Black Militia Maroons faded from history, while de Serras and his community continued to trouble the English authorities for years to come.

== Legacy ==
De Bolas is mentioned in Segu, an historical novel from Guadeloupean author Maryse Condé.

Jamaican novelist Victor Stafford Reid wrote an historical novel entitled The Jamaicans in 1976, and the main character was Juan de Bolas.

Jamaican singer Eric Donaldson named his 1979 Dynamic Sounds album after De Bolas, entitled 'Juan De Bolas'.

== See also ==
- Juan de Bolas Mountain
- Juan de Bolas River
