= Arthur Selborne Jelf =

British colonial administrator (1876–1947)

Sir Arthur Selborne Jelf CMG (10 October 1876 – 26 February 1947) was a British colonial administrator who was twice acting Governor of Jamaica.

== Biography ==
The son of the Rev Dr George Edward Jelf, Master of Charterhouse, Arthur Selborne Jelf was educated at Marlborough College and Exeter College, Oxford.

He served in the Malayan Civil Service from 1899 to 1925, with a break from 1917 to 1919 during which he was seconded for military service in intelligence work. He was transferred to Jamaica in 1925 as Colonial Secretary, and held the post until his retirement in 1935. Jelf was acting Governor of Jamaica from October 1925 to 26 April 1926, and 9 November 1932 – 21 November 1932. In 1934, he visited Moneague there to make an assessment of its tourist potential.

After his retirement, Jelf returned to England, where was a member of Hythe Borough Council from 1936 to 1940, and was Mayor of Hythe from 1938–39.

Jelf was appointed CMG in 1927 and knighted in 1932.

== Family ==
Jelf firstly married Blanche (died 1917), daughter of John Connell. He married secondly Evelyn Mary, daughter of A. E. Hardcastle; they had two sons and one daughter.
