= Henry Cunningham =

Scottish Whig politician

Henry Cunningham (c. 1678–1736), of Boquhan, Gorgunnock, Stirling, was a Scottish Whig politician who sat in the House of Commons from 1709 to 1734. He was given the post of Governor of Jamaica, but died two months after landing there. A description of Cunningham appears in the introduction to Scott's historical novel ‘’Rob Roy’’.

== Early life ==
Cunningham was the only son of William Cunningham of Boquhan and his first wife Margaret Erskine, daughter of David Erskine, 2nd Lord Cardross. He was Commissioner justiciary for Highlands in 1701 and 1702. By 1708, he married Jean Lennox daughter of John Lennox of Woodhead, Campsie, Stirling.

== Career ==
Cunningham stood as a Whig for Stirlingshire at the 1708 British general election but there was a dispute among the parties and the sheriff, on the pretext that Cunningham had only lately acquired a freehold, made a double return. However the Whig majority in the House of Commons ensured that he was seated.as Member of Parliament on 11 January 1709. He voted for the impeachment of Dr Sacheverell, but made little impression in Parliament. He lost his supporters at Stirlingshire and at the 1710 British general election he lost the seat. However he was returned in the same election in a contest at his fall-back seat at Stirling Burghs. He supported a Tory candidate in a disputed election and was listed among the ‘worthy patriots’ who exposed the mismanagements of the previous ministry, but otherwise sided with the Whigs for most of the Parliament. He voted on 17 January 1712 against the Tory motion to send the younger Robert Walpole to the Tower, and on 7 February against the Scottish toleration bill. He twice told against the bill restoring lay patronage in Scotland and was teller for three other bills affecting Scotland. He presented an address on the peace from Stirling Burgh in March but also voted against the ministry over the French commerce bill in June. In 1713 he became a burgess of Edinburgh and was returned again for Stirling Burghs. He supported the Hanoverian succession and in January 1714, was reported to be travelling around the west of Scotland with his uncle Colonel John Erskine promoting Hanoverian addresses. He was Commissioner justiciary for the Highlands from 1714 to 1716. He voted against the expulsion of Richard Steele in March and in May he voted with other Scottish Whigs in favour of extending the schism bill to cover Catholic education. He was a signatory to the proclamation of George I in Edinburgh, and presented a loyal address from Stirlingshire in October 1714. He was introduced at court by the Duke of Argyll.

Cunningham succeeded to his mother's estate in 1715. He was returned unopposed for Stirling Burghs at the 1715 British general election and developed his connection with the Duke of Argyll. He was awarded the post of muster master in Scotland, which he gave up in 1716 to become a commissioner for the forfeited estates. He was described as ‘the honestest fellow among them’. He voted with the Administration in every recorded division, except that on Lord Cadogan in June 1717, when, with most of Argyll's supporters, he voted with the Whig minority. He built on his father's electoral interest in Stirling Burghs and also built up one at Inverkeithing. He bought tenements from the 1st Earl of Rosebery, and became provost of Inverkeithing in succession to him in 1720. With his pleasant manners and great address, Cunningham was considered to be the best boroughmonger of the time. In 1722, he became a Burgess of Glasgow and also succeeded to Boquhan on his father's death. At the 1722 British general election, he was returned unopposed for Stirling Burghs again. When the work of the commissioners for the forfeited estates ended in 1725, he resumed the post of muster master in Scotland. He continued to develop a strong electoral interest in county and burghs and at the 1727 British general election was returned for Stirling Burghs and Stirlingshire, and chose to sit for Stirlingshire. By the 1730s he had become a key player in the electoral management system of Lord Ilay, Walpole's electoral manager in Scotland. In 1733 he was wounded while acting as bodyguard to Walpole against an anti-excise mob. Cunningham was getting into financial difficulties and at the end of 1733, he asked Walpole for a post freeing him ‘from the trouble of parliaments and elections’. He was appointed Governor of Jamaica. His departure was delayed when he was sent to Stirling at the request of Ilay, to oppose James Erskine, and Thomas, Lord Erskine, who were standing as opposition candidates there in the 1734 British general election.

== Death and legacy ==
Cunningham did not arrive in Jamaica until 18 December 1735, and died less than two months later on 12 February 1736, aged 59. His wife predeceased him and they had no children. His estates were subsequently sold to pay his debts.

Cunningham appears in an introduction to Rob Roy by Sir Walter Scott as putting Rob Roy to flight when the outlaw picked a fight with him. The author described Cunningham as uniting ‘a natural high spirit and daring character with an affectation of delicacy of address and manners amounting to foppery.'.

Cunningham is the inspiration for the character of Archibald Cunningham, the antagonist of the 1995 historical drama Rob Roy. Tim Roth earned a BAFTA for Best Supporting Actor and was nominated for an Academy Award for Best Supporting Actor for his performance as Cunningham.

Parliament of Great Britain
Preceded by Parliament of Scotland	Member of Parliament for Stirlingshire; 1709–1710	Succeeded by Sir Hugh Paterson
Preceded by John Erskine	Member of Parliament for Stirling Burghs; 1710–1722	Succeeded by Lord Erskine
Preceded by John Graham	Member of Parliament for Stirlingshire; 1722–1734	Succeeded by Sir James Campbell
