= Mocho Mountains =

Mountain range in Jamaica

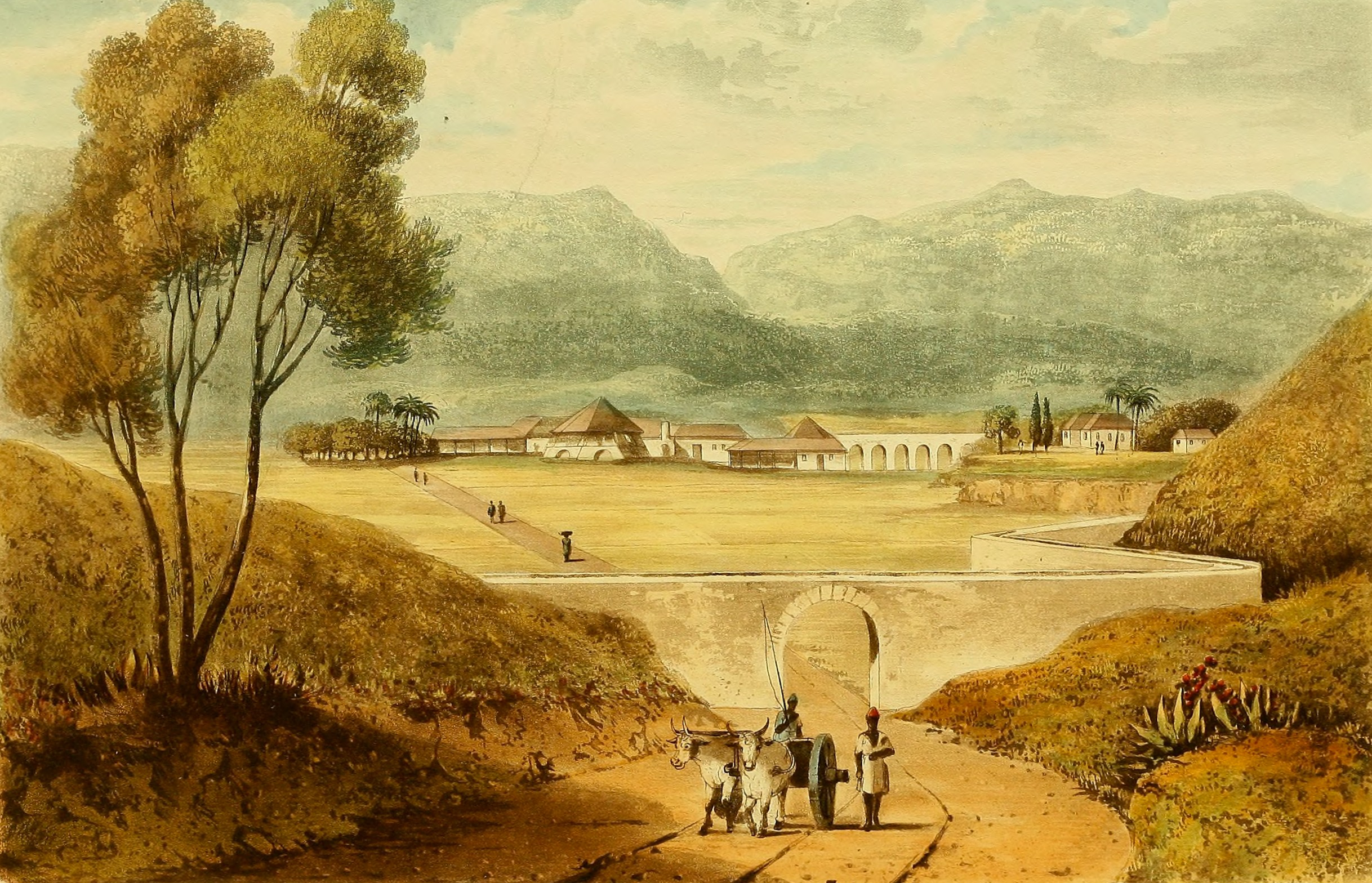
- Whitney Estate, 1820 The Mocho Mountains are in the background

Highest point
- Coordinates: 18°03′N 77°21′W

Geography
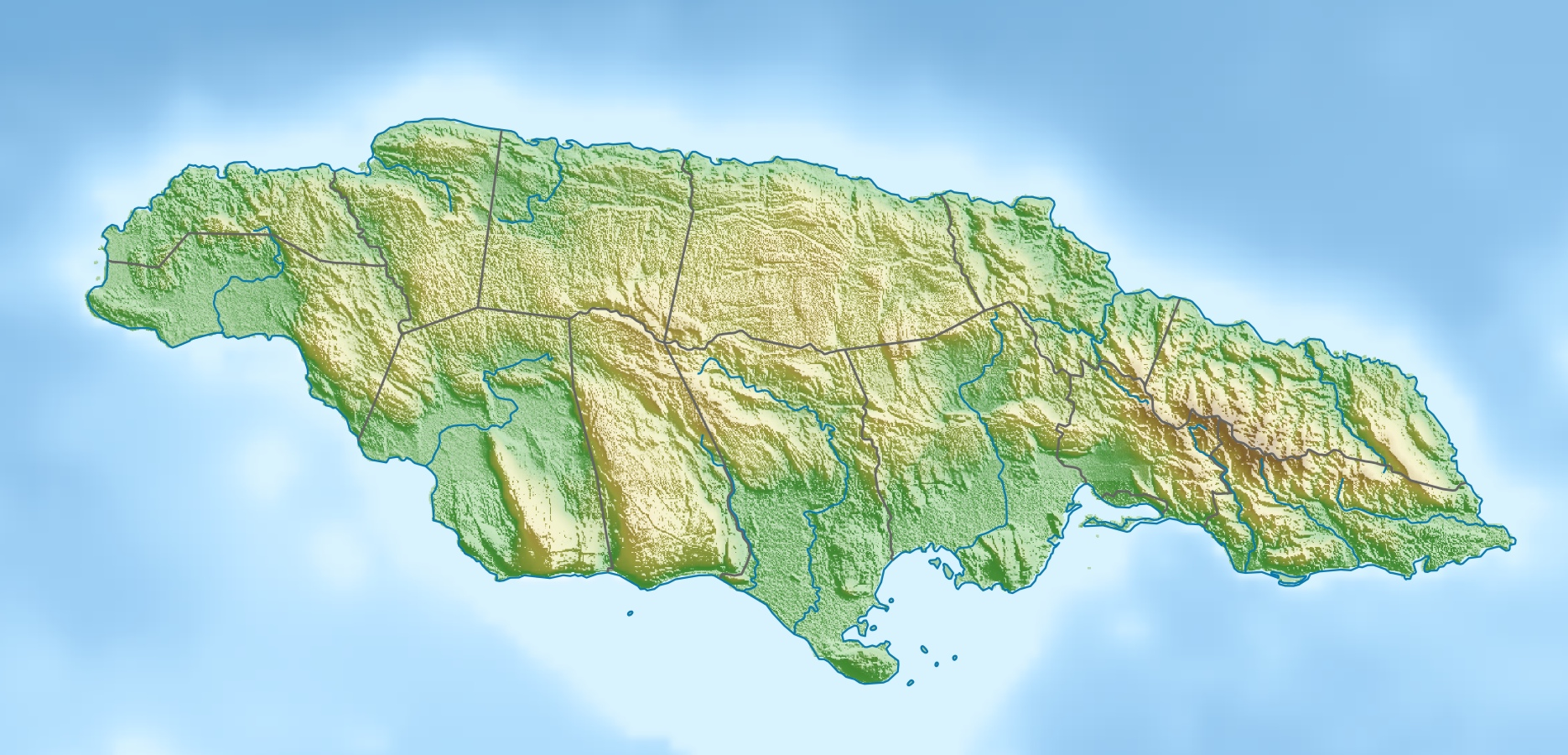
- Location within Jamaica
- Country: Jamaica
- Region: South central

The Mocho Mountains are a mountain range in south-central Jamaica.

The area was historically a site for bauxite mining, which led to deforestation in the area.
