= Juan de Bolas Mountain =

Mountain in Jamaica

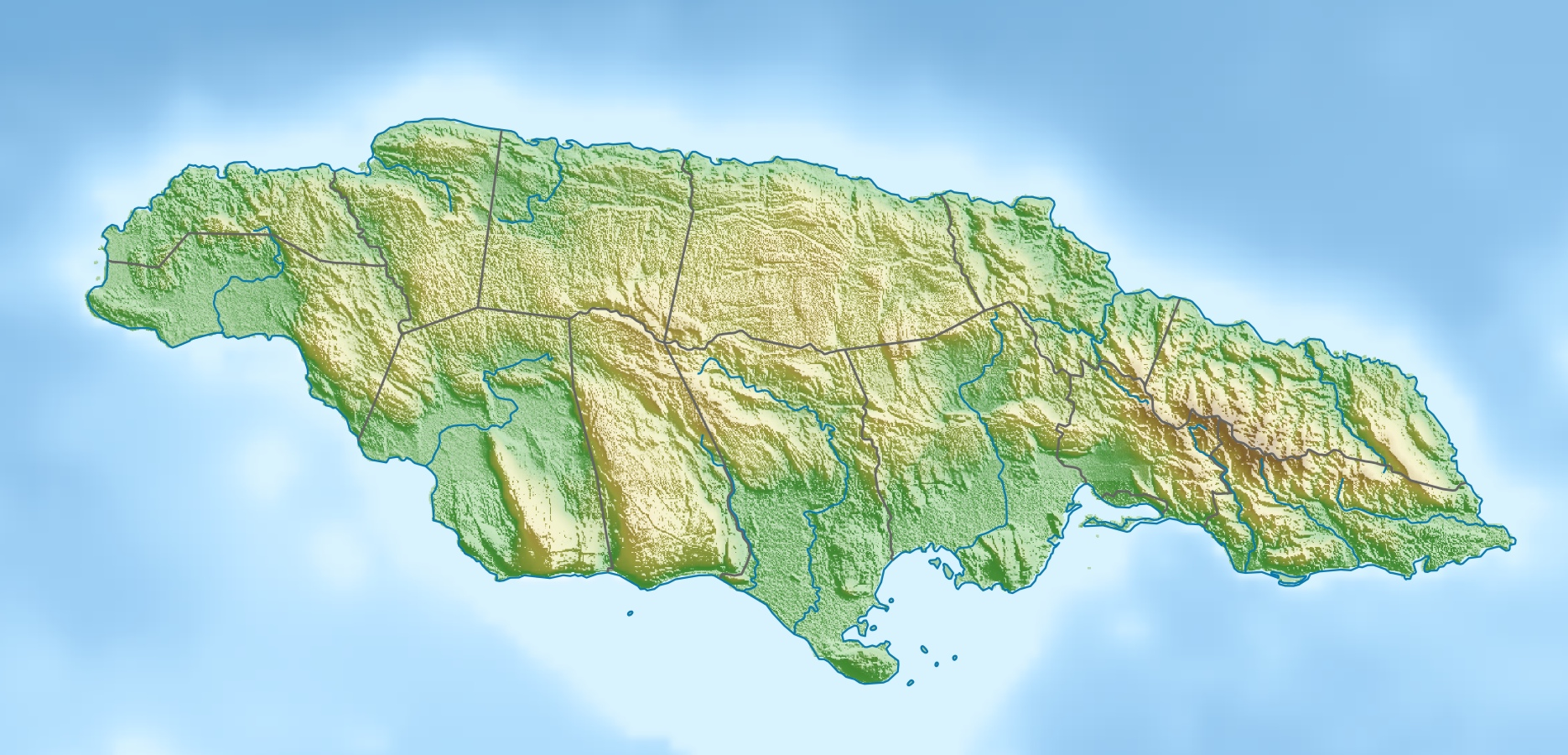
- Location within Jamaica

Highest point
- Elevation: 2,743 ft (836 m)
- Coordinates: 18°04′14″N 77°07′36″W

Geography
- Location: Jamaica

Juan de Bolas Mountain in Saint Catherine, Jamaica (some sources say Clarendon) is named after Juan de Bolas, A Chief of a Group of Maroons who sided with the Spanish during the British Spanish war in Jamaica 1655. He was caught by the British and turned to their side and was instrumental in defeating the Spanish. He would then betray the maroons by revealing their settlement to the British and serving as a Maroon Hunter

== See also ==
- Juan de Bolas River
