= John Ayscough =

John Ayscough (died 1735) was Chief Justice of Jamaica in 1724.

Ayscough also served as Acting Governor of the Colony of Jamaica from 1726 to 1728 and 1734–5, when the island was embroiled in fighting the Maroons in the First Maroon War. He was unsuccessful in his attempts to subdue the Jamaican Maroons. He died in 1735, during his second term as acting governor.
