= Edward D'Oyley =

17th-century English army officer and colonial administrator of Jamaica

Edward D'Oyley or Doyley (1617 – 1675) was an English soldier who served as Governor of Jamaica on two occasions.

== Biography ==
D'Oyley was a Parliamentarian who served in the New Model Army in Wiltshire and in Ireland. In 1654 he sailed to the West Indies as a lieutenant-colonel in General Robert Venables' regiment. Venables had been ordered to the West Indies to advance the Parliamentarian cause and to repel Spanish advances. Once there, Venables raised a local regiment and appointed D'Oyley as its colonel.

After the death in 1655 of Major-General Richard Fortescue, D'Oyley was elected commander-in-chief of all the Jamaican forces. Although temporarily displaced by the Cromwellian protegés Robert Sedgwick and William Brayne, command of the forces ultimately devolved completely upon D'Oyley in September 1657. As military commander, he beat off Spanish attempts to take control of the Caribbean in 1657 and 1658. At the Restoration of the monarchy in 1660, Charles II confirmed him in his position as the first Governor of the Colony of Jamaica, a position he held until 1662, when he was replaced by the Royalist Thomas Hickman-Windsor, 1st Earl of Plymouth.

Much of D'Oyley's time was taken up fighting the Maroons in the mountainous forests of the interior; they were runaway slaves who secured their freedom from their Spanish masters when the English took the island. In about 1660, he persuaded the leader of one of the Maroon bands, Juan de Bolas, to switch sides and join the English. Besides this, D'Oyley was unable to persuade Juan de Serras, leader of the Karmahaly Maroons, to follow suit, and this group continued to fight against the English. During his tenure as governor, he complained of how the local traders were causing a large importation of liquor and causing drunkenness; he also complained that local settlers were more interested in joining privateer or pirate expeditions than engaging in the industry of planting.

In 1662, D'Oyley returned to England, where he established himself in St Martin-in-the-Fields, an Anglican parish in the City of Westminster, London. He died in London in March 1675.

== See also ==
- History of the British West Indies
