= William Brayne =

English soldier

Commander of Jamaica
- In office December 1656 – 2 September 1657
- Preceded by: Edward D'Oyley
- Succeeded by: Edward D'Oyley

Personal details
- Died: 2 September 1657

William Brayne (died 2 September 1657) was an English soldier who served as Commander of Jamaica from 1656 to his death. He fought for the New Model Army in Scotland during Glencairn's rising.

== Career ==
The earliest record of William Brayne is mentioning him as a lieutenant colonel in Scotland in 1653.

Matthew Alured was initially in command of 1,000 soldiers in the New Model Army, but was removed after being suspected of disloyalty and was replaced by Brayne. During Glencairn's rising soldiers were brought from northern Ireland to the isles of Lewis and Mull under the command of Brayne. Small garrisons were placed across Scotland in the 1650s and Brayne was made governor of Inverlochy, Highland.

Oliver Cromwell sent Brayne to Jamaica. Brayne selected 1,200 soldiers to come with him to Jamaica, but 200 of these men drowned off the coast of Ulster due to a winter storm. His ships were hit by more storms in the Bay of Biscay. He recruited men after stopping in Barbados. Brayne replaced Edward D'Oyley as Commander of Jamaica in December 1656. At Cagway he constructed a house for himself, warehouses for the military, and a naval base.

Robert Sedgwick, who was the commander in chief of the army, died in 1656 and his position was filled by Brayne. Brayne initially only commanded the army while William Goodsonn commanded the navy, but Goodsonn left and naval command was given to Brayne. Brayne was the first administrator of Jamaica to assume command over both the army and navy and this was continued by his successors.

Brayne died on 2 September 1657. Before his deateh Brayne appointed D'Oyley as his successor. Cromwell did not officially appoint a replacement for Brayne.

== Works cited ==
=== Books ===
- Campbell, Alastair (2002). A History of Clan Campbell: From Flodden to the Restoration. Edinburgh University Press. ISBN 9781902930183. JSTOR 10.3366/j.ctv2f4vpgm.
- Gentles, Ian (2022). The New Model Army: Agent of Revolution. Yale University Press. doi:10.2307/j.ctv29sfzx5. ISBN 9780300265200. JSTOR j.ctv29sfzx5.
- Knight, James (2021). The Natural, Moral, and Political History of Jamaica, and the Territories thereon Depending: From the First Discovery of the Island by Christopher Columbus to the Year 1746. University of Virginia Press. ISBN 9780813945576.
- Webb, Stephen (1979). The Governors-General: The English Army and the Definition of the Empire, 1569-1681. University of North Carolina Press. ISBN 0807813311. JSTOR 10.5149/9781469600017_webb.
- Wilson, David; Kwan, Nathan; Coakley, John (2024). The Problem of Piracy in the Early Modern World: Maritime Predation, Empire, and the Construction of Authority at Sea. Amsterdam University Press. ISBN 9789048554263.

=== Journals ===
- Pestana, Carla (2014). "Early English Jamaica without Pirates". William and Mary Quarterly. 71 (3). Omohundro Institute of Early American History and Culture: 321–360. doi:10.5309/willmaryquar.71.3.0321. JSTOR willmaryquar.71.3.0321.
- Pestana, Carla (2017). "State Formation from the Vantage of Early English Jamaica: The Neglect of Edward Doyley". Journal of British Studies. 56 (3). Cambridge University Press: 483–505. doi:10.1017/jbr.2017.60. JSTOR 26599094.
