= Jamaica women's national football team =

Women's national association football team representing Jamaica

Jamaica
- Nickname: The Reggae Girlz
- Association: Jamaica Football Federation
- Confederation: CONCACAF
- Head coach: Hubert Busby Jr.
- Captain: Khadija Shaw
- Most caps: Chantelle Swaby (49)
- Top scorer: Khadija Shaw (62)
- FIFA code: JAM
First colours	Second colours

FIFA ranking
- Current: 40 ▲1 (20 October 2026)
- Highest: 37 (August 2023)
- Lowest: 81 (May – September 2006)

First international
- Haiti 1–0 Jamaica (Port-au-Prince, Haiti; 17 April 1991)

Biggest win
- Dominica 0–18 Jamaica (Gros Islet, Saint Lucia; 29 November 2025)

Biggest defeat
- United States 10–0 Jamaica (Canada; 19 August 1994); Canada 11–1 Jamaica (Brazil; 18 July 2007); Paraguay 10–0 Jamaica (Viña del Mar, Chile; 25 October 2023)

World Cup
- Appearances: 2 (first in 2019)
- Best result: Round of 16 (2023)

CONCACAF W Championship
- Appearances: 7 (first in 1991)
- Best result: Third place (2018, 2022)

The Jamaica women's national football team, nicknamed the "Reggae Girlz", represents Jamaica in international women's football. They are one of the top women's national football teams in the Caribbean region along with Trinidad and Tobago and Haiti. In 2008, the team was disbanded after it failed to get out of the group stage of Olympic Qualifying, which notably featured the United States and Mexico. The program was restarted in 2014 after a nearly six-year hiatus, finishing second at the 2014 Women's Caribbean Cup after losing 1–0 against Trinidad and Tobago in the final. The team is backed by ambassador Cedella Marley, the daughter of Bob Marley; she helps raise awareness for the team, encourages development, and provides for it financially. Jamaica qualified for the FIFA Women's World Cup for the first time in 2019, but the team was eliminated after losing all its matches in the group stage. At the 2023 World Cup Jamaica made the Round of 16 for the first time, after holding both France and Brazil to 0–0 draws and winning their first ever match at a World Cup against Panama 1–0. Jamaica is set to co-host the 2031 FIFA Women's World Cup along with Costa Rica, Mexico and United States, giving them an automatic qualification as co-host.

== History ==
=== Founding ===
Women's football in Jamaica started with the founding of the Jamaican Women's Football association (founded by Andrea Lewis, its first president) in 1987.

=== 1990s ===
On 17 April 1991 the team competed in its first international match against Haiti, which they lost 1–0. In August 1994, the Reggae Girlz were defeated 10–0 by the United States.

=== 2000s ===
In 2002, the Reggae Girlz qualified for the 2002 CONCACAF Women's Gold Cup, the qualifying tournament for the 2003 FIFA Women's World Cup, but lost all of their preliminary round games. In 2006, the team qualified for the Women's Gold Cup again and finished in fourth place.

=== 2010s ===
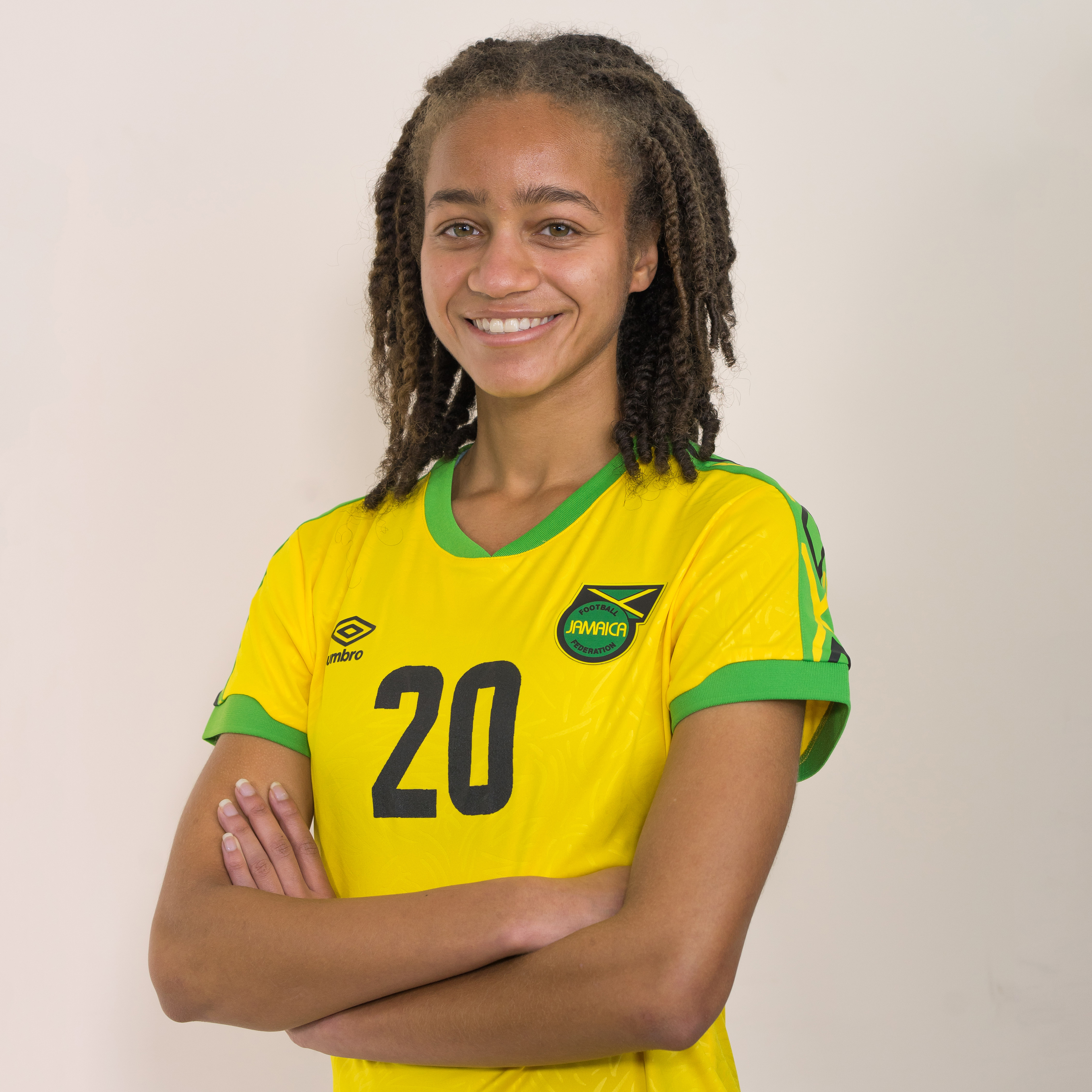
Giselle Washington

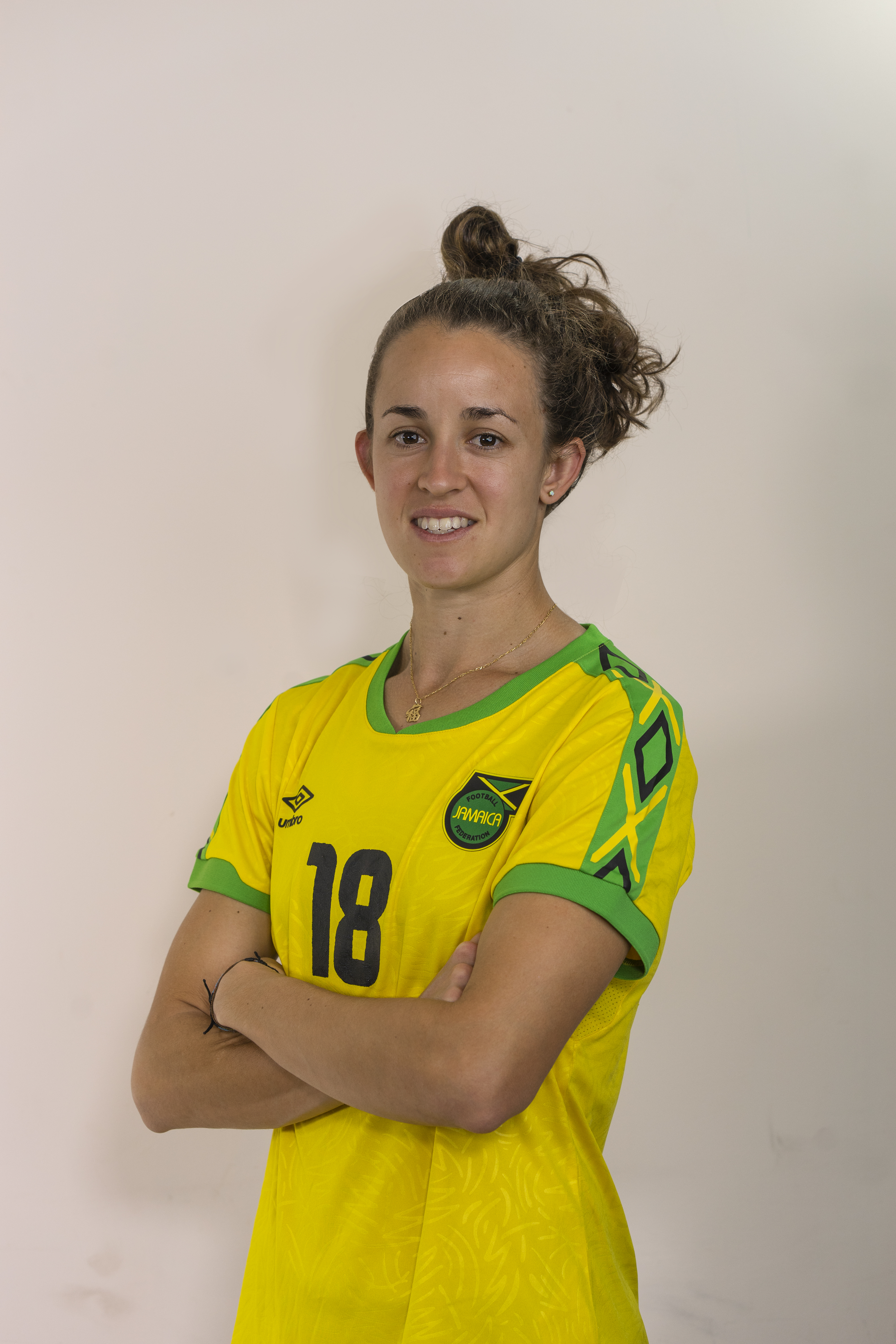
Havana Solaun

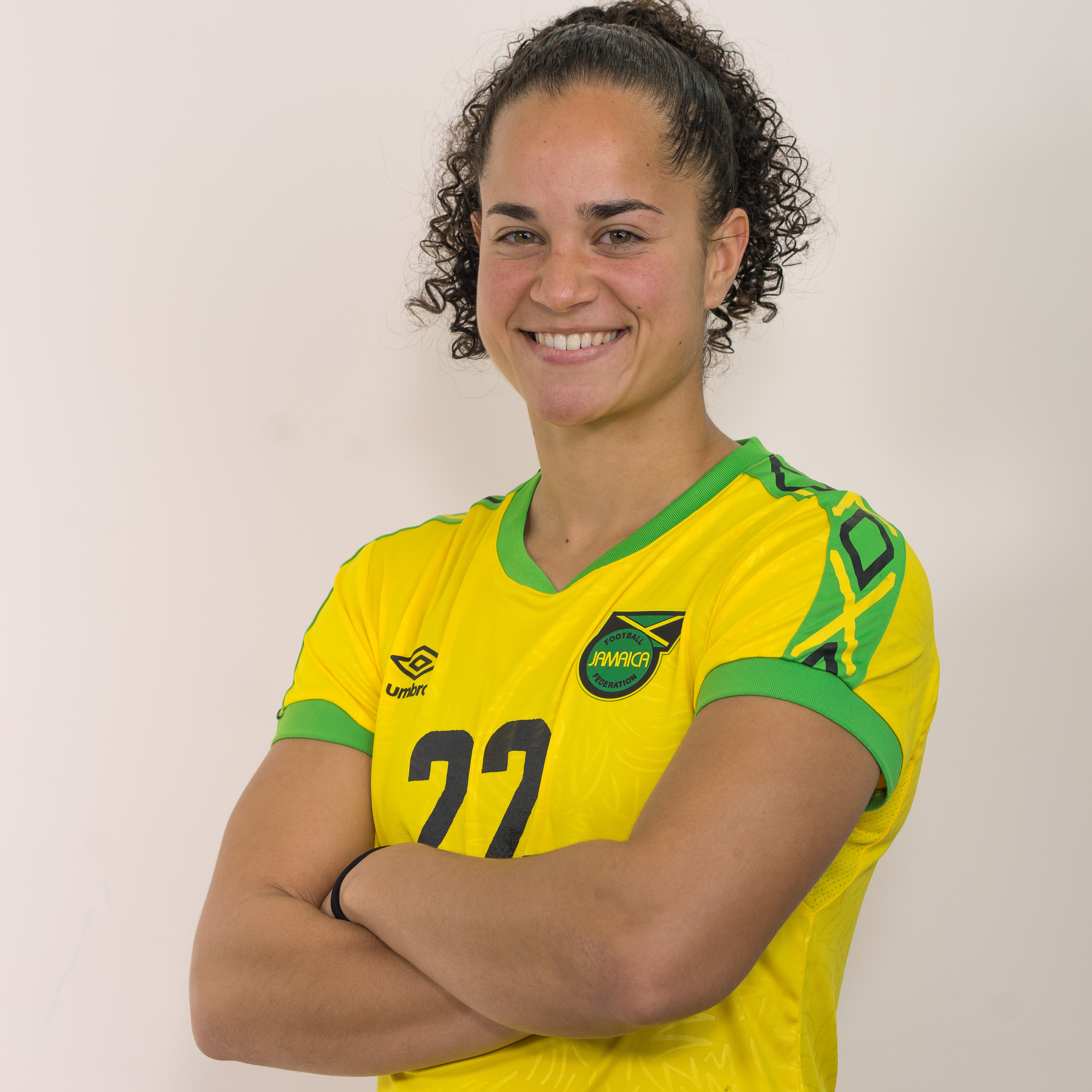
Kayla McCoy

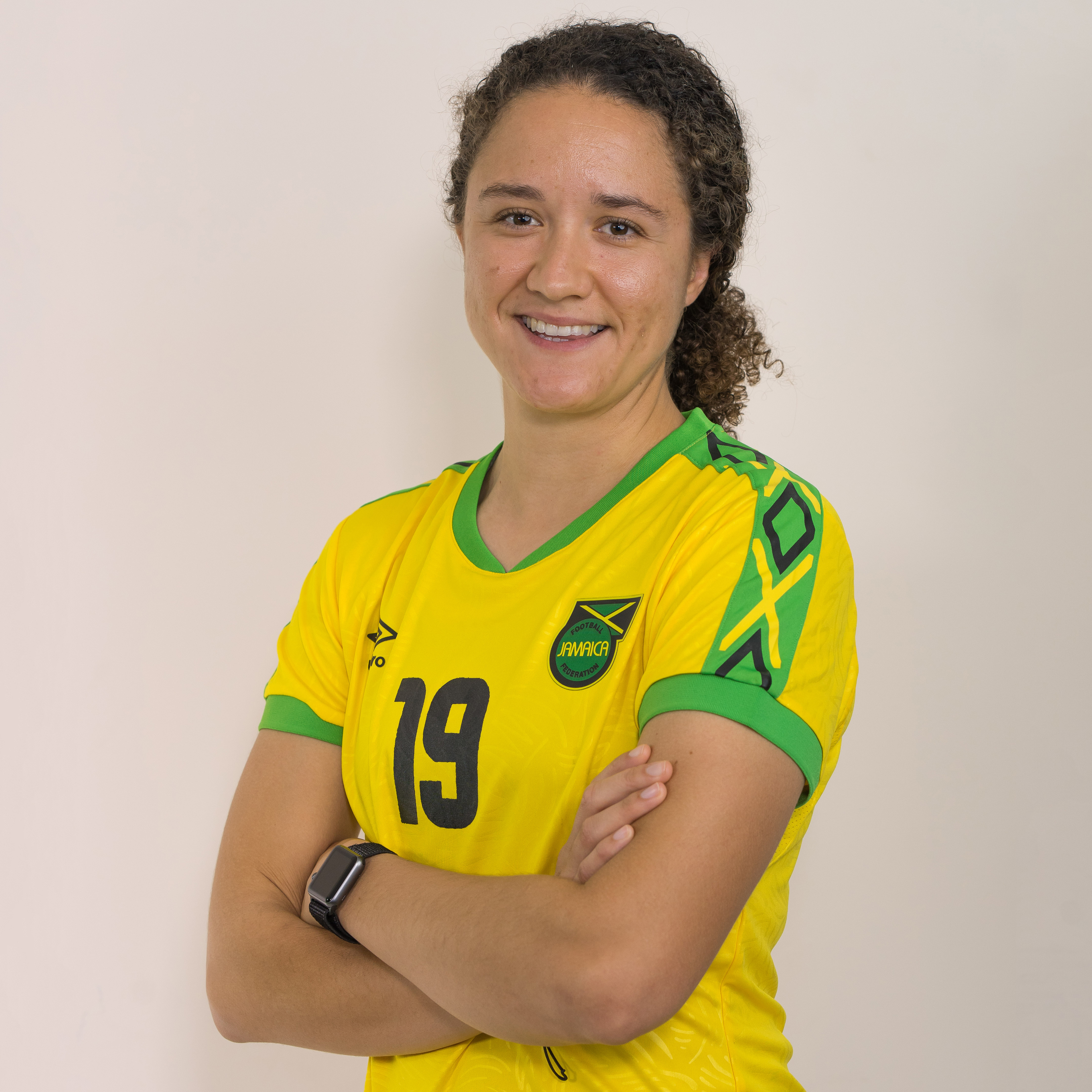
Laura Jackson

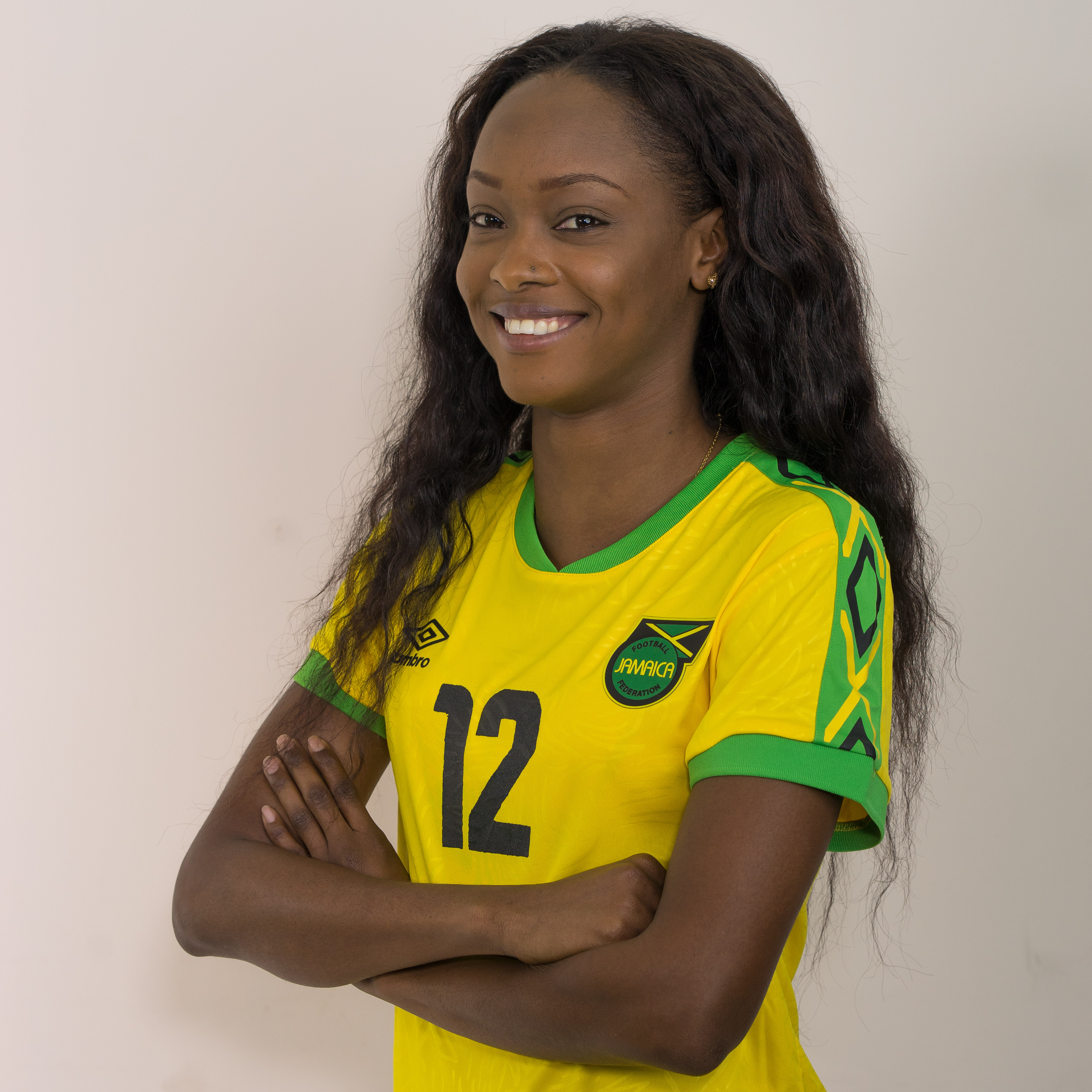
Sashana Campbell

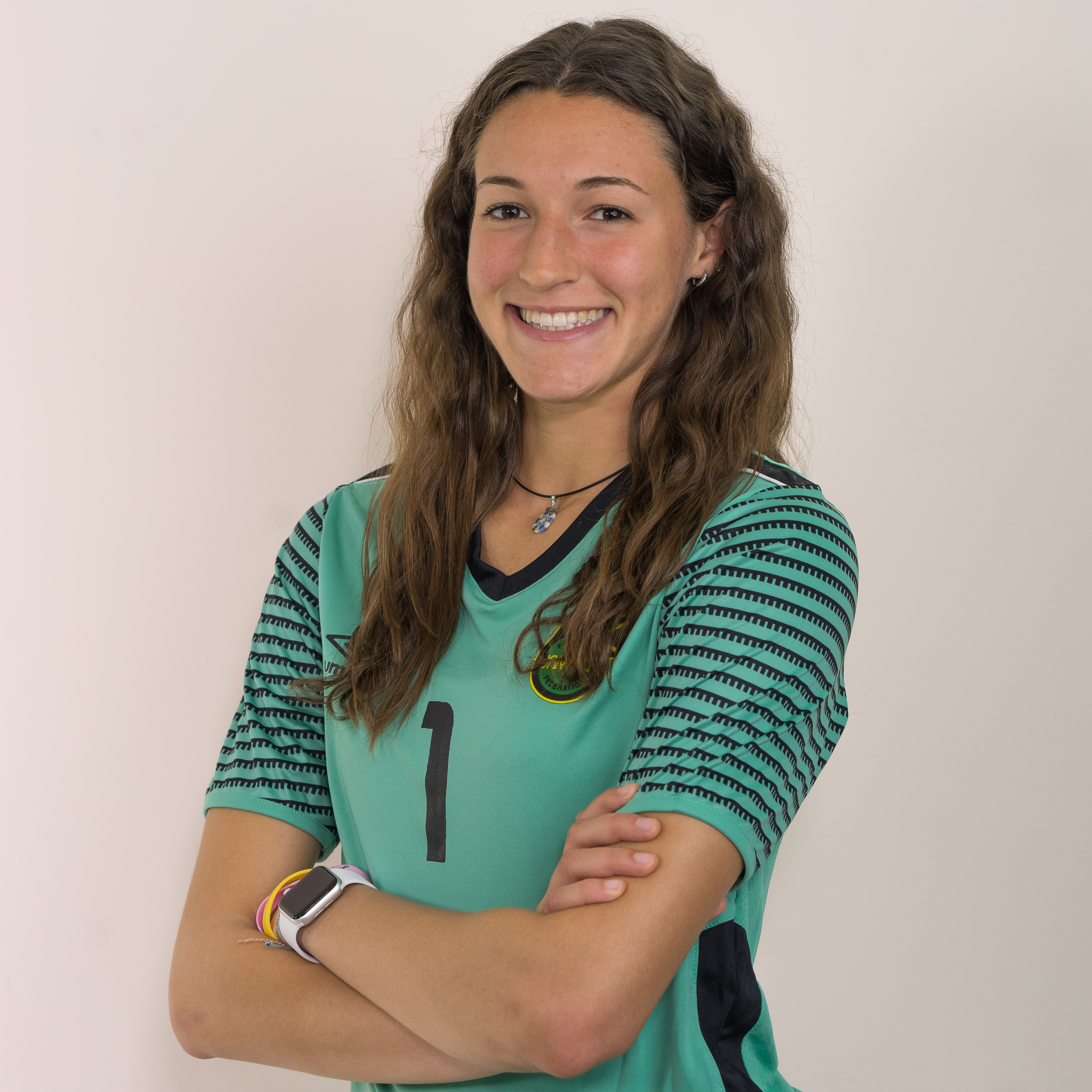
Sydney Schneider

In 2010, due to lack of funding, the Jamaica Football Federation (JFF) cut the senior women's program as well as the women's Olympic program. Subsequently, the team was unable to participate in the qualifiers for the 2011 FIFA Women’s World Cup. In 2011, due to over three years of inactivity, Jamaica was not ranked in the FIFA Women's World Rankings.

In April 2014, Cedella Marley was named the team's official ambassador and helped the team with their fundraising efforts. On 24 June 2014, the team launched the fundraising campaign "Strike Hard for the Reggae Girlz!" to raise $50,000 to pay for practices, travel expenses, housing, nutrition, and equipment in preparation for the 2014 CONCACAF Women's Championship where they hoped to secure a spot at the 2015 FIFA Women's World Cup.

In July 2014, it was announced that Jamaica was looking for players with Jamaican heritage in countries as far as the United Kingdom in order to improve their squad for the 2014 Women Caribbean Cup in Trinidad and Tobago. The team again went unranked by FIFA in June 2017.

In May 2018, Jamaica began the first round of Caribbean Zone qualifying, this was the first time the team had assembled in two years. Jamaica won their group and advanced to the final round of Caribbean Zone qualifying. They hosted the final round tournament and won all four games securing their spot at the 2018 CONCACAF Women's Championship. The same year, Jamaica competed in the 2018 Central American and Caribbean Games. In the group stage, they had a record of one win and two losses, but did not advance to the knockout round. At the 2018 CONCACAF Women's Championship, Jamaica was drawn into Group B alongside Canada, Costa Rica and Cuba. In their first match against Canada, they played well but lost 2–0. Jamaica secured an upset 1–0 victory over Costa Rica in their second match, thanks in part to the great play of goalkeeper Sydney Schneider. In their final group match against Cuba, Jamaica won 9–0. As a result of Costa Rica losing their final group match, Jamaica finished second in their group and advanced to the semi-finals where they would face the number one ranked United States. The US defeated Jamaica 6–0, in the semi-final. Jamaica won the third place match against Panama on penalty kicks, securing a spot at the 2019 FIFA Women's World Cup. Jamaica is the first Caribbean nation to ever qualify for a Women's World Cup and became the first Caribbean country to have both men's and women's teams to participate in men's and women's World Cup. Interestingly, its male counterparts also qualified to the only FIFA World Cup also in France.

Jamaica placed in Group C with Italy, Australia and Brazil, and was considered as an underdog, being rated the lowest in the group. Eventually, they finished last in the group after losing all matches but scored a historic lone goal by Havana Solaun.

=== 2020s ===
After several coaching changes, Lorne Donaldson was named head coach in 2022. In July 2022, Jamaica qualified for their 2nd World Cup, which is a historic feat, considering its men's counterparts have been unable to do the same. On 29 July 2023, Jamaica had its first Women's World Cup win, which was against Panama.

On 2 August 2023, Jamaica drew 0–0 against Brazil, successfully reaching the knockout rounds for the first time; this made Jamaica the first Caribbean country to reach the knockout rounds in any Women's World Cup.

In October 2023, the players released a joint statement outlining that no players would take part in the planned World Cup qualifying fixtures. The reasons stated were lack of communication, missing payments and general mistreatment.

== Kit ==
The national team have used four clothing manufacturers to supply the official kit for Jamaica. The team's first supplier was Italian manufacturer Lanzera in 1995 before it merged with Kappa a year later. This deal was terminated after the 1998 World Cup. In 2000, the JFF signed a deal with German sporting brand Uhlsport, which lasted until 2006. After another three-year contract with Kappa between 2012 and 2014, the JFF signed a four-year deal with Emirati sportswear company Romai Sports for US$4.8 million.

In 2021, Umbro was the kit provider for Jamaica. In 2022, Adidas signed a deal to become the new kit provider for Jamaica starting in 2023.

== Results and fixtures ==
The following is a list of match results in the last 12 months, as well as any future matches that have been scheduled.

Legend

Win Draw Lose Fixture

=== 2025 ===
28 October Friendly	Trinidad and Tobago	1–4	Jamaica	Couva, Trinidad and Tobago
	Gosine 13'		Brown 11', 84'; Thomas 52'; Harris 84'	Stadium: Ato Bolden Stadium; Attendance: 535

29 November 2026 CONCACAF W Championship Q	Dominica	0–18	Jamaica	Gros Islet, Saint Lucia
15:00 UTC−4		Report (FIFA); Report (CONCACAF)	Plummer 2'; Shaw 4', 39', 43'; Van Zanten 7', 21'; Brown 9', 35', 82'; Primus 11'; Paul 26' (o.g.); Blackwood 51', 89'; Buckley 80', 90+2'; Thomas 86', 88'; Hayles 90+1'	Stadium: Daren Sammy Cricket Ground; Referee: Astrid Gramajo (Guatemala)

=== 2026 ===
2 March 2026 CONCACAF W Championship Q	Nicaragua	2–3	Jamaica	Managua, Nicaragua
18:00 UTC−6	Flores 27' (pen.); Márquez 82'	Report (FIFA); Report (CONCACAF)	Shaw 37', 58'; Hayles 68'	Stadium: Nicaragua National Football Stadium; Referee: Sandra Arteaga (El Salvador)

10 April 2026 CONCACAF W Championship Q	Jamaica	4–0	Antigua and Barbuda	Kingston, Jamaica
19:00 UTC−5	Shaw 45+1' (pen.), 49', 55' Blackwood 90+1' (pen.)	Report		Stadium: National Stadium; Referee: Francia María González Martínez (Mexico)

18 April 2026 CONCACAF W Championship Q	Jamaica	2–0	Guyana	Kingston, Jamaica
	Shaw 8'; Hayles 88'	Report (FIFA); Report (CONCACAF)	2–0	Stadium: National Stadium; Referee: Vimarest Diaz (Dominican Republic)

9 October Friendly	Mexico	3–4	Jamaica	Aguascalientes, Mexico
19:00 UTC−6	Ovalle 29'; Bernal 45'; Corral 90+5'	Report	Brown 15'; Shaw 20'; Blackwood 36' (pen.); Washington 90'	Stadium: Estadio Victoria; Referee: Sandra Benítez (El Salvador)

13 October Friendly	Mexico	3–1	Jamaica	Querétaro, Mexico
19:00 UTC−6	Spencer 6' (o.g.); Reyes 32'; Ovalle 58'	Report	Van Zanten 60'	Stadium: Estadio Corregidora; Referee: Janeishka Cabán (Puerto Rico)

27 November 2026 CONCACAF W Championship QF	Jamaica	v	Costa Rica	Mansfield, United States
16:00 UTC−6				Stadium: Texas Health Mansfield Stadium

- Jamaica Fixtures and Results – Soccerway.com

== Coaching staff ==
=== Current coaching staff ===
As of October 2024

Name	Nat	Position
Hubert Busby Jr.	(Jamaica)	Head coach
Sanford Carabin	(Canada)	Assistant coach
Xavier Gilbert	(Jamaica)	Assistant coach
Alyssa Whitehead	(United States)	Goalkeeping coach
Lori-Ann Miller	(Jamaica)	Doctor
Saundria Codling	(Jamaica)	Physiotherapist
Omar Folkes	(Jamaica)	Equipment manager

=== Manager history ===
Name	Nat	Position	Year
Grace Butterfield	(Jamaica)	Jamaica National Senior Women's Team Manager	1991
Jean Nelson	(Jamaica)	Jamaica National Women's Teams Manager	1994
Jacqueline Cummings	(Jamaica)	Jamaica National Women's Team Asst Manager	1994
Elaine Walker-Brown	(Jamaica)	Jamaica National Senior Women's Team Manager	2014
Jean Nelson	(Jamaica)	Jamaica National Women's Teams Manager	2009–2010

== Players ==
=== Current squad ===
The following players were called up for the international friendly matches against Mexico on 9 and 13 October 2026.

Caps and goals correct as of 13 October 2026, after the most recent qualification match.

No.	Pos.	Player	Date of birth (age)	Caps	Goals	Club
13	GK	Becky Spencer	22 February 1991 (age 35)	26	0	(The Football Association) Chelsea
23	GK	Liya Brooks	17 May 2005 (age 21)	5	0	(United States Soccer Federation) North Carolina Tar Heels
1	GK	Aliyah Morgan	22 September 2004 (age 22)	1	0	(United States Soccer Federation) Anderson Trojans
2	DF	Naya Cardoza	2 November 2004 (age 22)	10	1	(Canadian Soccer Association) Halifax Tides
3	DF	Tianna Harris	7 February 2000 (age 26)	5	1	(Portuguese Football Federation) Damaiense
4	DF	Chantelle Swaby	6 August 1998 (age 28)	52	0	(The Football Association) Leicester City
5	DF	Konya Plummer	2 August 1997 (age 29)	42	3	(Turkish Football Federation) Fenerbahçe
7	DF	Mimi Van Zanten	25 January 2005 (age 21)	8	0	(United States Soccer Federation) San Diego Wave
14	DF	Deneisha Blackwood	7 March 1997 (age 29)	50	12	(Mexican Football Federation) Toluca
17	DF	Allyson Swaby	3 October 1996 (age 30)	47	2	(The Football Association) Crystal Palace
19	DF	Kameron Simmonds	6 December 2003 (age 22)	13	1	(United States Soccer Federation) Utah Royals
6	MF	Jade Bailey	11 November 1995 (age 31)	11	0	(Swedish Football Association) Piteå
8	MF	Drew Spence	23 October 1992 (age 34)	29	4	(The Football Association) Tottenham Hotspur
10	MF	Jody Brown	16 April 2002 (age 24)	48	21	(French Football Federation) Marseille
20	MF	Atlanta Primus	21 April 1997 (age 29)	25	1	(The Football Association) Sunderland
21	MF	Olufolasade Adamolekun	21 February 2001 (age 25)	20	1	(Scottish Football Association) Heart of Midlothian
22	MF	Solai Washington	1 October 2005 (age 21)	11	1	(United States Soccer Federation) Orlando Pride
9	FW	Kayla McKenna	3 September 1996 (age 30)	24	5	(Swiss Football Association) Grasshopper
11	FW	Khadija Shaw	31 January 1997 (age 29)	49	67	(The Football Association) Manchester City
12	FW	Kiki Van Zanten	25 August 2001 (age 25)	17	4	(United States Soccer Federation) Houston Dash
15	FW	Natasha Thomas	19 December 1995 (age 30)	7	3	(Football Association of Wales) Wrexham
16	FW	Paige Bailey-Gayle	12 November 2001 (age 25)	14	0	(Swiss Football Association) Rapperswil-Jona
18	FW	Trudi Carter	8 November 1994 (age 32)	36	16	(Mexican Football Federation) Club León

=== Recent call-ups ===
The following players have also been called up to the squad within the past 12 months.

Pos.	Player	Date of birth (age)	Caps	Goals	Club	Latest call-up
GK	Sydney Schneider	31 August 1999 (age 27)	23	0	(United States) Tampa Bay Sun	v. Guyana, 18 April 2026
DF	Tiffany Cameron	16 October 1991 (age 35)	26	6	(Canada) Halifax Tides	v. Nicaragua, 2 March 2026
DF	Vyan Sampson	2 July 1996 (age 30)	26	1	(Japan) INAC Kobe Leonessa	v. Guyana, 18 April 2026
DF	Jaileah Cox-McPherson	27 August 2006 (age 20)	2	0	(United States) FIU Panthers	v. Dominica, 29 November 2025
DF	Mia Mitchell	14 March 2005 (age 21)	1	0	(United States) Maryland Terrapins	v. Dominica, 29 November 2025
DF	Gabrielle Gayle	14 October 2000 (age 26)			(United States) Lancaster Inferno	v. Trinidad and Tobago, 28 October 2025
MF	Peyton McNamara	22 February 2002 (age 24)	8	0	Unattached	v. Panama, 8 June 2026
MF	Nikayla Small	24 March 2003 (age 23)	0	0	(Canada) AFC Toronto	v. Panama, 8 June 2026
MF	Izzy Groves	7 June 1999 (age 27)	5	0	(Vietnam) Hồ Chí Minh City	v. Nicaragua, 2 March 2026
FW	Shania Hayles	22 December 1999 (age 26)	10	3	(England) Newcastle United	v. Panama, 8 June 2026
FW	Shaneil Buckley	20 May 2005 (age 21)	10	2	(United States) Florida State Seminoles	v. Panama, 8 June 2026
FW	Ricshya Walker	21 September 2003 (age 23)	8	1	(United States) Lancaster Inferno	v. Dominica, 29 November 2025
FW	Njeri Butts	2 April 2004 (age 22)	2	0	(United States) Florida Gators	v. Trinidad and Tobago, 28 October 2025
Notes: ^{INJ} = Withdrew due to injury; ^{PRE} = Preliminary squad; ^{RET} = Retired from the national team; ^{SUS} = Serving suspension

== Records ==
As of 13 October 2026

Players in bold are still active, at least at club level.

Most Caps
#	Player	Caps	Goals	Career
1	Chantelle Swaby	52	0	2018–
2	Deneisha Blackwood	50	12	2018–
3	Khadija Shaw	49	67	2015–
4	Jody Brown	48	21	2018–
5	Allyson Swaby	47	2	2018–
6	Konya Plummer	42	3	2015–
=7	Sashana Campbell	36	3	2014–
=7	Trudi Carter	36	16	2014–
=9	Chinyelu Asher	29	6	2015–
=9	Drew Spence	29	4	2018–

Top Goalscorers
#	Player	Goals	Caps	Career
1	**Khadija Shaw**	67	49	2015–
2	**Shakira Duncan**	23	12+	2006–
=3	Venicia Reid	21	12+	2003–2015
=3	**Jody Brown**	21	48	2018–
5	**Trudi Carter**	16	36	2014–
6	**Deneisha Blackwood**	12	50	2018–
7	**Cheyna Matthews**	8	9	2019–
=8	**Tiffany Cameron**	6	26	2019–
=8	**Chinyelu Asher**	6	29	2015–
10	**Kayla McKenna**	5	24	2019–

== Competitive record ==
=== FIFA Women's World Cup ===
FIFA Women's World Cup record
Year	Result	GP	W	D*	L	GF	GA	GD	Squad
(China) 1991	Did not qualify								
(Sweden) 1995	Did not qualify								
(United States) 1999	Did not enter								
(United States) 2003	Did not qualify								
(China) 2007	Did not qualify								
(Germany) 2011	Did not enter								
(Canada) 2015	Did not qualify								
(France) 2019	Group stage	3	0	0	3	1	12	−11	Squad
(Australia) (New Zealand) 2023	Round of 16	4	1	2	1	1	1	0	Squad
(Brazil) 2027	To be determined								
(Costa Rica) (Jamaica) (Mexico) (United States) 2031	Qualified as co-host								
(United Kingdom) 2035	To be determined								
Total	Round of 16	7	1	2	4	2	13	−11	

*Draws include knockout matches decided on penalty kicks.

FIFA Women's World Cup history
Year	Round	Date	Opponent	Result	Stadium
(France) 2019	Group stage	9 June	Brazil	**L** 0–3	Stade des Alpes, Grenoble
(France) 2019	Group stage	14 June	Italy	**L** 0–5	Stade Auguste-Delaune, Reims
(France) 2019	Group stage	18 June	Australia	**L** 1–4	Stade des Alpes, Grenoble
(Australia) (New Zealand) 2023	Group stage	23 July	France	**D** 0–0	Sydney Football Stadium, Sydney
(Australia) (New Zealand) 2023	Group stage	29 July	Panama	**W** 1–0	Perth Rectangular Stadium, Perth
(Australia) (New Zealand) 2023	Group stage	2 August	Brazil	**D** 0–0	Melbourne Rectangular Stadium, Melbourne
(Australia) (New Zealand) 2023	Round of 16	8 August	Colombia	**L** 0–1	Melbourne Rectangular Stadium, Melbourne

=== Olympic Games ===
Summer Olympics record									Qualifying record					
Year	Result	Position	Pld	W	D*	L	GF	GA	Pld	W	D*	L	GF	GA
(United States) 1996	Did not qualify								1995 FIFA WWC					
(Australia) 2000	Did not enter								1999 FIFA WWC					
(Greece) 2004	Did not qualify								5	2	0	3	4	10
(China) 2008	Did not qualify								7	5	0	2	28	14
(United Kingdom) 2012	Did not enter								Did not enter					
(Brazil) 2016	Did not qualify								4	2	0	2	20	4
(Japan) 2020	Did not qualify								7	5	0	2	44	11
(France) 2024	Did not qualify								2	0	0	2	1	4
Total	-	-	-	-	-	-	-	-	25	14	0	11	97	43

*Draws include knockout matches decided on penalty kicks.

=== CONCACAF W Championship ===
CONCACAF W Championship record										Qualification record						
Year	Result	GP	W	D*	L	GF	GA	GD	Squad	GP	W	D*	L	GF	GA	GD
(Haiti) 1991	Group stage	3	0	0	3	1	12	−11	Squad	Qualified automatically						
(United States) 1993	Did not enter									Did not enter						
(Canada) 1994	Fifth place	4	0	0	4	2	22	−20	Squad	Qualified automatically						
(Canada) 1998	Did not enter									Did not enter						
(United States) 2000	Did not enter									Did not enter						
(Canada) (United States) 2002	Group stage	3	0	0	3	1	13	−12	Squad	4	3	1	0	13	0	+13
(United States) 2006	**Fourth place**	**3**	**1**	**0**	**2**	**2**	**7**	**−5**	**Squad**	5	5	0	0	37	0	+37
(Mexico) 2010	Did not enter									Did not enter						
(United States) 2014	Group stage	3	1	0	2	8	5	+3	Squad	2014 Caribbean Cup						
(United States) 2018	**Third place**	**5**	**2**	**1**	**2**	**12**	**10**	**+2**	**Squad**	7	6	1	0	41	4	+37
(Mexico) 2022	**Third place**	**5**	**3**	**0**	**2**	**6**	**8**	**−2**	**Squad**	4	4	0	0	24	2	+22
(United States) 2026	Qualified									4	4	0	0	27	2	+25
Total	Third place	26	7	1	18	32	77	−45		24	22	2	0	142	8	+134

*Draws include knockout matches decided on penalty kicks.

=== CONCACAF W Gold Cup ===
CONCACAF W Gold Cup record								Qualification record							
Year	Result	GP	W	D*	L	GF	GA	Division	Group	GP	W	D*	L	GF	GA
(United States) 2024	Did not qualify							A	B	4	0	3	1	5	6
(N/A) 2029	To be determined							To be determined							
Total	–	–	–	–	–	–	–	–	–	4	0	3	1	5	6

*Draws include knockout matches decided on penalty kicks.

=== Pan American Games ===
Pan American Games record
Year	Result	Pld	W	D*	L	GF	GA	Squad
(Canada) 1999	Did not enter							
(Dominican Republic) 2003	Did not enter							
(Brazil) 2007	Preliminary round	4	1	1	2	3	17	Squad
(Mexico) 2011	Did not enter							
(Canada) 2015	Did not qualify							
(Peru) 2019	Seventh place	4	1	0	3	2	7	Squad
(Chile) 2023	Eighth place	4	0	0	3	0	23	Squad
Total	Seventh place	12	2	1	8	5	47	

*Draws include knockout matches decided on penalty kicks.

=== Central American and Caribbean Games ===
Central American and Caribbean Games record
Year	Result	Pld	W	D*	L	GF	GA
(Puerto Rico) 2010	Did not enter						
(Mexico) 2014	Did not enter						
(Colombia) 2018	Group stage	3	1	0	2	4	5
(El Salvador) 2023	Group stage	3	0	1	2	6	13
Total	Group stage	6	1	1	4	10	18

*Draws include knockout matches decided on penalty kicks.

=== CFU Women's Caribbean Cup ===
CFU Women's Caribbean Cup record
Year	Result	Pld	W	D*	L	GF	GA
(Haiti) 2000	Group stage	4	3	0	1	16	2
(Trinidad and Tobago) 2014	**Runners-up**	**6**	**5**	**0**	**1**	**36**	**3**
(Jamaica) 2018	N/A	2	1	0	1	3	3
Total	Runners-up	12	9	0	3	55	8

*Draws include knockout matches decided on penalty kicks.

=== Other tournaments ===
Year	Result	Pld	W	D	L	GF	GA
(Australia) 2023 Cup of Nations	Fourth place	3	0	0	3	2	9

== Honours ==
=== Major competitions ===
- **CONCACAF W Championship**

Third place (2): 2018, 2022

=== Regional ===
- **CFU Women's Caribbean Cup**

Runners-up (1): 2014

== See also ==
- Sport in Jamaica
  - Football in Jamaica
    - Women's football in Jamaica
- Jamaica men's national football team
