= Laura Jackson =

Laura Jackson may refer to:

- Laura Jackson (cricketer), English cricketer
- Laura Jackson (footballer) (born 1991), English-born Jamaican footballer and coach
- Laura Riding Jackson or Laura Riding (1901–1991), American writer
- Laura Jackson (presenter) (born 1986), British television presenter of UK game show Take Me Out: The Gossip
- Laura Jackson (conductor), American conductor and violinist

== See also ==
- Lara Jackson (born 1986), American swimmer
- Lauren Jackson (born 1981), Australian basketball player
