= Horses in Jamaica =

Equines in Jamaica at the time of the Spanish conquest

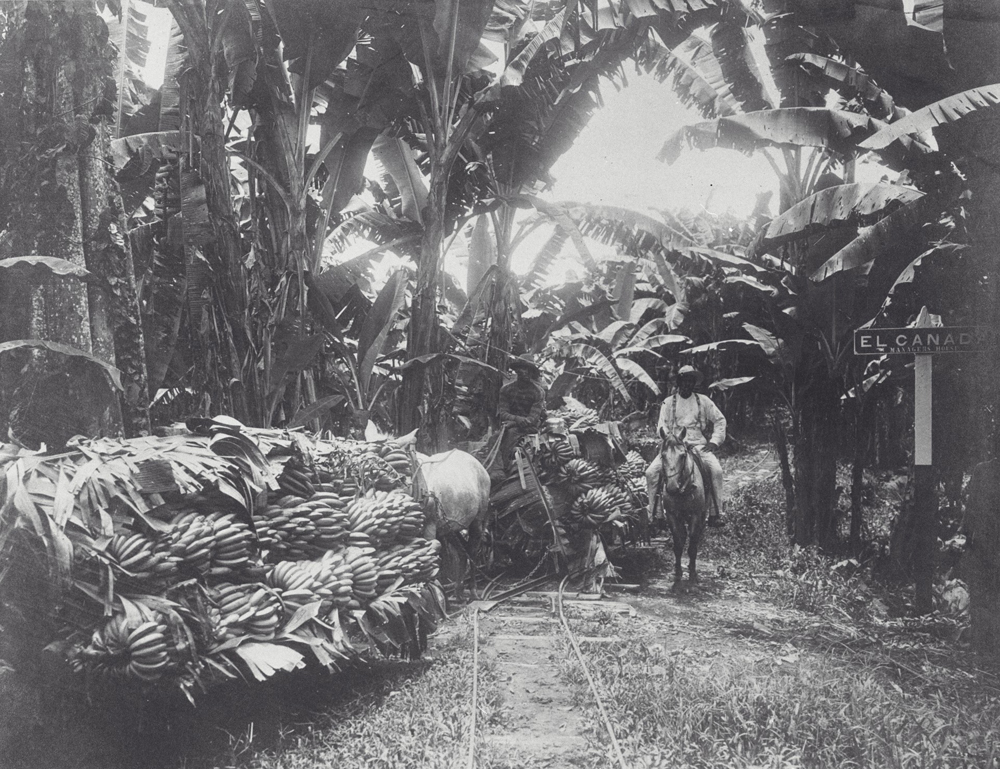
Jamaican rider and horse-drawn traction horse at work in a banana plantation, between 1880 and 1920

Horses were introduced to Jamaica by Spanish conquistadors (conquerors) and colonists in 1509. After a good initial development, horse breeding was curbed as the Jamaican grasslands were used for plantations. The English conquest of the island in 1670 led to the massacre of Spanish horses, their gradual replacement by English horses, and the arrival of West African slaves, themselves assimilated to animals by Anglo-American slave owners. Horse breeding enjoyed a revival in the 18th century.

Although Jamaica was still mentioned as a breeding ground in the 19th century, horses have become much rarer in modern times due to modernised transport, with around 4,000 head recorded in 2017. Horse racing developed throughout the 19th century, to the point where the island became the leading horse racing centre in the Caribbean in the mid-twentieth century, before declining due to capital flight. Polo is also played in Jamaica.

== History ==
The domesticated horse (Equus caballus) is not native to Jamaica. Fossils of wild horses dating back to prehistoric times have been found all over the Americas, but the horse became extinct around 10,000 BC, perhaps as a result of hunting pressure from human populations. The domesticated species were gradually introduced to the American continent by European explorers and colonists from the 15th century onwards.

=== First arrivals ===
In 1509, Diego Columbus arranged the colonisation of the island of Jamaica, so Juan de Esquivel took horses and cattle with him. These first horses and colonists arrived in Sevilla la Nueva. As in the neighbouring islands previously colonised by the Spanish, livestock farming became well established and, as a result, horses multiplied.

The Monarchy of Spain lost some interest in Jamaica as it became clear that the island held no gold; nevertheless, it remains valuable as a base for preparing expeditions and conquests, and for its abundance of horses. Herrera's report states that the island will soon provide "large supplies of horses" for the new colonies, as well as pigs and cotton. The various unsuccessful expeditions sent by Francisco de Garay to Central America during the 1520s always included lancers mounted on horses born in Jamaica. The capitulations signed by Joanna the Mad in favor of Francisco Pizarro's invasion of Peru in 1529 mention the dispatch of 25 mares and the same number of stallions from the island. Three months after the creation of the Veracruz colony (now Mexico), Hernán Cortés received a seal brown Jamaican stallion named "El Romo" ("The Roman") from a ship sailing from Cuba and led by one of his friends. A week later, another, less friendly ship was captured by Cortés' troops, who appropriated its cargo of a dozen Jamaican horses, including the black stallion he would ride all the way to Honduras, Morcillo (or "El Morzillo" according to other sources).

Before the English conquest Jamaica was known primarily for its cattle and horses, with no mention of slavery. However, it seems that horse breeding began to decline around this time. This may have been due to the island's topography, with lowland areas being fenced off to be turned into plantations. In any case, large herds of semi-wild horses (cimarrones) never developed in Jamaica, unlike on the neighbouring islands of Hispaniola and Puerto Rico.

=== English conquest and colonisation ===
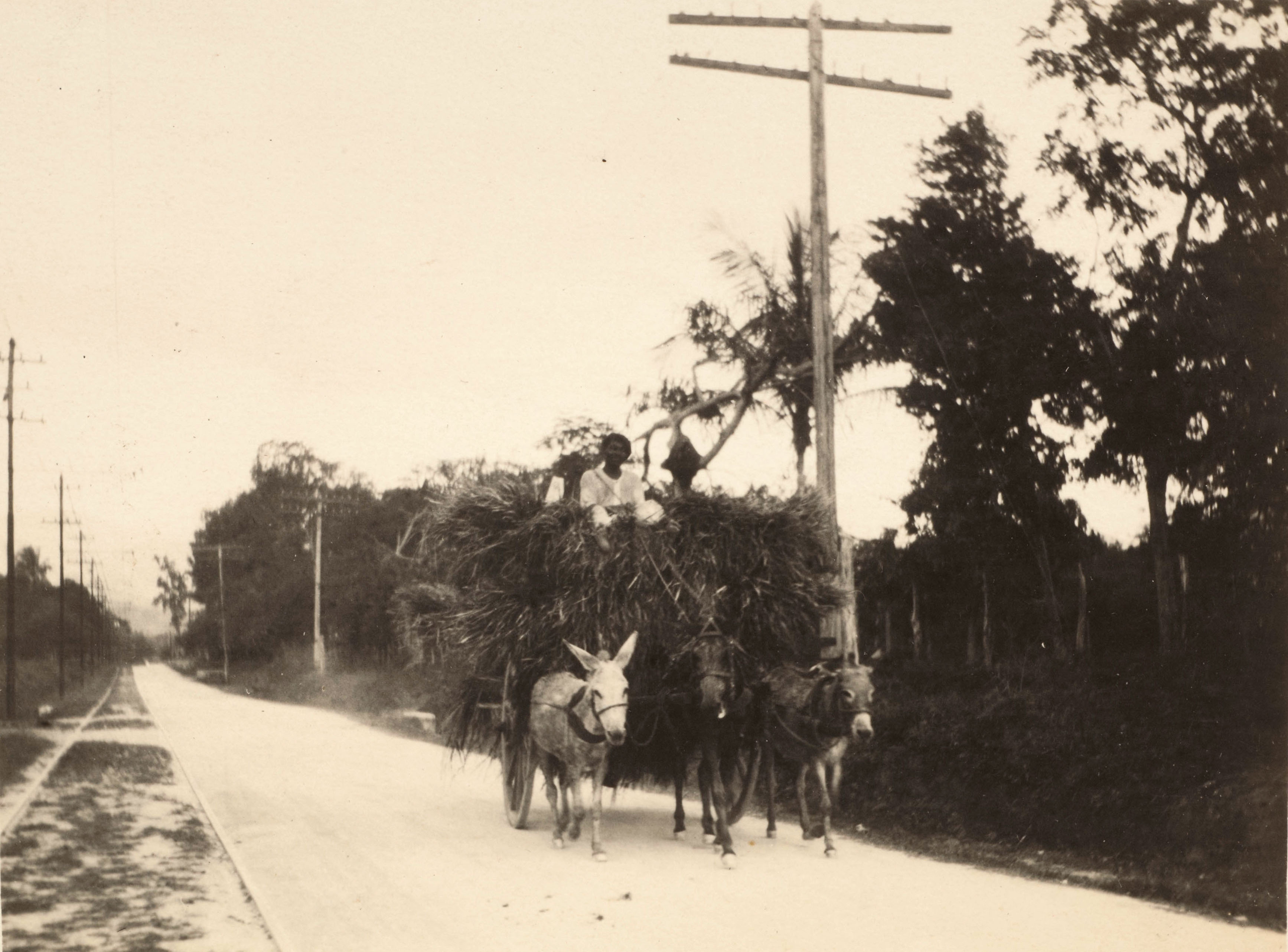
One horse and two donkeys harnessed together to transport fodder, Jamaica, 1912

During the English conquest of Jamaica in 1655, mention is made of the presence of horses and donkeys in the savannahs, which the new conquerors report having hunted down "like vermin". According to Deb Bennett, the English despised the horses bred by the Spanish, and later imported their own breeds to the island: Yorkshire Carrossiers for pulling carriages, Hobbies for saddling and Thoroughbreds a little later. In particular, these imports accompanied the development of sugarcane cultivation, which required horses for work and transport. According to zoologist Ángel Cabrera, this led to a new phase of prosperity for Jamaican breeding in the 18th century. But a new war broke out between England and Spain, and it was against this backdrop that Admiral Edward Vernon embarked Jamaican volunteer cavalrymen and their horses in January 1741.

Most Jamaican horses were bred in the parishes of the west of the island, in fields known locally as "pens". Horse riding was practiced by all white people living on the island. It was common for wealthy whites to visit each other, the men riding while the women rode in carriages pulled by four horses, themselves driven by postilions in luxurious clothes.

=== Horses and enslaved people in Jamaica ===
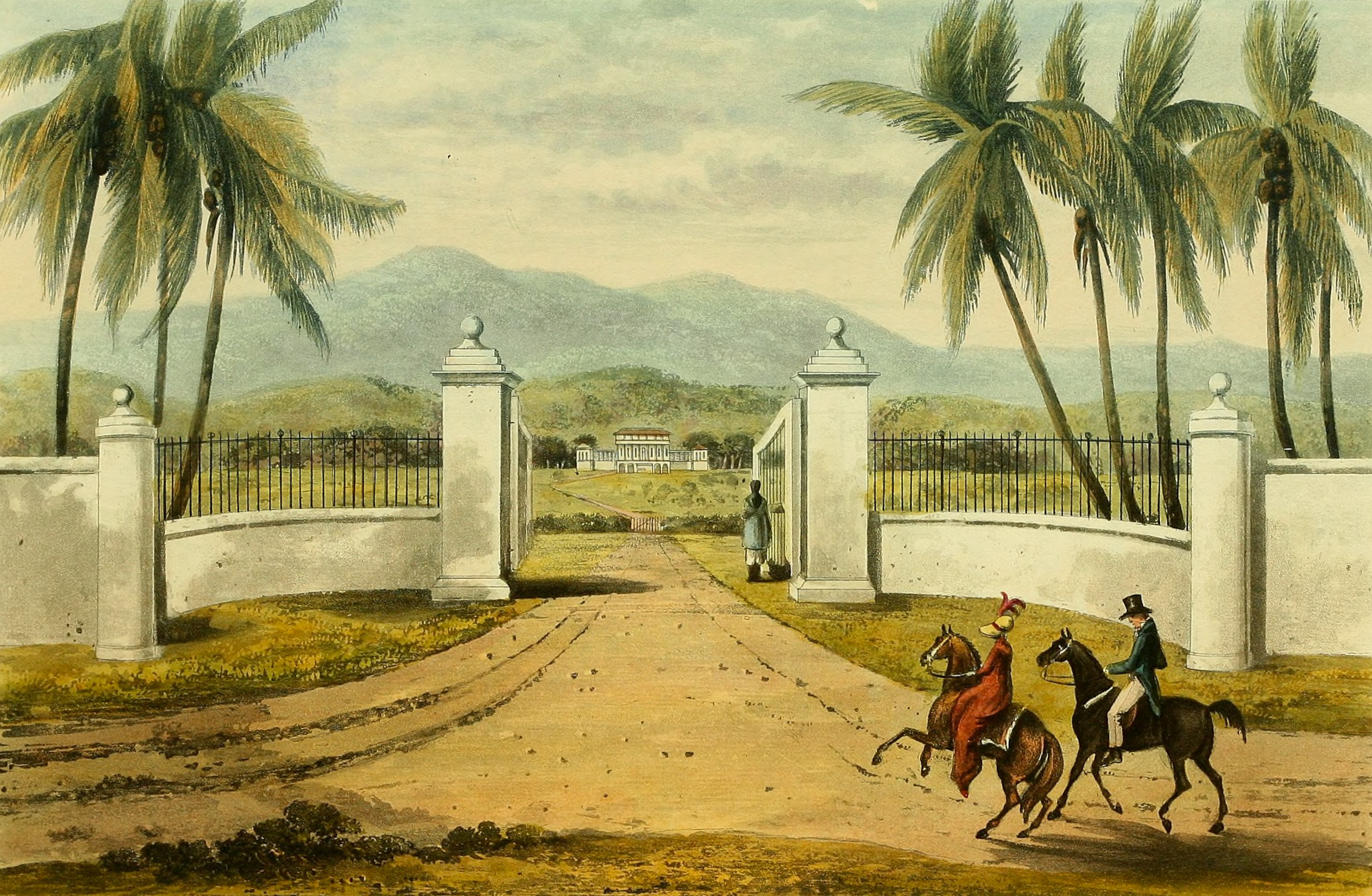
Engraving of two horsemen in front of the Rose Hall plantation house, by James Hakewill in "A picturesque tour of the island of Jamaica" (1825)

In the 18th century, around 13% of the slaves brought by the English to the island of Jamaica (mostly black Africans) worked with livestock. The local use of the horse as a draft animal probably came as a surprise to the newly arrived African slaves, as this use was unknown in sub-Saharan Africa at the time.

An example of such farms was provided by Philip D. Morgan's case study of Vineyard Pen, a farm with 251 head of cattle and 16 horses in 1750–1751. The horses on this farm probably came from England or North America. Enslaved people were described and treated as property, as were animals. Moreover, these slaves were, along with horses and cattle, the only ones to be given individual names, most likely by their owners. Certain names could be shared between slaves, cattle and horses, whether they be meliorative names (Beauty, Faithful Black...), pejorative names (Big Belly, Deceitful, False Heart...), or classic anglophone names, derived for example from the gods of Roman mythology. The only enslaved people who did not share the same type of name as the animals are those who exercised a function linked to a share of prestige, for example, the supervisors of breeding pens. It seems that a lighter skin color helped to gain access to these functions.

Enslaved people were also likened to animals through analogies and comparisons, based on domestication and docility. One of these, which author Philip D. Morgan recounts the comments of enslaver Hector McNeil, in 1788 comparing enslaved people to livestock:

A negro has more idea of the good of liberty, sir, than your horse. Both are equally willing to roam free without control; and unless they have plenty to eat and drink, they won't come near you. Take one or the other, however, and break him in properly; accustom him to the bridle and occasionally to the whip, show him the way, and soon he will not only endure, but love the task he has to perform ....

— Hector McNeil

Jamaican newspapers of the 18th century contained advertisements for enslaved people who liberated themselves, accompanied by dehumanizing caricatures; these appeared alongside those for stray or runaway horses and mules.

=== From the 1800s to the 1960s ===
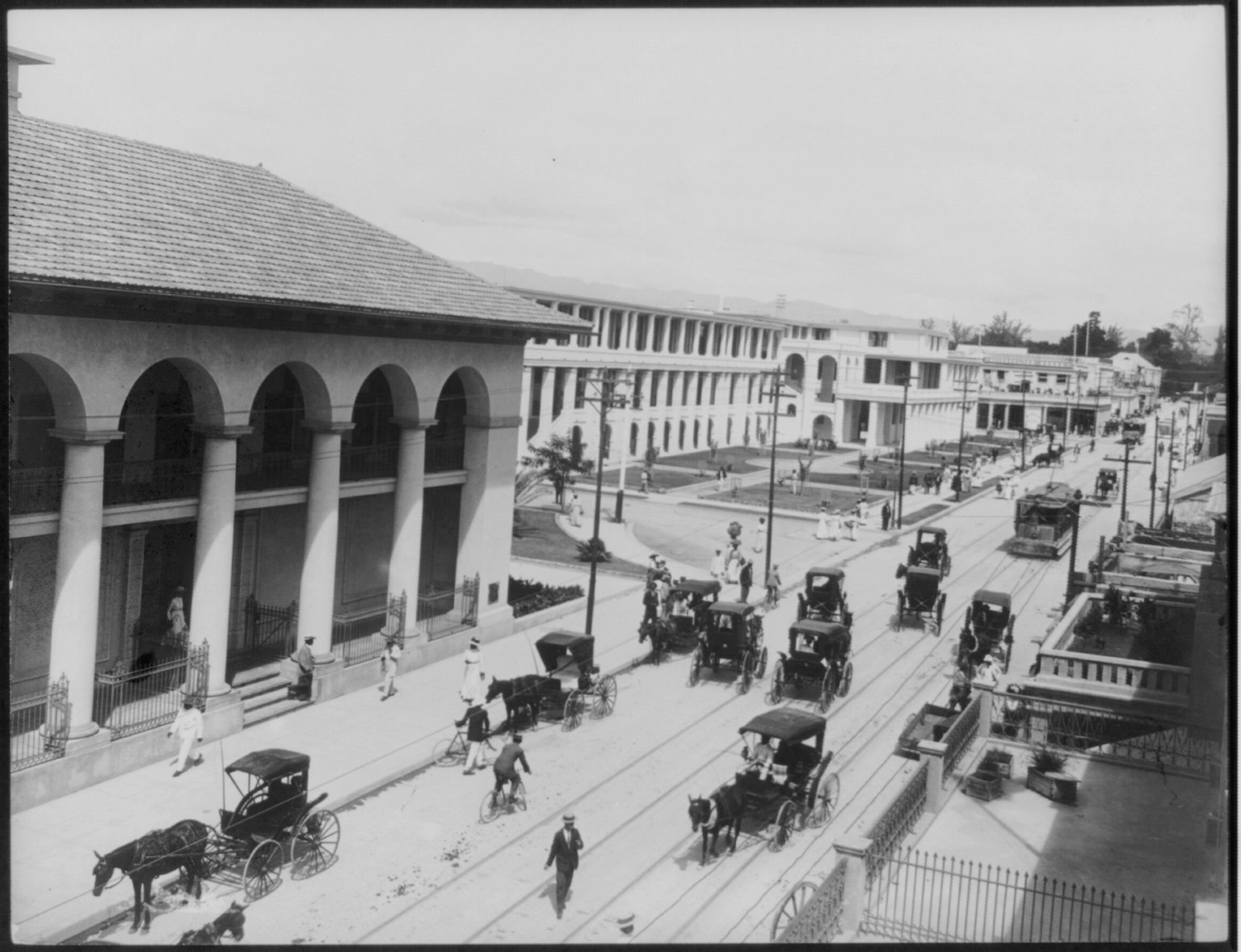
Horse-drawn vehicles in Kingston, 1900

Horse racing, a typically British sport involving Thoroughbreds (horses bred for racing), developed throughout the 19th century.

In 1857, retired English judge Edward Chitty contacted Colonial Secretary Henry Labouchere, then in search of military remounts, and presented himself as one of Jamaica's finest horse masters, arguing that Jamaican horses were among the best for remounting light cavalry. In 1887, the Royal United Service Institution debated whether Jamaica could be a supplier of horses to the British Army. During these discussions, the possibility of finding large horses in Jamaica and the good quality of local breeding were emphasised.

=== Since independence ===
Jamaican road sign.

The breeding and use of horses began to decline in the 1940s, with the modernisation of modes of transport.

In the 1960s, a disease affected horses in the east of the island. Professor Louis Grant of the University of the West Indies (Mona campus) established a quarantine on the movements of horses, donkeys and mules in the region. His laboratory research revealed that the horses were suffering from equine encephalitis. He recommended lockdown measures to prevent the virus from ruining the Jamaican horse industry.

In the 1960s and 1970s, a general impoverishment of the Jamaican people, coupled with capital flight, led to a decline in Thoroughbred racehorse breeding. However, the industry was restructured between 1980 and 1990.

== Usage ==
Horse breeding and usage have lost their importance. The mule is preferred for rural work.

The consumption of horsemeat has occurred sporadically throughout Jamaican history, but is rare and particularly associated with wartime contexts.

=== Horse racing ===
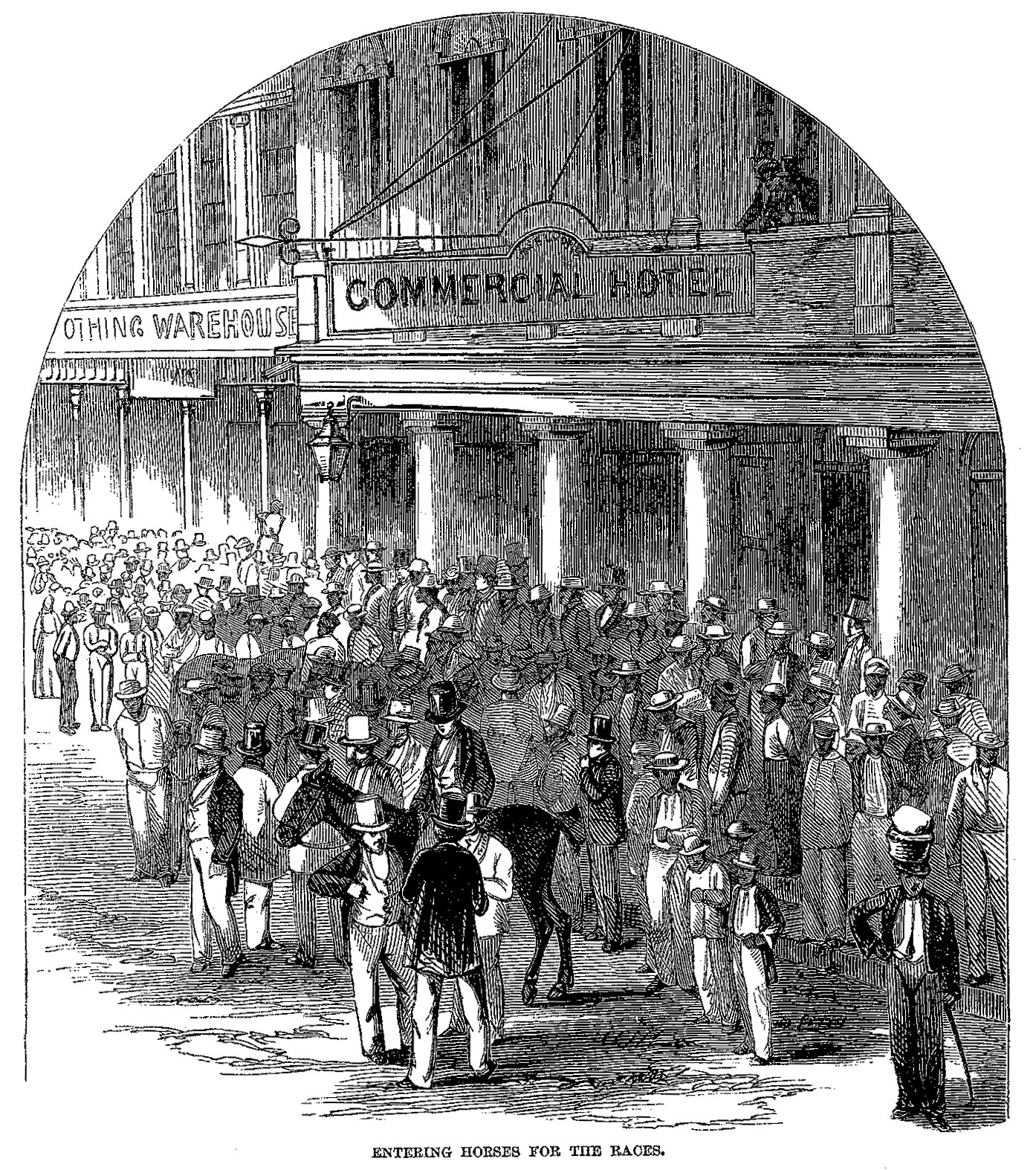
Preparing for a horse race in Jamaica in the 19th century

The organisation of horse races was first mentioned in 1808 by John Stewart. The first races were matches run on the savannah for two days in March each year, and the first racecourse was built in Kingston in 1816. In the same year, a one-mile race was organised. Other racecourses were built at Saint Ann (Black Heath Pen), Falmouth and Mandeville. In 1816, 24 races were run on the island. Prizes were distributed by the British Crown to encourage the breeding of hardy horses. The Jamaica Jockey Club changed its name to Knutsford Park Ltd. in 1926. The popularity of racing continued into the 20th century, making Jamaica a transport hub for horse racing in the Caribbean. In 1959, a portion of Caymanas, a former sugar plantation west of Kingston, was purchased to become the country's main racecourse, a status it retains to this day. Horse racing is still practiced, with an experiment in predicting results using algorithms leading to a publication in 2008. One of the major issues is the fight against horse doping.

Caymanas Park in Portmore, is the last remaining commercial racetrack on the island. However, local horse racing in rural communities is still a popular pastime.

=== Polo ===
The two remaining outlets for the local horse breed are riding and polo. The English, in particular the Redcoat officers, introduced polo to Jamaica. Polo is still taught and practiced on the island.

== Breeding ==
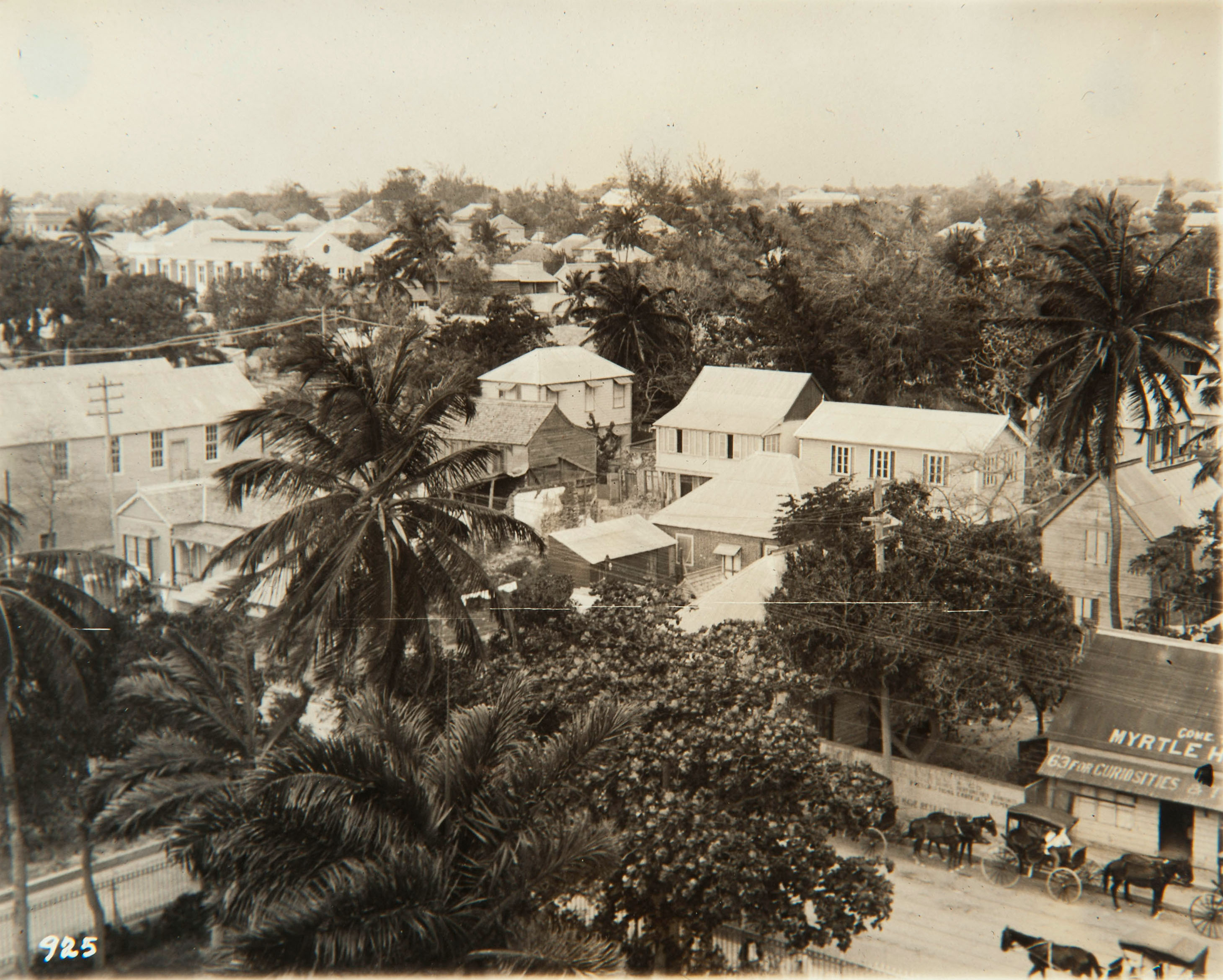
A Jamaican street in 1914, with horse-drawn vehicles

In Equine Science 2017, the Jamaican horse population was estimated at 4,000 head, representing 0.01% of the world horse population.

=== Bred breeds ===
The DAD-IS database does not indicate the presence of any particular breed of horse in Jamaica.

However, various authors, notably in the 19th century, have described a breed of horse unique to Jamaica. Polo player Thomas Francis Dale described it as "a racehorse in miniature", with a distinguished head and expressive intelligence. He adds that the foal's faults fade if they are well cared for. These faults include an overly long body, flat ribs and "cow knees". Colonel Charles Hamilton Smith describes these local horses as lighter and smaller than English Thoroughbreds, but noble, elegant and fast. For Cabrera, this rather small horse is the result of cross-breeding between the surviving Spanish stock and the animals brought over by the English. According to Deb Bennett, these Jamaican horses influenced North American horses, resulting, after numerous crosses, in the "North American hill horse". The Jamaican horse was probably also exported to the Bahamas.

The Thoroughbred is bred for racing, with a specifically established Jamaican studbook. The 1951 Racing Year maintains that the best Thoroughbreds in the Caribbean are bred in Jamaica, with exports to Trinidad and Panama.

=== Diseases and parasitism ===
Like many other countries, Jamaica is home to tick species that are parasites of horses. There are also various species of parasitic strongyles. During the 1960s, Professor Grant conducted research into three Jamaican diseases, two of which are likely to affect horses: leptospirosis and equine encephalitis. He discovered the role of rat urine as a propagator of leptospirosis.

There was evidence of West Nile virus circulation in 2003.

== Culture ==
The horse is present among the practices of African spiritual practices in Jamaica, for example myal and obeah, described by Zora Neale Hurston in her 1938 book Tell My Horse. A particular emphasis on the tails of horses and cattle seems to have its roots in similar traditions in West Africa. These tails are used as practical and decorative objects, and are also believed to have magical virtues.

Among other beliefs cited as specific to Afro-Jamaicans, one holds that to prevent a horse from winning a race, one must collect the dirt stuck from its hoof and wrap it with asafoetida in a garment bound to the plant; placing the whole under a very heavy object guarantees that the horse will lose its next race. This charm will not work, however, if the horse's owner gets the dirt stuck to his hooves first, especially if he throws the dirt elsewhere on race day itself.

The horseshoe is supposed to keep misfortune at bay. Finally, again according to Jamaican black beliefs, half-closing a pocket knife will make horses stop.

== See also ==
- Caymanas Park
- History of Jamaica
- Invasion of Jamaica

== Bibliography ==
- Bennett, Deb (1998). Conquerors : The Roots of New World Horsemanship. Amigo Publicaciones, Inc. p. 448. ISBN 978-0-9658533-0-9.
- Cabrera, Ángel (2004). Chevaux d'Amérique (in French). Translated by Bellec, Christine. Éditions du Rocher. ISBN 2-268-05129-3.
- Denhardt, Robert (1975). The horse of the Americas. University of Oklahoma Press. ISBN 0-8061-1213-1. OCLC 922660.
- Hamilton, Howard (2020). My Journey with Thoroughbreds. Partridge Publishing Singapore. ISBN 978-1-5437-5693-7.
- Morgan, Philip (1995). "Slaves and Livestock in Eighteenth-Century Jamaica: Vineyard Pen, 1750-1751". The William and Mary Quarterly. 52 (1): 47–76. doi:10.2307/2946887. ISSN 0043-5597. JSTOR 2946887.
