= Caymanas Park =

Horse race track and park in Jamaica

- Interactive map of Caymanas Park
- Location: Gregory Park, St Catherine, Jamaica
- Coordinates: 17.989652°N 76.875050°W
- Owned by: Government of Jamaica
- Race type: Flat
- Course type: Oval with extended straights at NW and SE corners
- Notable races: Mouttet Mile

Caymanas Park is Jamaica's only race track.

It was historically a sugarcane estate in the Colony of Jamaica. It was originally owned by the Ellis family, including George Ellis and Charles Ellis, 1st Baron Seaford, who made substantial profits from sugar and slavery.

It features in the Pioneers' 1969 song "Long Shot (Kick The Bucket)", which relates the demise of the racehorse 'Long Shot' in a race, leading to "a weeping and a wailing down at Caymanas Park", and "All we money gone a hell".

Gangster Dennis Barth, known as "Copper", was killed in a shootout with police at the park.

Caymanas Park hosts the Mouttet Mile, the richest race in the English-speaking Caribbean.

== See also ==
- Sport in Jamaica
- Horses in Jamaica
