= Dennis Barth =

Jamaican criminal (1951–1978)

Dennis "Copper" Barth
- Born: 1951
- Died: 1978 (aged 26–27); Caymanas Park
- Occupation: Gangster

Dennis "Copper" Barth (1951– May 1978) was a gangster in Jamaica, who operated out of the Rennock Lodge area in east Kingston. Barth is mentioned in the lyrics of Super Cat's dancehall reggae song "Ghetto Red Hot": "Kingston we deh when Massop get shot / We deh when Copper get shot”, referring to Claude “Claudie" Massop and Barth, who made gang peace treaty in the 1970s.

== Death ==
Barth was convicted of killing two policemen and escaped from jails twice. Copper was killed in a shootout with police at the Caymanas Park race track in 1978.
