= Mouttet Mile =

Grade 1 horse race in Jamaica

- Class: Grade 1
- Location: Caymanas Park
- Inaugurated: December 3, 2022
- Race type: Thoroughbred - Flat race

Race information
- Distance: 1600m
- Surface: Dirt
- Qualification: 3-y-o+
- Weight: 126 lbs (basic weight); Allowances; 5 lbs for fillies and mares 2 lbs for Native Bred 3yos
- Purse: $300,000 USD (2025)

The Mouttet Mile is a Grade 1 horse race in Jamaica for Thoroughbreds aged three and above. Held in early December at Caymanas Park over 1600m, it is the richest horse race in the English-speaking Caribbean with a purse of $300,000 USD. The race was first ran on the 3rd of December, 2022 with a purse of $125,000 ($18.7 million JMD).

For the 2025 edition of the Mouttet Mile, the race will be broadcast on FOX Sports in partnership with the New York Racing Association in order to expand the range and prestige of the race.

== Weight ==
126 lb for basic weight

Allowances:

- 5 lb for fillies and mares
- 2 lb for native bred 3-y-o

The basic weight will be applied if all participating horses are domiciled in Jamaica, Barbados, and Trinidad & Tobago before January 1. If there are one or more horses entered that are not domiciled in Jamaica, Barbados, and Trinidad & Tobago before January 1, 2025, the following will apply:

- The basic weight will be applied to horse/s not domiciled in the aforementioned countries before January 1. No other allowances are applicable.
- A 5 lb allowance will be applied to the basic weight and any other applicable allowance to horses domiciled in the above countries.
- Horses that have won two or more 3-Y-O and above Grade I races since January 1 carry the basic weight.
- Horses that have won one 3-Y-O and above Grade I race since January 1 are allowed 2 lb.
- Horses that have won 2 or more Open Allowance races or two or more 3-Y-O only Grade I races since January 1 are allowed 4 lb
- Horses that have won any other race since January 1 are allowed 8 lb.
- Horses that have not won a race at 7 furlongs or over since January 1 are allowed 2 lb.
- Horses that have not won a race since August 2 are allowed 3 lb

If at the close of entries, there are no horse/s entered whose weight is 126 lb, then the highest weighted horse/s will be adjusted upward to 126lb, and all other horse/s will be adjusted upward accordingly.

== Winners since inauguration ==
Year	Winner	Age	Jockey	Trainer	Owner	Time
2022	Excessive Force	5	Bebeto Harvey	Philip Feanny	A.C.K. Stables	1:41.0
2023	Rough Entry	6	Julien Leparoux	Rohan Crichton	Dennis G. Smith, Daniel L. Walters	1:38.0
2024	Funcaandun	4	Robert Halledeen	Jason DaCosta	Carlton Watson	1:38.4
2025	Rideallday	3	Javier Castellano	Philip Feanny	Cassiopeia Racing INC	1.36.4
