= Rennock Lodge =

- Community
- Location within Jamaica
- Coordinates: 17°58′22.8″N 76°45′44.03″W
- Country: Jamaica
- City: Kingston
- Time zone: UTC-5 (EST)

Rennock Lodge is a neighbourhood in Kingston, Jamaica. J.E. Duerden reported finding pre-Columbian art in the area in 1879 in the form of two stone sculpted "images" described as amulets.

== Notable people ==
- Outlaw Dennis Barth attended Rennock Lodge Elementary School and operated his gang from the area
- Oswald Williams, "Count Ossie", had a Rastafarian commune in the area.
