= Equine encephalitis =

Equine encephalitis is a family of horse diseases that also affect humans. Encephalitis is an inflammation of the brain. Several forms of viral encephalitis can infect equines, and these include:

- Eastern equine encephalitis virus
- Japanese encephalitis virus
- Venezuelan equine encephalitis virus
- Western equine encephalitis virus
- West Nile virus
