= Laura Jackson (footballer) =

Jamaican football player (born 1991)

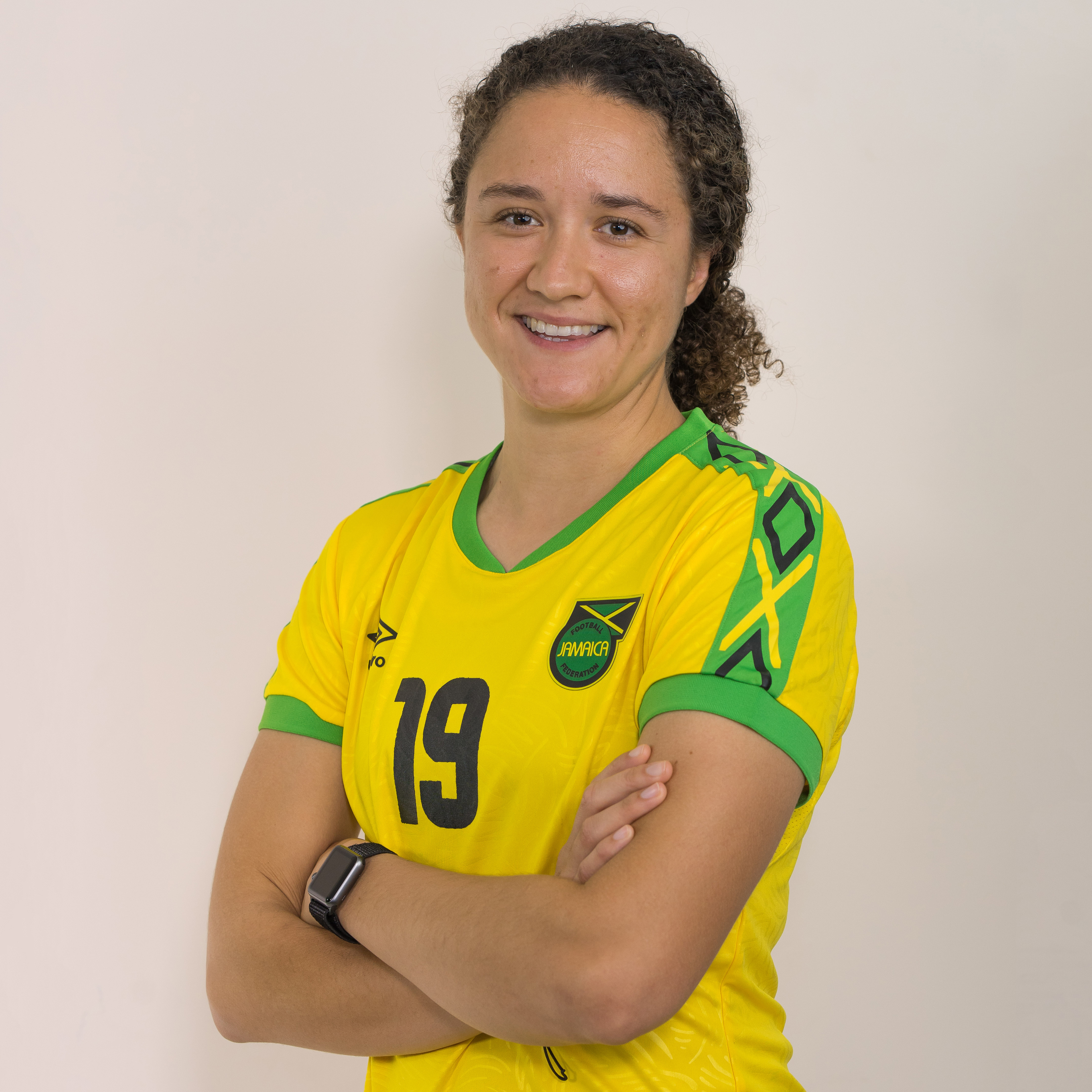

Personal information
- Full name: Laura Elaine Jackson
- Date of birth: January 17, 1991 (age 35)
- Place of birth: London, England
- Height: 1.80 m (5 ft 11 in)
- Positions: Central midfielder; centre-back

Youth career
- 2004–2005: Arsenal
- 2005–2007: Leyton Orient

College career
Years	Team	Apps	(Gls)
2009–2011	Syracuse Orange	19+	(0+)
2011–2013	Iona Gaels	34	(4)

Senior career*
Years	Team	Apps	(Gls)
2007–2009	Watford		

International career^{‡}
2019–2020	Jamaica	3	(0)

Managerial career
- 2017-2019: FAU Owls (assistant)
- 2019-2022: Kansas Jayhawks (assistant)
- * Club domestic league appearances and goals ‡ National team caps and goals as of 26 June 2020

Laura Elaine Jackson (born January 17, 1991) is a former professional footballer and coach. Born in England, she played as a midfielder for the Jamaica women's national team.

== Club career ==
Jackson is a product of Arsenal WFC and Leyton Orient FC. She made her debut for Watford FC in 2007.

== College career ==
Jackson attended Syracuse University and Iona College, both in the United States.

== International career ==
Jackson made her debut in a 1–0 friendly win against Chile on 28 February 2019.
