= Sport in Jamaica =

Athletics became the number one sport in Jamaica. The most popular sports in Jamaica are mostly imported from Britain. The most popular sports are athletics, cricket and association football; other popular sports include basketball, tennis and netball (usually for women). Out of all the top five sports, mixed martial arts, rugby league and rugby union are also considered growing sports in Jamaica.

== Athletics ==
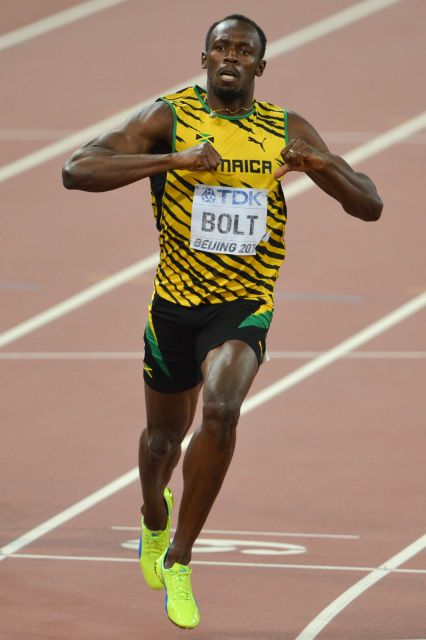
Usain Bolt is one of the most prominent runners in the world.

In Jamaica involvement in athletics begins at a very young age and most high schools maintain rigorous athletics programs with their top athletes competing in national competitions (most notably the VMBS Girls and Boys Athletics Championships) and international meets (most notably the Penn Relays). In Jamaica it is not uncommon for young athletes to attain press coverage and national fame long before they arrive on the international athletics stage.

Jamaica is one of the leading countries in sprinting with the current world record holder for 100m and 200m, Usain Bolt and the former 100m world record holder, Asafa Powell, both originating from the island, as does Yohan Blake, silver medalist at the 2012 London Olympics in the 100m and 200m. Also, a team of four Jamaicans, Bolt included (Powell being absent in Daegu 2011 due to injury), won the gold and broke the World Record in the 2008 Beijing Olympics and the 2011 IAAF World Athletics Championships, their new personal best is 37.04, from 37.10 in 2008. They broke the record for a third time at the 2012 London Olympics in a time of 36.84, is the only country to run sub-37 seconds. In addition, the country has a very strong high school athletics program throughout the schools which sees top high schools compete each year in the Inter-Secondary Schools Boys' and Girls' Championships. The 2010 winners of the event were Wolmer's Boys' School and Holmwood Technical High School (girls). The ability of Jamaicans to dominate the sprint is only further enhanced and highlighted by the supremacy of Usain Bolt, who earned his Olympic 'Triple-Double' (retaining his 100m and 200m titles from the 2008 Beijing Olympics at the 2012 London Olympics and 2016 Rio de Janeiro Olympics).

== Cricket ==
Cricket is one of the most popular sports in Jamaica. The Jamaica national cricket team has won ten Regional Four Day Competitions and seven WICB Cups. Jamaicans also play for the West Indies cricket team, which won the 1975 and 1979 Cricket World Cup, as well as the T20 International Cricket Council World Cup in 2012 and 2016. Jamaica has produced some of the world's most famous cricketers, including George Headley, Courtney Walsh, Chris Gayle and Michael Holding. Sabina Park is the only Test venue in the island, but the Greenfield Stadium is also used for cricket.

== Netball ==
Netball is a popular sport among Jamaican women, and is the country's most popular women's sport. The Jamaica national netball team, known as the Sunshine Girls, have participated in the Netball World Championships every year since their inception in 1963, finishing third in 1991, 2003 and 2007, and in the Commonwealth Games, earning the bronze medal in 2002, 2014 and 2018, followed by a silver in 2022 and 2026.

== Tennis ==
Tennis is a popular sports among Jamaicans with traditional Jamaican high schools being actively involved in competitive tennis and outside of the National Junior's Circuit and the ITF Junior's Circuit is played by many at the professional and amateur level with numerous National and International Tournaments being held.

The Jamaica men's national tennis team represents Jamaica in Davis Cup tennis and have participated in the Davis Cup since 1988 (Jamaican Players previously competed under the West Indies Team).

== Association football ==
Association football is a very popular sport in Jamaica, and is played at the professional and amateur levels, as well as informally on the street. The Jamaica national football team has won the Caribbean Cup five times, in 1991, 1998, 2005, 2008 and 2010. In addition, Jamaica advanced to the 1998 FIFA World Cup, where they earned a 2–1 win against Japan, although failing to advance past the first round. The Jamaica National Premier League is the first division football league in the country. The top two teams from Jamaica qualify for the CFU Club Championship. A top three finish in the CFU Club Championship grants a spot in the CONCACAF Champions League.

== Basketball ==
The island's fastest growing sport has produced several world-class athletes, most notably Basketball Hall of Fame player Patrick Ewing.

== Lacrosse ==
For the first time, Jamaica will feature a national team at the 2022 Under-19 World Lacrosse Championships.

== Boxing ==
Jamaica has also produced several world class amateur and professional boxers including Trevor Berbick and Mike McCallum. First-generation Jamaican athletes have continued to make a significant impact on the sport internationally, especially in the United Kingdom where the list of top British boxers born in Jamaica or of Jamaican parents includes Lloyd Honeyghan, Nicholas Walters, O'Neil Bell, Simon Brown, Uriah Grant, Glen Johnson, Chris Eubank, Alicia Ashley, Keith Mullings, Audley Harrison, David Haye, Lennox Lewis and Frank Bruno, Donovan "Razor" Ruddock, Mike Tyson, and Floyd Mayweather Jr., whose maternal grandfather is Jamaican.

== Mixed martial arts ==
This sport has become very popular in Jamaica, due to the participation of fighters as Uriah Hall, Aljamain Sterling, Randy Brown & Leon Edwards in the UFC.

== Wrestling ==
The sport of wrestling has been practiced in Jamaica since 1976, with the first amateur wrestling competing at the 1978 Commonwealth Games and various Olympic cyles for Wrestling at the Summer Olympics, the first wrestling club was Ocho Rios Wrestling Club in 2020. The sport continued to grow during the 21st century and by 2024, had a few wrestlers medal at CAC Games and Pan Am Games. The Olympic and Beach styles of wrestling are administered by the Jamaica Wrestling Federation. Professional wrestling television viewership is also very popular in Jamaica.

== Rugby league ==
Rugby league has been played in Jamaica since 2006. The Jamaica national rugby league team is made up of players who play in Jamaica and from UK based professional and semi professional clubs (notably in the Super League and Championship). In November 2018 for the first time ever, the Jamaica rugby league team qualified for the Rugby League World Cup after defeating the USA (16-10) & Canada (38-8). Jamaica will play in the 2021 Rugby League World Cup in England.

== Rugby union ==
Rugby union in Jamaica is a minor but growing sport, with 2,090 registered players. The sport is governed by the Jamaica Rugby Union. The Jamaica national rugby union team is ranked 66th in the world by the IRB rankings.

== Volleyball ==
Volleyball was introduced to Jamaica in 1959. The Jamaica Volleyball Association (JaVA) is the national governing body for volleyball in Jamaica. The Jamaica men's national volleyball team and the Jamaica women's national volleyball team won bronze medals at the 2025 CAZOVA Senior Men and Women Volleyball Championships in Nassau Bahamas

== Stadiums in Jamaica ==
Stadium	Country	Capacity
Independence Park	Jamaica	35,000
Sabina Park	Jamaica	15,600

== See also ==
- Jamaica at the Olympics
- Jamaica at the Pan American Games
- Jamaica at the Commonwealth Games
- Jamaica bobsleigh team
